= 2011 Atlanta Braves season =

2011 Atlanta Braves
- League: National League
- Division: East
- Ballpark: Turner Field
- City: Atlanta, Georgia
- Record: 89–73 (.549)
- Divisional place: 2nd
- Owners: Liberty Media
- General managers: Frank Wren
- Managers: Fredi González
- Television: SportSouth; Fox Sports South; Peachtree TV (Chip Caray, Joe Simpson, Tom Glavine, Brian Jordan, Ron Gant)
- Radio: WCNN; WNNX; Atlanta Braves Radio Network (Jim Powell, Don Sutton, Mark Lemke)

The 2011 Atlanta Braves season was the Braves' 46th season in Atlanta, and the 141st overall. For the first time since the 1990 season, Bobby Cox did not manage the club, having retired following the 2010 season. He was succeeded by Fredi González, the former third-base coach for the Braves between 2003 and 2006. After entering the playoffs with their first franchise Wild Card berth in 2010, the Braves attempted to return to the postseason for a second consecutive season. Entering the final month of the regular season with a record of 80–55 and an 8 1/2-game lead in the Wild Card standings, the Braves went 9–18 in September to finish the season with a record of 89–73. This September collapse caused the team to fall one game behind the St. Louis Cardinals in the Wild Card race after the final scheduled game of the season, which consequently eliminated them from postseason contention. On July 12, 2016, ESPN named the 2011 Braves collapse as the 25th worst collapse in sports history.

== Offseason transactions ==
=== Offseason additions and subtractions ===
	Subtractions	Additions
**Players**	**OF** Melky Cabrera (signed with Royals); **RHR** Takashi Saito (signed with Brewers); **INF** Omar Infante (traded to Marlins); **RHR** Kyle Farnsworth (signed with Rays); **OF** Rick Ankiel (signed with Nationals); **LHR** Mike Dunn (traded to Marlins); **OF** Matt Diaz (signed with Pirates)	**2B** Dan Uggla (Acquired in trade from Marlins); **INF/OF** Joe Mather (Claimed of waivers from Cardinals); **RHR** Scott Linebrink (Acquired in a trade from White Sox); **LHR** George Sherrill (Signed as a free agent); **RHR** Anthony Varvaro (claimed off waivers from Mariners); **RHS** Rodrigo Lopez* (signed as a free agent)
**Personnel**	**Manager** Bobby Cox (retired); **Bench Coach** Chino Cadahia (not offered new contract); **First base Coach** Glenn Hubbard (not offered new contract)	**Manager** Fredi González; **Hitting coach** Larry Parrish; **Bench Coach** Carlos Tosca

*Player was a non-roster invitee to Spring training (not on 40-man roster)

=== Timeline ===
Names highlighted in bold appear in table above.

==== October 2010 ====
October 13: The Atlanta Braves announced that Fredi González would replace long-time Braves manager Bobby Cox as manager of the team in 2011. The announcement came just two days after the 2010 Atlanta Braves were eliminated from the postseason. It was also announced that pitching coach Roger McDowell, third-base coach Brian Snitker, and bullpen coach Eddie Pérez would retain their current positions, while former hitting coach Terry Pendleton would replace Glenn Hubbard as the first-base coach. There were two newcomers to the staff, Larry Parrish, as the hitting coach, and Carlos Tosca as the bench coach. Hubbard and former bench coach Chino Cadahia were not offered positions on the new coaching staff.

Position	2010	2011
Manager	Bobby Cox	Fredi González
Hitting	Terry Pendleton	Larry Parrish
Pitching	Roger McDowell	
First-base	Glenn Hubbard	Terry Pendleton
Third-base	Brian Snitker	
Bullpen	Eddie Pérez	
Bench	Chino Cadahia	Carlos Tosca

October 19: The Atlanta Braves released left-fielder Melky Cabrera, reliever Takashi Saito, and back-up catcher J. C. Boscán in order to make room on their 40-man roster for future transactions that would come in the offseason.

==== November 2010 ====
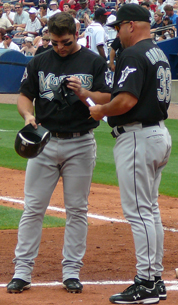
Dan Uggla (left) and Fredi González (right), both former Marlins, came to the Braves organization for 2011.

November 2: The Braves picked up the $2.5 million options for both shortstop Alex González and All-Star utility man Omar Infante. Additionally, the Braves resigned reliever Scott Proctor to a one-year deal worth $750,000 including incentives that bring the total to $1 million. Finally, the Braves declined reliever Kyle Farnsworth's $5.25 million option and center fielder Rick Ankiel's $6 million option for the 2011 season.

November 3: The Braves claimed utility man Joe Mather off waivers from the St. Louis Cardinals. He was later placed on outright waivers by the Braves on March 27 after underperforming in Spring training.

November 16: The Braves traded Omar Infante and Mike Dunn to the Florida Marlins for Dan Uggla. In January, Uggla's contract was extended to a five-year, $62 million deal.

==== December 2010 ====
December 2: The Braves decided to non-tender the contract of Matt Diaz, effectively ending his tenure as a Brave. On the same day, the Braves agreed to terms with infielder/outfielder Eric Hinske, allowing his return in 2011.

December 3: The Braves agreed to a two-player trade with the White Sox, sending minor league right-handed pitcher Kyle Cofield to Chicago in exchange for right-handed relief pitcher Scott Linebrink.

December 10: At the Winter Meetings, the Braves agreed to a one-year deal with left-handed relief pitcher George Sherrill for the 2011 season.

==== January 2011 ====
January 13: The Braves claimed right-handed reliever Anthony Varvaro off waivers from the Seattle Mariners in order to add bullpen depth to the organization.

January 18: In order to avoid arbitration, the Braves offered new one-year contracts to starting pitcher Jair Jurrjens ($3.25 million), second baseman Martín Prado ($3.1 million), and relief pitchers Peter Moylan ($2 million) and Eric O'Flaherty ($895,000). These were the last four Braves players to be eligible for arbitration.

January 31: The Braves signed right-handed pitcher Rodrigo López to a minor league contract, which included an invite to the major league Spring training camp.

==== February 2011 ====
February 21: The Braves announced that General Manager Frank Wren had been offered a two-year contract extension, taking him through the 2013 season with the Braves.

== Spring training ==
The 2011 Atlanta Braves played a 35-game slate that started on February 26, 2011, for the 2011 spring training season. Pitchers and catchers were to report by February 14 with the first full-squad workout occurring February 19. For the fourteenth straight season, Champion Stadium at the ESPN Wide World of Sports Complex in Lake Buena Vista served as the Florida home for the Atlanta Braves. The last two games, on March 29–30, were played at Turner Field against the Minnesota Twins.

2011 Atlanta Braves spring training schedule
Spring training standings

=== Luis Salazar injury ===
In the first inning of the March 9 game versus the St. Louis Cardinals, Brian McCann pulled a foul ball sharply toward the Braves' dugout, striking Minor League manager Luis Salazar in the left eye. After being knocked down four stairs and falling on his head, he was airlifted to the Orlando Regional Medical Center for further treatment. Following a strong recovery from multiple facial fractures, doctors determined that Salazar's left eye could not be saved and performed an operation to have it removed on March 16. Despite this, he still plans to perform his new job as manager of the Class A Advanced Lynchburg Hillcats. During the entire ordeal, Brian McCann expressed feelings of guilt for hitting the ball and was notably shaken by the incident.

== Regular season ==
=== Season standings ===
MLB Standings

==== National League East ====
NL East
Team	W	L	Pct.	GB	Home	Road
Philadelphia Phillies	102	60	.630	—	52‍–‍29	50‍–‍31
Atlanta Braves	89	73	.549	13	47‍–‍34	42‍–‍39
Washington Nationals	80	81	.497	21½	44‍–‍36	36‍–‍45
New York Mets	77	85	.475	25	34‍–‍47	43‍–‍38
Florida Marlins	72	90	.444	30	31‍–‍47	41‍–‍43

==== National League Wild Card ====
Division leaders
Team	W	L	Pct.
Philadelphia Phillies	102	60	.630
Milwaukee Brewers	96	66	.593
Arizona Diamondbacks	94	68	.580

Wild Card team (Top team qualifies for postseason)
Team	W	L	Pct.	GB
St. Louis Cardinals	90	72	.556	—
Atlanta Braves	89	73	.549	1
San Francisco Giants	86	76	.531	4
Los Angeles Dodgers	82	79	.509	7½
Washington Nationals	80	81	.497	9½
Cincinnati Reds	79	83	.488	11
New York Mets	77	85	.475	13
Colorado Rockies	73	89	.451	17
Florida Marlins	72	90	.444	18
Pittsburgh Pirates	72	90	.444	18
Chicago Cubs	71	91	.438	19
San Diego Padres	71	91	.438	19
Houston Astros	56	106	.346	34

=== Record vs. opponents ===
2011 National League record Source: MLB Standings Grid – 2011
Team	AZ	ATL	CHC	CIN	COL	FLA	HOU	LAD	MIL	NYM	PHI	PIT	SD	SF	STL	WSH	AL
Arizona	–	2–3	3–4	4–2	13–5	5–2	6–1	10–8	4–3	3–3	3–3	3–3	11–7	9–9	3–4	5–3	10–8
Atlanta	3–2	–	4–3	3–3	6–2	12–6	5–1	2–5	5–3	9–9	6–12	4–2	4–5	6–1	1–5	9–9	10–5
Chicago	4–3	3–4	–	7–11	2–4	3–3	8–7	3–3	6–10	4–2	2–5	8–8	3–3	5–4	5–10	3–4	5–10
Cincinnati	2–4	3–3	11–7	–	3–4	3–3	9–6	4–2	8–8	2–5	1–7	5–10	4–2	5–2	9–6	4–2	7–11
Colorado	5–13	2–6	4–2	4–3	–	3–3	5–2	9–9	3–6	5–2	1–4	4–3	9–9	5–13	2–4	4–3	8–7
Florida	2–5	6–12	3–3	3–3	3–3	–	6–1	3–3	0–7	9–9	6–12	6–0	0–7	4–2	2–6	11–7	8–10
Houston	1–6	1–5	7–8	6–9	2–5	1–6	–	4–5	3–12	3–3	2–4	7–11	3–5	4–3	5–10	3–3	4–11
Los Angeles	8–10	5–2	3–3	2–4	9–9	3–3	5–4	–	2–4	2–5	1–5	6–2	13–5	9–9	4–3	4–2	6–9
Milwaukee	3–4	3–5	10–6	8–8	6–3	7–0	12–3	4–2	–	4–2	3–4	12–3	3–2	3–3	9–9	3–3	6–9
New York	3–3	9–9	2–4	5–2	2–5	9–9	3–3	5–2	2–4	–	7–11	4–4	4–3	2–4	3–3	8–10	9–9
Philadelphia	3–3	12–6	5–2	7–1	4–1	12–6	4–2	5–1	4–3	11–7	–	4–2	7–1	4–3	3–6	8–10	9–6
Pittsburgh	3–3	2–4	8–8	10–5	3–4	0–6	11–7	2–6	3–12	4–4	2–4	–	2–4	3–3	7–9	4–4	8–7
San Diego	7–11	5–4	3–3	2–4	9–9	7–0	5–3	5–13	2–3	3–4	1–7	4–2	–	6–12	3–3	3–4	6–9
San Francisco	9–9	1–6	4–5	2–5	13–5	2–4	3–4	9–9	3–3	4–2	3–4	3–3	12–6	–	5–2	3–4	10–5
St. Louis	4–3	5–1	10–5	6–9	4–2	6–2	10–5	3–4	9–9	3–3	6–3	9–7	3–3	2–5	–	2–4	8–7
Washington	3–5	9–9	4–3	2–4	3–4	7–11	3–3	2–4	3–3	10–8	10–8	4–4	4–3	4–3	4–2	–	8–7

Opening Day starters
Position	Name
Starting Pitcher	Derek Lowe
Catcher	Brian McCann
First Baseman	Freddie Freeman
Second Baseman	Dan Uggla
Third Baseman	Chipper Jones
Shortstop	Álex González
Left Fielder	Martín Prado
Center Fielder	Nate McLouth
Right Fielder	Jason Heyward

=== Notable occurrences ===
March 31, 2011: On Opening Day versus the Washington Nationals, right-fielder Jason Heyward launched a home run in his first at-bat of the season. Combined with his first at-bat home run on Opening Day of 2010, Heyward became just the second player in major league history to hit a home run on his first at-bat in his first two Opening Day games. The other player was Kaz Matsui who did the feat in 2004 and 2005.

April 8, 2011: In the sixth inning of the first game of the season at Turner Field, long-time Braves third-baseman Chipper Jones notched his 2,500th career hit, a single off of Antonio Bastardo. Braves long-time skipper Bobby Cox was in attendance to view the milestone. Chipper is just the ninth switch hitter to reach the 2,500 hit plateau.

April 13, 2011: In the bottom of the ninth of a 1–5 loss to the Marlins, Chipper Jones hit a solo home run to collect the 1,500th RBI of his career. Combined with his hit milestone just five days prior, Chipper now stands with just Eddie Murray as the only switch-hitters in history to collect 2,500 hits and 1,500 RBIs in a career.

April 25, 2011: In his third major career milestone of the month, Chipper Jones collected his 500th career double to leadoff the top of the twelfth inning against the Padres. Chipper became just the 52nd player in MLB History and only the fourth switch-hitter to reach the milestone.

May 15, 2011: The May 15 series finale against the Philadelphia Phillies at Turner Field was the fifth annual Civil Rights Game, concluding four days of festivities in Atlanta. In a pre-game ceremony, Ernie Banks, Carlos Santana, and Morgan Freeman were honored with the Beacon of Life, Beacon of Change, and Beacon of Hope awards, respectively.

May 17, 2011: Down to the last strike and trailing by one run in the final game of a series against the Astros, Brian McCann hit a pinch-hit home run to tie the game. Two innings later, McCann hit another home run to win the game. According to the Elias Sports Bureau, McCann became just the second player in Major League history to hit a pinch-hit, game-tying home run in the ninth inning and then end an extra-inning game with another homer. The other player to achieve this was Jeff Heath for the Boston Braves in a 1949 win over the Reds.

June 12, 2011: With the 4–1 win against the Astros at Minute Maid Park, the team put the Braves franchise record since inception in the National League in 1876 at 9,983 wins and 9,982 losses. This was the first time since June 4, 1923, when the overall record was 3,084 wins and losses, that the overall franchise record was over .500.

July 7, 2011: Braves rookie closer Craig Kimbrel collected his twenty-seventh save of the season with the series-sweeping 6–3 win against the Colorado Rockies, setting a major league record for most saves by a rookie before the All-Star break. The previous record was held by Jonathan Papelbon, who had registered twenty-six saves during his rookie season in 2006. On June 3, Kimbrel broke the record for the most saves before the All-Star break by a National League rookie when he collected his seventeenth save against the Mets at Citi Field. The previous National League record holder was Yhency Brazobán, who had sixteen saves before the break for the Dodgers in 2005. Kimbrel entered the All-Star break with twenty-eight saves to set the mark for the new record.

July 15, 2011: In the first game after the All-Star break, the Braves defeated the Washington Nationals 11–1, earning the franchise its 10,000th win since inception into the National League in 1876. They, along with the San Francisco Giants and Chicago Cubs, are now the only Major League franchises with ten thousand or more wins.

July 26, 2011: Hosting the Pittsburgh Pirates for a four-game series at home, the Braves played the longest game in terms of time in franchise history. Starting at the scheduled 7:10 time in the evening, the marathon lasted six hours and thirty-nine minutes to end at 1:50 the following morning. The game, which ended with a very controversial walk-off for the Braves in the nineteenth inning, was the longest in terms of innings for the team since May 4, 1973, when a game against Philadelphia lasted twenty innings and ended in a Phillies victory.

August 12, 2011: The Braves announced in the off-season that Bobby Cox would be inducted into the Atlanta Braves Hall of Fame after having retired at the end of the 2010 season. As a part of the Braves Alumni Weekend, his number six was retired at a special luncheon and afterward an on-field ceremony was held to recognize the long-time Braves manager before the scheduled game versus the Chicago Cubs.

August 12, 2011: Having recorded a hit in every game since July 4, Braves second-basemen Dan Uggla ran his hitting streak up to 32 games with a second-inning solo home run off Carlos Zambrano, his first of two home runs on the night and the thirteenth home run of the streak. Uggla's long hitting streak set a new Atlanta Braves record, passing Rico Carty, who established a 31-game hitting streak in 1970. The only player with a longer streak in Braves franchise history is Tommy Holmes, who reached a 37-game streak in 1945 for the Boston team.

August 31, 2011: Closing out a 3–1 win against the Washington Nationals in front of a home crowd, Braves rookie closer Craig Kimbrel collected his 41st save of the season, setting a new major league record for most saves in a single season by a rookie closer. The previous record-holder was Neftalí Feliz, who saved forty games for the Texas Rangers during his rookie season in 2010. Kimbrel went on to finish the season with 46 saves to set the mark for the new rookie record.

September 8, 2011: While recording a no-decision in a 2–3 loss to the Phillies, Braves rookie pitcher Brandon Beachy set the record for most strikeouts in a season by an Atlanta Braves rookie by striking out Michael Martínez and recording his 140th strikeout. The old record of 139 strikeouts was previously held by Jair Jurrjens, who achieved that number in 2008.

September 28, 2011: Despite holding an 8 1/2-game lead in the Wild Card race on the first day of September, the Braves' horrible September win–loss record created a situation leading into Closing Day that almost mirrored the scenario presented on that day in 2010. The Braves again found themselves in a tie atop the Wild Card standings with just one scheduled game to play, this time with the St. Louis Cardinals. Taking on the Houston Astros in Houston on the final day, the Cardinals shutout their opponent 8–0 on a Chris Carpenter gem. Meanwhile, the Braves faced the Philadelphia Phillies at home to conclude their schedule. Despite a solid start by veteran Tim Hudson, the Braves fell to the Phillies 3–4 in thirteen innings, officially eliminating the team from playoff contention. It was the first time since June 8 that the Braves did not possess a portion of first place in the Wild Card standings.

=== September collapse ===
The Braves led the National League Wild Card standings for much of the 2011 season, with the division-rival Philadelphia Phillies firmly in control of first place in the National League East. The Braves entered the final month of the regular season 25 games above .500 with a record of 80–55 and an 8 1/2-game lead in the Wild Card standings. The nearest team trailing them, the St. Louis Cardinals, who also trailed the National League Central-leading Milwaukee Brewers by 8 1/2 games at the time, were considered a long-shot to gain a spot in the postseason. Just days prior on August 26, the Cardinals found themselves 10 1/2 games behind and in third place.

Having swept the New York Mets in a doubleheader at Citi Field on the previous day, the Braves traveled to St. Louis on September 9 to play the Cardinals in a three-game series. Entering the series, the Braves still held a 7 1/2-game lead on the Cardinals in the Wild Card standings. Gaining a 3–1 advantage on the Cardinals entering the bottom of the ninth inning in the first game of the series, Braves rookie and eventual Major League Baseball Rookie of the Year Award winner Craig Kimbrel suffered his first blown save since June 8, ending a string of 25 straight converted saves and a personal scoreless innings streak of 37 2/3. With two outs and the bases loaded, Cardinals first baseman Albert Pujols sent a ball down the right field line that scored two to tie the game at three. In the bottom of the tenth, the Cardinals won on a Nick Punto line drive. The disheartening loss, which eroded the Braves' lead down to 6 1/2 games, proved to be a turning point for both teams. The Cardinals went on to win the last two games of the series, lowering the team's Wild Card advantage to 4 1/2 games with 15 games to play.

The Braves played decently in the subsequent homestand, going 3–3 against the Florida Marlins and New York Mets; however, the Cardinals, who went on a seven-game roadtrip to play the Pittsburgh Pirates and Philadelphia Phillies, went 5–2 over the same stretch. With nine games to play for both teams, the Braves' lead still held at three games. The Braves exited the homestand for a three-game series in Sun Life Stadium against the Florida Marlins. In the first game of the series on September 19, the team found themselves in a quick 0–2 hole. The offense rallied in the seventh inning, however, and lead the Marlins 5–4 going into the bottom of the ninth. Again closer Craig Kimbrel entered to give the team a much needed win. With two outs and no one on base, Emilio Bonifacio hit a slow grounder to Braves veteran third baseman Chipper Jones. Apparently losing the ball in the lights, Jones committed a fielding error that allowed Bonifacio to reach base. Two pitches later, Omar Infante, who the Braves had traded to the Marlins in the previous offseason, hit a two-run home run to left field that gave the Marlins a 6–5 win, stunning the Braves. The club split the final two games of the series, putting them at 88–68 on the season. The Cardinals, however, took two of three from the Mets at home, shrinking the Braves' lead even further to a mere two games.

With just two series remaining apiece for both the Braves and Cardinals, the Braves traveled to Nationals Park to play the Washington Nationals in their final road series of the season while the Cardinals remained at Busch Stadium for their final home series of the year. Braves veteran ace Tim Hudson pitched well enough to give the Braves a win in the first game of their series, while the Cardinals struggled against Ryan Dempster and the Chicago Cubs. After the Cardinals loss, the Milwaukee Brewers officially clinched the National League Central. With five games to play, the Braves' lead returned to three games. The final two games of the Nationals series proved to be an offensive struggle for the Braves, scoring only one run between the two games and losing both of them. The Cardinals, meanwhile, edged out the Cubs with one-run victories in the final two games of their series. Entering the final series of the regular season, the Braves' once mighty lead was reduced to a mere game.

The Braves returned home to Turner Field to host the Philadelphia Phillies, who had already clinched the National League East while the Cardinals traveled to Minute Maid Park to play the Houston Astros, a team that had already lost 104 games and was 39 games behind in the standings. Facing two Phillie aces in Cliff Lee and Roy Oswalt in the first two games of the series, the Braves found little success, losing the games by scores of 2–4 and 1–7, respectively. In the first game of the series in Houston, the Cardinals lost a close game in ten innings by a score of 4–5. The following game, however, resulted in a Cardinals blowout, finishing with a final score of 13–7. For the first time since June 8, the Braves had lost their lead in the Wild Card.

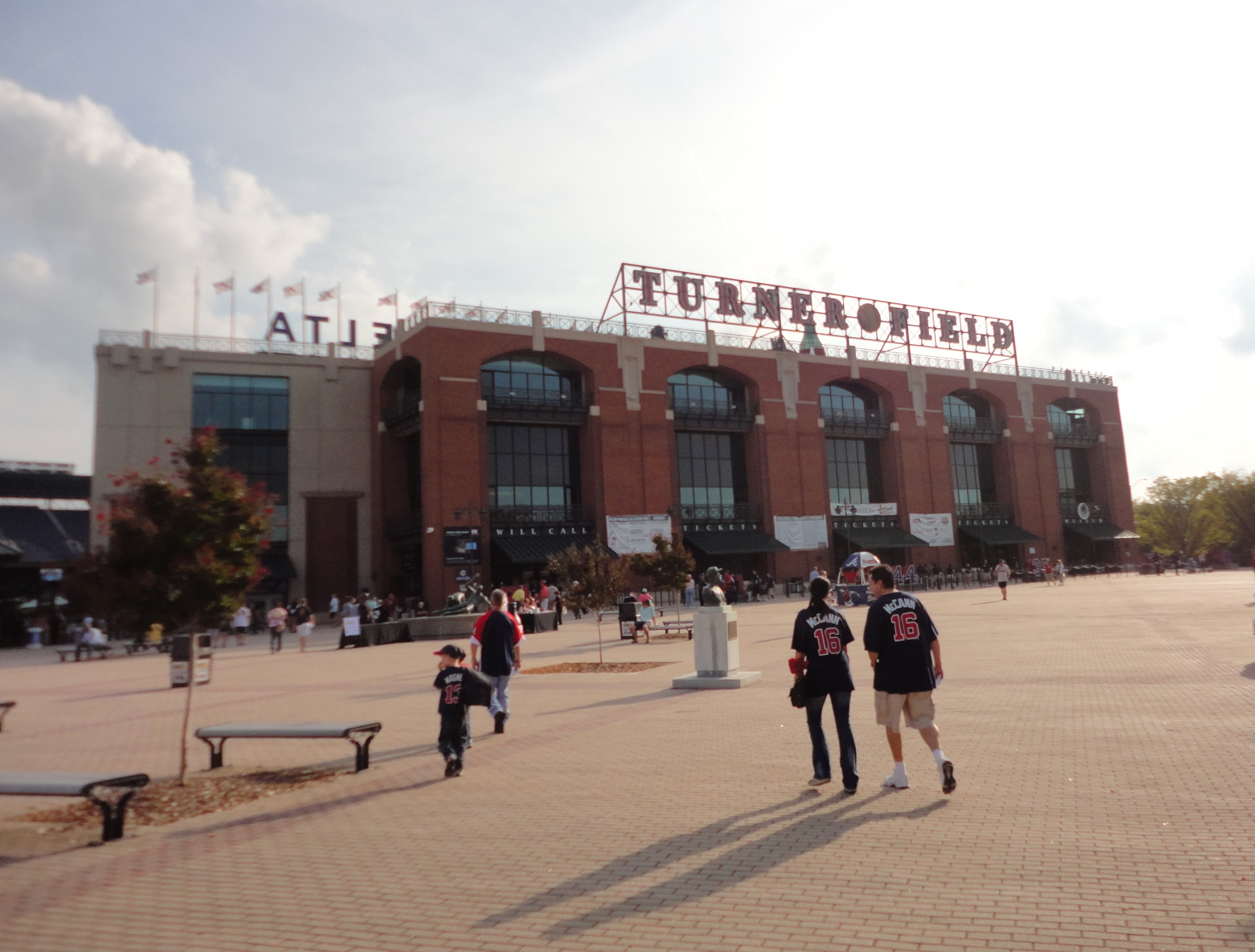
Turner Field two hours before the start of the final game of the season.

The Braves and Cardinals entered the final scheduled day of the regular season with the Wild Card standings tied between the two clubs. The situation was one familiar to the Braves, who were tied with the San Diego Padres in the Wild Card standings on the final day of the 2010 season. Starting one hour before the Cardinals-Astros game, the Braves tossed veteran ace Tim Hudson against a Phillies pitching staff that was preparing for the 2011 National League Division Series. After giving up a run to the Phillies in the first inning and scoring one of their own in the bottom half, Braves second baseman Dan Uggla launched a two-run home run in the third inning that gave the Braves a 3–1 advantage. Meanwhile, the game in Houston began with the Cardinals scoring five runs in the top of the first. With veteran Cardinals' ace Chris Carpenter pitching for the Cardinals, the game was already out of reach. The Cardinals would sail to an 8–0 victory that assured at worst a tiebreaker at Busch Stadium the following night. Back in Atlanta, the Phillies scored a run in the seventh to reduce the Braves' lead to one run. With the Cardinals game having already gone final, rookie closer Craig Kimbrel entered from the bullpen hoping to send the Braves to a tiebreaker game in St. Louis. After a leadoff single, Kimbrel struck out the next batter for the first out of the inning, but followed with two walks to load the bases. The next batter, Chase Utley, lofted a fly ball to deep left field, scoring the runner from third on a sacrifice fly to knot the game at three apiece. After another walk, Kimbrel finally got out of the inning. The score remained tied until the thirteenth inning when the Phillies rallied for a run. With two outs and runners on first and third, Hunter Pence, who was acquired by the Phillies in a midseason trade with the Houston Astros, sent a ground ball that reached the outfield grass for a single. The Braves needed a run to avoid an unfathomable ending to their season. After a leadoff strikeout, Dan Uggla reached base on a walk. Braves rookie first baseman Freddie Freeman, however, followed with a groundball double play, ending the inning, sending the Braves home, and sending the Cardinals to the National League Division Series to face the Phillies. After sweeping the Braves to allow the Cardinals into the postseason, the Phillies lost the NLDS to the Cardinals in five games. The Cardinals would go on to win the 2011 National League pennant in six games over Milwaukee in the NLCS, and the 2011 World Series in seven games over the AL Champion Texas Rangers.

With 27 games to play, the Braves went 9–18 in September to finish the season with a record of 89–73. The Cardinals, meanwhile, went 18–8 to finish at 90–72. Braves closer Craig Kimbrel, who had not surrendered a single earned run in July or August, carried a 4.76 ERA in September with three blown saves. After being dominant in his role for much of the season, Braves setup man Jonny Venters posted a 5.11 September ERA. These sharp declines in both relievers led many critics to question the handling of the bullpen by Braves manager Fredi González. Veteran starter Derek Lowe posted a win–loss record of 0–5 in September with an ERA of 8.75. Shortly into the offseason, Lowe would be traded to the Cleveland Indians. The Braves starters lasted six or more innings only three times over the last 23 games. Over the last five games, all of which were losses for the Braves, the team managed to score only seven runs. Braves catcher Brian McCann, often regarded as the best offensive catcher in the Majors, hit only .183 with two home runs in September. The offense as a whole hit for only a .235 batting average and a .300 on-base percentage in September, both second-worst in the National League. The .195 RISP average by Braves hitters was second worst in the Majors. Hitting coach Larry Parrish was fired two days following the last game of the season.

=== Game log ===
2011 Atlanta Braves Schedule

Legend
Braves Win	Braves Loss	Game postponed	Eliminated from playoff spot

2011 Regular Season Game Log
March (1–0)

#	Date	Opponent	Score	Win	Loss	Save	Attendance	Time	Record
1	March 31	@ Nationals	2–0	Lowe (1–0)	Hernández (0–1)	Kimbrel (1)	39,055	2:32	1–0

April (12–15)

#	Date	Opponent	Score	Win	Loss	Save	Attendance	Time	Record
2	April 2	@ Nationals	3–6	Lannan (1–0)	Hanson (0–1)	Burnett (1)	21,941	2:56	1–1
3	April 3	@ Nationals	11–2	Hudson (1–0)	Zimmermann (0–1)		22,210	2:47	2–1
4	April 4	@ Brewers	2–1	Moylan (1–0)	Saito (0–1)	Kimbrel (2)	46,017	2:49	3–1
5	April 5	@ Brewers	0–1	Gallardo (1–0)	Lowe (1–1)		24,117	2:21	3–2
6	April 6	@ Brewers	4–5	Estrada (1–0)	Minor (0–1)	Axford (1)	23,420	2:36	3–3
7	April 7	@ Brewers	2–4	Marcum (1–1)	Hanson (0–2)	Axford (2)	24,645	2:50	3–4
8	April 8	Phillies	6–3	Hudson (2–0)	Lee (1–1)	Kimbrel (3)	51,331	2:46	4–4
9	April 9	Phillies	2–10	Oswalt (2–0)	Beachy (0–1)		36,256	2:44	4–5
10	April 10	Phillies	0–3	Hamels (1–1)	Lowe (1–2)	Contreras (2)	43,796	2:20	4–6
11	April 12	Marlins	5–0	Hanson (1–2)	Volstad (0–1)		13,865	2:33	5–6
12	April 13	Marlins	1–5	Johnson (2–0)	Hudson (2–1)		14,351	2:20	5–7
13	April 14	Marlins	5–6	Sanches (2–0)	O'Flaherty (0–1)	Núñez (4)	16,495	3:09	5–8
X	April 15	Mets	Rescheduled for April 16						5–8
14	April 16	Mets	4–2	Lowe (2–2)	Carrasco (0–1)	Kimbrel (4)		2:47	6–8
15	April 16	Mets	4–0	Jurrjens (1–0)	Pelfrey (0–2)		31,383	2:29	7–8
16	April 17	Mets	2–3	Gee (0–1)	Hanson (1–3)	Rodríguez (2)	29,625	2:52	7–9
17	April 18	@ Dodgers	2–4	Lilly (1–2)	Hudson (2–2)		28,292	2:52	7–10
18	April 19	@ Dodgers	10–1	Beachy (1–1)	Kuroda (2–2)		41,596	3:19	8–10
19	April 20	@ Dodgers	1–6	Garland (1–1)	Lowe (2–3)		29,473	2:17	8–11
20	April 21	@ Dodgers	3–5 (12)	Guerrier (1–0)	Martínez (0–1)		30,711	3:52	8–12
21	April 22	@ Giants	4–1	Hanson (2–3)	Bumgarner (0–3)	Kimbrel (5)	42,404	2:42	9–12
22	April 23	@ Giants	5–2	Hudson (3–2)	Lincecum (2–2)	Kimbrel (6)	42,395	2:41	10–12
23	April 24	@ Giants	9–6 (10)	O'Flaherty (1–1)	Wilson (0–1)	Venters (1)	42,295	3:26	11–12
24	April 25	@ Padres	3–5 (13)	Luebke (1–1)	Martínez (0–2)		18,288	3:36	11–13
25	April 26	@ Padres	8–2	Jurrjens (2–0)	Harang (4–1)		20,492	2:24	12–13
26	April 27	@ Padres	7–0	Hanson (3–3)	Latos (0–4)		20,026	2:34	13–13
27	April 29	Cardinals	3–5 (11)	Sánchez (1–0)	Gearrin (0–1)	Miller (1)	40,279	3:29	13–14
28	April 30	Cardinals	2–3	Batista (2–1)	Kimbrel (0–1)	Salas (2)	30,546	2:54	13–15

May (17–11)

#	Date	Opponent	Score	Win	Loss	Save	Attendance	Time	Record
29	May 1	Cardinals	6–5	Venters (1–0)	Franklin (0–3)		34,129	2:55	14–15
30	May 2	Brewers	6–2	Jurrjens (3–0)	Gallardo (2–2)		14,126	2:37	15–15
X	May 3	Brewers	Rescheduled for May 4						15–15
31	May 4	Brewers	8–3	Hanson (4–3)	Estrada (1–1)			3:14	16–15
32	May 4	Brewers	8–0	Hudson (4–2)	Greinke (0–1)		15,543	2:43	17–15
33	May 5	Brewers	2–1	Venters (2–0)	Loe (2–3)	Kimbrel (7)	15,307	2:39	18–15
34	May 6	@ Phillies	5–0	Lowe (3–3)	Lee (2–3)		45,495	2:40	19–15
35	May 7	@ Phillies	0–3	Kendrick (2–2)	Teherán (0–1)	Madson (3)	45,609	2:44	19–16
36	May 8	@ Phillies	5–2	Jurrjens (4–0)	Hamels (4–2)	Kimbrel (8)	45,619	2:53	20–16
37	May 10	Nationals	6–7	Marquis (4–1)	Hudson (4–3)	Storen (8)	16,143	2:39	20–17
38	May 11	Nationals	3–7 (11)	Storen (3–1)	Linebrink (0–1)		16,692	3:32	20–18
39	May 12	Nationals	6–5 (10)	Kimbrel (1–1)	Slaten (0–1)		19,758	3:04	21–18
40	May 13	Phillies	4–5	Bastardo (2–0)	O'Flaherty (1–2)	Madson (6)	36,168	3:04	21–19
41	May 14	Phillies	5–3	Jurrjens (5–0)	Blanton (1–2)	Kimbrel (9)	35,238	2:39	22–19
42	May 15	Phillies	3–2	Venters (3–0)	Halladay (5–3)	Kimbrel (10)	42,117	2:38	23–19
43	May 16	Astros	3–2	Hanson (5–3)	Abad (1–4)	Kimbrel (11)	17,416	2:44	24–19
44	May 17	Astros	3–1 (11)	Gearrin (1–1)	Fulchino (0–2)		21,085	3:09	25–19
44	May 18	@ Diamondbacks	4–5 (11)	Heilman (2–0)	Kimbrel (1–2)		19,773	3:19	25–20
46	May 19	@ Diamondbacks	1–2	Collmenter (2–0)	Jurrjens (5–1)	Putz (10)	23,413	2:19	25–21
47	May 20	@ Angels	0–9	Santana (2–4)	Hudson (4–4)		40,211	2:28	25–22
48	May 21	@ Angels	5–4 (12)	Proctor (1–0)	Bell (1–1)	Kimbrel (12)	43,511	3:57	26–22
49	May 22	@ Angels	1–4	Chatwood (3–2)	Lowe (3–4)	Walden (8)	40,098	2:37	26–23
50	May 24	@ Pirates	2–0	Jurrjens (6–1)	Morton (5–2)	Kimbrel (13)	16,873	2:33	27–23
51	May 25	@ Pirates	4–2 (11)	Sherrill (1–0)	Karstens (3–3)	Kimbrel (14)	21,497	3:16	28–23
52	May 27	Reds	1–5	Leake (4–2)	Hanson (5–4)		30,701	3:27	28–24
53	May 28	Reds	7–6 (12)	Linebrink (1–1)	Fisher (0–2)		36,615	4:03	29–24
54	May 29	Reds	2–1	Jurrjens (7–1)	Cueto (2–2)	Kimbrel (15)	36,392	2:29	30–24
55	May 30	Padres	2–3 (10)	Qualls (3–2)	Sherrill (1–1)	Bell (13)	25,832	3:12	30–25
56	May 31	Padres	4–5	Latos (3–6)	Minor (0–2)	Bell (14)	18,782	3:12	30–26

June (17–9)

#	Date	Opponent	Score	Win	Loss	Save	Attendance	Time	Record
57	June 1	Padres	4–3	Hanson (6–4)	Richard (2–6)	Kimbrel (16)	21,452	2:52	31–26
58	June 3	@ Mets	6–3	Venters (4–0)	Rodríguez (1–2)	Kimbrel (17)	28,301	2:35	32–26
59	June 4	@ Mets	0–5	Gee (6–0)	Jurrjens (7–2)		28,114	2:19	32–27
60	June 5	@ Mets	4–6	Dickey (3–6)	Hudson (4–5)		21,015	2:42	32–28
61	June 7	@ Marlins	1–0	Hanson (7–4)	Hand (0–1)	Kimbrel (18)	13,302	2:41	33–28
62	June 8	@ Marlins	3–2 (10)	Kimbrel (2–2)	Dunn (4–4)	Linebrink (1)	14,626	3:14	34–28
63	June 9	@ Marlins	3–2	Jurrjens (8–2)	Volstad (2–6)	Venters (2)	16,613	2:46	35–28
64	June 10	@ Astros	11–4	Hudson (5–5)	Rodríguez (0–4)		29,252	3:00	36–28
65	June 11	@ Astros	6–3 (10)	Linebrink (2–1)	Lyon (3–3)		32,117	3:20	37–28
66	June 12	@ Astros	4–1	Hanson (8–4)	Myers (2–6)	Venters (3)	23,765	2:33	38–28
67	June 13	@ Astros	3–8	Rodríguez (4–3)	Lowe (3–5)		21,466	2:39	38–29
68	June 14	Mets	3–4	Niese (6–5)	Jurrjens (8–3)	Rodríguez (19)	32,161	3:03	38–30
69	June 15	Mets	0–4	Parnell (1–1)	Hudson (5–6)		31,161	2:27	38–31
70	June 16	Mets	9–8 (10)	Linebrink (3–1)	Carrasco (0–2)		26,077	3:26	39–31
71	June 17	Rangers	2–6	Lewis (6–7)	Delgado (0–1)		38,810	2:57	39–32
72	June 18	Rangers	4–5 (10)	Lowe (2–1)	Proctor (1–1)	Feliz (14)	44,600	3:15	39–33
73	June 19	Rangers	4–2	Jurrjens (9–3)	Ogando (7–2)	Kimbrel (19)	34,599	3:34	40–33
74	June 20	Blue Jays	2–0	Hudson (6–6)	Romero (6–7)	Kimbrel (20)	22,937	2:20	41–33
75	June 21	Blue Jays	5–1	Minor (1–2)	Stewart (0–1)		26,849	2:22	42–33
76	June 22	Blue Jays	5–1	Beachy (2–1)	Reyes (3–6)		23,152	2:39	43–33
77	June 24	@ Padres	2–11	Stauffer (3–5)	Lowe (3–6)		27,227	2:36	43–34
78	June 25	@ Padres	10–1	Jurrjens (10–3)	Moseley (2–7)		38,060	3:01	44–34
79	June 26	@ Padres	1–4	Adams (3–1)	Venters (4–1)	Bell (20)	24,048	2:53	44–35
80	June 27	@ Mariners	3–1	Beachy (3–1)	Bédard (4–6)	Kimbrel (21)	26,467	2:38	45–35
81	June 28	@ Mariners	5–4	Hanson (9–4)	Pineda (7–5)	Kimbrel (22)	21,769	3:04	46–35
82	June 29	@ Mariners	5–3	Lowe (4–6)	Hernández (8–7)	Kimbrel (23)	30,472	2:35	47–35

July (16–11)

#	Date	Opponent	Score	Win	Loss	Save	Attendance	Time	Record
83	July 1	Orioles	4–0	Jurrjens (11–3)	Guthrie (3–10)		33,261	2:19	48–35
84	July 2	Orioles	5–4	Hudson (7–6)	Arrieta (9–5)	Kimbrel (24)	37,259	2:42	49–35
85	July 3	Orioles	4–5	Johnson (5–1)	Proctor (1–2)	Gregg (15)	23,492	3:09	49–36
86	July 4	Rockies	4–1	Hanson (10–4)	Jiménez (3–8)	Kimbrel (25)	36,137	2:54	50–36
87	July 5	Rockies	5–3	Lowe (5–6)	Chacín (8–6)	Kimbrel (26)	17,718	2:50	51–36
88	July 6	Rockies	9–1	Jurrjens (12–3)	Cook (0–4)		26,271	2:55	52–36
89	July 7	Rockies	6–3	Hudson (8–6)	Nicasio (3–2)	Kimbrel (27)	21,541	3:16	53–36
90	July 8	@ Phillies	2–3 (10)	Perez (1–0)	Proctor (1–3)		45,403	3:00	53–37
91	July 9	@ Phillies	4–1 (11)	Sherrill (2–1)	Stutes (3–1)	Kimbrel (28)	45,637	3:15	54–37
92	July 10	@ Phillies	1–14	Hamels (11–4)	Lowe (5–7)		45,853	2:49	54–38
–	July 12	2011 Major League Baseball All-Star Game in Phoenix, Arizona							
93	July 15	Nationals	11–1	Hudson (9–6)	Hernández (5–9)		34,106	2:56	55–38
94	July 16	Nationals	2–5	Lannan (6–6)	Hanson (10–5)	Storen (24)	42,456	3:01	55–39
95	July 17	Nationals	9–8	Kimbrel (3–2)	Mattheus (2–1)		30,314	3:20	56–39
96	July 18	@ Rockies	7–4	Lowe (6–7)	Hammel (5–9)	Kimbrel (29)	35,103	2:49	57–39
97	July 19	@ Rockies	3–12	Jiménez (6–8)	Beachy (3–2)		36,460	3:00	57–40
98	July 20	@ Rockies	2–3	Street (1–3)	O'Flaherty (1–3)		39,339	2:51	57–41
99	July 21	@ Rockies	9–6	Hanson (11–5)	Reynolds (0–2)	Kimbrel (30)	39,262	3:29	58–41
100	July 22	@ Reds	6–4	Venters (5–1)	Masset (1–4)	Kimbrel (31)	34,118	2:46	59–41
101	July 23	@ Reds	2–11	Bailey (5–4)	Lowe (6–8)		41,192	2:59	59–42
102	July 24	@ Reds	3–4	Cordero (4–3)	Linebrink (3–2)		33,036	2:48	59–43
103	July 25	Pirates	1–3	McDonald (7–4)	Hudson (9–7)	Hanrahan (29)	30,098	3:17	59–44
104	July 26	Pirates	4–3 (19)	Proctor (2–3)	McCutchen (3–2)		22,036	6:39	60–44
105	July 27	Pirates	2–1 (10)	Linebrink (4–2)	Leroux (1–1)		22,186	3:14	61–44
106	July 28	Pirates	2–5	Correia (12–8)	Lowe (6–9)	Hanrahan (30)	38,355	2:59	61–45
107	July 29	Marlins	5–0	Beachy (4–2)	Hensley (1–3)		36,063	2:34	62–45
108	July 30	Marlins	5–1	Hudson (10–7)	Sánchez (6–4)		40,656	2:37	63–45
109	July 31	Marlins	1–3	Nolasco (8–7)	Hanson (11–6)	Núñez (30)	23,085	3:00	63–46

August (17–9)

#	Date	Opponent	Score	Win	Loss	Save	Attendance	Time	Record
110	August 1	@ Nationals	3–5	Hernández (6–10)	Jurrjens (12–4)	Storen (27)	19,940	2:30	63–47
111	August 2	@ Nationals	3–9	Lannan (8–7)	Lowe (6–10)		24,326	2:42	63–48
112	August 3	@ Nationals	6–4	Beachy (5–2)	Wang (0–2)	Kimbrel (32)	20,043	2:56	64–48
113	August 5	@ Mets	4–1	Hudson (11–7)	Dickey (5–10)	Kimbrel (33)	30,607	2:43	65–48
114	August 6	@ Mets	7–11	Niese (11–8)	Hanson (11–7)		33,556	3:12	65–49
115	August 7	@ Mets	6–5	Venters (6–1)	Parnell (3–4)	Kimbrel (34)	29,853	3:25	66–49
116	August 8	@ Marlins	8–5	Lowe (7–10)	Hand (1–4)	Kimbrel (35)	20,330	2:59	67–49
117	August 9	@ Marlins	4–3 (11)	Sherrill (3–1)	Mujica (8–4)	Kimbrel (36)	21,337	3:32	68–49
118	August 10	@ Marlins	6–2	Hudson (12–7)	Sánchez (6–6)	Venters (4)	22,104	3:08	69–49
119	August 12	Cubs	10–4	Minor (2–2)	Zambrano (9–7)		50,146	2:29	70–49
120	August 13	Cubs	4–8	Wells (4–4)	Lowe (7–11)	Mármol (27)	49,781	3:10	70–50
121	August 14	Cubs	5–6	Grabow (3–0)	O'Flaherty (1–4)	Mármol (28)	32,011	3:21	70–51
122	August 15	Giants	5–4	Martínez (1–2)	Wilson (6–4)		23,498	2:50	71–51
123	August 16	Giants	2–1 (11)	Vizcaíno (1–0)	Lopez (5–2)		22,108	2:59	72–51
124	August 17	Giants	5–7	Cain (10–9)	Jurrjens (12–5)		22,202	2:48	72–52
125	August 18	Giants	1–0	Minor (3–2)	Lincecum (11–10)	Kimbrel (37)	30,720	2:30	73–52
126	August 19	Diamondbacks	4–2	Lowe (8–11)	Hudson (12–9)	Kimbrel (38)	30,142	2:47	74–52
127	August 20	Diamondbacks	8–1	Beachy (6–2)	Miley (0–1)		39,294	2:47	75–52
128	August 21	Diamondbacks	1–0	Hudson (13–7)	Collmenter (7–8)	Kimbrel (39)	34,846	2:33	76–52
129	August 22	@ Cubs	3–0	Jurrjens (13–5)	Dempster (10–9)	Venters (5)	37,061	2:49	77–52
130	August 23	@ Cubs	5–4	Minor (4–2)	Coleman (2–6)	Kimbrel (40)	36,639	2:52	78–52
131	August 24	@ Cubs	2–3	Wells (5–4)	Lowe (8–12)	Mármol (30)	37,098	2:36	78–53
132	August 25	@ Cubs	8–3	Beachy (7–2)	Garza (6–10)		36,136	2:50	79–53
133	August 26	@ Mets	0–6	Capuano (10–11)	Hudson (13–8)		22,736	2:35	79–54
X	August 27	@ Mets	Rescheduled for September 8						79–54
X	August 28	@ Mets	Rescheduled for September 8						79–54
134	August 30	Nationals	2–9	Hernández (8–12)	Jurrjens (13–6)		16,674	2:44	79–55
135	August 31	Nationals	3–1	Lowe (9–12)	Lannan (8–11)	Kimbrel (41)	20,687	2:12	80–55

September (9–18)

#	Date	Opponent	Score	Win	Loss	Save	Attendance	Time	Record
136	September 1	Nationals	5–2	Hudson (14–8)	Wang (2–3)	Kimbrel (42)	18,794	2:48	81–55
137	September 2	Dodgers	6–8	Kuo (1–2)	Vizcaíno (1–1)	Guerra (14)	32,563	3:35	81–56
138	September 3	Dodgers	1–2 (10)	MacDougal (2–1)	Varvaro (0–1)	Guerra (15)	37,515	3:25	81–57
139	September 4	Dodgers	4–3	Kimbrel (4–2)	Hawksworth (2–5)		33,852	3:15	82–57
140	September 5	@ Phillies	0–9	Lee (16–7)	Lowe (9–13)		45,267	2:24	82–58
141	September 6	@ Phillies	3–6	Worley (11–1)	Hudson (14–9)	Madson (28)	44,781	3:05	82–59
142	September 7	@ Phillies	2–3	Madson (4–2)	Moylan (1–1)		44,870	3:01	82–60
143	September 8	@ Mets	6–5	Minor (5–2)	Schwinden (0–1)	Kimbrel (43)		3:13	83–60
144	September 8	@ Mets	5–1	Teherán (1–1)	Gee (12–6)		25,953	2:48	84–60
145	September 9	@ Cardinals	3–4 (10)	Motte (4–2)	Linebrink (4–3)		37,129	3:37	84–61
146	September 10	@ Cardinals	3–4	García (12–7)	Lowe (9–14)	Motte (4)	40,689	2:31	84–62
147	September 11	@ Cardinals	3–6	Westbrook (12–8)	Hudson (14–10)	Motte (5)	39,710	2:22	84–63
148	September 12	Marlins	4–5 (12)	Hensley (4–6)	Varvaro (0–2)	Núñez (35)	17,216	4:18	84–64
149	September 13	Marlins	7–1	Moylan (2–1)	Hand (1–7)		22,707	2:56	85–64
150	September 14	Marlins	4–1	O'Flaherty (2–4)	Nolasco (10–11)	Kimbrel (44)	22,245	2:22	86–64
151	September 16	Mets	2–12	Capuano (11–12)	Lowe (9–15)		43,901	3:24	86–65
152	September 17	Mets	1–0	Hudson (15–10)	Dickey (8–13)	Kimbrel (45)	46,763	2:22	87–65
153	September 18	Mets	5–7	Byrdak (2–0)	Venters (6–2)	Acosta (2)	39,862	3:18	87–66
154	September 19	@ Marlins	5–6	Hensley (6–6)	Kimbrel (4–3)		21,340	2:44	87–67
155	September 20	@ Marlins	4–0	Delgado (1–1)	Sánchez (8–9)		21,733	3:02	88–67
156	September 21	@ Marlins	0–4	Vázquez (12–11)	Lowe (9–16)		22,240	2:35	88–68
157	September 23	@ Nationals	7–4	Hudson (16–10)	Strasburg (0–1)	Kimbrel (46)	28,817	3:10	89–68
158	September 24	@ Nationals	1–4	Wang (4–3)	Beachy (7–3)	Storen (41)	33,986	2:47	89–69
159	September 25	@ Nationals	0–3	Detwiler (4–5)	Minor (5–3)	Storen (42)	37,638	2:42	89–70
160	September 26	Phillies	2–4	Lee (17–8)	Martínez (1–3)	Madson (32)	42,597	2:56	89–71
161	September 27	Phillies	1–7	Oswalt (9–10)	Lowe (9–17)		38,633	2:30	89–72
162	September 28	Phillies	3–4 (13)	De Fratus (1–0)	Linebrink (4–4)	Herndon (1)	45,350	4:30	89–73

=== Composite box score ===
Inning	1	2	3	4	5	6	7	8	9	10	11	12	13	14	15	16	17	18	19	Total
Atlanta Braves	75	66	92	55	62	78	79	54	56	11	10	2	0	0	0	0	0	0	1	641
Opponents	82	58	64	80	57	74	95	43	32	6	8	3	3	0	0	0	0	0	0	605

- Source: Baseball Reference

=== Midseason transactions ===
Date	Team	Acquired by Braves	Traded from Braves
July 31	Houston Astros	CF Michael Bourn	CF Jordan Schafer; RHP Juan Abreu; LHP Brett Oberholtzer; RHP Paul Clemens
August 31	Pittsburgh Pirates	LF Matt Diaz	RHP Eliecer Cardenas
August 31	Seattle Mariners	IF Jack Wilson	Player to be named

=== Accolades and awards ===
See: Atlanta Braves award winners and league leaders

==== Midseason accolades ====
All-Star Selections

- Brian McCann – Starting catcher (Sixth All-Star Game)
- Jair Jurrjens – Relief pitcher (First All-Star Game)
- Jonny Venters – Relief pitcher (First All-Star Game)
- Craig Kimbrel – Relief pitcher (First All-Star Game)
- Chipper Jones – Reserve third-baseman (Seventh All-Star Game) Injured, did not play

MLB Player of the Month

- Dan Uggla – August; Player of the Month for the National League

MLB Pitcher of the Month

- Jair Jurrjens – May; Pitcher of the Month for the National League

MLB Rookie of the Month

- Craig Kimbrel – June; Rookie of the Month for the National League
- Freddie Freeman – July; Rookie of the Month for the National League
- Craig Kimbrel – August; Rookie of the Month for the National League

MLB Player of the Week

- Martín Prado – May 9–15; Player of the Week for the National League

==== Postseason accolades ====
Silver Slugger Award

- Brian McCann – Silver Slugger Award for Catcher

Major League Baseball Rookie of the Year Award

- Craig Kimbrel – Rookie of the Year for the National League

=== Controversies ===
==== Roger McDowell allegation ====
After the April 23 game against the San Francisco Giants at AT&T Park, Braves pitching coach Roger McDowell was accused of making homophobic statements and gestures toward a group of men who attended the game. High-profile attorney Gloria Allred staged a press conference on April 27 to announce these allegations made by Justin Quinn of Fresno, California. Quinn alleges McDowell made crude sexual gestures in the direction of three men during batting practice before the game started. In response to the allegations, McDowell stated that he is deeply sorry about his response to the fans in San Francisco, and apologized to everyone involved. On April 28, it was announced that the Atlanta Braves organization was conducting an investigation into the incident. In a statement, Major League Baseball commissioner Bud Selig said that he would take action when the results of the investigation were released.

On April 29, McDowell was placed on administrative leave until the investigation was complete. In response, the team named minor league pitching coordinator Dave Wallace to serve as the pitching coach in the interim. On May 1, Major League Baseball levied a two-week suspension against McDowell, retroactive to April 29. McDowell was required to attend sensitivity training and personally apologize to Quinn. In response, Braves president John Schuerholz said he agreed with MLB's discipline measures.

==== Derek Lowe DUI ====
Around ten in the evening of the scheduled off-day on April 28, Braves starting pitcher Derek Lowe was arrested in the Buckhead area of Atlanta and charged with a DUI. The arresting officer, detecting a strong odor from Lowe's vehicle, gave Lowe a field sobriety test. He was subsequently taken to and booked in the Atlanta City Jail. Being released the following afternoon, Lowe said in a statement that he was truly sorry to his family, friends, teammates, fans, and the Braves organization and hoped that the matter would not distract the team.

Nearly a month later on May 26, Cory Yager, the attorney for Derek Lowe, confirmed that the DUI charges have been dropped. Yager cited the reason as a lack of evidence.

=== Record vs. opponents ===
2011 National League record Source: MLB Standings Grid – 2011
Team	AZ	ATL	CHC	CIN	COL	FLA	HOU	LAD	MIL	NYM	PHI	PIT	SD	SF	STL	WSH	AL
Arizona	–	2–3	3–4	4–2	13–5	5–2	6–1	10–8	4–3	3–3	3–3	3–3	11–7	9–9	3–4	5–3	10–8
Atlanta	3–2	–	4–3	3–3	6–2	12–6	5–1	2–5	5–3	9–9	6–12	4–2	4–5	6–1	1–5	9–9	10–5
Chicago	4–3	3–4	–	7–11	2–4	3–3	8–7	3–3	6–10	4–2	2–5	8–8	3–3	5–4	5–10	3–4	5–10
Cincinnati	2–4	3–3	11–7	–	3–4	3–3	9–6	4–2	8–8	2–5	1–7	5–10	4–2	5–2	9–6	4–2	7–11
Colorado	5–13	2–6	4–2	4–3	–	3–3	5–2	9–9	3–6	5–2	1–4	4–3	9–9	5–13	2–4	4–3	8–7
Florida	2–5	6–12	3–3	3–3	3–3	–	6–1	3–3	0–7	9–9	6–12	6–0	0–7	4–2	2–6	11–7	8–10
Houston	1–6	1–5	7–8	6–9	2–5	1–6	–	4–5	3–12	3–3	2–4	7–11	3–5	4–3	5–10	3–3	4–11
Los Angeles	8–10	5–2	3–3	2–4	9–9	3–3	5–4	–	2–4	2–5	1–5	6–2	13–5	9–9	4–3	4–2	6–9
Milwaukee	3–4	3–5	10–6	8–8	6–3	7–0	12–3	4–2	–	4–2	3–4	12–3	3–2	3–3	9–9	3–3	6–9
New York	3–3	9–9	2–4	5–2	2–5	9–9	3–3	5–2	2–4	–	7–11	4–4	4–3	2–4	3–3	8–10	9–9
Philadelphia	3–3	12–6	5–2	7–1	4–1	12–6	4–2	5–1	4–3	11–7	–	4–2	7–1	4–3	3–6	8–10	9–6
Pittsburgh	3–3	2–4	8–8	10–5	3–4	0–6	11–7	2–6	3–12	4–4	2–4	–	2–4	3–3	7–9	4–4	8–7
San Diego	7–11	5–4	3–3	2–4	9–9	7–0	5–3	5–13	2–3	3–4	1–7	4–2	–	6–12	3–3	3–4	6–9
San Francisco	9–9	1–6	4–5	2–5	13–5	2–4	3–4	9–9	3–3	4–2	3–4	3–3	12–6	–	5–2	3–4	10–5
St. Louis	4–3	5–1	10–5	6–9	4–2	6–2	10–5	3–4	9–9	3–3	6–3	9–7	3–3	2–5	–	2–4	8–7
Washington	3–5	9–9	4–3	2–4	3–4	7–11	3–3	2–4	3–3	10–8	10–8	4–4	4–3	4–3	4–2	–	8–7

== Roster ==
2011 Atlanta Braves
Roster
Pitchers: 56 Jairo Asencio; 37 Brandon Beachy; 40 Randall Delgado; 53 Cory Gearrin; 48 Tommy Hanson; 15 Tim Hudson; 49 Jair Jurrjens; 46 Craig Kimbrel; 19 Scott Linebrink; 32 Derek Lowe; 50 Cristhian Martínez; 54 Kris Medlen; 36 Mike Minor; 58 Peter Moylan; 34 Eric O'Flaherty; 43 Scott Proctor; 52 George Sherrill; 43,57 Julio Teherán; 38 Anthony Varvaro; 39 Jonny Venters; 59 Arodys Vizcaíno	Catchers: 27 J. C. Boscán; 16 Brian McCann; 8 David Ross; Infielders: 7 Brooks Conrad; 5 Freddie Freeman; 2 Álex González; 24 Diory Hernández; 23 Brandon Hicks; 10 Chipper Jones; 28 Julio Lugo; 26 Dan Uggla; 1 Jack Wilson	Outfielders: 24 Michael Bourn; 17 José Constanza; 23 Matt Diaz; 22 Jason Heyward; 20 Eric Hinske; 4 Joe Mather; 13 Nate McLouth; 14 Martín Prado; 30 Wilkin Ramírez; 4 Antoan Richardson; 1 Jordan Schafer; 17 Matt Young	Manager: 33 Fredi González; Coaches: 18 Carlos Tosca (bench); 9 Terry Pendleton (first base); 45 Roger McDowell (pitching); 25 Larry Parrish (hitting); 12 Eddie Pérez (bullpen); 51 Brian Snitker (third base)

== Player stats ==
Stats complete through September 28, 2011

* = Acquired mid-season

† = No longer with Braves

Name = Player qualifies for batting title (batters) or ERA title (pitchers)

=== Batting ===
Note: G = Games played; AB = At bats; R = Runs scored; H = Hits; AVG = Batting average; HR = Home runs; RBI = Runs batted in

Player	G	AB	R	H	AVG	HR	RBI
J. C. Boscan	4	9	0	3	.333	0	0
Michael Bourn*	53	227	30	63	.278	1	18
Brooks Conrad	92	103	11	23	.223	4	13
José Constanza	42	109	21	33	.303	2	10
Matt Diaz*	16	35	2	10	.286	0	1
Freddie Freeman	157	571	67	161	.282	21	76
Álex González	149	564	59	136	.241	15	56
Diory Hernandez	22	33	4	7	.212	1	4
Jason Heyward	128	396	50	90	.227	14	42
Brandon Hicks	17	21	1	1	.048	0	1
Eric Hinske	117	236	24	55	.233	10	28
Chipper Jones	126	455	56	125	.275	18	70
Julio Lugo	22	44	3	6	.136	0	3
Joe Mather	36	75	4	16	.213	1	9
Brian McCann	128	466	51	126	.270	24	71
Nate McLouth	81	267	35	61	.228	4	16
Martín Prado	129	551	66	143	.260	13	57
Wilkin Ramírez	20	26	5	6	.231	0	2
Antoan Richardson	9	4	2	2	.500	0	0
David Ross	52	152	14	40	.263	6	23
Jordan Schafer†	52	196	32	47	.240	1	7
Dan Uggla	161	600	88	140	.233	36	82
Jack Wilson*	17	41	3	9	.220	0	0
Matt Young	20	48	4	10	.208	0	1
Pitcher totals	162	299	9	32	.107	2	16
Team totals	162	5528	641	1345	.243	173	606

Complete batting stats can be found here.

=== Pitching ===
Note: G = Games pitched; IP = Innings pitched; W = Wins; L = Losses; ERA = Earned run average; SO= Strikeouts; WHIP = Walks and hits per inning pitched

==== Starting pitchers ====
Player	G	IP	W	L	ERA	SO	WHIP
Brandon Beachy	25	141.2	7	3	3.68	169	1.21
Randall Delgado	7	35.0	1	1	2.83	18	1.23
Tommy Hanson	22	130.0	11	7	3.60	142	1.17
Tim Hudson	33	215.0	16	10	3.22	158	1.14
Jair Jurrjens	23	152.0	13	6	2.96	90	1.22
Derek Lowe	34	187.0	9	17	5.05	137	1.51
Mike Minor	15	82.2	5	3	4.14	77	1.49
Julio Teherán	5	19.2	1	1	5.03	10	1.47

==== Relief pitchers ====
Note: G = Games pitched; W = Wins; L = Losses; L = Losses; SV = Saves; HLD = Holds; IP = Innings pitched; ERA = Earned run average; SO = Strikeouts; WHIP = Walks and hits per inning pitched

Player	G	W	L	SV	HLD	IP	ERA	SO	WHIP
Jairo Asencio	6	0	0	0	0	10.1	6.97	8	2.03
Cory Gearrin	18	1	1	0	3	18.1	7.85	25	1.58
Craig Kimbrel	79	4	3	46	0	77.0	2.10	127	1.04
Scott Linebrink	64	4	4	1	7	54.1	3.64	42	1.45
Cristhian Martínez	46	1	3	0	3	77.2	3.36	58	0.97
Kris Medlen	2	0	0	0	0	2.1	0.00	2	0.43
Peter Moylan	13	2	1	0	2	8.1	3.24	10	1.80
Eric O'Flaherty	78	2	4	0	32	42.0	0.98	67	1.09
Scott Proctor†	31	2	3	0	4	29.1	6.44	18	1.70
George Sherrill	51	3	1	0	7	36.0	3.00	38	1.25
Anthony Varvaro	18	0	2	0	1	24.0	2.63	23	1.08
Jonny Venters	85	6	2	5	35	88.0	1.84	96	1.09
Arodys Vizcaíno	17	1	1	0	5	17.1	4.67	17	1.44
Team Pitching Totals	162	89	73	52	99	1479.2	3.48	1332	1.25

Complete pitching stats can be found here.

== Farm system ==
Level	Team	League	Manager
AAA	Gwinnett Braves	International League	Dave Brundage
AA	Mississippi Braves	Southern League	Rocket Wheeler
A	Lynchburg Hillcats	Carolina League	Luis Salazar
A	Rome Braves	South Atlantic League	Matt Walbeck and Rick Albert
Rookie	Danville Braves	Appalachian League	Randy Ingle
Rookie	GCL Braves	Gulf Coast League	Jonathan Schuerholz
