= Brandon Beachy =

American baseball pitcher (born 1986)

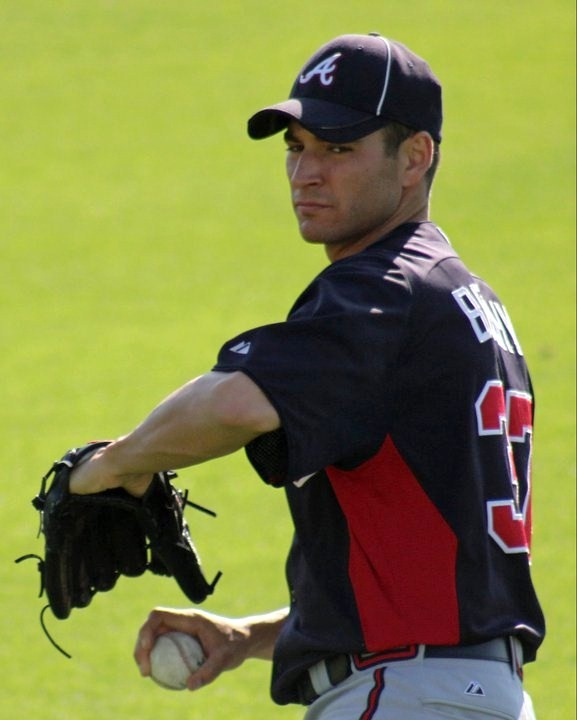
- Beachy with the Atlanta Braves
- Pitcher
- Born: September 3, 1986 (age 40); Kokomo, Indiana, U.S.
- Batted: Right Threw: Right

MLB debut
- September 20, 2010, for the Atlanta Braves

Last MLB appearance
- July 20, 2015, for the Los Angeles Dodgers

MLB statistics
- Win–loss record: 14–12
- Earned run average: 3.36
- Strikeouts: 280
- Stats at Baseball Reference

Teams
- Atlanta Braves (2010–2013); Los Angeles Dodgers (2015)

Brandon Alan Beachy (born September 3, 1986) is an American former professional baseball pitcher. He played in Major League Baseball (MLB) for the Atlanta Braves and Los Angeles Dodgers.

== Amateur career ==
Beachy attended Northwestern Senior High School in Kokomo, Indiana. He helped lead their team to lose Indiana's 2004–2005 class AA state championship game to the North Posey Vikings. After the game, he was presented with the Indiana High School Athletic Association Mental Attitude Award. After high school, he attended Indiana Wesleyan University, where he played third base, first base, and pitched for the Indiana Wesleyan Wildcats.

Beachy was not selected in the 2008 Major League Baseball draft following his junior year of college, but signed with the Atlanta Braves as an undrafted free agent on July 22, 2008.

== Career ==
=== Minor leagues ===
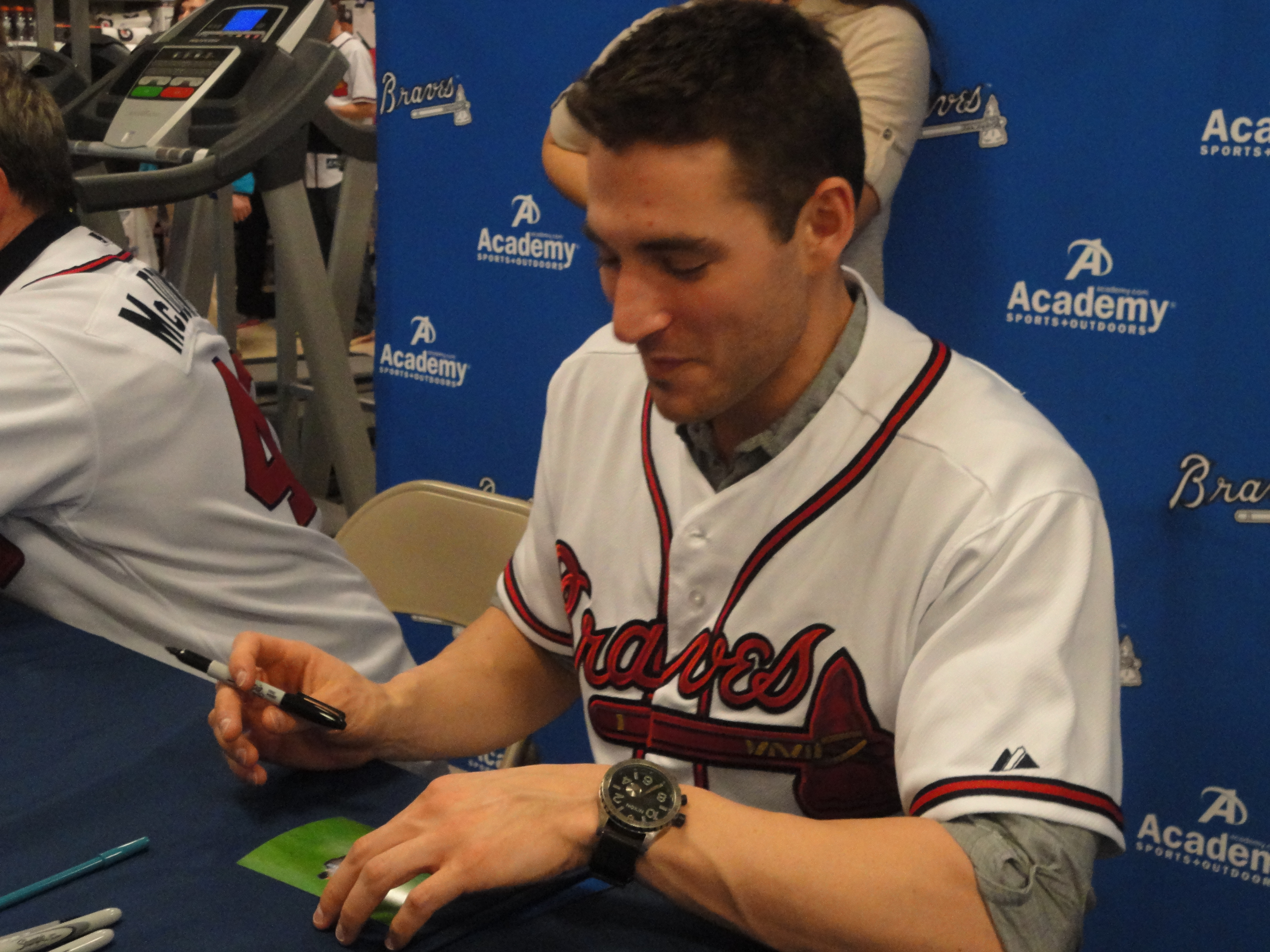
Beachy signing autographs in 2012

Beachy compiled a 4–3 record with one save and a 3.87 ERA in 76 2/3 innings of work spread over 35 appearances and three different teams in 2009. He struck out 64 batters and walked 19. Most of his time was spent with the Myrtle Beach Pelicans of the High-A Carolina League.

In spring 2010, Beachy was one of six pitchers who took part in a spring mini-camp in which some of the Braves’ top minor leaguers took turns serving as backups for major league players in spring training games. He was the youngest minor leaguer in the mini-camp.

Beachy was moved into the starting rotation for the Double-A Mississippi Braves late June 2010. In his time with Mississippi, he struck out 100 batters while allowing 53 hits and 22 walks in 27 games (73.2 innings) while maintaining a 1.47 ERA. He compiled a record of 3 wins and 1 loss. Opposing hitters hit .200 and produced 12 earned runs. Beachy's best performance of the season occurred on July 15 when he struck out 13 of 19 batters against the Huntsville Stars.

Beachy was promoted to the Triple-A Gwinnett Braves in the fall of 2010. While there, he delivered 2 wins with 0 losses and a 2.17 ERA.

=== Atlanta Braves ===
Beachy made his major league debut with the Braves as the starting pitcher against the Philadelphia Phillies on September 20, 2010, as a replacement for Jair Jurrjens who had injured his knee. Beachy pitched for 4 1/3 innings, gave up three runs (one earned), and received his first major league loss. He had two losses in three starts for the Braves in 2010, with an ERA of 3.00.

On March 24, 2011, the Braves announced that Beachy would be the club's fifth starter for the 2011 season. He was selected over Mike Minor for the final spot in Atlanta's rotation. In his fourth start of the season, he recorded his first major-league win by throwing six scoreless innings against the Los Angeles Dodgers in Dodger Stadium on April 19. During his first game back from an oblique injury, he set a new career high with 11 strikeouts in a game against the Toronto Blue Jays on June 22, 2011. He was 7–3 with a 3.68 ERA in 25 starts that season for the Braves.

Beachy got off to a strong start in 2012, and on May 17, 2012, he threw his first career shutout in a game against the Miami Marlins. He was placed on the disabled list on June 17 after suffering from elbow discomfort and on June 18, he was diagnosed with a partially torn ulnar collateral ligament in his right elbow. At the time, he led all starting pitchers in the major leagues with a 2.00 ERA. Beachy underwent Tommy John surgery on June 21, ending his 2012 season.

Beachy began the 2013 season on the 15-day disabled list, still recovering from the surgery and he returned to the Braves' starting rotation and made his season debut on July 29, 2013, in the place of Tim Hudson, who suffered a season-ending ankle fracture. He was 2–1 with a 4.50 ERA in five starts at the end of the season. However, Beachy was not on the Braves' postseason roster.

On December 16, 2013, Beachy agreed with the Braves on a one-year deal for the 2014 season. However, on March 20, it was reported that he would need a second Tommy John surgery and he did not pitch during the 2014 season. Beachy became a free agent on December 2, 2014, after he was non-tendered by the Braves.

=== Los Angeles Dodgers ===
On February 21, 2015, Beachy agreed to a one-year contract with the Los Angeles Dodgers, with a club option for 2016. He returned to the mound in a professional game for the first time since the surgery on June 16, 2015, when he threw 35 pitches for the Rancho Cucamonga Quakes in a California League game. He then pitched in several Triple-A games for the Oklahoma City Dodgers before he was called up to the majors on July 11. In his first start in two years, Beachy lasted four innings and gave up three runs on five hits. He made a second start on July 20, allowing four runs in five innings, and was then optioned back to Triple-A. He was designated for assignment on July 30. Beachy cleared waivers and was sent outright to Triple-A Oklahoma City Dodgers on August 3. He made 10 starts in Triple-A (and one relief appearance) and was 1–1 with a 3.64 ERA. He elected free agency on October 9.

On January 6, 2016, the Dodgers re-signed Beachy to a one-year, $1.5 million, major league contract. However, on January 27 he was removed from the 40-man roster and sent outright to Oklahoma City. Beachy was invited to major league spring training and emerged as an early favorite to win the fifth starter job to start the season. However, he struggled with his command in spring training action and was sidelined with elbow tendinitis that put him on the minor league disabled list to start the season. After initially thinking it was a minor issue, the tendinitis recurred when he tried to pitch again. and he left the Dodgers spring training complex to return home. He became a free agent following the season on October 13.

=== New Britain Bees ===
On August 14, 2018, after several years out of baseball, Beachy signed with the New Britain Bees of the independent Atlantic League of Professional Baseball. He became a free agent following the 2018 season. In 12 games (2 starts) 12.2 innings he went 0–1 with a 3.55 ERA and 12 strikeouts.

=== San Francisco Giants ===
On February 2, 2019, Beachy signed a minor league contract with the San Francisco Giants. He was released on July 26, 2019.

=== Long Island Ducks ===
On August 5, 2019, Beachy signed with the Long Island Ducks of the Atlantic League of Professional Baseball. He became a free agent following the season. In 9 games (7 starts) he threw 41 innings going 6–0 with a 2.85 ERA and 38 strikeouts. On April 6, 2020, Beachy re-signed with the Ducks for the upcoming season.

=== Sugar Land Skeeters ===
In July 2020, Beachy signed on to play for the Sugar Land Skeeters of the Constellation Energy League (a makeshift 4-team independent league created as a result of the COVID-19 pandemic) for the 2020 season.

== Pitching style ==
Beachy throws four pitches: a relatively straight four-seam fastball in the 90–94 mph range, a slider (80–84), a changeup (78–82), and a curveball (71–75). Beachy throws mostly fastballs and sliders to right-handed hitters, but he uses his changeup more frequently against left-handed hitters. He is especially fond of using his slider in two-strike counts.

== Personal life ==
Beachy's parents are Lester and Lori Beachy; he is the eldest of seven siblings.

He majored in pre-law and criminal justice and has worked at a center for delinquent children.
