= Jair Jurrjens =

Curaçaoan baseball player (born 1986)

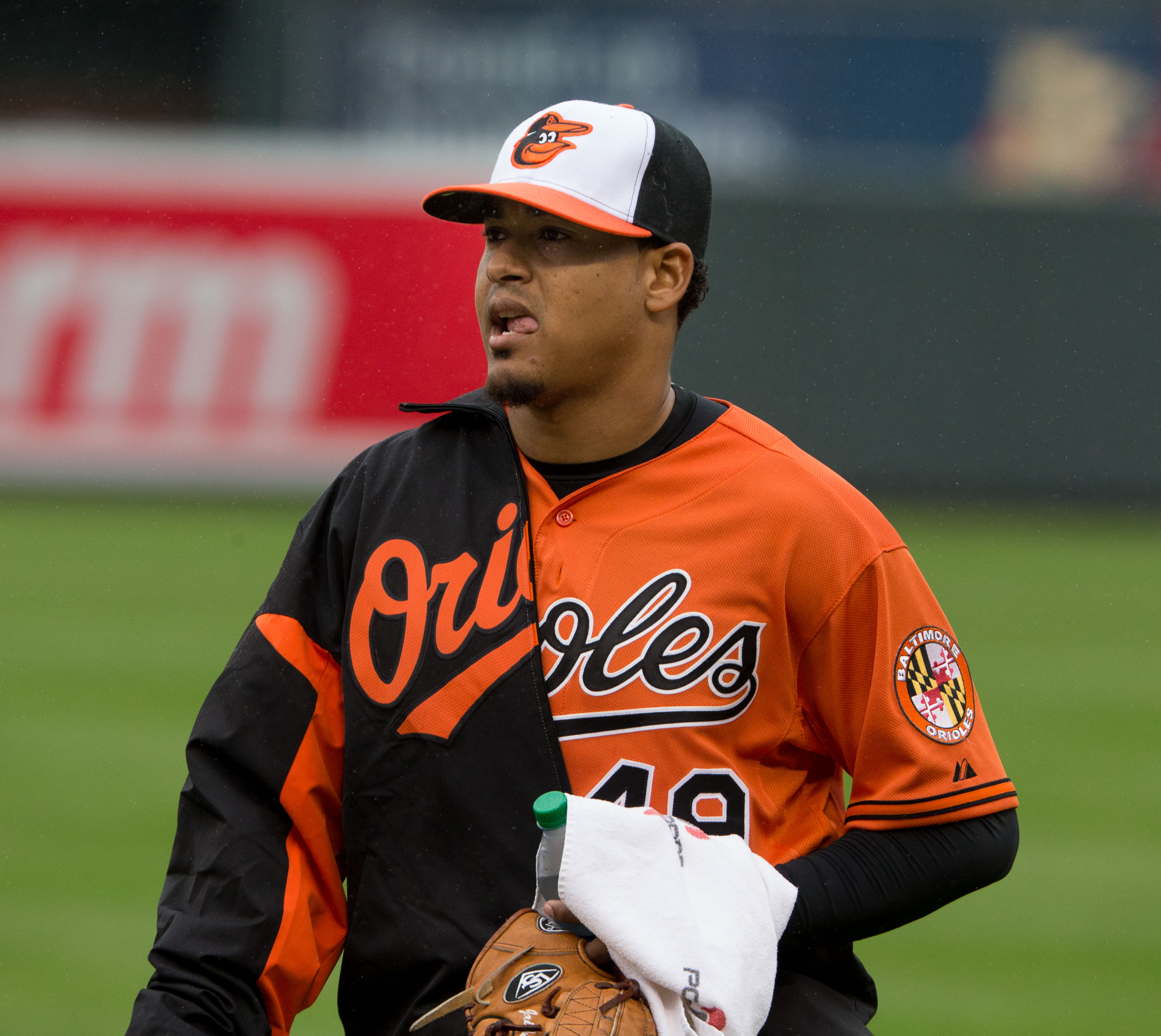
- Jurrjens with the Baltimore Orioles in 2013

Free agent
- Pitcher
- Born: January 29, 1986 (age 40); Willemstad, Curaçao
- Bats: Right Throws: Right

MLB debut
- August 15, 2007, for the Detroit Tigers

MLB statistics (through 2014 season)
- Win–loss record: 53–38
- Earned run average: 3.72
- Strikeouts: 514
- Stats at Baseball Reference

Teams
- Detroit Tigers (2007); Atlanta Braves (2008–2012); Baltimore Orioles (2013); Colorado Rockies (2014)

Career highlights and awards
- All-Star (2011)

Jair Francoise Jurrjens (/ˈdʒaɪ.ər ˈdʒɜːrdʒənz/ JY-ər JUR-jənz; born January 29, 1986) is a Dutch-Curaçaoan professional baseball pitcher who is a free agent. He has previously played in Major League Baseball (MLB) for the Detroit Tigers, Atlanta Braves (with whom he was an All-Star in 2011), Baltimore Orioles, and Colorado Rockies. He then pitched in the Chinese Professional Baseball League, American minor league and independent leagues, and the Mexican League. He pitched for the Netherlands in international competition, including three World Baseball Classic tournaments.

== Early life ==
Jurrjens was named after the Biblical judge Jair by his mother . He has two older siblings.

In 2002, Jurrjens was on the Curaçao Senior League team won the Senior League World Series in Bangor, Maine.

Jurrjens speaks English, Spanish, Dutch, and Papiamentu.

== Professional career ==
=== Detroit Tigers ===
Jurrjens was signed as an international free agent by the Detroit Tigers in 2003. In seven games during his 2003 campaign with the rookie-level Gulf Coast League Tigers, Jurrjens accumulated a 2–1 record with 20 strikeouts and just three walks.

Jurrjens broke out during his 2005 season with the West Michigan Whitecaps, the Tigers' Single-A affiliate. In 26 games started, Jurrjens went 12–6 with 108 strikeouts and 36 walks. He was a mid-season Midwest League All Star. He continued to improve during the 2006 season, beginning with a 5–0, 2.08 ERA start with the Lakeland Tigers that resulted in him being named to the Florida State League mid-season All Star team. Jurrjens was promoted to the Erie SeaWolves, the Tigers' Double-A affiliate. In 12 games with the SeaWolves, Jurrjens went 4–3 with a 3.36 ERA.

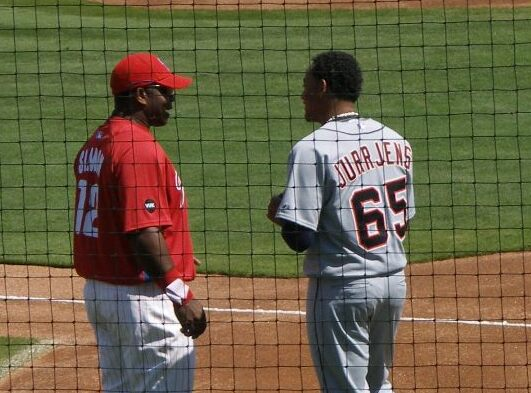
Jurrjens (right) talking to fellow Curaçaoan Randall Simon (left) in spring training in 2007

Entering 2007, Jurrjens was the Tigers' fourth-best prospect, according to Baseball America. He began the season pitching for the SeaWolves. On August 6, he was named Pitcher of the Week. On August 15, the Tigers purchased Jurrjens's contract from the SeaWolves, adding him to their 40-man roster. Jurrjens said he had three consecutive good starts, which led manager Jim Leyland to call him up. Jurrjens was at a Circuit City when he found out he was going to the majors.

Jurrjens made his major league debut on August 15, 2007, starting against the Cleveland Indians, making him the first pitcher from Curaçao to reach the major leagues. In that game, he gave up four earned runs in seven innings, taking the loss. He recorded his first major league win in his next start, also against Cleveland, allowing only one run on one hit in 6 2/3 innings pitched.

=== Atlanta Braves ===
On October 29, 2007, Jurrjens and outfielder Gorkys Hernández were traded to the Atlanta Braves for shortstop Édgar Rentería. Jurrjens was listed by Baseball America as the Braves' third-best prospect entering the 2008 season.

By the end of April 2008, Jurrjens was 3–2 with a 3.05 ERA and 28 strikeouts. Jurrjens was asked prior to the game on April 20 about how he felt facing his fellow countryman Andruw Jones. Jurrjens said, "It's going to be fun to face him", then added, "It's going to be even more fun to strike him out." Jurrjens then struck Jones out all three times he faced him.

Jurrjens pitched well throughout the first half of the 2008 season, compiling a 9–4 record with an impressive 3.00 ERA prior to the All-Star Break. On July 9, Jurrjens was named National League (NL) Rookie of the Month for June. He appeared to tire during the second half of the season, going 4–6 with a subpar 4.66 ERA after the All-Star Break. Overall, Jurrjens finished his rookie season with a record of 13–10 and a 3.68 ERA in 188 1/3 innings.

Jurrjens finished third in voting for the NL Rookie of the Year award, finishing behind winner Geovany Soto, with Joey Votto finishing second. Despite his impressive rookie season, some remained skeptical of Jurrjens's future prospects as a pitcher in the major leagues. As a result, Jurrjens went into the 2009 season looking to avoid a "sophomore slump."

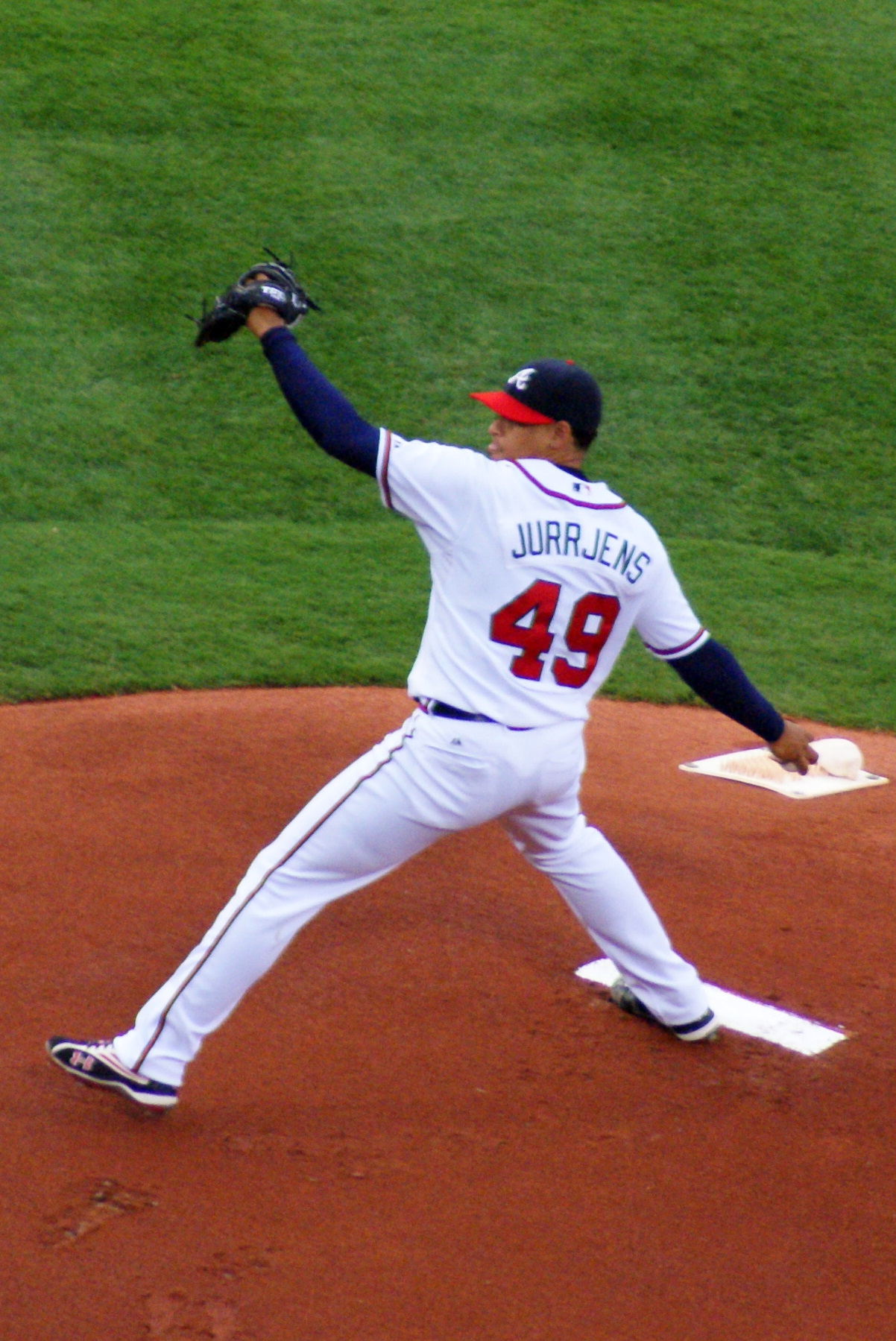
Jurrjens pitching for the Atlanta Braves in 2009

Jurrjens again pitched very well in the first half of 2009, going just 7–7 but posting an excellent 2.91 ERA in 19 starts. Unlike 2008, there was no drop-off in the second half for Jurrjens, as he went 7–3 with an exceptional 2.24 ERA in 15 second-half starts. He was named the NL Pitcher of the Month in September. Overall in 2009, Jurrjens went 14–10 while finishing third in the NL with a 2.60 ERA in 215 innings and tying for the league lead with 34 games started. Jurrjens went 7–6 with a 4.64 ERA in 2010, a season in which he dealt with some health problems. He underwent arthroscopic surgery for a torn meniscus in his right knee in October, having missed September and the NL Division Series with pain in his knee.

Jurrjens began the 2011 season on the disabled list (DL), but got off to a strong start after he was activated. He was named the NL Pitcher of the Month in May. He pitched his first career shutout on July 1, 2011, against the Baltimore Orioles, allowing one hit and one walk. It was his eleventh win of the season and improved his ERA to a league-best 1.89 ERA. Jurrjens led the NL in wins and ERA at the All-Star break, and was chosen to pitch in his only All-Star Game. He tossed 1 2/3 scoreless innings in the NL's 5–1 win. Following the All-Star break, Jurrjens went 0–1 with a 6.26 ERA in four starts. On August 6, the Braves placed him on the 15-day DL due to pain in his surgically repaired right knee. The move was retroactive to August 2. He returned briefly, but did not play for the Braves in September.

Jurrjens got off to a poor start in the 2012 season, while suffering from a strained groin, with an 0–2 record and a 9.37 ERA in his first four starts. On April 23, he was optioned to the Braves' Triple-A affiliate in Gwinnett, his first demotion in five seasons with the Braves. Atlanta general manager Frank Wren stated that the move was intended to give Jurrjens the opportunity to work through his difficulties at the Triple-A level and get back on track pitching wise. On June 22, Jurrjens was called back to the majors by the Braves after pitcher Brandon Beachy underwent Tommy John surgery. Jurrjens got his first win of the season against the Boston Red Sox. In 2012, he posted a 6.89 ERA. He was not tendered a contract before the deadline on November 30, and became a free agent.

=== Baltimore Orioles ===
On January 24, 2013, Jurrjens agreed to a one-year deal with the Baltimore Orioles for $1.5 million. Incentives could have brought the contract to $4 million. However, after the team reviewed Jurrjens's medical information, they instead signed Jurrjens to a minor league contract. The Orioles purchased Jurrjens's contract from Triple-A Norfolk Tides on May 18. He made his first start with Baltimore that day, pitching 5 innings and not receiving a decision in an Orioles loss. He was optioned back to Norfolk on May 21, then recalled on June 29. He was optioned back to Norfolk on July 1. Jurrjens was designated for assignment by the Orioles on July 12 to clear room for pitchers Jairo Asencio. Jurrjens opted for free agency instead of playing in Triple-A, and became a free agent on July 18.

=== Detroit Tigers (second stint) ===
On July 24, 2013, Jurrjens signed a minor league contract with the Detroit Tigers, and was subsequently assigned to the Triple-A Toledo Mud Hens. In 7 starts for Toledo, Jurrjens logged a 1–4 record and 5.49 ERA with 24 strikeouts across 39 1/3 innings pitched.

=== Cincinnati Reds ===
On May 20, 2014, Jurrjens signed a minor league deal with the Cincinnati Reds. He made 6 starts for the Triple-A Louisville Bats and was 2–3 with a 4.46 ERA and 27 strikeouts.

=== Colorado Rockies ===
On July 2, 2014, Jurrjens was traded to the Colorado Rockies for minor league first baseman Harold Riggins. Jurrjens made his 2014 major league debut on July 4, his first MLB start since June 29, 2013, pitching 4 2/3 innings and allowing eight runs on 12 hits. After the start, Jurrjens was taken to the hospital, though his "breathing problem" had since ceased. He said "It was super scary. Every time I needed to take a deep breath, I couldn't do it." Rockies manager Walt Weiss said the altitude may have affected Jurrjens in his first appearance.

Jurrjens was designated for assignment on July 21 and was re-signed to a minor league contract. In 2014, he was 0–1 with a 10.61 ERA for the Rockies in two starts and 0–5 with a 4.60 ERA for the Triple-A Colorado Springs Sky Sox in eight starts.

Jurrjens elected free agency in October 2014, but was re-signed by the Rockies to a minor league deal and began 2015 with the Rockies' new Triple-A affiliate, the Albuquerque Isotopes. He was released by the Rockies on August 28, after posting a 2–5 record and a 6.88 ERA in 17 games for the Isotopes.

=== Uni-President 7-Eleven Lions ===
Jurrjens signed with the Uni-President 7-Eleven Lions of the Chinese Professional Baseball League on February 13, 2016. He was on the disabled list twice, once with a groin injury, and was 6–7 with a 5.38 ERA. He was released on August 1.

=== Los Angeles Dodgers ===
On March 29, 2017, Jurrjens signed a minor league contract with the Los Angeles Dodgers and was assigned to the Triple-A Oklahoma City Dodgers to begin the season. He appeared in 11 games (10 starts) for Oklahoma City and was 4–3 with a 4.64 ERA. On June 15, he was suspended 80 games for testing positive for exogenous testosterone. On November 6, he elected free agency.

Jurrjens pitched for Tigres Del Licey in the Dominican Winter League during the 2017–18 season.

=== Long Island Ducks ===
On March 7, 2018, Jurrjens signed with the Long Island Ducks of the independent Atlantic League of Professional Baseball. In 9 appearances for the Ducks, Jurrjens logged a 3–3 record and 3.55 ERA with 32 strikeouts in 50 2/3 innings of work. He became a free agent following the 2018 season.

=== Guerreros de Oaxaca ===
On December 20, 2019, Jurrjens signed with the Algodoneros de Unión Laguna of the Mexican League for the 2020 season. Jurrjens did not play in a game in 2020 due to the cancellation of the Mexican League season because of the COVID-19 pandemic. He later became a free agent.

On June 7, 2021, Jurrjens signed with the Guerreros de Oaxaca of the Mexican League. He made 7 starts, going 3–1 with a 4.26 ERA and 25 strikeouts in 38 innings. Jurrjens became a free agent following the season.

=== Acereros de Monclova ===
On May 17, 2022, Jurrjens signed with the Saraperos de Saltillo of the Mexican League. However, he was released on May 25, without pitching in a game for the team. On July 1, Jurrjens signed with the Acereros de Monclova of the Mexican League. He made one scoreless appearance for Monclova and became a free agent following the season.

=== Olmecas de Tabasco ===
On May 4, 2024, Jurrjens signed with the Olmecas de Tabasco of the Mexican League. He made one start for Tabasco, allowing four runs on four walks and one hit across 1 1/3 innings. Jurrjens was released by the Olmecas on May 7.

=== Lincoln Saltdogs ===
On April 16, 2025, Jurrjens signed with the Lincoln Saltdogs of the American Association of Professional Baseball. He made one start for Lincoln, taking the loss after allowing eight runs on seven hits with two strikeouts across 1 2/3 innings pitched. Jurrjens was released by the Saltdogs on May 13.

== International career ==
Jurrjens pitched for the Netherlands national team in the 2006 World Baseball Classic (WBC). He pitched one inning against Puerto Rico in the WBC, giving up three runs and earning him a loss.

Jurrjens pitched for the Netherlands in the 2017 WBC, with a 1–0 record, 2.38 ERA and 9 strikeouts in a team-leading 11 1/3 innings in three games. He was named to a preliminary roster for the 2023 WBC but was not on the final roster and did not pitch in the tournament. He also pitched for the Netherlands in the WBSC Premier12 tournament in 2015 and 2019 and the qualifying tournament for the 2020 Olympics.

== Coaching career ==
Jurrjens was a coach for the Netherlands in the 2023 European championship and 2026 WBC.

== Pitching repertoire ==
Jurrjens has a four-seam fastball that averaged 90.7 mph (146.0 km/h) during his time in MLB. He also threw a sinker, changeup, and slider. As a prospect, he was known for his effortless pitching delivery.
