= Anthony Varvaro =

American baseball player (1984–2022)

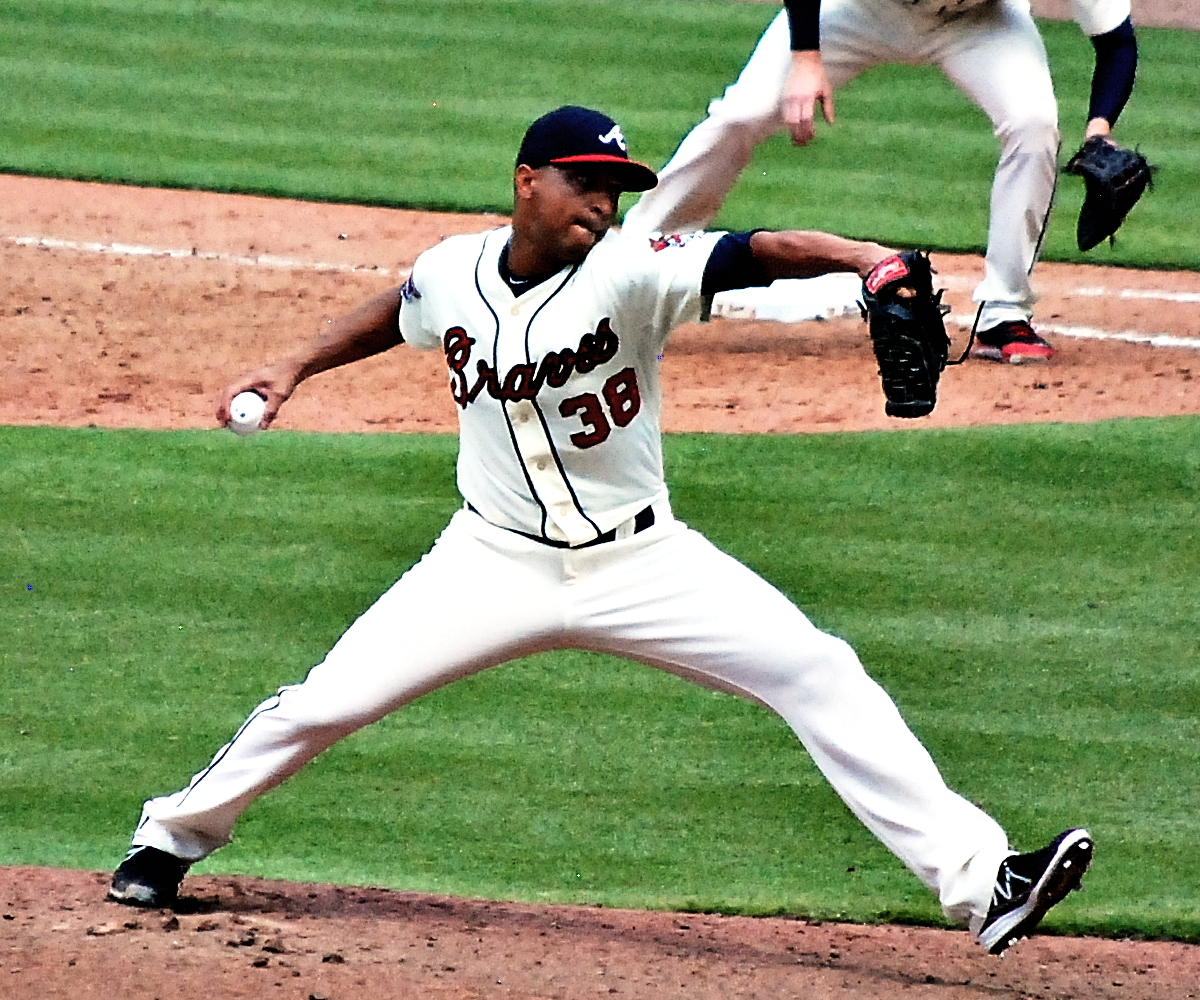
- Varvaro with the Atlanta Braves in 2014
- Pitcher
- Born: October 31, 1984; Staten Island, New York, U.S.
- Died: September 11, 2022 (aged 37); Jersey City, New Jersey, U.S.
- Batted: Right Threw: Right

MLB debut
- September 24, 2010, for the Seattle Mariners

Last MLB appearance
- April 28, 2015, for the Boston Red Sox

MLB statistics
- Win–loss record: 7–9
- Earned run average: 3.23
- Strikeouts: 150
- Stats at Baseball Reference

Teams
- Seattle Mariners (2010); Atlanta Braves (2011–2014); Boston Red Sox (2015)

Anthony Michael Varvaro (October 31, 1984 – September 11, 2022) was an American professional baseball pitcher. He played in Major League Baseball (MLB) for the Seattle Mariners, Atlanta Braves, and Boston Red Sox from 2010 to 2015. After Varvaro's baseball career, he became a police officer with the Port Authority of New York and New Jersey.

== Amateur career ==
Varvaro was from the West Brighton neighborhood of Staten Island, a borough of New York City, and played in Little League Baseball in West Shore. He attended Curtis High School in Staten Island and played for the school's baseball team. He graduated in June 2002.

Varvaro attended St. John's University, where he played college baseball for the St. John's Red Storm. In 2004, his junior year, he had a 9–3 win–loss record and a 2.32 earned run average (ERA) while recording 115 strikeouts in 85 innings pitched. He played collegiate summer baseball with the Harwich Mariners of the Cape Cod Baseball League after the season. In 2015, he underwent Tommy John surgery. Varvaro graduated with a bachelor's degree in criminal justice.

== Professional baseball career ==
=== Seattle Mariners ===
The Seattle Mariners selected Varvaro in the 12th round of the 2005 MLB draft. He appeared in five games with the Peoria Mariners in 2006, his first professional season. In 2007, Varvaro played for the Single-A Wisconsin Timber Rattlers, making 22 appearances, and 21 starts. He led the Timber Rattlers with 112 strikeouts.

Varvaro spent the 2008 season with the Class-A High Desert Mavericks, appearing in 30 games, 24 of them starts. In 2009, Varvaro split the season with the Mavericks and the Double-A West Tenn Diamond Jaxx. He made it to the Southern League All-Star Team. Varvaro participated in the Arizona Fall League playing for the Peoria Javelinas. He was placed on the Mariners' 40-man roster on November 20.

Varvaro began the 2010 season with the Diamond Jaxx, and after playing in the Southern League's all-star game, the Mariners promoted him to the Tacoma Rainiers of the Class AAA Pacific Coast League. On September 22, 2010, the Mariners promoted Varvaro along with four others following the conclusion of Tacoma's season.

=== Atlanta Braves ===
On January 13, 2011, the Atlanta Braves claimed Varvaro off waivers. He began the 2011 season with the Gwinnett Braves of the Triple-A International League and was promoted to the major leagues in July 2011 to make a few appearances out of the bullpen before being returned to Gwinnett. He was recalled on September 1, 2011. Varvaro compiled a 2.74 ERA in the 123 appearances he made from 2013–14, as he pitched in varied situations, from long relief to right-handed specialist roles. He was designated for assignment on December 15, 2014. In four years for Atlanta, he pitched to a 2.99 ERA.

=== Boston Red Sox ===
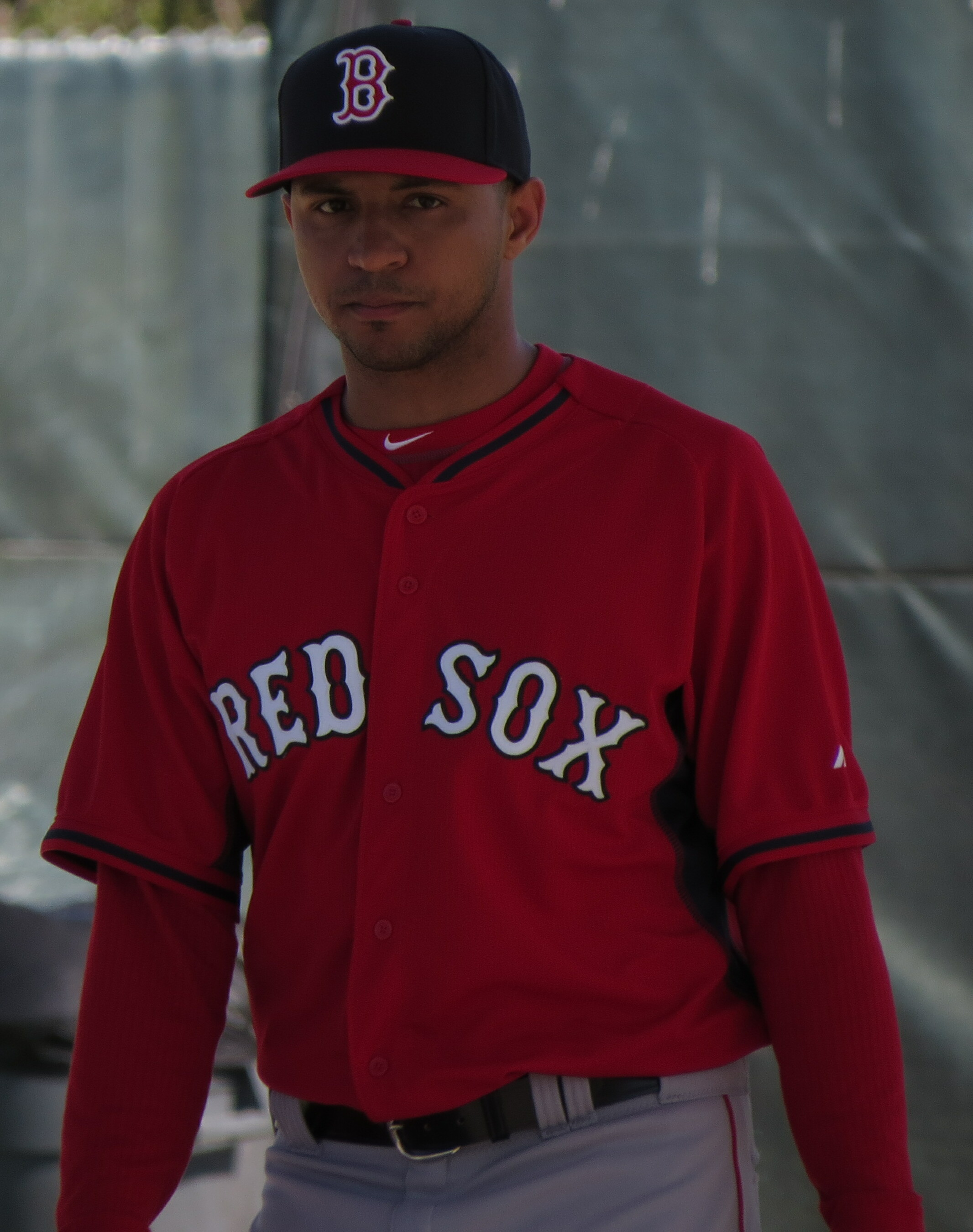
Varvaro with the Red Sox

On December 17, 2014, Varvaro was traded to the Boston Red Sox in exchange for minor leaguer Aaron Kurcz. He allowed five runs in 11 innings for the Red Sox and was designated for assignment by the Red Sox on April 29, 2015. He then was claimed off waivers by the Chicago Cubs on May 3. However, the Cubs discovered a torn flexor tendon in his pitching arm. As a result, Varvaro was returned to the Red Sox and required season-ending surgery, being subsequently placed on the disabled list on May 24. He was released after the 2015 season.

After recovering, the Red Sox announced they had signed him to a minor league contract on December 15. In 2016, Varvaro was assigned to Triple-A Pawtucket Red Sox. He posted a 3–2 record with a 2.83 ERA and one save in 18 relief appearances, striking out 31 batters while walking 13 in 28 2/3 innings of work.

== Police career ==
Varvaro retired from baseball in June 2016 to begin police training with the Port Authority of New York and New Jersey. He became a Port Authority police officer in December 2016. He was assigned to the World Trade Center Command. After five years, he was transferred to the Port Authority's police academy to become an instructor.

== Personal life ==
Varvaro married Kerry Thomson in 2011. They had four children. He was a member of the Staten Island Sports Hall of Fame's Class of 2019.

Varvaro died in a head-on collision with a wrong-way driver in Jersey City, New Jersey, a short distance from the Holland Tunnel, early on September 11, 2022. He was on his way to serve at the World Trade Center Command in commemoration of the September 11 attacks when the accident happened. He was 37.
