= Jonny Venters =

American baseball player (born 1985)

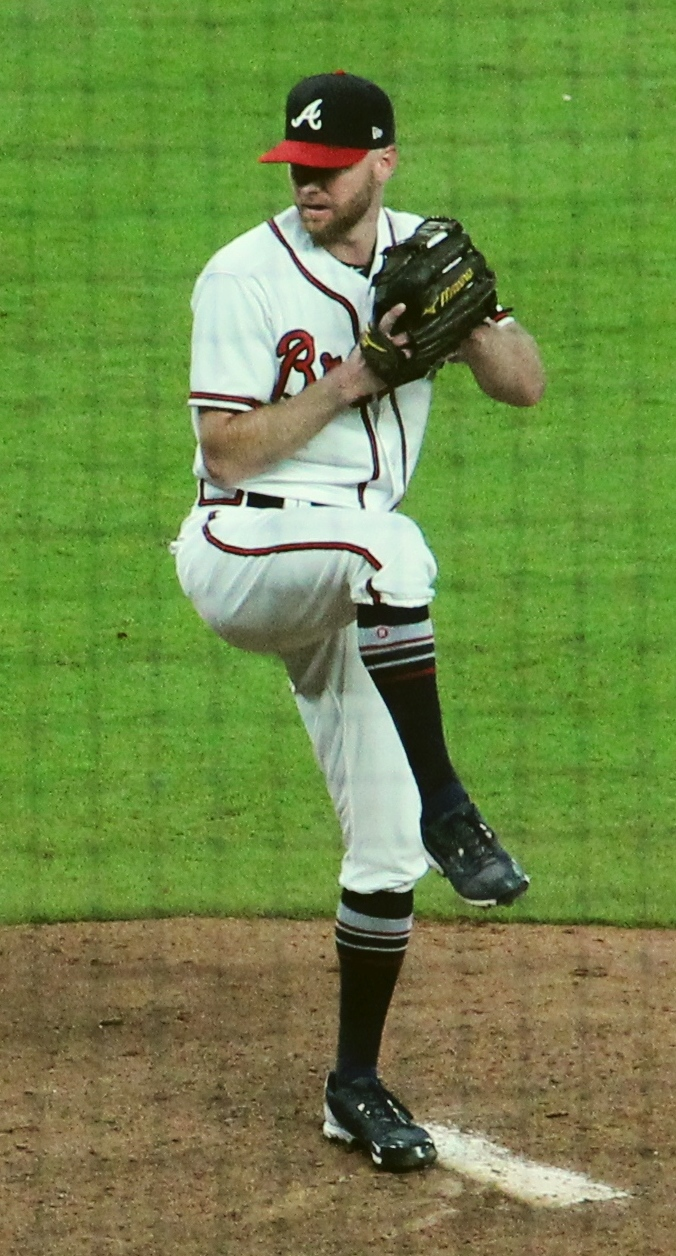
- Venters with the Atlanta Braves in 2018
- Pitcher
- Born: March 20, 1985 (age 41); Pikeville, Kentucky, U.S.
- Batted: Left Threw: Left

MLB debut
- April 17, 2010, for the Atlanta Braves

Last MLB appearance
- July 5, 2019, for the Washington Nationals

MLB statistics
- Win–loss record: 20–13
- Earned run average: 2.71
- Strikeouts: 297
- Stats at Baseball Reference

Teams
- Atlanta Braves (2010–2012); Tampa Bay Rays (2018); Atlanta Braves (2018–2019); Washington Nationals (2019)

Career highlights and awards
- All-Star (2011); NL Comeback Player of the Year (2018)

Jonathan William Venters (born March 20, 1985) is an American former professional baseball relief pitcher. He played in Major League Baseball (MLB) for the Atlanta Braves, Tampa Bay Rays and Washington Nationals.

== Career ==
=== Atlanta Braves ===
==== Minor leagues ====
Venters was drafted by the Atlanta Braves in the 30th round of the 2003 Major League Baseball draft out of Lake Brantley High School. He began his professional career with the Rookie League GCL Braves in 2004. During the 2004 season, Venters started 8 games and made 11 appearances total, going 1–6 with a 5.74 ERA and 3 saves. In 2005, Venters was promoted to the Single-A Rome Braves. In 23 games (12 starts), Venters had an 8–6 record and a 3.93 ERA. After undergoing Tommy John surgery in late 2005, Venters missed the entire 2006 season.

In 2007, Venters was promoted to the High-A Myrtle Beach Pelicans. He appeared in 17 games (12 starts), going 3–3 with a 3.39 ERA and 1 save. Venters was demoted all the way down to the Rookie League level to begin the 2008 season where he posted a 4.70 ERA in 4 starts. He was promoted to High–A, where he went 1–2 with a 4.08 ERA in 5 games (3 starts). He was then promoted to the Double-A Mississippi Braves, where he finished the season by going 1–0 with a 1.00 ERA in 3 games (2 starts). All together in the 2008 campaign, Venters posted a 3.41 ERA, 1 save, and a 2–2 record in 12 total games combined with the three affiliate levels. Venters started the 2009 season in Double-A, posting a 4–4 record in 12 starts with a 2.76 ERA. He was promoted to the Triple-A Gwinnett Braves, where he finished 4–7 with a 5.62 ERA in 17 starts. Combined with both Minor League levels in 2009, Venters went 8–11 in 29 total starts with a 4.42 combined ERA.

After the 2009 season, the Braves added Venters to their 40-man roster with an invitation to spring training. After spring training, Venters started the 2010 season in Triple-A. After 2 games (1 start), Venters went 1–0 with a 1.35 ERA until being called up to the Majors.

==== Major leagues ====
The Braves promoted Venters the major leagues for the first time on April 17, 2010. He made his debut that day against the Colorado Rockies, allowing one hit and no runs over three innings.

On July 17, 2010, in a game against the Milwaukee Brewers, Venters was deemed to have intentionally thrown at Brewers first baseman Prince Fielder. He was ejected from the game along with Braves manager Bobby Cox and later suspended four games, a decision which Venters later appealed. Venters' suspension was subsequently overturned.

Venters finished the season with a 1.95 ERA, and ranked sixth in the National League, with 79 games pitched. He was named a relief pitcher on Baseball America's 2010 All-Rookie Team. He tied for 8th in the voting for NL Rookie of the Year, behind Ike Davis of the New York Mets.

Venters became a key part of the Braves bullpen during the 2011 season, serving primarily as the set up man for Craig Kimbrel. Along with Kimbrel and Eric O'Flaherty, the three pitchers became known as O'Ventbrel for their dominance over the last three innings of a ballgame. Venters was voted a National League All-Star in 2011, striking out Jacoby Ellsbury as part of a successful two-out effort in the top of the eighth inning. Venters recorded a career-low 1.84 ERA in 2011 and led all pitchers with 85 games played.

Venters struggled throughout the first half of the 2012 season. During a game against the New York Yankees on June 12, 2012, he allowed Alex Rodriguez's 23rd career grand slam. He was placed on the disabled list on July 5, 2012, due to a sore left elbow. He returned to the bullpen on July 22, 2012, where he pitched two scoreless innings versus the Washington Nationals. Venters finished the 2012 season with a 5–4 record and a 3.32 ERA.

Venters opened the 2013 season on the disabled list with left elbow discomfort. Trying to avoid surgery, he was injected with platelet-rich plasma, but he still was not expected to return until at least late May. However, the procedure was unsuccessful, and on May 16, 2013, Venters underwent Tommy John surgery for the second time of his career. This naturally eliminated the remainder of his 2013 season. Venters was placed on the 60-day disabled list on July 4, 2013, to free up a spot on the Braves' 40-man roster as Joey Terdoslavich was promoted from Triple–A Gwinnett to replace Jordan Schafer on the active roster.

After the season, Venters signed a one-year deal with the Braves for the 2014 season, thereby avoiding arbitration. Venters began the 2014 season on the 60-day disabled list while recovering from surgery, enduring many setbacks in the process. On August 28, 2014, Venters learned he had torn his ulnar collateral ligament again and would need a third Tommy John surgery to continue his baseball career. The third procedure was performed in September 2014, and prevented Venters from pitching in 2015.

On November 19, 2014, the Braves designated Venters for assignment. He was released two days later.

=== Tampa Bay Rays ===
On March 11, 2015, Venters signed a two-year minor league contract with the Tampa Bay Rays. He did not make an appearance in 2015 as he was still recovering from his third Tommy John surgery. On July 2, 2016, Venters tore his ulnar collateral ligament once again, but due to the way it was torn, he went through a ligament reattachment instead of going through what would have been his fourth Tommy John surgery. He elected free agency following the season on November 7.

Venters signed a minor league deal on March 30, 2017. He once again began the season on the 60-day disabled list and did not make any appearances in the Majors in 2017. He elected free agency on November 6, 2017. In December 2017, Venters rejoined the Rays and was invited to spring training in 2018.

On April 25, 2018, the Rays recalled Venters from the Triple–A Durham Bulls, approximately 2,027 days since his last big league appearance. The same day, Venters finally made his way back into the Majors, pitching against the Baltimore Orioles and getting Chris Davis to ground out on four pitches.

=== Atlanta Braves (second stint) ===
On July 26, 2018, the Rays traded Venters to the Braves in exchange for an international signing bonus slot. Venters finished the 2018 season with a 5–2 record, a 3.67 ERA, and three saves in fifty games pitched all season. At the end of the 2018 season, Venters received the National League Comeback Player of the Year Award. He agreed to a one-year contract worth $2.25 million for the 2019 season. He was released on May 18, 2019.

=== Washington Nationals ===
On May 29, 2019, Venters signed a minor league deal with the Washington Nationals. His contract was selected on June 25, 2019, and he was called up to the major leagues. Venters made 3 appearances for the Nationals, complying with a 0–1 record and a 5.40 ERA. On August 30, 2019, Venters underwent left shoulder surgery to repair a torn capsule, therefore ending his season. Overall in 2019, combined with both teams he played for, his ERA was 12.38 with 12 relief appearances. At the time of his absence, the Nationals finished the year with a 93–69 record, clinching a wild card spot, and eventually winning the 2019 World Series over the Astros. He became a free agent following the season.

== Personal life ==
Venters married Viviana, whom he began dating in high school, in 2008. The couple has three children.

== Pitching style ==
Venters primarily throws a sinker, which he throws with exceptional velocity (93–96 mph). He used that sinker to achieve a near-70% ground ball rate in 2010, leading all qualified MLB pitchers. His superb knuckle curve is thrown at 85–88 mph. In 2011, it resulted in an extraordinary whiff rate of 71% (the highest for any pitch by any relief pitcher) and was put in play less than 6% of the time. He also has a four-seam fastball in the mid 90s and a changeup in the upper 80s that he began throwing somewhat frequently in 2012 against right-handed hitters.
