= José Constanza =

Dominican baseball player (born 1983)

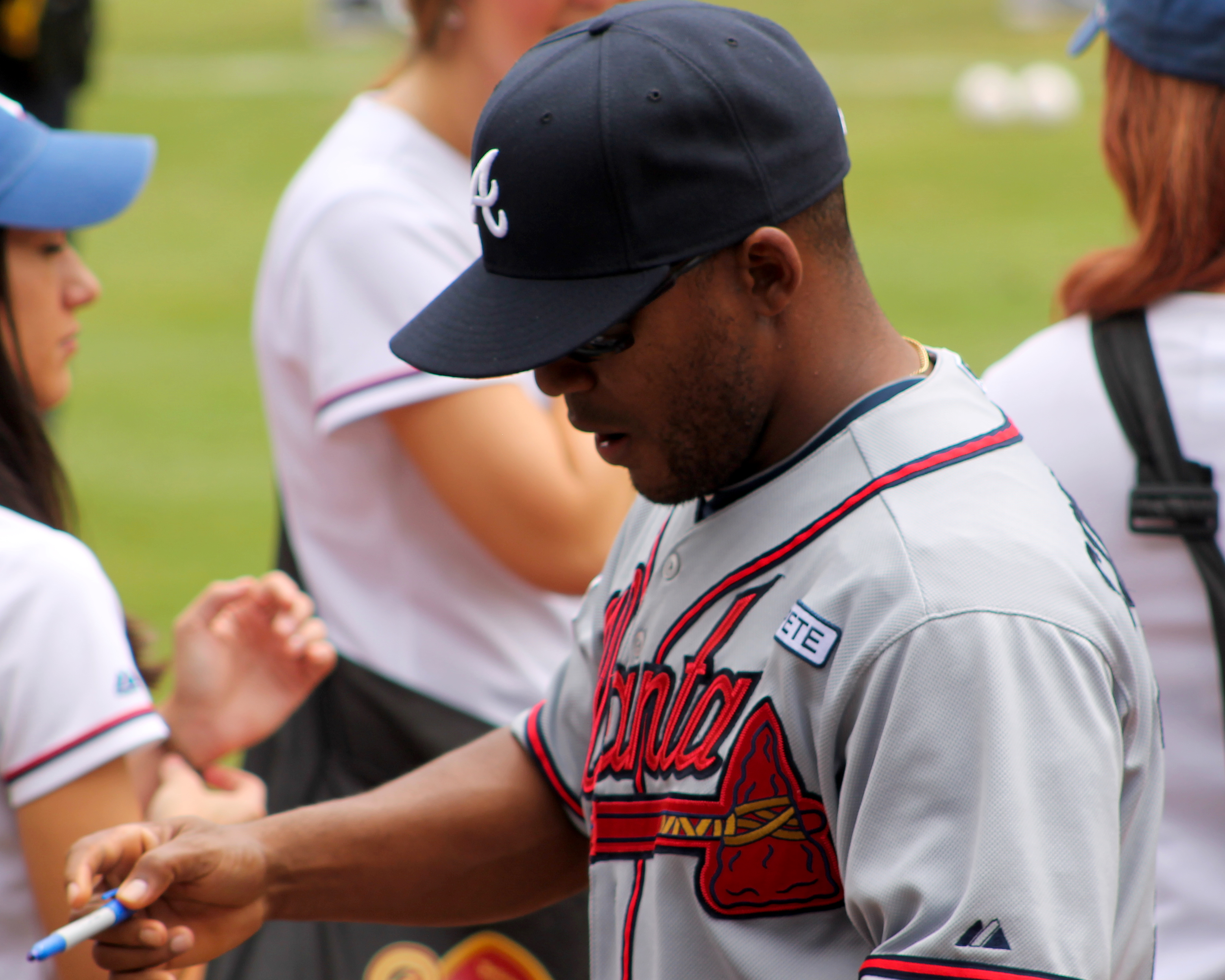
- Constanza with the Atlanta Braves
- Outfielder
- Born: September 1, 1983 (age 42); Santo Domingo, Dominican Republic
- Batted: Left Threw: Left

MLB debut
- July 29, 2011, for the Atlanta Braves

Last MLB appearance
- September 26, 2014, for the Atlanta Braves

MLB statistics
- Batting average: .273
- Home runs: 2
- Runs batted in: 17
- Stats at Baseball Reference

Teams
- Atlanta Braves (2011–2014)

José G. Constanza (born September 1, 1983) is a Dominican former professional baseball outfielder. He played in Major League Baseball (MLB) for the Atlanta Braves.

== Baseball career ==
=== Cleveland Indians ===
Constanza was signed as a non-drafted free agent by the Cleveland Indians on June 13, 2003. After two years and one 2004 League MVP in the Dominican Summer League, he came to America in 2005 with the Single-A Lake County Captains. After batting only .236 in 26 games, he was demoted to Short-Season Mahoning Valley. He started the 2006 season with Lake County and with a .395 On-base percentage, earned a promotion to A-Advanced Kinston. He spent 2007 with Kinston, and 2008, as well as 2009, with the Double-A Akron Aeros. In what proved to be his last season in the Indians organization, he reached the highest level, Triple-A, with the Columbus Clippers.

=== Atlanta Braves ===
On November 22, 2010, Constanza signed a minor league contract with the Atlanta Braves. He made spring training with the club, batting .222 before being assigned to the Triple-A Gwinnett Braves. He was batting .312 and was an All-Star before his first call-up.

On July 29, 2011, Constanza was called up to the majors when Nate McLouth was placed on the 15-day disabled list with a lower abdominal strain. Placed in the leadoff spot in the Braves' lineup in his debut game, he got his first career hit in the bottom of the eighth inning off Florida Marlins pitcher (and former Braves pitcher) Mike Dunn, an RBI single that extended the Braves' lead to 4–0. Two batters later, Braves first-baseman Freddie Freeman hit a sacrifice fly to drive in Constanza, netting him his first career run scored. On Sunday, August 7, 2011, Constanza hit his first home run in the top of the 5th inning against the New York Mets. He was subsequently recognized for his odd habit of licking the hot spot of the bat after foul-tipping the ball.

Constanza was called up once again on July 13, 2013, due to many injuries to the Braves' regular outfielders. Constanza was designated for assignment on January 28, 2015.

=== Cincinnati Reds ===
He was signed by Cincinnati to a minor league contract on May 10, 2015, and was released on July 16, 2015.

=== York Revolution ===
On July 26, 2015, Constanza signed with the York Revolution of the Atlantic League of Professional Baseball. In 31 games he hit .324/.379/.374 with 0 home runs, 13 RBIs and 21 stolen bases.

=== Tampa Bay Rays ===
On August 31, 2015, Constanza signed a minor league contract with the Tampa Bay Rays.

=== Leones de Yucatán ===
On March 29, 2016, Constanza signed with the Leones de Yucatán of the Mexican Baseball League. He was released on April 30. In 9 games he went 15-37 (.405) with 0 home runs, 3 RBIs and 1 stolen base.

=== Broncos de Reynosa ===
On May 24, 2016, Constanza signed with the Broncos de Reynosa of the Mexican Baseball League. He was released on June 28. In 27 games he struggled hitting .228/.278/.257 with 0 home runs, 6 RBIs and 1 stolen base.

=== York Revolution (second stint) ===
On March 8, 2017, Constanza signed with the York Revolution of the Atlantic League of Professional Baseball. This marks his second stint with the team as he played with them in 2015. He was released on May 27, 2017. In 25 games he slashed .235/.284/.255 with 0 home runs and 6 RBIs.

== Minor League awards ==
- 2× International League All-Star (2010, 2011)
- New York–Penn League All-Star (2005)
- DSL MVP (2004)
