= Chino Cadahia =

Cuban baseball coach (born 1957)

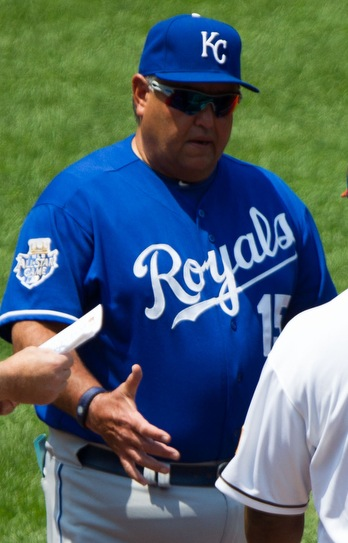
- Cadahia with the Kansas City Royals in 2012
- Coach
- Born: November 22, 1957 (age 68); Havana, Cuba
- Bats: Right Throws: Right
- Stats at Baseball Reference

Teams
- Atlanta Braves (1998–2010); Kansas City Royals (2011–2013)

Aurelio "Chino" Cadahia (born November 22, 1957) is a Cuban Major League Baseball coach.

Cadahia joined the Kansas City Royals in 2011 after spending the last 15 seasons in the Braves' organization, including the last four seasons as the bench coach for the Major League club. He started with the Braves in 1996 as the roving catching coordinator and was named minor league field coordinator in 1997. Prior to his time with Atlanta, Cadahia spent 12 years in the Rangers' minor league system as a pitching coach and manager. Hall of Fame catcher Ivan Rodriguez, signed by the Rangers as a 16-year-old in 1988, says Cadahia was the one who first called him "Pudge," because he was "short and stocky." Cadahia was drafted by the Phillies out of Miami-Dade Community College. He played in the minors from 1977 to 1983 for the Phillies and the Twins.

He was named the Kansas City Royals bench coach on September 30, 2011. He remained in the role until the end of the 2013 season.
