= Eric O'Flaherty =

American baseball player (born 1985)

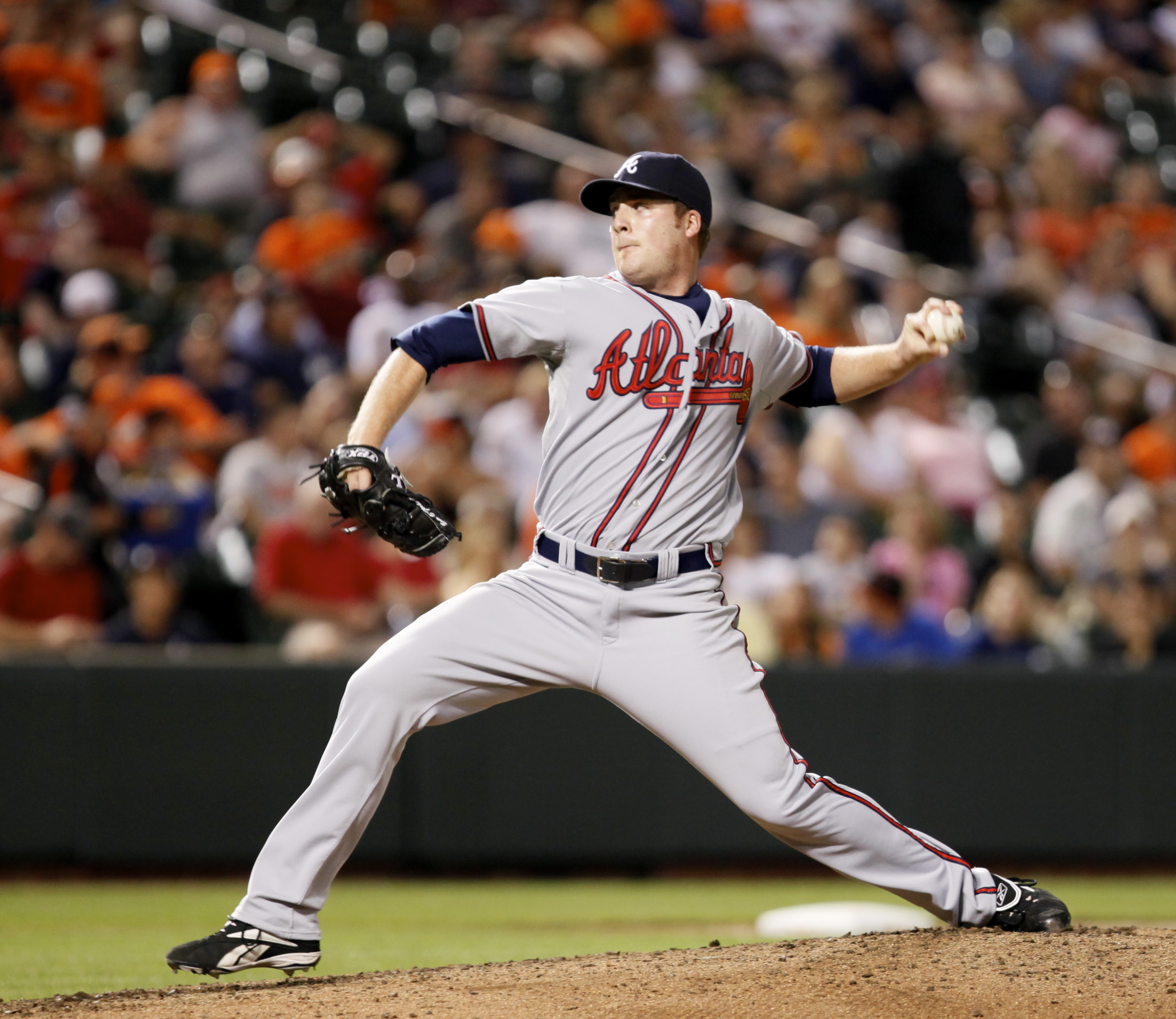
- O'Flaherty with the Atlanta Braves
- Pitcher
- Born: February 5, 1985 (age 41); Walla Walla, Washington, U.S.
- Batted: Left Threw: Left

MLB debut
- August 16, 2006, for the Seattle Mariners

Last MLB appearance
- June 10, 2017, for the Atlanta Braves

MLB statistics
- Win–loss record: 23–15
- Earned run average: 3.70
- Strikeouts: 318
- Stats at Baseball Reference

Teams
- Seattle Mariners (2006–2008); Atlanta Braves (2009–2013); Oakland Athletics (2014–2015); New York Mets (2015); Atlanta Braves (2016–2017)

Eric George O'Flaherty (born February 5, 1985) is an American former professional baseball pitcher. He played in Major League Baseball (MLB) for the Seattle Mariners, Atlanta Braves, Oakland Athletics, and New York Mets.

O'Flaherty was the first reliever in MLB history to record an earned run average below 1.00 with at least 70 appearances in a season, and was the first pitcher in Mariners franchise history to begin his MLB career with seven consecutive wins.

== Early career ==
O'Flaherty graduated from Walla Walla High School in Walla Walla, Washington. As a senior at Walla Walla High School, he had a 5–2 win–loss record, an earned run average (ERA) of 1.99, and 83 strikeouts. He earned Pitcher of the Year honors in the Big Nine Conference. The Seattle Mariners selected O'Flaherty in the sixth round of the 2003 Major League Baseball draft. He was the 176th pick overall. He was the first player since Drew Bledsoe was drafted that went to Walla Walla High School. As of 2022 he is currently an assistant baseball coach at Walla Walla High School

== Professional career ==
=== Seattle Mariners ===
==== Minor leagues ====
O'Flaherty quickly made his way through the Mariners' minor league affiliate teams. He started 2006 with the Single-A Inland Empire 66ers where he had a 3.45 ERA and struck out 33 batters in 16 relief appearances. On May 27, he moved to the Doulble-A San Antonio Missions where he had a record of 2–2 with an ERA of 1.14 and seven saves in 25 games. He moved again that same season to the Triple-A Tacoma Rainiers on August 9; he would stay with them until his August 16 appearance with the Mariners. His combined minor league record in 2006 was 3–3 with a 2.01 ERA, eight saves, and 73 strikeouts in 43 games.

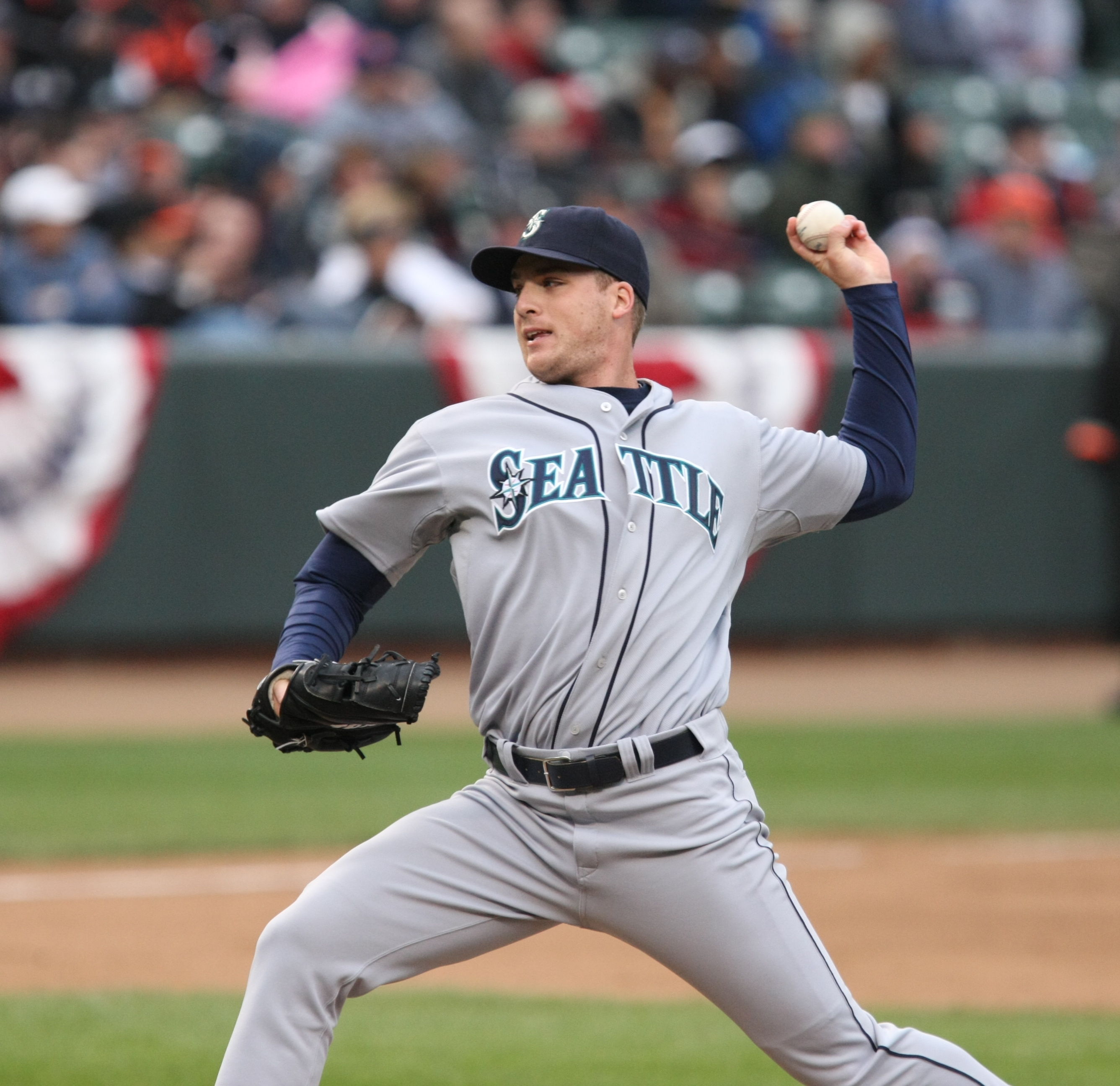
O'Flaherty pitching for the Seattle Mariners in 2008

==== Major leagues ====
O'Flaherty made his debut in the major leagues on August 16, 2006, against the Oakland Athletics. He pitched 2/3 of an inning, faced 4 batters, allowed one hit, one walk, and got his first strikeout in the major leagues.

On the same day of O'Flaherty's debut, the Seattle Times reported that his "big-league visit was too short to qualify as a cup of coffee". The night before he had flown in from Triple-A Tacoma in order to replace a seemingly injured Rafael Soriano. When O'Flaherty arrived, Soriano convinced coaches he was healthy enough to remain on the Mariners' roster, so O'Flaherty was sidelined out of uniform for the rest of the night. The next day, however, infielder Greg Dobbs was returned to Triple-A, allowing O'Flaherty to pitch his first major league game.

During his debut season in 2006, O'Flaherty faced some challenges: however, his pitching became more refined in the 2007 season and O'Flaherty quickly become a mainstay relief pitcher for the Mariners. Things went downhill for him in 2008. In 7 games for the Mariners, O'Flaherty gave up 15 earned runs for a 20.25 ERA and was optioned to the minors.

=== Atlanta Braves ===
On November 20, 2008, O'Flaherty was claimed off waivers by the Atlanta Braves.

On April 7, 2009, O'Flaherty made his Braves debut, pitching 1 1/3 scoreless innings and allowing one hit. He spent the entire 2009 season on the active roster and finished the year with a 3.04 ERA, a 1.243 WHIP, and a 39-to-18 strikeout-to-walk ratio in 56 1/3 innings. O'Flaherty was particularly effective against left-handed batters, who hit only .215 and posted a .270 on base average and a .290 slugging average off of him.

O'Flaherty served as an important part of the Braves bullpen during the 2011 season where he pitched primarily during the 7th inning. Along with Craig Kimbrel and Jonny Venters, the three formed the back end of the Braves bullpen. As of August 21, 2011 the trio had three of the six lowest ERAs in the NL. In fact, O'Flaherty became the first pitcher ever to post a sub-1.00 ERA in 70 or more appearances.

In January 2012, the Braves and O'Flaherty agreed on a 1-year deal worth $2.49 million, that nearly tripled O'Flaherty's previous salary of $895,000. O'Flaherty performed well in the 2012 season playing 64 games with a 3-0 and a 1.73 ERA.

O'Flaherty was placed on the disabled list on May 18, 2013, due to a left elbow strain. An MRI revealed that there was a torn UCL in his left elbow. O'Flaherty underwent Tommy John surgery on May 21, 2013, and was knocked out for the rest of the 2013 season.

=== Oakland Athletics ===
On January 22, 2014, O'Flaherty signed a two-year contract with the Oakland Athletics. He made 21 appearances for Oakland over the course of the season, compiling a 1-0 record and 2.25 ERA with 15 strikeouts and one save across 20 innings of work.

O'Flaherty was activated from the disabled list on June 2, 2015, having been dealing with a left shoulder strain. He made 25 appearances out of the bullpen for Oakland, registering a 1-2 record and 5.91 ERA with 15 strikeouts across 21 1/3 innings pitched. O'Flaherty was designated for assignment by the Athletics on August 1.

=== New York Mets ===
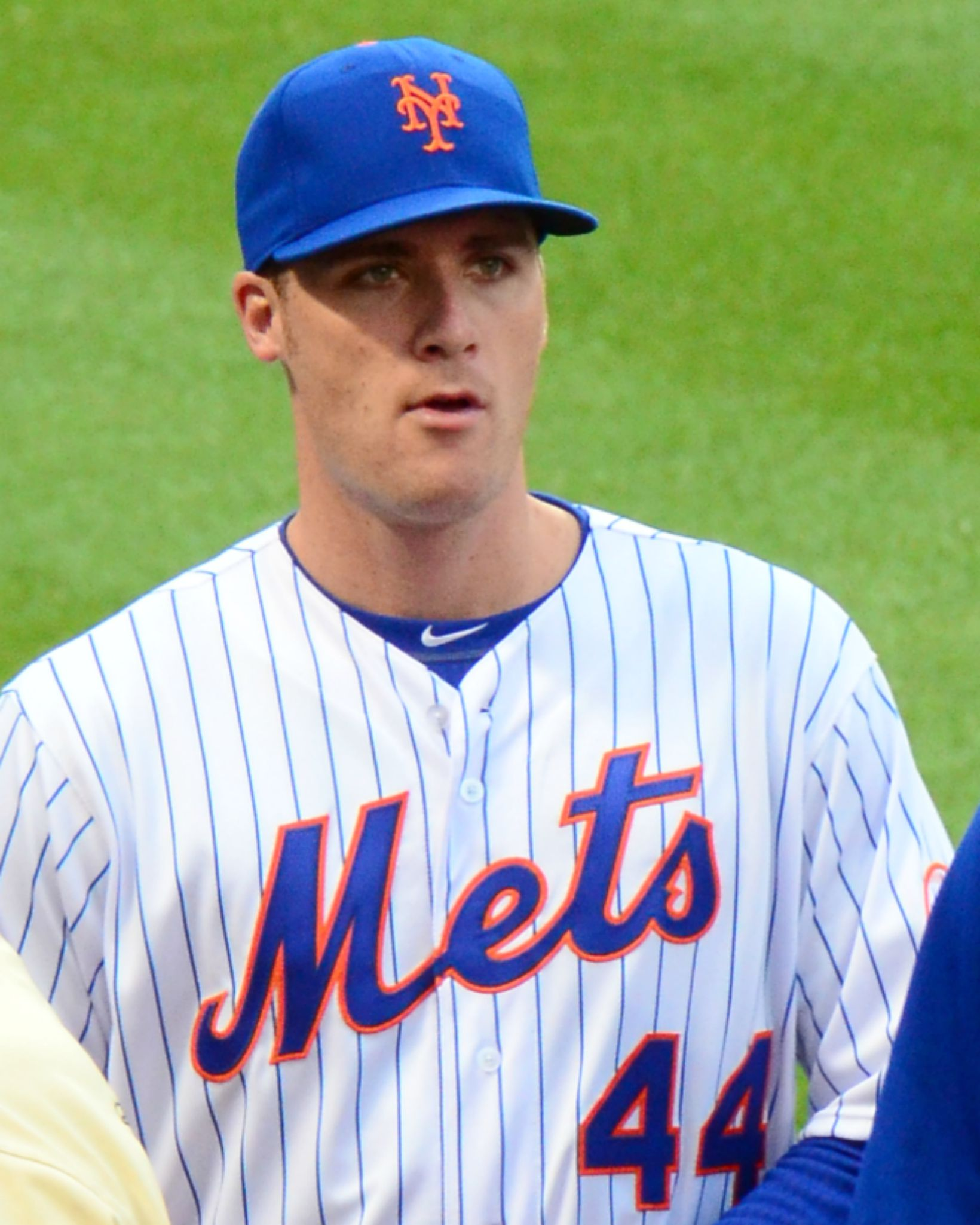
O'Flaherty with the New York Mets in 2015

On August 4, 2015, The New York Mets acquired O'Flaherty and cash considerations for a player to be named later, minor league pitcher Darwin Frias. He pitched in many relief appearances throughout the regular season, and made the postseason roster. He subsequently became a free agent.

=== Atlanta Braves (second stint) ===
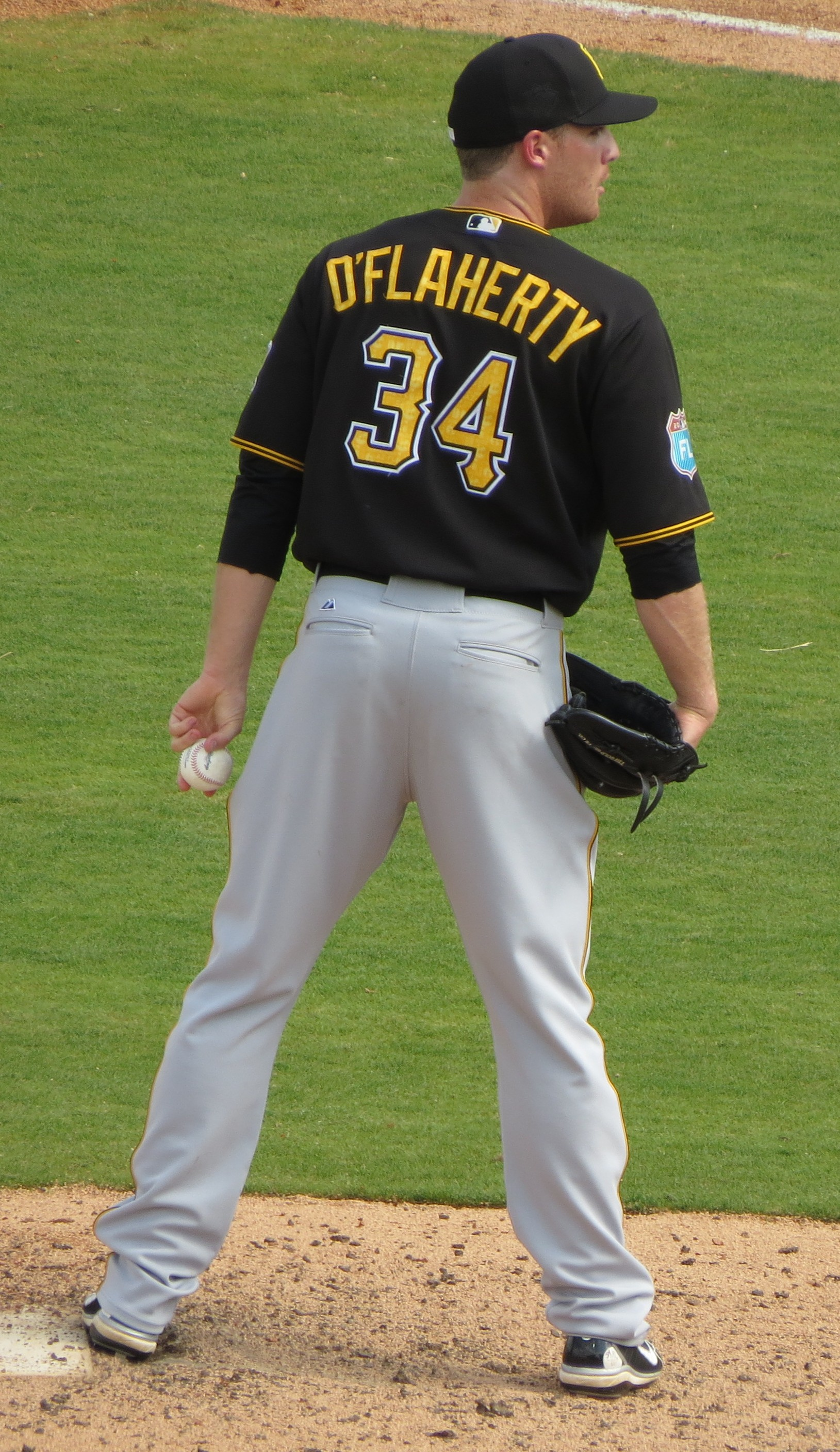
O'Flaherty pitching for the Pittsburgh Pirates in 2016 Spring Training

On February 11, 2016, O'Flaherty signed a minor league contract with the Pittsburgh Pirates. On March 27, he was traded to the Atlanta Braves. O'Flaherty pitched to a 6.91 ERA in 39 games, and spent two stints on the disabled list, the first time for a strained knee. He returned to the DL for on August 19 with neuritis, ending his season.

On December 6, 2016, O'Flaherty re-signed with the Braves organization on a minor league contract. On March 28, 2017, the Braves announced that O'Flaherty had made the team's Opening Day roster. In 22 appearances for Atlanta, he struggled to a 7.85 ERA with 15 strikeouts across 18 1/3 innings pitched. O'Flaherty was released on July 21, to clear roster space for Anthony Recker, who had his contract purchased.

== Pitching style ==
O'Flaherty's main weapon was a sinker in the low 90s that he threw about half the time. He complemented the sinker with a four-seam fastball, a slider in the mid 80s, and a changeup in the mid 80s. His pitch selection did not vary greatly between right-handed and left-handed hitters, although lefties tended to see fewer sinkers and more sliders. O'Flaherty often favored the slider when he was ahead in the count.
