= 2009 Washington Nationals season =

2009 Washington Nationals
- League: National League
- Division: East
- Ballpark: Nationals Park
- City: Washington, D.C.
- Record: 59–103 (.364)
- Divisional place: 5th
- Owners: Lerner Enterprises
- General managers: Jim Bowden, Mike Rizzo
- Managers: Manny Acta, Jim Riggleman
- Television: MASN; WDCW (CW 50); Bob Carpenter, Ray Knight, Rob Dibble
- Radio: WWWT; Charlie Slowes, Dave Jageler

The Washington Nationals' 2009 season was the fifth season for the American baseball franchise of Major League Baseball in the District of Columbia, and the 41st since the original team was started in Montreal, Quebec, Canada. It involved the Nationals attempting to win the National League East after a disappointing 59–102 season the year before.

On July 12, manager Manny Acta was fired and replaced with bench coach Jim Riggleman, though only as an interim manager. Under Acta, the Nationals compiled an MLB worst 26–61 record in 2009 through the All-Star break and a 158–252 record in Acta's three seasons with the Nationals. Riggleman would be named full-time manager in November 2009.

The Nationals finished the year with a 59–103 record, worse than the year before by one loss. For the second straight season, they finished with the worst record in Major League Baseball.

Nationals' third baseman Ryan Zimmerman won a Gold Glove Award as the best defensive third baseman in the National League and a Silver Slugger Award as the best offensive third baseman in the league. It would be the final season the Nationals lost a hundred games for 13 years.

== Offseason ==
On November 3, 2008, the Nationals traded minor-leaguer Ryan Buchter to the Chicago Cubs for minor-leaguer Matt Avery. On November 10, 2008, they traded Emilio Bonifacio and minor-leaguers Jake Smolinski and P. J. Dean to the Florida Marlins for Scott Olsen and Josh Willingham.

== Changed uniforms ==
For the 2009 season, the Nationals altered their uniforms. The interlocking "DC" was removed from the star-spangled circle and moved to the left sleeve of both the home and away uniforms. It also has removed from the alternate red jersey and replaced with the "curly W" from the team's cap. A new navy alternate jersey with the interlocked "DC" on the left chest in a "stars and stripes" flag pattern, which has also been emulated on the alternate navy cap, which was worn several times in 2009. Finally, in a tribute to the former baseball teams in the District of Columbia, a script writing of the city name replaced the block lettering, emulating the Senators' script of the 1950s and 1960s – though as those teams used "Senators" on both their home and away uniforms, this marks the first time the "curly W" has actually appeared as part of the word "Washington" on an MLB jersey.

The uniforms gained notoriety when on April 17 in a game against the Florida Marlins, the jerseys of Ryan Zimmerman and Adam Dunn read "Natinals" on the front of the jersey instead of "Nationals" for the first three innings of the game. The Nationals did not catch the error as they only checked the back of the shirts, not the front, but were able to assign to Dunn and Zimmerman the correct jerseys later in the game. The company who manufactured the jerseys, Majestic Athletic, apologized for the error.

== Mascot ==
In March 2009, the Nationals introduced a new version of Screech, their bald eagle mascot who wears the home cap and jersey of the team. The original Screech who "hatched" at Robert F. Kennedy Memorial Stadium in 2005 during the third home game in Nationals history and had appeared at the team's home games during its first four seasons in Washington, was chubby, but the new Screech was slim. The Nationals explained that they had redesigned Screech because he had "grown up" and become a "teenager."

== Spring training ==
The Nationals held their 2009 spring training in Viera, Florida, with home games played at Space Coast Stadium.

== Regular season ==
=== Season standings ===
NL East
Team	W	L	Pct.	GB	Home	Road
Philadelphia Phillies	93	69	.574	—	45‍–‍36	48‍–‍33
Florida Marlins	87	75	.537	6	43‍–‍38	44‍–‍37
Atlanta Braves	86	76	.531	7	40‍–‍41	46‍–‍35
New York Mets	70	92	.432	23	41‍–‍40	29‍–‍52
Washington Nationals	59	103	.364	34	33‍–‍48	26‍–‍55

=== Record vs. opponents ===
2009 National League record Source: MLB Standings Grid – 2009
Team	AZ	ATL	CHC	CIN	COL	FLA	HOU	LAD	MIL	NYM	PHI	PIT	SD	SF	STL	WAS	AL
Arizona	–	3–4	4-2	1–5	7-11	5–3	5–4	7-11	2–5	5–2	1–5	6–1	11-7	5-13	2–4	1–5	5–10
Atlanta	4–3	–	4–2	3–6	4–4	8-10	3-3	4–3	3–3	13–5	10-8	3–4	3–3	3–4	4–2	10-8	7–8
Chicago	2-4	2–4	–	10-5	2–4	4–3	11–6	3–5	10-7	3-3	1–5	10-4	4–5	4-2	6-10	5–2	6–9
Cincinnati	5-1	6-3	5-10	–	0-7	3-3	12-4	1-5	8-7	2-4	2-5	13-5	1-6	3-3	8-8	3-4	6-9
Colorado	11-7	4-4	4-2	7-0	–	2-4	2-5	4-14	6-0	3-4	2-4	6-3	10-8	8-10	6-1	6-0	11-4
Florida	3-5	10-8	3-4	3-3	4-2	–	4–3	3-3	3-4	11-7	9-9	2-4	4-2	3-4	3-3	12-6	10-8
Houston	4–5	3-3	6-11	4-12	5-2	3-4	–	4–3	5-10	1-5	6-2	10-5	6-1	2-4	6-9	3-3	6-9
Los Angeles	11-7	3-4	5-3	5-1	14-4	3-3	3-4	–	3–3	5-1	4-3	4-3	10-8	11-7	2-5	3-2	9-9
Milwaukee	5-2	3-3	7-10	7-8	0-6	4-3	10-5	3-3	–	3-3	4-3	9-5	2-4	4-5	9-9	5-3	5-10
New York	2-5	5-13	3-3	4-2	4-3	7-11	5-1	1-5	3-3	–	6-12	4-3	2-5	5-3	4-5	10-8	5–10
Philadelphia	5-1	8-10	5-1	5-2	4-2	9-9	2-6	3-4	3-4	12-6	–	4-2	5-2	3-4	4-1	15-3	6-12
Pittsburgh	1-6	4-3	4-10	5-13	3-6	4-2	5-10	3-4	5-9	3-4	2-4	–	3-4	2-4	5-10	5-3	8–7
San Diego	7-11	3-3	5-4	6-1	8-10	2-4	1-6	8-10	4-2	5-2	2-5	4-3	–	10-8	1-6	4-2	5–10
San Francisco	13-5	4–3	2–4	3–3	10-8	4–3	4–2	7-11	5-4	3–5	4–3	4–2	8-10	–	4–3	4–2	9–6
St. Louis	4-2	2-4	10-6	8-8	1-6	3-3	9-6	5-2	9-9	5-4	1-4	10-5	6-1	3-4	–	6–1	9–6
Washington	5-1	8-10	2-5	4-3	0-6	6-12	3-3	2-3	3-5	8-10	3-15	3-5	2-4	2-4	1-6	–	7–11

Nationals vs. American League
Team	AL East				
Team	BAL	BOS	NYY	TBR	TOR
**Washington**	2-4	1-2	2-1	0-3	2–1

=== Opening Day lineup ===
Opening Day Starters
Name	Position
Lastings Milledge	Center fielder
Cristian Guzmán	Shortstop
Ryan Zimmerman	Third baseman
Adam Dunn	Left fielder
Nick Johnson	First baseman
Austin Kearns	Right fielder
Ronnie Belliard	Second baseman
Jesús Flores	Catcher
John Lannan	Starting pitcher

=== Notable transactions ===
- April 29, 2009: The Nationals traded minor-leaguer Kyle Gunderson to the Florida Marlins for Aaron Thompson.
- June 17, 2009: The Nationals sent Mike O'Connor to the San Diego Padres as part of a conditional deal.
- June 28, 2009: The Nationals traded Ryan Langerhans to the Seattle Mariners for Michael Morse.
- June 30, 2009: The Nationals traded Joel Hanrahan and Lastings Milledge to the Pittsburgh Pirates for Sean Burnett and Nyjer Morgan.
- July 31, 2009: The Nationals traded Joe Beimel to the Colorado Rockies for minor-leaguers Robinson Fabian and Ryan Mattheus and traded Nick Johnson to the Florida Marlins for Logan Kensing.
- August 6, 2009: The Nationals purchased minor-leaguers Norris Hopper and Daryle Ward from the Chicago White Sox and traded Anderson Hernández to the New York Mets for minor-leaguer Greg Veloz.
- August 31, 2009: The Nationals traded Ronnie Belliard to the Los Angeles Dodgers for minor-leaguer Luis Garcia and a player to be named later. The Dodgers sent minor-leaguer Víctor Gárate to the Nationals on September 2, 2009, to complete the trade.
- September 18, 2009: The Nationals purchased Jamie Burke from the Seattle Mariners.

=== Draft ===
The 2009 Major League Baseball draft took place from June 9 to June 11. With their first pick – the first pick overall – the Nationals selected pitcher Stephen Strasburg. Other notable players the Nationals selected were pitcher Drew Storen (10th overall, a first-round supplemental pick they received for failing to sign Aaron Crow in 2008), second baseman Jeff Kobernus (second round, 50th overall), shortstop Michael A. Taylor (sixth round, 172nd overall), pitcher Taylor Jordan (ninth round, 262nd overall), pitcher Nate Karns (12th round, 352nd overall), and pitcher Marcus Stroman (18th round, 532nd overall). Stroman opted not to sign with the team.

=== Roster ===
2009 Washington Nationals
**Roster**
**Pitchers**: 40 Collin Balester; 97 Joe Beimel; 57 Jason Bergmann; 17 Sean Burnett; 45,49 Daniel Cabrera; 36 Tyler Clippard; 43 Jesús Colomé; 48 Ross Detwiler; 55 Marco Estrada; 56 Víctor Gárate; 38 Joel Hanrahan; 61 Liván Hernández; 58 Mike Hinckley; 26 Logan Kensing; 31 John Lannan; 61 Wilfredo Ledezma; 54 Mike MacDougal; 60 J. D. Martin; 39 Shairon Martis; 49,50 Garrett Mock; 19 Scott Olsen; 52 Saúl Rivera; 58 Zack Segovia; 59 Steven Shell; 29 Jorge Sosa; 35,39 Craig Stammen; 50,55 Julián Tavárez; 41 Ron Villone; 32 Kip Wells; 27 Jordan Zimmermann	**Catchers**: 7 Josh Bard; 32 Jamie Burke; 3 Jesús Flores; 23 Wil Nieves; **Infielders**: 10 Ronnie Belliard; 13 Alex Cintrón; 6 Ian Desmond; 12 Alberto González; 15 Cristian Guzmán; 6 Anderson Hernández; 24 Nick Johnson; 28 Michael Morse; 24 Pete Orr; 11 Ryan Zimmerman; **Outfielders**: 2 Roger Bernadina; 34 Elijah Dukes; 44 Adam Dunn; 22 Willie Harris; 25 Austin Kearns; 30 Justin Maxwell; 44 Lastings Milledge; 1 Nyjer Morgan; 8 Jorge Padilla; 4 Corey Patterson; 16 Josh Willingham	**Manager**: 14 Manny Acta (Fired on July 12, 2009); 5 Jim Riggleman (Promoted on July 12, 2009); **Coaches**: 39 Pat Corrales (bench) (Hired on July 12, 2009); 18 Rick Eckstein (hitting); 9 Marquis Grissom (first base); 53 Randy Knorr (bullpen); 37 Pat Listach (third base); 45 Steve McCatty (pitching); 5 Jim Riggleman (bench) (Promoted to Manager on July 12, 2009); 46 Randy St. Claire (pitching)

=== Attendance ===
Finishing with the worst record in Major League Baseball for the second consecutive year, the Nationals drew only 1,817,226 fans at Nationals Park in 2009, placing them 13th in attendance among the 16 National League teams for the second year in a row. It was the lowest attendance total in their short history in Washington. Their highest attendance at a home game was on April 5, when they drew 41,290 for a game against the Philadelphia Phillies on Opening Day, while their lowest was 10,999 for a game against the Houston Astros on September 20. Their average home attendance was 22,716 per game, their lowest since arriving in Washington in 2005, but slightly higher than their average the following season.

=== Game log ===
Legend
	Nationals win
	Nationals loss
	Postponement
**Bold**	Nationals team member

2009 game log
April (5–16)

#	Date	Opponent	Score	Win	Loss	Save	Attendance	Record
1	April 6	@ Marlins	12 – 6	Nolasco (1-0)	**Lannan** (0-1)		34,323	0-1
2	April 7	@ Marlins	8 – 3	Johnson (1-0)	**Olsen** (0-1)		11,124	0-2
3	April 8	@ Marlins	6 – 4	Volstad (1-0)	**Cabrera** (0-1)	Lindstrom (1)	13,308	0-3
4	April 10	@ Braves	6 – 5 (10)	Campillo (1-0)	**Beimel** (0-1)		48,327	0-4
5	April 11	@ Braves	5 – 3	Kawakami (1-0)	**Lannan** (0-2)	González (1)	34,325	0-5
6	April 12	@ Braves	8 – 5	Jurrjens (2-0)	**Olsen** (0-2)	Soriano (1)	19,873	0-6
7	April 13	Phillies	9 – 8	Moyer (1-1)	**Rivera** (0-1)	Lidge (3)	40,386	0-7
–	April 15	Phillies	Postponed (rain) Rescheduled for May 16 as part of a doubleheader					
8	April 16	Phillies	8 – 2	**Martis** (1-0)	Blanton (0-1)		20,494	1-7
9	April 17	Marlins	3 – 2 (10)	Oviedo (1-0)	**Rivera** (0-2)	Lindstrom (2)	19,026	1-8
10	April 18	Marlins	9 – 6 (11)	Calero (1-0)	**Tavárez** (0-1)		19,860	1-9
11	April 19	Marlins	7 – 4	Oviedo (2-0)	**Rivera** (0-3)	Lindstrom (3)	16,974	1-10
12	April 20	Braves	3 – 2	**Zimmermann** (1-0)	Lowe (1-1)	**Hanrahan** (1)	12,464	2-10
13	April 21	Braves	4 – 3	**Martis** (2-0)	Kawakami (1-2)	**Hanrahan** (2)	15,431	3-10
14	April 22	Braves	1 – 0	González (1-0)	**Mock** (0-1)	Soriano (2)	15,567	3-11
15	April 24	@ Mets	4 – 3	Santana (3-1)	**Olsen** (0-3)	Rodríguez (4)	40,522	3-12
16	April 25	@ Mets	8 – 2	Pelfrey (2-0)	**Cabrera** (0-2)		39,960	3-13
17	April 26	@ Mets	8 – 1	**Zimmermann** (2-0)	Pérez (1-2)		40,023	4-13
18	April 27	@ Phillies	13 – 11	Happ (1-0)	**Hanrahan** (0-1)	Madson (1)	41,620	4-14
19	April 28	@ Phillies	7 – 1	Durbin (1-0)	**Lannan** (0-3)		43,930	4-15
20	April 29	@ Phillies	4 – 1	**Olsen** (1-3)	Myers (1-2)	**Tavárez** (1)	36,351	5-15
21	April 30	Cardinals	9 – 4	Pérez (1-1)	**Tavárez** (0-2)		18,007	5-16

May (9–20)

#	Date	Opponent	Score	Win	Loss	Save	Attendance	Record
22	May 1	Cardinals	6 – 2	Wellemeyer (2-2)	**Zimmermann** (2-1)		20,712	5-17
23	May 2	Cardinals	6 – 1	**Martis** (3-0)	Piñeiro (4-1)		19,950	6-17
–	May 3	Cardinals	Postponed (rain) Rescheduled for July 23					
24	May 4	Astros	9 – 4	**Lannan** (1-3)	Wright (1-1)		14,115	7-17
25	May 5*	Astros	11 – 10 (11)	**Hanrahan** (1-1)	Hawkins (0-1)		19,328	8-17
26	May 6	@ Dodgers	10 – 3	Kershaw (1-2)	**Cabrera** (0-3)		31,348	8-18
27	May 7	@ Dodgers	11 – 9	**Villone** (1-0)	Wade (0-2)		37,074	9-18
28	May 8	@ Diamondbacks	5 – 4	**Martis** (4-0)	Petit (0-3)	**Wells** (1)	28,660	10-18
29	May 9	@ Diamondbacks	2 – 1	**Lannan** (2-3)	Davis (2-5)	**Hanrahan** (3)	27,247	11-18
30	May 10	@ Diamondbacks	10 – 8	Vásquez (1-1)	**Kensing** (0-2)	Qualls (8)	25,079	11-19
31	May 11	@ Giants	11 – 7	Johnson (3-3)	**Cabrera** (0-4)	Wilson (8)	23,934	11-20
32	May 12	@ Giants	9 – 7	Medders (2-1)	**Beimel** (0-2)		25,701	11-21
33	May 13	@ Giants	6 – 3	**Martis** (5-0)	Zito (1-3)	**Wells** (2)	30,120	12-21
34	May 15	Phillies	10 – 6 (12)	Happ (2-0)	**Wells** (0-1)		23,430	12-22
35	May 16 (1)	Phillies	8 – 5	Myers (3-2)	**Olsen** (1-4)	Lidge (6)	19,910	12-23
36	May 16 (2)	Phillies	7 – 5 (6)	Carpenter (1-0)	**Cabrera** (0-5)	Condrey (1)	23,896	12-24
37	May 17	Phillies	8 – 6	Escalona (1-0)	**Tavárez** (0-3)	Lidge (7)	29,577	12-25
38	May 18	Pirates	12 – 7	Ohlendorf (5-3)	**Mock** (0-2)		14,549	12-26
39	May 19	Pirates	8 – 5 (10)	Gorzelanny (1-0)	**Beimel** (0-3)		18,579	12-27
40	May 20	Pirates	2 – 1	Grabow (2-0)	**Hanrahan** (1-2)	Capps (8)	17,854	12-28
41	May 21	Pirates	5 – 4	**Tavárez** (1-3)	Gorzelanny (1-1)	**Hanrahan** (4)	17,816	13-28
42	May 22	Orioles	4 – 2 (12)	Báez (3-1)	**Wells** (0-2)	Sherrill (8)	22,556	13-29
43	May 23	Orioles	2 – 1	Bass (3-1)	**Tavárez** (1-4)	Sherrill (9)	31,833	13-30
44	May 24	Orioles	8 – 5	**Villone** (2-0)	Ray (0-1)	**Hanrahan** (5)	30,880	14-30
45	May 25	@ Mets	5 – 2	Maine (4-3)	**Lannan** (2-4)	Rodríguez (13)	41,103	14-31
46	May 26	@ Mets	6 – 1	Hernández (4-1)	**Stammen** (0-1)		39,376	14-32
47	May 27	@ Mets	7 – 4	Santana (7-2)	**Zimmermann** (2-2)		40,171	14-33
48	May 29	@ Phillies	5 – 4	Happ (3-0)	**Detwiler** (0-1)	Lidge (10)	45,202	14-34
49	May 30	@ Phillies	9 – 6	Hamels (3-2)	**Martis** (5-1)	Lidge (11)	45,121	14-35
50	May 31	@ Phillies	4 – 2	Moyer (4-5)	**Lannan** (2-5)	Lidge (12)	45,239	14-36
*Game suspended by rain at 10–10 in the bottom of the 11th inning, completed on July 9 at Minute Maid Park.

June (9–17)

#	Date	Opponent	Score	Win	Loss	Save	Attendance	Record
51	June 2	Giants	10 – 6	**Villone** (3-0)	Howry (0-3)		17,331	15-36
–	June 3	Giants	Postponed (rain) Rescheduled for June 4 as part of a doubleheader					
52	June 4 (1)	Giants	5 – 1	Johnson (5-4)	**Zimmermann** (2-3)	Wilson (13)	16,787 (Note: The two games on June 4 were played as a single-admission doubleheader with attendance counted only for the two games combined.)	15-37
53	June 4 (2)	Giants	4 – 1 (6)	Cain (7-1)	**Detwiler** (0-2)		16,787	15-38
54	June 5	Mets	3 – 1 (10)	Green (1-2)	**Hanrahan** (1-3)	Rodríguez (15)	20,353	15-39
55	June 6	Mets	7 – 1	**Lannan** (3-5)	Maine (5-4)		31,456	16-39
56	June 7	Mets	7 – 0	Hernández (5-1)	**Stammen** (0-2)		31,841	16-40
57	June 9	Reds	3 – 2	Cueto (6-3)	**Detwiler** (0-3)	Cordero (15)	16,274	16-41
58	June 10	Reds	4 – 2 (12)	Masset (4-0)	**Villone** (3-1)	Weathers (1)	19,766	16-42
59	June 11	Reds	3 – 2	**Tavárez** (2-4)	Herrera (0-2)	**Beimel** (1)	19,703	17-42
60	June 12	@ Rays	4 – 3	Howell (2-2)	**Villone** (3-2)		18,273	17-43
61	June 13	@ Rays	8 – 3	Sonnanstine (5-6)	**Bergmann** (0-1)		30,586	17-44
62	June 14	@ Rays	5 – 4	Wheeler (2-1)	**Villone** (3-3)	Howell (3)	25,841	17-45
63	June 16	@ Yankees	5 – 3	Sabathia (6-4)	**Villone** (3-4)	Rivera (15)	44,873	17-46
64	June 17	@ Yankees	3 – 2	**Lannan** (4-5)	Wang (0-5)	**MacDougal** (1)	46,052	18-46
65	June 18	@ Yankees	3 – 0	**Stammen** (1-2)	Chamberlain (3-2)	**MacDougal** (2)	45,143	19-46
66	June 19	Blue Jays	2 – 1 (11)	**Colomé** (1-0)	Frasor (5-1)		20,860	20-46
67	June 20	Blue Jays	5 – 3 (12)	**Tavárez** (3-4)	Richmond (5-4)		22,142	21-46
68	June 21	Blue Jays	9 – 4	Romero (4-3)	**Martis** (5-2)		26,610	21-47
69	June 23	Red Sox	11 – 3	Delcarmen (2-1)	**Tavárez** (3-5)		41,517	21-48
70	June 24	Red Sox	6 – 4	Lester (6-6)	**Stammen** (1-3)	Papelbon (17)	41,530	21-49
71	June 25	Red Sox	9 – 3	**Zimmermann** (3-3)	Smoltz (0-1)		41,985	22-49
72	June 26	@ Orioles	11 – 1	Bergesen (5-2)	**Detwiler** (0-4)		45,024	22-50
73	June 27	@ Orioles	6 – 3	Guthrie (6-7)	**Martis** (5-3)	Sherrill (16)	39,633	22-51
74	June 28	@ Orioles	5 – 3	**Lannan** (5-5)	Hernández (1-2)	**MacDougal** (3)	25,068	23-51
75	June 29	@ Marlins	4 – 2	Nolasco (5-6)	**Villone** (3-5)	Oviedo (3)	10,623	23-52
76	June 30	@ Marlins	7 – 5 (7)	Pinto (3-1)	**Beimel** (0-4)		11,821	23-53

July (9–18)

#	Date	Opponent	Score	Win	Loss	Save	Attendance	Record
77	July 1	@ Marlins	5 – 3	Meyer (2-0)	**Tavárez** (3-6)	Oviedo (4)	27,032	23-54
78	July 3	Braves	9 – 8	Logan (1-0)	**Colomé** (1-1)	Soriano (8)	33,982	23-55
79	July 4	Braves	5 – 3	**Lannan** (6-5)	González (3-1)	**MacDougal** (4)	23,708	24-55
80	July 5	Braves	5 – 3	**Olsen** (2-4)	Lowe (7-7)	**MacDougal** (5)	22,677	25-55
81	July 6	@ Rockies	1 – 0	Marquis (11-5)	**Stammen** (1-4)	Street (20)	25,205	25-56
82	July 7	@ Rockies	5 – 4	Embree (2-2)	**Tavárez** (3-7)	Street (21)	25,314	25-57
83	July 8	@ Rockies	10 – 4	de la Rosa (6-7)	**Detwiler** (0-5)		23,098	25-58
84	July 9	@ Astros	9 – 4	Arias (2-0)	**Lannan** (6-6)		25,490	25-59
85	July 10	@ Astros	6 – 5	Fulchino (3-3)	**Beimel** (0-5)		33,085	25-60
86	July 11	@ Astros	13 – 2	**Stammen** (2-4)	Hampton (5-6)		30,052	26-60
87	July 12	@ Astros	5 – 0	Moehler (6-5)	**Zimmermann** (3-4)	Valverde (8)	28,680	26-61
**All–Star Break (July 13–15)**
88	July 16	Cubs	6 – 2	Harden (6-6)	**Lannan** (6-7)		26,980	26-62
89	July 17	Cubs	3 – 1	Zambrano (6-4)	**Stammen** (2-5)	Gregg (17)	27,581	26-63
90	July 18	Cubs	6 – 5	Wells (5-4)	**Zimmermann** (3-5)	Gregg (18)	36,014	26-64
91	July 19	Cubs	11 – 3	Hart (1-1)	**Mock** (0-3)		34,574	26-65
92	July 20	Mets	6 – 2	Hernández (6-5)	**Martin** (0-1)		19,169	26-66
93	July 21	Mets	4 – 0	**Lannan** (7-7)	Pérez (2-3)		23,390	27-66
94	July 22	Mets	3 – 1	**Stammen** (3-5)	Pelfrey (7-6)	**MacDougal** (6)	23,583	28-66
95	July 23	Cardinals	4 – 1 (7)	Wainwright (11-6)	**Balester** (0-1)		25,359	28-67
96	July 24	Padres	6 – 2	Latos (1-1)	**Mock** (0-4)		23,506	28-68
97	July 25	Padres	13 – 1	**Clippard** (1-0)	Stauffer (0-2)		21,834	29-68
98	July 26	Padres	3 – 2 (10)	**Beimel** (1-5)	Burke (2-3)		20,747	30-68
99	July 27	@ Brewers	14 – 6	**Bergmann** (1-1)	Suppan (5-8)		37,311	31-68
100	July 28	@ Brewers	8 – 3	**Balester** (1-1)	Villanueva (2-8)		36,502	32-68
101	July 29	@ Brewers	7 – 5	Parra (5-8)	**Clippard** (1-1)	Hoffman (23)	32,992	32-69
102	July 30	@ Brewers	7 – 3	Gallardo (10-7)	**Martin** (0-2)		39,890	32-70
103	July 31	@ Pirates	5 – 4	Ohlendorf (9-8)	**Lannan** (7-8)	Capps (21)	23,363	32-71

August (14–15)

#	Date	Opponent	Score	Win	Loss	Save	Attendance	Record
104	August 1	@ Pirates	11 – 6	Vásquez (2-5)	**Stammen** (3-6)		26,855	32-72
105	August 2	@ Pirates	5 – 3	**Burnett** (2-2)	Maholm (6-6)	**MacDougal** (7)	21,894	33-72
106	August 3	@ Pirates	8 – 4	**Clippard** (2-1)	Morton (2-4)	**MacDougal** (8)	11,630	34-72
107	August 4	Marlins	6 – 4	**Villone** (4-5)	Calero (2-1)	**MacDougal** (9)	19,828	35-72
108	August 5	Marlins	5 – 4	**Lannan** (8-8)	van den Hurk (1-1)	**MacDougal** (10)	18,312	36-72
109	August 6	Marlins	12 – 8	**Sosa** (1-0)	Ayala (1-4)		23,691	37-72
110	August 7	Diamondbacks	7 – 6	**Bergmann** (2-1)	Gutiérrez (3-3)	**MacDougal** (11)	22,674	38-72
111	August 8	Diamondbacks	5 – 2	**Mock** (1-4)	Haren (11-7)	**Sosa** (1)	24,551	39-72
112	August 9	Diamondbacks	9 – 2	**Martin** (1-2)	Petit (2-6)	**Sosa** (2)	19,938	40-72
113	August 11	@ Braves	8 – 1	Hanson (7-2)	**Lannan** (8-9)		19,273	40-73
114	August 12	@ Braves	6 – 2	Lowe (12-7)	**Sosa** (1-1)		17,886	40-74
115	August 13	@ Reds	7 – 0	Arroyo (11-11)	**Balester** (1-2)		16,889	40-75
116	August 14	@ Reds	2 – 0	**Mock** (2-4)	Harang (6-14)	**MacDougal** (12)	19,606	41-75
117	August 15	@ Reds	10 – 6	**Martin** (2-2)	Cueto (8-10)		30,494	42-75
118	August 16	@ Reds	5 – 4	**Sosa** (2-1)	Rhodes (0-1)	**MacDougal** (13)	18,030	43-75
119	August 18	Rockies	4 – 3	Jiménez (11-9)	**Burnett** (2-3)	Street (30)	18,192	43-76
120	August 19	Rockies	5 – 4	Marquis (14-8)	**Balester** (1-3)	Street (31)	16,187	43-77
121	August 20	Rockies	4 – 1	Hammel (8-7)	**Mock** (2-5)	Street (32)	18,036	43-78
122	August 21	Brewers	7 – 3	Looper (11-6)	**Martin** (2-3)		26,307	43-79
123	August 22	Brewers	11 – 9	Narveson (1-0)	**Bergmann** (2-2)	Hoffman (27)	19,374	43-80
124	August 23	Brewers	8 – 3	**Stammen** (4-6)	Parra (8-10)		21,460	44-80
125	August 24	Brewers	7 – 1	Gallardo (12-10)	**Balester** (1-4)		17,805	44-81
126	August 25	@ Cubs	15 – 6	**Mock** (3-5)	Zambrano (7-5)		37,297	45-81
127	August 26	@ Cubs	9 – 4	Guzmán (3-3)	**Bergmann** (2-3)		36,562	45-82
128	August 27	@ Cubs	5 – 4	**Martin** (3-3)	Wells (9-7)	**MacDougal** (14)	35,174	46-82
129	August 28	@ Cardinals	3 – 2	Motte (4-4)	**Bergmann** (2-4)		40,033	46-83
130	August 29	@ Cardinals	9 – 4	Boggs (2-2)	**Stammen** (4-7)		44,028	46-84
131	August 30	@ Cardinals	2 – 1	Wainwright (16-7)	**Mock** (3-6)	Franklin (35)	41,083	46-85
132	August 31	@ Padres	3 – 1	Stauffer (3-6)	**Hernández** (7-9)	Bell (32)	19,867	46-86

September (9–17)

#	Date	Opponent	Score	Win	Loss	Save	Attendance	Record
133	September 1	@ Padres	4 – 1	Richard (8-4)	**Martin** (3-4)	Bell (33)	15,131	46-87
134	September 2	@ Padres	7 – 0	Correia (10-10)	**Lannan** (8-10)		14,468	46-88
135	September 4	Marlins	9 – 6	Badenhop (6-4)	**Mock** (3-7)	Oviedo (18)	16,364	46-89
136	September 5	Marlins	9 – 5	Johnson (14-4)	**Hernández** (7-10)		18,111	46-90
137	September 6	Marlins	5 – 4	**MacDougal** (1-0)	Oviedo (4-5)		22,325	47-90
138	September 8	Phillies	5 – 3	Martínez (4-0)	**Lannan** (8-11)	Madson (5)	17,153	47-91
139	September 9	Phillies	6 – 5	Lee (13-11)	**Clippard** (2-2)	Madson (6)	16,818	47-92
140	September 10	Phillies	8 – 7	**Hernández** (8-10)	Blanton (9-7)	**Villone** (1)	18,706	48-92
141	September 11	@ Marlins	5 – 3	**Martin** (4-4)	Sanches (4-2)	**MacDougal** (15)	15,247	49-92
142	September 12	@ Marlins	11 – 3	Wood (1-0)	**Estrada** (0-1)		38,214	49-93
143	September 13	@ Marlins	7 – 2	**Lannan** (9-11)	Volstad (9-12)		15,065	50-93
144	September 15	@ Phillies	5 – 0	Lee (14-11)	**Mock** (3-8)		44,521	50-94
145	September 16	@ Phillies	6 – 1	Blanton (10-7)	**Hernández** (8-11)		44,223	50-95
146	September 17	@ Phillies	4 – 2	Hamels (10-9)	**Detwiler** (0-6)	Lidge (30)	45,210	50-96
147	September 18	@ Mets	6 – 5	**Martin** (5-4)	Pelfrey (10-11)	**MacDougal** (16)	38,063	51-96
148	September 19	@ Mets	3 – 2	Redding (3-6)	**Lannan** (9-12)	Rodríguez (32)	37,906	51-97
149	September 20	@ Mets	6 – 2	Maine (6-5)	**Mock** (3-9)	Rodríguez (33)	38,347	51-98
150	September 22	Dodgers	14 – 2	Kuroda (8-6)	**Hernández** (8-12)		18,518	51-99
151	September 23	Dodgers	5 – 4	**Rivera** (1-3)	McDonald (5-5)		18,635	52-99
152	September 24	Dodgers	7 – 6	Troncoso (5-4)	**Villone** (4-6)	Broxton (36)	22,432	52-100
153	September 25	Braves	4 – 1	Vázquez (15-9)	**Lannan** (9-13)		28,276	52-101
154	September 26	Braves	11 – 5	Hanson (11-4)	**Mock** (3-10)		29,058	52-102
155	September 27	Braves	6 – 3 (10)	González (5-4)	**MacDougal** (1-1)	Soriano (27)	27,840	52-103
156	September 28	Mets	2 – 1	**Detwiler** (1-6)	Figueroa (2-8)	**MacDougal** (17)	18,600	53-103
157	September 29	Mets	4 – 3	**Clippard** (3-2)	Green (1-4)	**MacDougal** (18)	19,614	54-103
158	September 30	Mets	7 – 4	**Villone** (5-6)	Rodríguez (3-6)		23,944	55-103

October (4–0)

#	Date	Opponent	Score	Win	Loss	Save	Attendance	Record
159	October 1	@ Braves	2 – 1	**Clippard** (4-2)	Soriano (1-6)	**MacDougal** (19)	38,237	56-103
160	October 2	@ Braves	6 – 3	**Hernández** (9-12)	Lowe (15-10)	**MacDougal** (20)	33,124	57-103
161	October 3	@ Braves	6 – 4 (11)	**Segovia** (1-0)	Acosta (1-1)	**Kensing** (1)	28,278	58-103
162	October 4	@ Braves	2 – 1 (15)	**Kensing** (1-2)	Logan (1-1)		36,307	59-103

== Player stats ==
=== Batting ===
Note: Pos = Position; G = Games played; AB = At bats; R = Runs scored; H = Hits; 2B = Doubles; 3B = Triples; HR = Home runs; RBI = Runs batted in; AVG = Batting average; SB = Stolen bases

Pos	Player	G	AB	R	H	2B	3B	HR	RBI	AVG	SB
P	Collin Balester	7	8	0	1	0	0	0	0	.125	0
C	Josh Bard	90	274	20	63	18	0	6	31	.230	0
P	Joe Beimel	39	0	0	0	0	0	0	0	—	0
2B	Ronnie Belliard	86	187	26	46	7	1	5	22	.246	2
P	Jason Bergmann	55	2	0	0	0	0	0	0	.000	0
OF	Roger Bernadina	3	4	1	1	1	0	0	0	.250	0
C	Jamie Burke	6	10	0	1	0	0	0	1	.100	0
P	Sean Burnett	33	1	0	0	0	0	0	0	.000	0
P	Daniel Cabrera	9	11	0	0	0	0	0	0	.000	0
MI	Alex Cintrón	21	26	1	2	0	0	0	0	.077	0
P	Tyler Clippard	41	7	0	0	0	0	0	0	.000	0
P	Jesús Colomé	14	0	0	0	0	0	0	0	—	0
SS	Ian Desmond	21	82	9	23	7	2	4	12	.280	1
P	Ross Detwiler	13	19	1	1	0	0	0	1	.053	0
RF	Elijah Dukes	107	364	38	91	20	4	8	58	.250	3
UT	Adam Dunn	159	546	81	146	29	0	38	105	.267	0
P	Marco Estrada	4	0	0	0	0	0	0	0	—	0
C	Jesús Flores	29	93	13	28	3	2	4	15	.301	0
P	Víctor Gárate	4	0	0	0	0	0	0	0	—	0
MI	Alberto González	105	291	31	77	16	3	1	33	.265	1
SS	Cristian Guzmán	135	531	74	151	24	7	6	52	.284	4
P	Joel Hanrahan	32	0	0	0	0	0	0	0	—	0
CF	Willie Harris	137	323	47	76	18	6	7	27	.235	11
2B	Anderson Hernández	77	231	25	58	9	2	1	23	.251	5
P	Liván Hernández	8	14	1	3	2	0	0	0	.214	0
P	Mike Hinckley	14	1	0	0	0	0	0	0	.000	0
1B	Nick Johnson	98	353	47	104	16	2	6	44	.295	2
RF	Austin Kearns	80	174	20	34	6	2	3	17	.195	1
P	Logan Kensing	26	2	0	0	0	0	0	0	.000	0
P	John Lannan	31	58	1	9	1	0	0	0	.155	0
P	Wil Ledezma	5	0	0	0	0	0	0	0	—	0
P	Mike MacDougal	47	0	0	0	0	0	0	0	—	0
P	J.D. Martin	16	25	3	4	0	0	0	0	.160	0
P	Shairon Martis	13	24	4	5	1	0	0	2	.208	0
CF	Justin Maxwell	40	89	13	22	4	1	4	9	.247	6
CF	Lastings Milledge	7	24	1	4	0	0	0	1	.167	1
P	Garrett Mock	28	23	1	2	0	0	0	0	.087	0
CF	Nyjer Morgan	49	191	35	67	9	2	1	12	.351	24
UT	Michael Morse	32	52	4	13	3	0	3	10	.250	0
C	Wil Nieves	72	224	20	58	6	0	1	26	.259	1
P	Scott Olsen	11	15	1	2	0	0	0	1	.133	0
2B	Pete Orr	27	75	5	19	2	1	1	10	.253	2
OF	Jorge Padilla	29	25	3	3	0	0	0	0	.120	0
OF	Corey Patterson	5	15	0	2	0	0	0	0	.133	2
P	Saúl Rivera	30	3	2	1	0	0	0	0	.333	0
P	Zach Segovia	8	0	0	0	0	0	0	0	—	0
P	Steven Shell	4	0	0	0	0	0	0	0	—	0
P	Jorge Sosa	18	0	0	0	0	0	0	0	—	0
P	Craig Stammen	18	31	1	6	3	0	0	4	.194	0
P	Julián Tavárez	38	1	0	0	0	0	0	0	.000	0
P	Ron Villone	58	0	0	0	0	0	0	0	—	0
P	Kip Wells	23	0	0	0	0	0	0	0	—	0
LF	Josh Willingham	133	427	70	111	29	0	24	61	.260	4
P	Jordan Zimmermann	15	27	1	4	0	0	0	2	.148	0
3B	Ryan Zimmerman	157	610	110	178	37	3	33	106	.292	2
	Team totals	162	5493	710	1416	271	38	156	685	.258	73

=== Pitching ===
Table is sortable.

Note: Pos = Position; W = Wins; L = Losses; ERA = Earned run average; G = Games pitched; GS = Games started; SV = Saves; IP = Innings pitched; H = Hits allowed; R = Runs allowed; ER = Earned runs allowed; BB = Walks allowed; K = Strikeouts

Pos	Player	W	L	ERA	G	GS	SV	IP	H	R	ER	BB	K
	Collin Balester	1	4	6.82	7	7	0	30.1	34	24	23	14	20
RP	Joe Beimel	1	5	3.40	45	0	1	39.2	38	17	15	15	24
RP	Jason Bergmann	2	4	4.50	56	0	0	48.0	50	28	24	25	40
	Sean Burnett	1	1	3.20	33	0	0	25.1	14	9	9	13	20
	Daniel Cabrera	0	5	5.85	9	8	0	40.0	48	39	26	35	16
	Tyler Clippard	4	2	2.69	41	0	0	60.1	36	20	18	32	67
	Jesús Colomé	1	1	8.40	16	0	0	15.0	23	14	14	6	12
	Ross Detwiler	1	6	5.00	15	14	0	75.2	87	43	42	33	43
	Marco Estrada	0	1	6.14	4	1	0	7.1	6	6	5	4	9
	Víctor Gárate	0	0	22.50	4	0	0	2.0	5	5	5	3	0
	Joel Hanrahan	1	3	7.71	34	0	5	32.2	50	28	28	14	35
	Liván Hernández	2	4	5.36	8	8	0	48.2	56	29	29	16	27
	Mike Hinckley	0	0	4.66	14	0	0	9.2	8	5	5	11	3
	Logan Kensing	1	1	8.68	26	0	1	28.0	40	27	27	12	12
SP	John Lannan	9	13	3.88	33	33	0	206.0	210	100	89	68	89
	Wilfredo Ledezma	0	0	9.53	5	0	0	5.2	8	7	6	4	8
SP	J.D. Martin	5	4	4.44	15	15	0	77.0	85	40	38	24	37
SP	Shairon Martis	5	3	5.25	15	15	0	85.2	83	52	50	39	34
CL	Mike MacDougal	1	1	3.60	52	0	20	50.0	45	25	20	31	31
SP	Garrett Mock	3	10	5.62	28	15	0	91.1	114	65	57	44	72
	Scott Olsen	2	4	6.03	11	11	0	62.2	83	45	42	25	42
	Saúl Rivera	1	3	6.10	30	0	0	38.1	48	28	26	14	21
	Zach Segovia	1	0	7.84	8	0	0	10.1	11	10	9	6	4
	Steven Shell	0	0	5.40	4	0	0	5.0	5	3	3	2	5
	Jorge Sosa	2	1	6.45	18	0	2	22.1	28	16	16	12	17
SP	Craig Stammen	4	7	5.11	19	19	0	105.2	112	67	60	24	48
RP	Julián Tavárez	3	7	4.89	42	0	1	35.0	34	27	19	27	32
RP	Ron Villone	5	6	4.25	63	0	1	48.2	54	25	23	29	33
	Kip Wells	0	2	6.49	23	0	2	26.1	23	19	19	18	18
SP	Jordan Zimmermann	3	5	4.63	16	16	0	91.1	95	51	47	29	92
	Team totals	59	103	5.00	162	162	33	1424.1	1533	874	791	629	911

=== Team leaders ===
Qualifying players only.

==== Batting ====
Stat	Player	Total
Avg.	Ryan Zimmerman	.292
HR	Adam Dunn	38
RBI	Ryan Zimmerman	106
R	Ryan Zimmerman	110
H	Ryan Zimmerman	178
SB	Nyjer Morgan	24

==== Pitching ====
Stat	Player	Total
W	John Lannan	9
L	John Lannan	13
ERA	John Lannan	3.88
SO	Jordan Zimmermann	92
SV	Mike MacDougal	20
IP	John Lannan	206.1

== Awards and honors ==
=== All-Stars ===
- Ryan Zimmerman, 3B

=== Annual awards ===
- Gold Glove: Ryan Zimmerman, 3B
- Silver Slugger: Ryan Zimmerman, 3B

== Minor league system ==
The future for the Nationals seemed to show promise in 2009 with their Gulf Coast League affiliate qualifying for the playoffs. The significance of this to the 2009 Major League team was that it demonstrated that the team was attempting to improve on its performance and had the prospects to do so.

Class	Team	League	Manager	Record	Finish
AAA	Syracuse Chiefs	International League	Tim Foli	76–68 .528	2nd North Division
AA	Harrisburg Senators	Eastern League	John Stearns	70–72 .493	5th Southern Division
High A	Potomac Nationals	Carolina League	Trent Jewett	79–58 .577	2nd Northern Division
Low A	Hagerstown Suns	South Atlantic League	Matthew LeCroy	56–78 .418	8th Northern Division
Short Season A	Vermont Lake Monsters	New York–Penn League	Jeff Garber	34–41 .453	3rd Stedler Division
Rookie	Gulf Coast League Nationals	Gulf Coast League	Bob Henley	36–19 .655	2nd East Division, Won Wild Card, Lost GCL Finals 2–0 to Gulf Coast League Marlins
Rookie	DSL Nationals	Dominican Summer League	Juan Benhardt	29–42 .408	10th Boca Chica Division
