= Clint Everts =

American baseball player (born 1984)

- Pitcher
- Born: August 10, 1984 (age 41); Cypress, Texas, U.S.
- Bats: Switch Throws: Right
- Stats at Baseball Reference

Clinton Charles Everts (born August 10, 1984) is an American former professional baseball pitcher. He played Minor League Baseball from 2003 to 2013 and last pitched for the independent Sugar Land Skeeters in 2014.

== Career ==
Everts attended Cypress Falls High School, where he pitched alongside Scott Kazmir. He was drafted by the Montreal Expos in the first round (fifth overall) of the 2002 Major League Baseball draft. He was rated as a top-100 prospect by Baseball America prior to the 2003 and 2004 seasons. During his third season, he underwent Tommy John surgery.

Everts pitched in the Montreal Expos / Washington Nationals farm system until he signed with a major league contract with the New York Mets prior to the 2010 season. He was sent to Double-A prior to the start of the season, and was designated for assignment on April 11.

On June 26, 2010, Everts was traded to the Toronto Blue Jays to complete a previous trade which sent Jorge Padilla to New York Mets.

In 2013, Everts played in the Australian Baseball League, pitching for the Canberra Cavalry. He last played for the Sugar Land Skeeters from 2013 to 2014.

In May 2017, Everts was named the Interim Director of Baseball/Head Varsity Coach for the 2017/18 school year for St. John's School in Houston, Texas, in his third year on the school's coaching staff.
