= Joe Beimel =

American baseball player (born 1977)

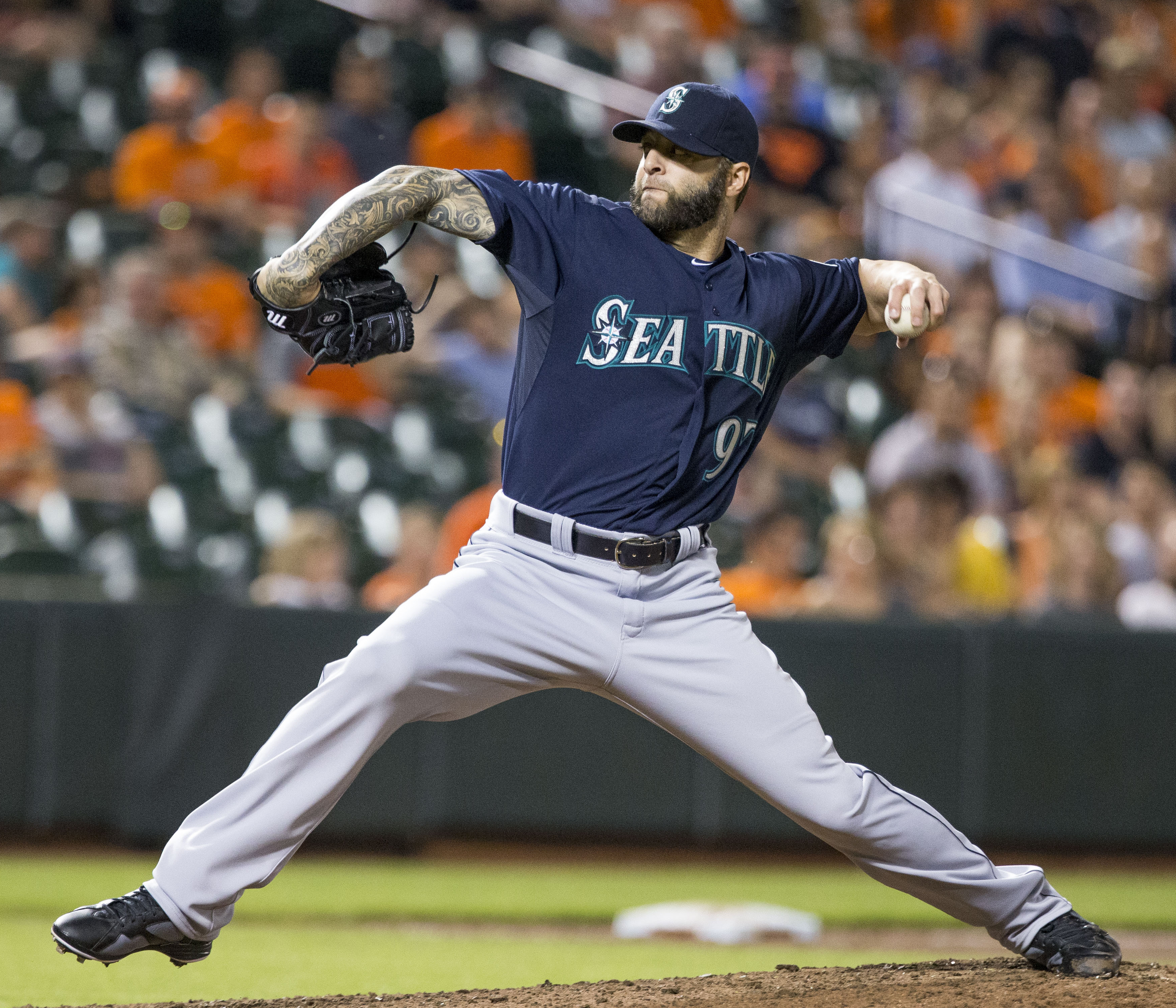
- Beimel with the Seattle Mariners in 2015
- Pitcher
- Born: April 19, 1977 (age 49); St. Marys, Pennsylvania, U.S.
- Batted: Left Threw: Left

MLB debut
- April 8, 2001, for the Pittsburgh Pirates

Last MLB appearance
- October 3, 2015, for the Seattle Mariners

MLB statistics
- Win–loss record: 29–34
- Earned run average: 4.06
- Strikeouts: 379
- Stats at Baseball Reference

Teams
- Pittsburgh Pirates (2001–2003); Minnesota Twins (2004); Tampa Bay Devil Rays (2005); Los Angeles Dodgers (2006–2008); Washington Nationals (2009); Colorado Rockies (2009–2010); Pittsburgh Pirates (2011); Seattle Mariners (2014–2015)

Joseph Ronald Beimel (pronounced "BUY mul") (born April 19, 1977) is an American former professional baseball pitcher. He played in Major League Baseball (MLB) for the Pittsburgh Pirates, Minnesota Twins, Tampa Bay Devil Rays, Los Angeles Dodgers, Washington Nationals, Seattle Mariners, and Colorado Rockies.

== Amateur career ==
Beimel attended St. Marys Area High School and was a letterman in football, wrestling, basketball, and baseball. He played two seasons of junior college baseball at Allegany College of Maryland in Cumberland, Maryland and one season at Duquesne University in Pittsburgh. Six former Allegany College players have made it to Major League Baseball. Beimel was the fifth Major League Baseball player to come out of the Allegany College of Maryland program. The five other Allegany Trojans to make the big leagues were John Kruk, Stan Belinda, Steve Kline, Scott Seabol and Scott Patterson. At Allegany, Beimel played for Junior College Hall of Fame Coach Steve Bazarnic. During Beimel's years at Allegany the Trojans advanced to the Junior College World Series both seasons. At Duquesne University he was the team leader in wins and complete games and was second on the staff in strikeouts and ERA.

== Professional career ==
=== Pittsburgh Pirates ===
Beimel was drafted by the Texas Rangers in the 26th round of the 1996 Draft after his freshman year in college but chose to remain in school. He was later selected in the 18th round of the 1998 Major League Baseball draft by the Pittsburgh Pirates, after his junior year, and signed with the Pirates on June 5, 1998. Beimel is the first pitcher drafted by the Pirates out of the Pittsburgh-based Duquesne University; he is the only such pitcher to have made it to the Major Leagues.

Beimel's minor league stops in the Pirates organization included their development level Erie SeaWolves (1998, 1–4, 6.32, 6 starts), the Single-A Hickory Crawdads (1999, 5–11, 4.43, 22 starts), the High-A Lynchburg Hillcats (2000, 10–6, 3.36, 18 starts, 2 complete games), and the Double-A Altoona Curve (1-6, 4.16, 10 starts, 1 complete game).

After a strong spring, Beimel made the Pirates' major league roster at the start of the 2001 season. He made his major league debut as the starting pitcher on April 8, 2001, against the Houston Astros, pitching five innings, allowing two runs, and recording his first career victory. Beimel appeared as both a starter and a reliever that season, finishing with a record of 7–11, ERA of 5.23 in 42 appearances, 15 of them as a starter.

Beimel made another eight starts on the 2002 squad but was primarily used as a relief pitcher thereafter. After finishing both the 2002 and 2003 seasons in the Pirates bullpen as an average middle reliever, the Pirates released him before the start of the 2004 season.

=== Minnesota Twins ===
Beimel was subsequently signed as a free agent by the Minnesota Twins on April 11, 2004. He spent the bulk of the season with Minnesota's Triple-A affiliate, the Rochester Red Wings, where he had a mediocre season (2-4, 6.97, in 49 appearances). Beimel made just three relief appearances for the Twins as a September call-up and then was released after the season.

=== Tampa Bay Devil Rays ===
Beimel was signed as a free agent by the Tampa Bay Devil Rays on November 5, 2004, and spent most of the 2005 season with their Triple-A affiliate, the Durham Bulls, going 1–2 with a 3.93 ERA in 48 games. He made several trips to the big leagues to pitch for the Devil Rays during the season, making seven appearances with an ERA of 3.27.

=== Los Angeles Dodgers ===
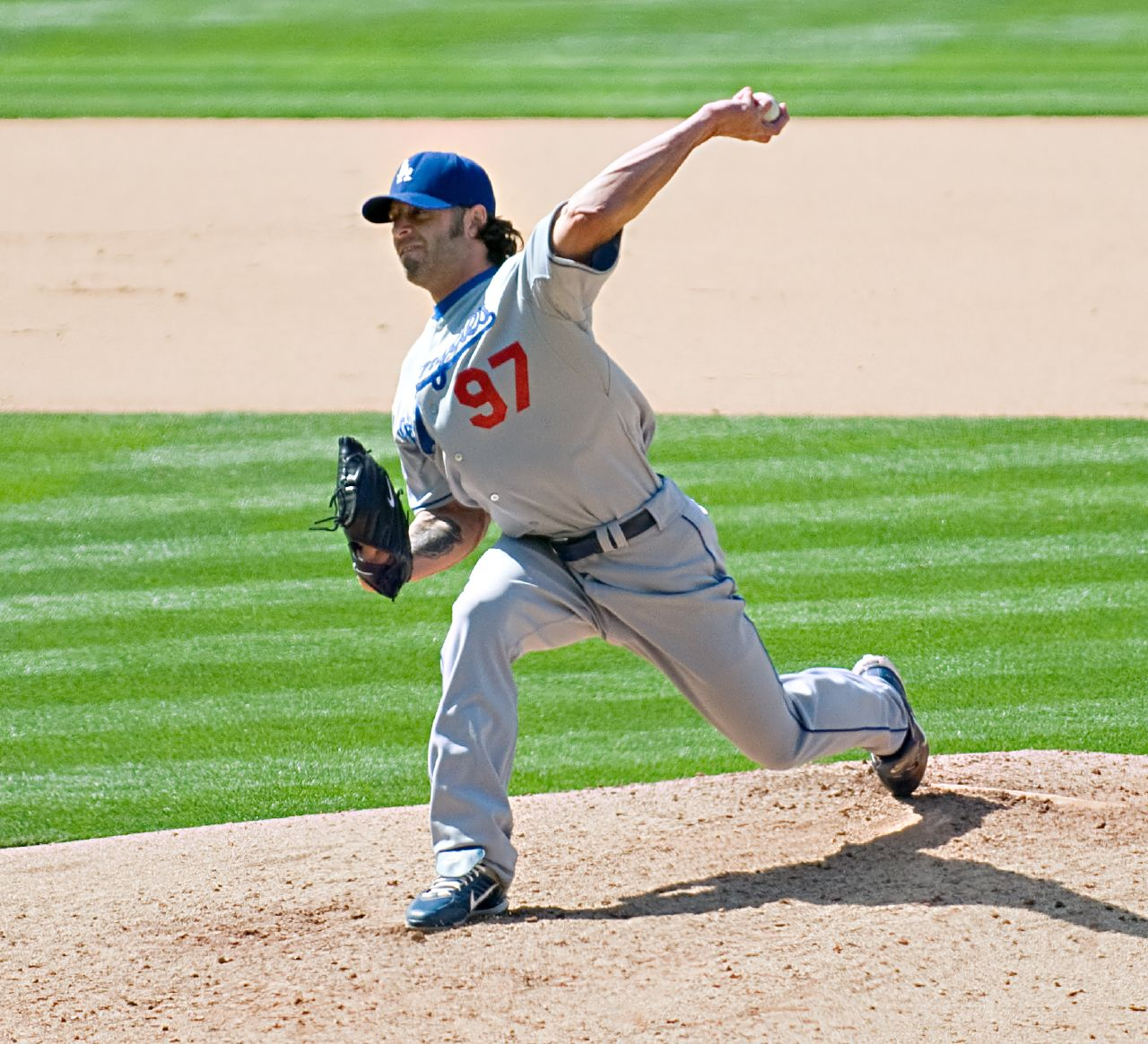
Beimel during his tenure with the Los Angeles Dodgers in 2008

In 2006, Beimel was signed by the Los Angeles Dodgers and became a valuable member of their relief corps, with a 2.96 ERA in 62 appearances, primarily as a late inning left-handed specialist. However, he was also effective enough against right-handed batters to be used as both a set-up man and emergency closer, and proved remarkably effective when put into games to work the Dodgers out of jams. Beimel wore #97 for the Dodgers, which at the time was the highest number ever used by a Dodger, and he remains the only player in MLB history to wear the number. The number represents the year of his first child's birth.

His successful season ended on a down note; right before 2006 divisional series between the Dodgers and New York Mets began, Beimel cut his hand on glass at a bar in New York. Due to his injury, Beimel was left off the series roster. At first he claimed that it happened in his hotel room before divulging the truth after the Dodgers lost to the Mets three games to none. Beimel was completely sober for 15 months following the incident and now drinks only occasionally.

During the 2007 season, Beimel set a record for the Dodgers by making 83 appearances, the most by a left-handed pitcher in the Dodgers' history.

During his first two years with the Dodgers, Beimel became known for his ability to get Barry Bonds out. Beimel held Bonds to 1–16 at the plate, with the one hit being a solo home run. He also walked Bonds only three times.

After the arrival of new manager Joe Torre, Beimel was forced to cut his hair, a situation similar to one Stump Merrill had with Torre's successor as Dodger manager, Don Mattingly, when Merrill managed Mattingly with the New York Yankees.

==== Relationship with fans ====
Joe gained a cult following in 2008 in a series of fan-made YouTube videos. When the Dodgers conducted their second annual online fan vote during Spring Training to determine what player should be immortalized as part of the team's bobblehead promotions, Beimel took home the honors for 2008 after a strong Internet turnout, including a campaign that was orchestrated by his parents, Ron and Marge Beimel.

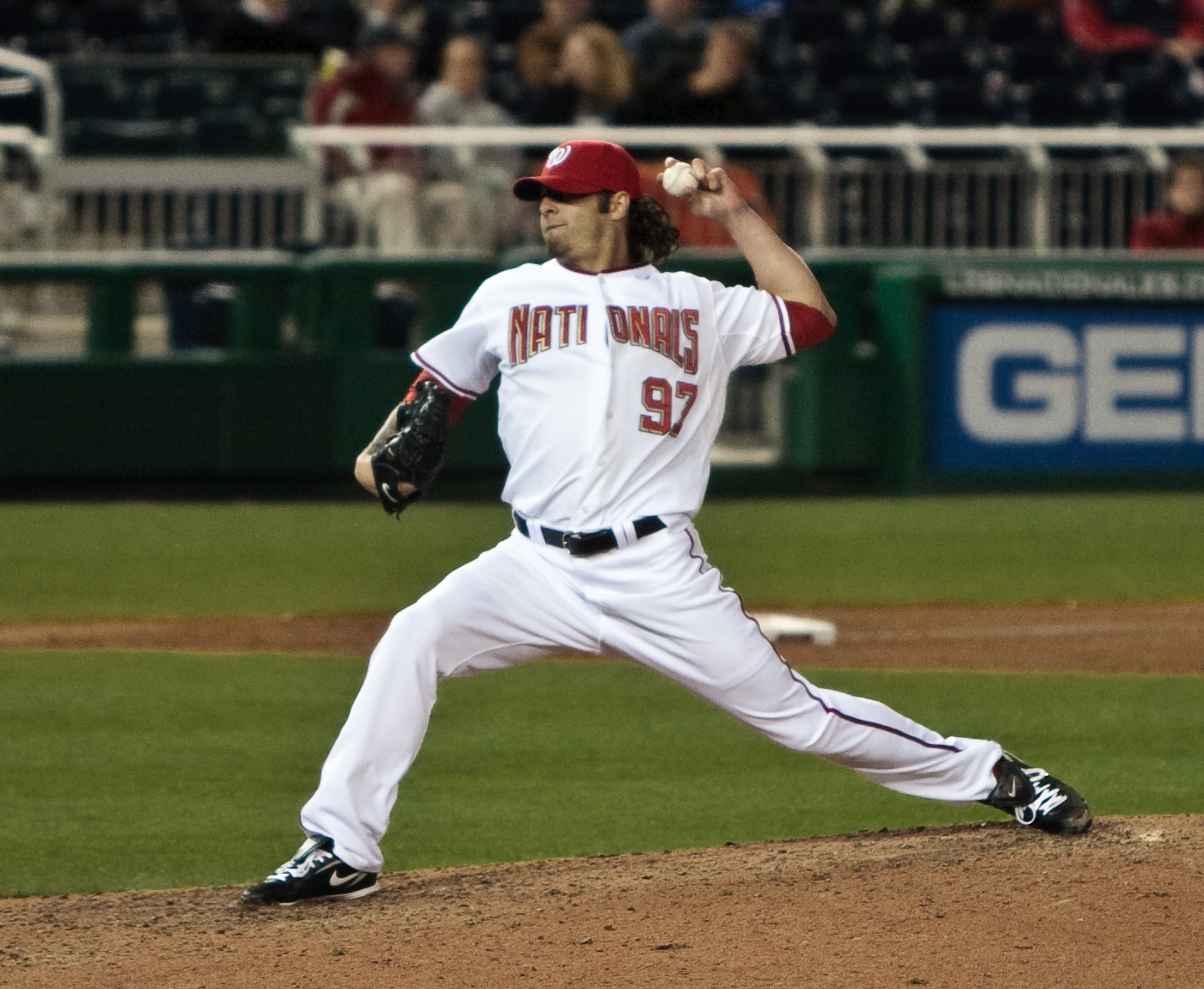
Beimel pitching for the Washington Nationals in 2009

=== Washington Nationals ===
On March 18, 2009, Beimel and the Washington Nationals agreed to a one-year $2 million deal; he became their eighth-inning set up man.

=== Colorado Rockies ===
On July 31, 2009, Beimel was traded by the Nationals to the Colorado Rockies in exchange for Ryan Mattheus and Robinson Fabian.

On March 22, 2010, Beimel re-signed with the Rockies organization on a minor league contract, and was brought up to the majors on April 15.

His entrance song was "God's Gonna Cut You Down" by Johnny Cash.

=== Pittsburgh Pirates (second stint) ===
On January 27, 2011, the Pittsburgh Pirates signed Beimel to a minor league contract. He began the season on the disabled list due to soreness in his forearm and elbow, which he initially experienced during spring training. Beimel spent the first weeks of season on rehab assignments with the Advance-A Bradenton Marauders and Triple-A Indianapolis Indians. The Pirates activated Beimel from the disabled list on April 15. On May 28, Beimel was placed on the 15-day disabled list, due to the same injury which had put him on the shelf to begin the season. Daniel Moskos was recalled to take his place. He was designated for assignment on August 23, and released a week later.

=== Texas Rangers ===
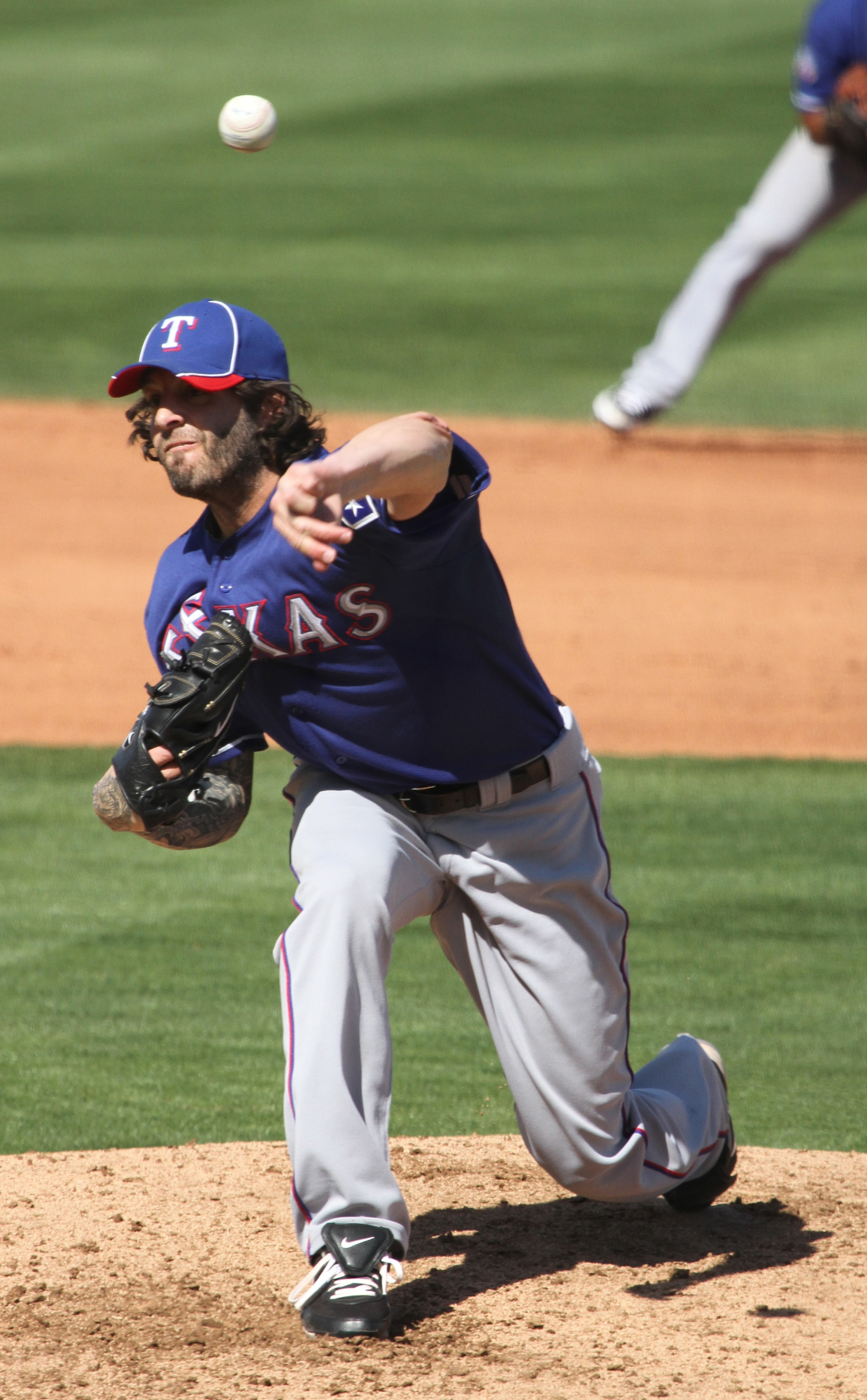
Beimel in 2012 spring training with the Texas Rangers

On February 6, 2012, Beimel signed a minor league deal with the Texas Rangers. He was released by the Rangers prior to the start of the season on March 26. Beimel underwent Tommy John surgery on May 1, ruling him out for the season.

=== Seattle Mariners ===
Beimel signed a minor league contract with the Seattle Mariners on January 24, 2014. In his first appearance with Seattle, Beimel recorded an out without throwing a pitch, picking David Freese off of first base. He enjoyed a successful 2014 campaign, posting a 2.20 ERA in 56 relief appearances.

Beimel signed a $600,000 contract with the Texas Rangers on March 6, 2015. He struggled through spring training, allowing 11 earned runs in three innings pitched. On March 23, Beimel was released. Had he been promoted to the major league level, Beimel's salary would have risen to $1.5 million. Instead, he was paid $147,541.

Beimel signed a minor league contract to return to the Mariners organization on April 2, 2015. On May 4, the Mariners selected Beimel's contract, adding him to their active roster. In 53 appearances for Seattle, he compiled a 3.99 ERA with 22 strikeouts across 47 1/3 innings pitched.

On May 12, 2015, Beimel agreed to a minor league contract with the Miami Marlins organization. However, on May 17 it was reported that Miami had "decided to pass" on the deal, leaving Beimel in free agency.

=== Kansas City Royals ===
Beimel signed a minor league contract with the Kansas City Royals on June 6, 2016. In 12 games for the Triple-A Omaha Storm Chasers, he posted a 4.30 ERA with 6 strikeouts across 14 2/3 innings pitched. Beimel was released by the Royals organization on July 15.

=== New Britain Bees ===
On March 22, 2017, Beimel signed with the New Britain Bees of the Atlantic League of Professional Baseball. Beimel announced his retirement from professional baseball on June 25, after appearing in 22 games for the Bees.

=== San Diego Padres ===
On June 11, 2021, Beimel made his comeback to organized baseball at the age of 44 after signing a minor league contract with the San Diego Padres organization. In 31 appearances split between the Double-A San Antonio Missions and Triple-A El Paso Chihuahuas, he accumulated a 1-2 record and 3.86 ERA with 25 strikeouts and 2 saves over 35 innings of work. Beimel elected free agency following the season on November 7.

== Personal life ==
Beimel is a Democrat. He has two children with his first wife Emily, and one child with his second wife Carley. He wears #97 to represent the year of his first child Drew's birth.
