= Garrett Mock =

American baseball player (born 1983)

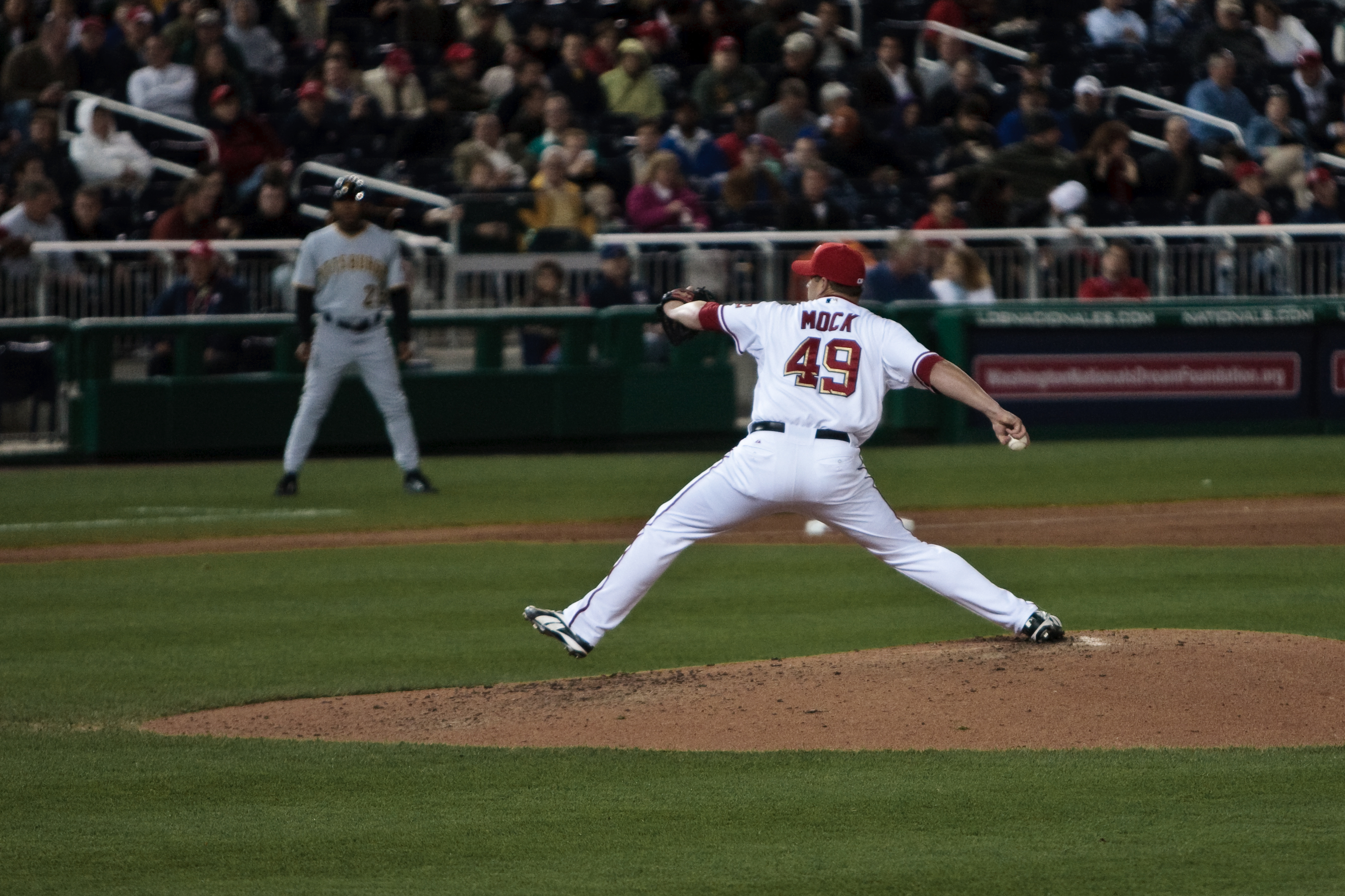
- Mock with the Washington Nationals
- Pitcher
- Born: April 25, 1983 (age 43); Houston, Texas, U.S.
- Batted: Right Threw: Right

MLB debut
- June 8, 2008, for the Washington Nationals

Last MLB appearance
- April 9, 2010, for the Washington Nationals

MLB statistics
- win–loss record: 4–13
- Earned run average: 5.17
- Strikeouts: 121
- Stats at Baseball Reference

Teams
- Washington Nationals (2008–2010)

Garrett Lee Mock (born April 25, 1983 in Houston, Texas) is an American former professional baseball pitcher. He played in Major League Baseball (MLB) for the Washington Nationals.

== Career ==
=== Amateur career ===
Mock attended the University of Houston where he played as part of the Houston Cougars baseball team. In 2003, he played collegiate summer baseball in the Cape Cod Baseball League for the Yarmouth-Dennis Red Sox, where he was named the Eastern division MVP of the league's annual all-star game.

=== Arizona Diamondbacks ===
He was the first of his UH class to be selected in the 2004 amateur draft, being chosen by Arizona Diamondbacks in the third round.

Mock began the 2006 season pitching for the Tennessee Smokies of the Double-A Southern League, where he accrued a 4–8 win–loss record and 4.95 earned run average (ERA) in 23 starts.

=== Washington Nationals ===
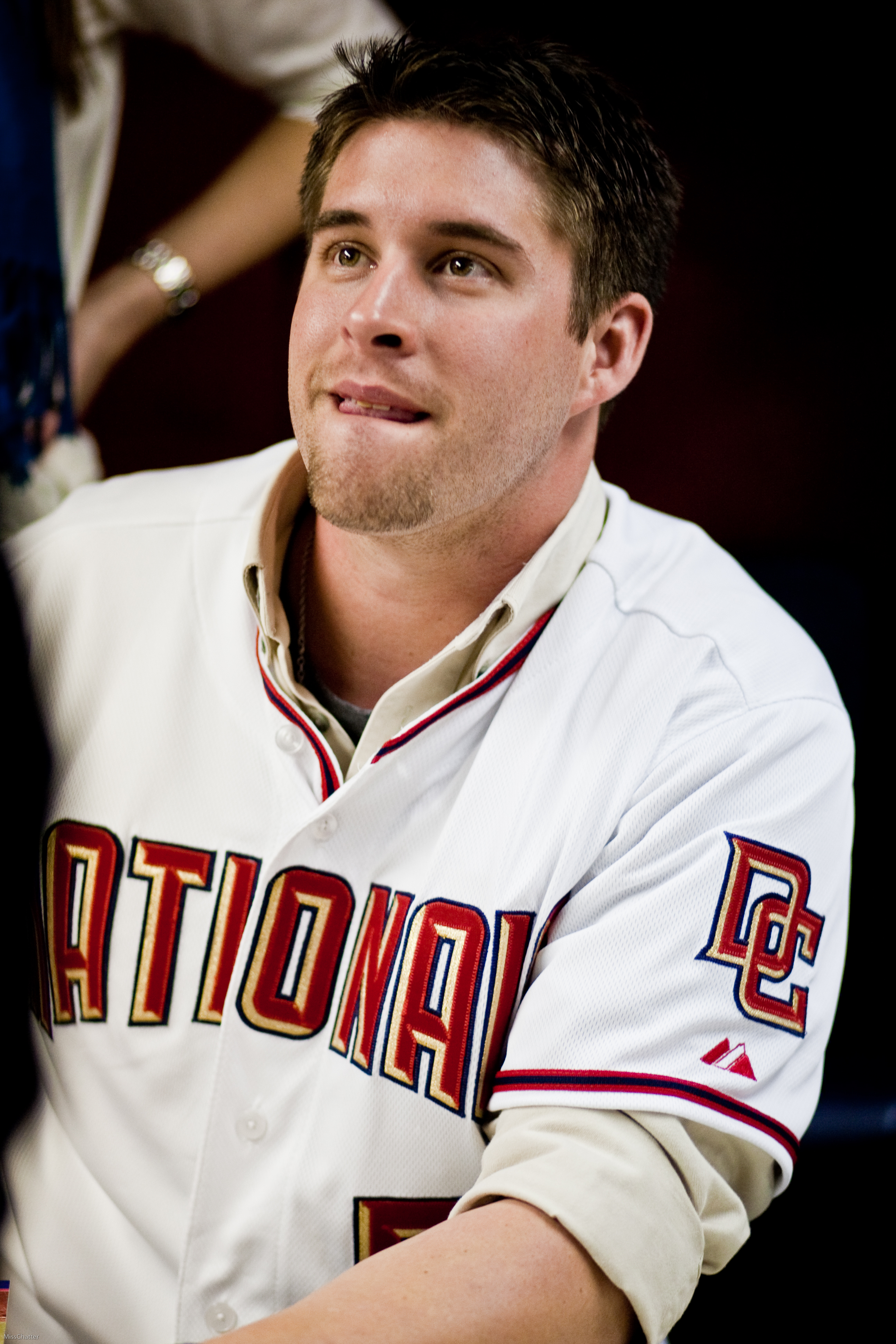
Mock with the Washington Nationals

On August 7, 2006, Mock was acquired by the Nationals along with fellow minor league pitcher Matt Chico in a trade for veteran right-handed pitcher Liván Hernández. After joining the Nationals organization, he pitched for the Harrisburg Senators of the Double-A Eastern League, compiling a 10.26 ERA in his first 4 starts, all losses. His 2006 season ended September 2, after undergoing surgery to repair a tear in the patella tendon of his knee.

In 2007, Mock posted a win–loss record of 2–7 and an ERA of 5.12 in 15 appearances for the High Single-A Potomac Nationals, Rookie-Level Gulf Coast Nationals and Double-A Harrisburg Senators. During the 2007–2008 off-season, Mock pitched for the Peoria Javelinas of the Arizona Fall League. On October 23, 2007, Mock was added to the Nationals 40-man roster.

In 2008, after starting the year with the Triple-A Columbus Clippers, Mock made his major league debut on June 8, giving up four earned runs in 4 1/3 innings. Mock was selected for the International League roster at the 2008 Triple-A All-Star Game. On August 7, Mock was recalled by the Nationals from Columbus. He would spend most of the rest of the season as a relief pitcher including a 1.93 ERA in the month of September.

Mock had neck surgery in 2010 and was out most of the season.

He was designated for assignment on September 6, 2011, he cleared waivers and was sent outright to Triple-A Syracuse Chiefs on September 13. He became a free agent following the season on November 2.

=== Toronto Blue Jays ===
On November 23, 2011, Mock signed a minor league contract with the Toronto Blue Jays. He was released on February 17, 2012.

=== Boston Red Sox ===
On March 2, 2012, Mock signed a minor league contract with the Boston Red Sox.

=== Houston Astros ===
On August 3, 2012, Mock was traded to the Houston Astros for future considerations. Mock was 3–2 with a 3.33 ERA and 5 saves in 35 appearances over 48 2/3 innings with Triple-A Pawtucket before the trade. Mock pitched in 12 games with Triple-A Oklahoma City, striking out 15 over 13 innings. He became a free agent following the season on November 2.

=== Arizona Diamondbacks (second stint) ===
On November 7, 2012, Mock signed a minor-league deal with the Arizona Diamondbacks with an invitation to spring training. He was released on August 18, 2013.

== International ==
After the 2013 season, he went to training camp for the Saitama Seibu Lions but never played for the team.
