= Jorge Padilla (baseball) =

Puerto Rican baseball player (born 1979)

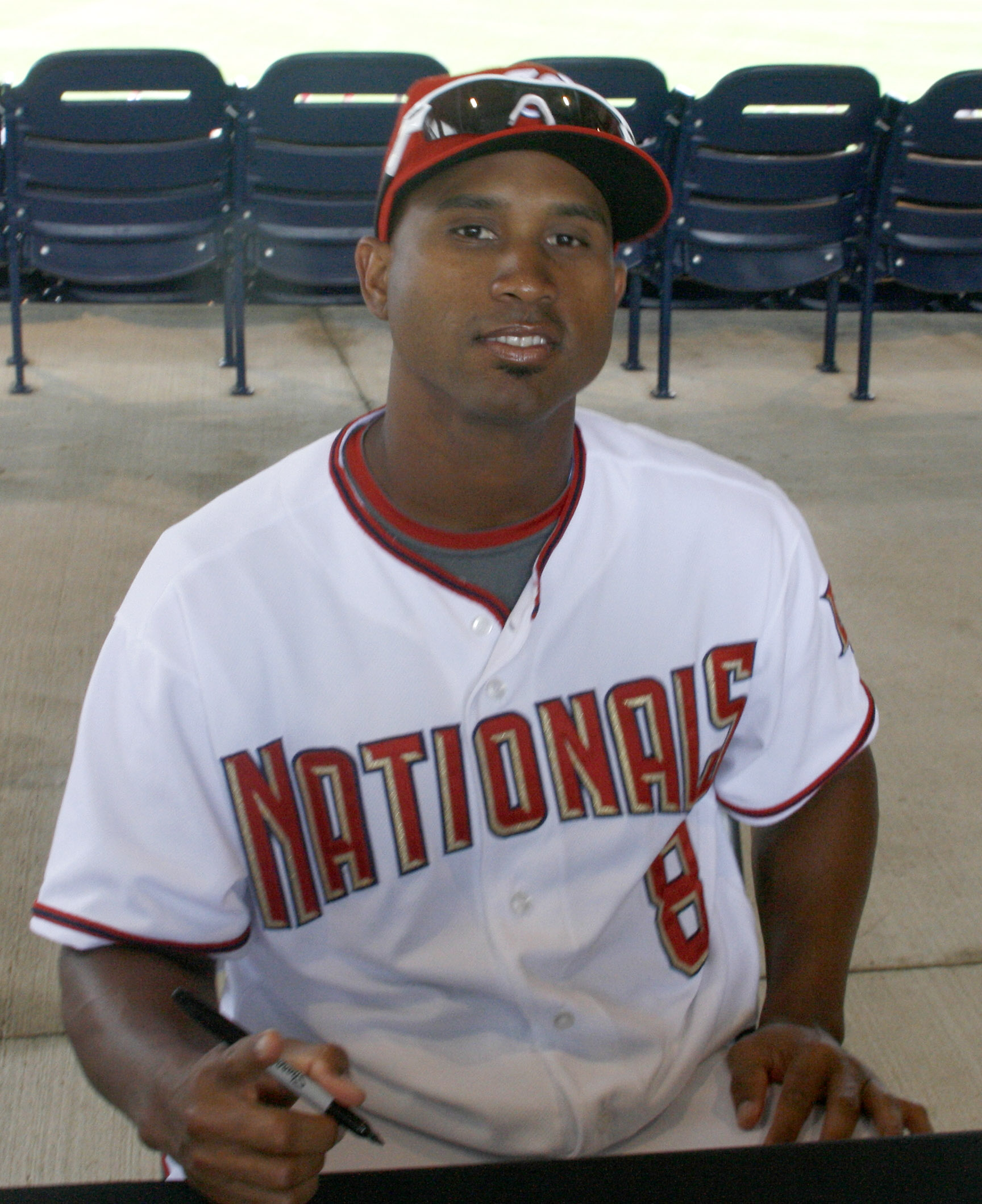
- Padilla with the Washington Nationals
- Outfielder
- Born: August 11, 1979 (age 47); Río Piedras, Puerto Rico
- Batted: Right Threw: Right

MLB debut
- August 5, 2009, for the Washington Nationals

Last MLB appearance
- October 4, 2009, for the Washington Nationals

MLB statistics
- Batting average: .120
- Home runs: 0
- Runs batted in: 0
- Stats at Baseball Reference

Teams
- Washington Nationals (2009)
Medals
Men's baseball
Representing Puerto Rico
Pan American Games
Gold medal – first place	2019 Lima	Team

Jorge Rafael Padilla (born August 11, 1979) is a Puerto Rican former professional baseball outfielder. He played in Major League Baseball (MLB) for the Washington Nationals in 2009.

== Professional career ==
=== Philadelphia Phillies ===
==== Minor leagues ====
Padilla was selected by the Philadelphia Phillies in the third round of the 1998 Major League Baseball draft. He soon made his debut with the Rookie-level Martinsville Phillies. He batted.356 with five home runs and 25 RBI in 23 games.

In 1999 Padilla split his season between the Single-A Piedmont Boll Weevils, where in 44 games he hit.208 with three home runs and 17 RBI. He also played for the Low-A Batavia Muckdogs, where in 65 games he hit.252 with three home runs and 30 RBI.

With the Single-A Clearwater Phillies, Padilla ranked ninth in the South Atlantic League in batting with a .305 average. He also had 11 home runs and 67 RBI in 108 games in 2000.

Padilla spent the entire 2001 season with High-A Clearwater, hitting .260 with 16 home runs, 66 RBI, and 23 stolen bases in 100 games.

In 2002 Padilla was promoted for the Double-A Reading Phillies. He hit .256 with seven home runs, 65 RBI, and 32 stolen bases across 127 appearances. Playing for Double-A Reading again in 2003, Padilla batted .295 with two home runs and 23 RBI. He suffered a hand injury in late June, which required season-ending surgery.

With the Triple-A Scranton-Wilkes Barre Red Barons Padilla batted .253 with seven home runs and 45 RBI over 117 contests in 2004.

Padilla started the 2005 season with Clearwater after missing two months with an injury. He soon rejoined Triple-A Scranton-Wilkes Barre. He got off to a great start hitting .317 in his first 19 games but fell apart in his final 30 games batted .223.

=== New York Mets ===
In 2006, Padilla spent the entire year with the Double-A Binghamton Mets, marking his first season in the New York Mets organization. He hit .295 with 10 home runs and 54 RBI in 129 games. Padilla finished fourth in the Eastern League in hitting and third in hits with 142. He was selected for the Eastern League All-Star team.

Padilla spent the 2007 season with the Double-A Wichita Wranglers in the Kansas City Royals organization. He hit .336 with 10 home runs, 51 runs scored, and 49 RBI across 69 games, and was quickly promoted to the Triple-A Omaha Royals, where he hit .291 with six home runs, 27 runs scored, and 20 RBI over 55 games.

=== Washington Nationals ===
Padilla hit .330 with one home run, 25 runs scored, and 14 RBI in 33 games with the Double-A Harrisburg Senators in 2008. This marked his first season in the Washington Nationals organization.

He started the 2009 season with the Syracuse Chiefs.

==== Major leagues ====
Padilla was first called up to the major leagues for the first time on August 5, 2009. He was called up to the Nationals after right fielder Austin Kearns was placed on the disabled list with a right thumb contusion. Padilla earned the promotion after hitting .367 with four home runs and 21 RBI for Triple-A Syracuse. The right-handed hitter stated his reason for his high batting average was his ability to hit the ball to the opposite field. On August 22, Padilla got his first start in left field for the Nationals.

=== Toronto Blue Jays ===
On January 13, 2010, Padilla signed a minor league contract with the Toronto Blue Jays. Padilla made 50 appearances for the Triple-A Las Vegas 51s, slashing .330/.405/.459 with four home runs, 27 RBI, and seven stolen bases.

=== New York Mets ===
On June 18, 2010, Padilla was traded to the New York Mets in exchange for Clint Everts. He made 48 appearances for the Triple-A Buffalo Bisons, hitting .313/.365/.413 with two home runs, 22 RBI, and six stolen bases. On November 10, Padilla became a minor league free agent.

=== Florida Marlins ===
On January 19, 2011, Padilla signed a minor league contract with the Florida Marlins organization. He made 101 appearances split between the Double-A Jacksonville Suns and Triple-A New Orleans Zephyrs, batting a combined .303/.381/.398 with five home runs, 38 RBI, and 11 stolen bases.

=== Broncos de Reynosa ===
On April 22, 2012, Padilla signed with the Broncos de Reynosa of the Mexican League. In 29 appearances for Reynosa, Padilla batted .290/.369/.355 with one home run, nine RBI, and seven stolen bases.

=== San Diego Padres ===
On May 30, 2012, Padilla signed a minor league contract with the San Diego Padres. He made 17 appearances for the Triple-A Tucson Padres, going 9-for-41 (.220) with three RBI and five walks. Padilla was released by the Padres organization on July 3.

== Personal life ==
Padilla was once married to Sheila Gonzalez. Padilla is a 1998 graduate of Florida Air Academy in Melbourne, Florida. He was first-team All-State in baseball in 1997–98, Player of the Year, and a 3rd team ABCA all-American in his senior year.

== See also ==
- List of Major League Baseball players from Puerto Rico
