= Jesús Flores =

Venezuelan baseball player (born 1984)

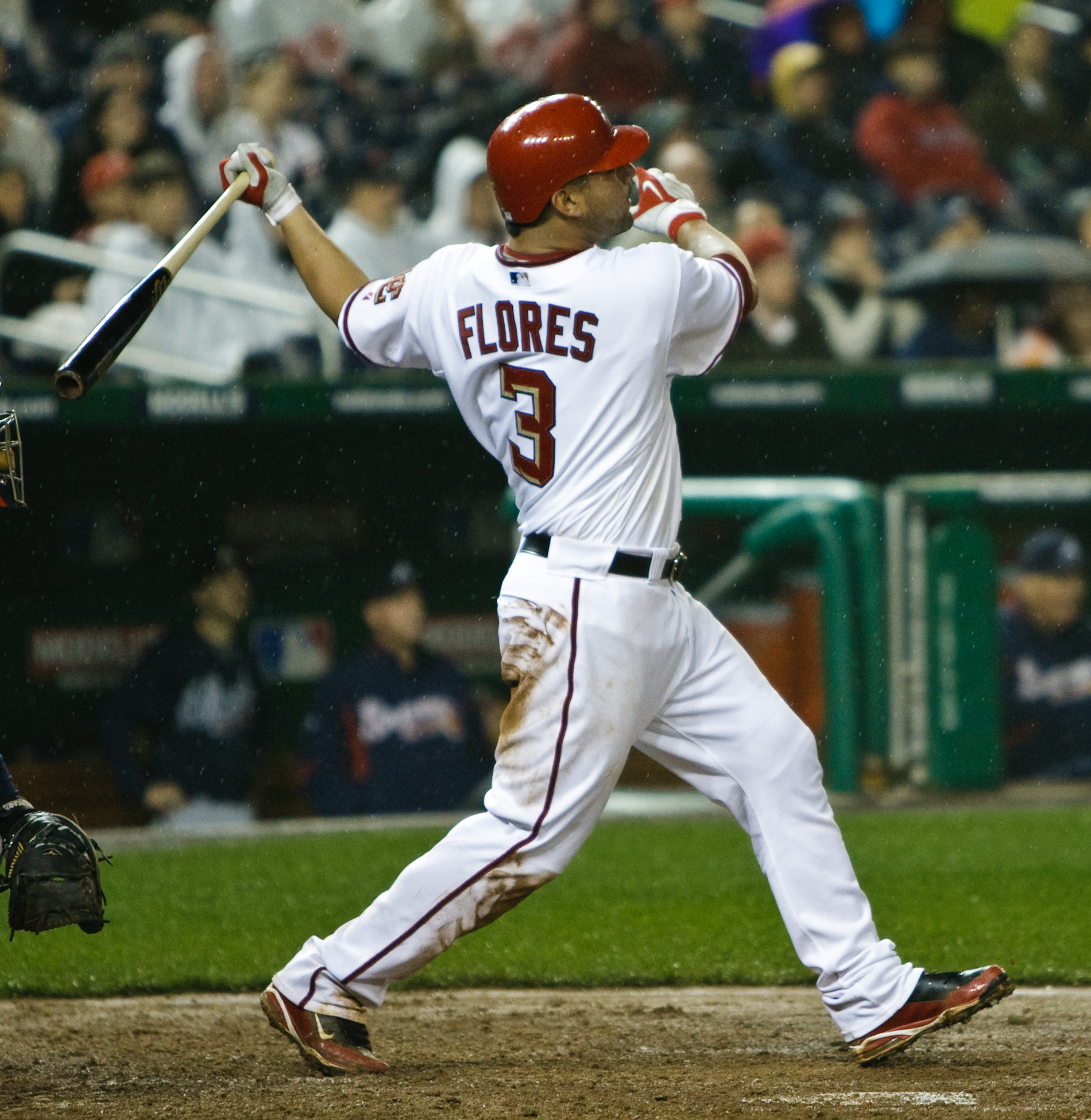
- Flores with the Washington Nationals in 2009
- Catcher
- Born: October 26, 1984 (age 41); Sucre, Venezuela
- Batted: Right Threw: Right

MLB debut
- April 4, 2007, for the Washington Nationals

Last MLB appearance
- October 3, 2012, for the Washington Nationals

MLB statistics
- Batting average: .241
- Home runs: 23
- Runs batted in: 127
- Stats at Baseball Reference

Teams
- Washington Nationals (2007–2009, 2011–2012)

Jesús Miguel Flores (born October 26, 1984) is a Venezuelan former professional baseball catcher. He previously played in Major League Baseball with the Washington Nationals.

== Professional career ==
=== New York Mets ===
Flores was signed by the New York Mets as an amateur free agent on March 12, 2002. In parts of three minor league seasons, Flores hit .257 (230-for-895) with 33 home runs and 140 RBI in 250 games played. In 2004, he made the Gulf Coast League All-Star team.

In 2006, he had a terrific minor league season with the Mets' A+ team, St. Lucie. By the end of the season, he was rated by Baseball America as the Mets top catching prospect after hitting .266 with a .335 on-base percentage and a .487 slugging average. He also hit 32 doubles and tied for the Florida State League lead with 21 home runs, making the Florida State League Mid-Season and Post-Season All-Star teams.

=== Washington Nationals ===
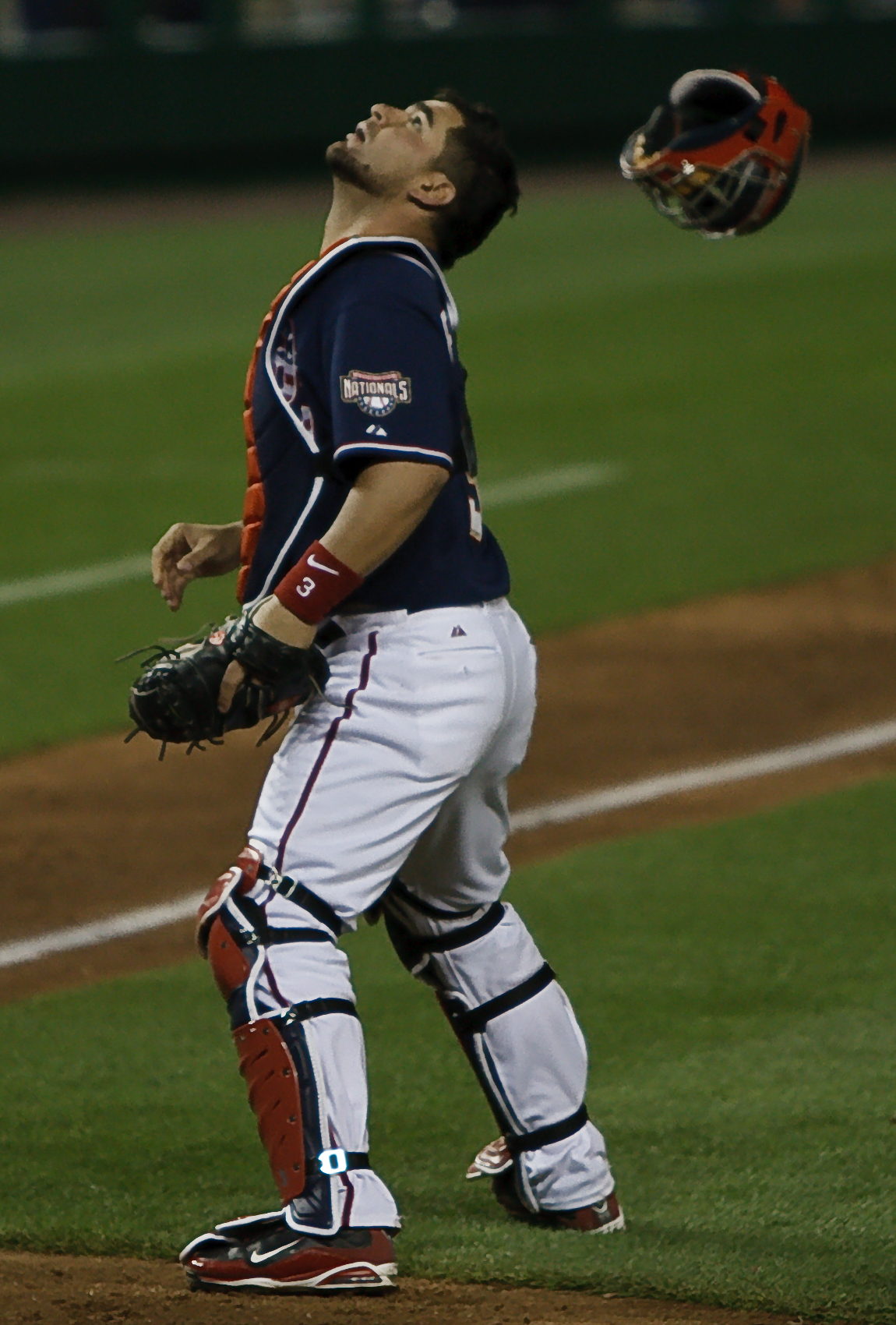
Flores fielding a pop fly on April 16, 2009.

Flores, never having played above A-ball, was obtained by the Washington Nationals in the 2006 Rule 5 draft on December 7, 2006.

His major league debut with Washington was on April 4, 2007, and his first start on April 19. Three days later, on April 19, he made his second start, and collected his first hits: he went 2-for-3 with a walk, two doubles and two RBIs. On September 4, 2007, Flores hit a 2 RBI, walk-off single to beat the Florida Marlins.

During the 2007–08 offseason, he played for Navegantes del Magallanes in the Venezuelan Professional Baseball League.

As the 2008 season opened, Flores was the starting catcher for the Nationals. His season would be over on September 3, 2008 after being injured on a collision with Chase Utley when Utley attempted to steal home.

On July 20, 2008, Flores collected five hits, all singles, in a 15–6 Nationals victory over the Atlanta Braves.

After 26 games in 2009, Flores was placed on the disabled list with a stress fracture in his shoulder. General Manager Mike Rizzo indicated that he would be out a minimum of three months, and possibly for the rest of the season. He wound up missing the entire 2010 season due to the injury and returned to play 30 games in 2011 and 83 games in 2012.

=== Los Angeles Dodgers ===
On January 16, 2013, Flores and the Los Angeles Dodgers agreed to a minor league deal with an invite to spring training. The Dodgers assigned him to the AAA Albuquerque Isotopes. In 22 games for the Isotopes, he hit only .164. He was released on May 23.

=== Tampa Bay Rays ===
On June 4, 2013, Flores signed a minor league contract with the Tampa Bay Rays. He elected free agency on November 4.

=== Kansas City Royals ===
On March 2, 2014, Flores signed a minor league contract with the Kansas City Royals. He was released on July 23.

=== Atlanta Braves ===
On January 30, 2015, Flores signed a minor league deal with the Atlanta Braves, that included an invitation to spring training. He was released on April 3.

=== Miami Marlins ===
On April 29, 2015, Flores signed a minor league contract with the Miami Marlins. He was released on July 18.

== Team Venezuela ==
In the 2017 World Baseball Classic, he joined Team Venezuela due to Salvador Perez sustaining an injury.

== See also ==
- List of Major League Baseball players from Venezuela
