= Liván Hernández =

Cuban baseball player (born 1975)

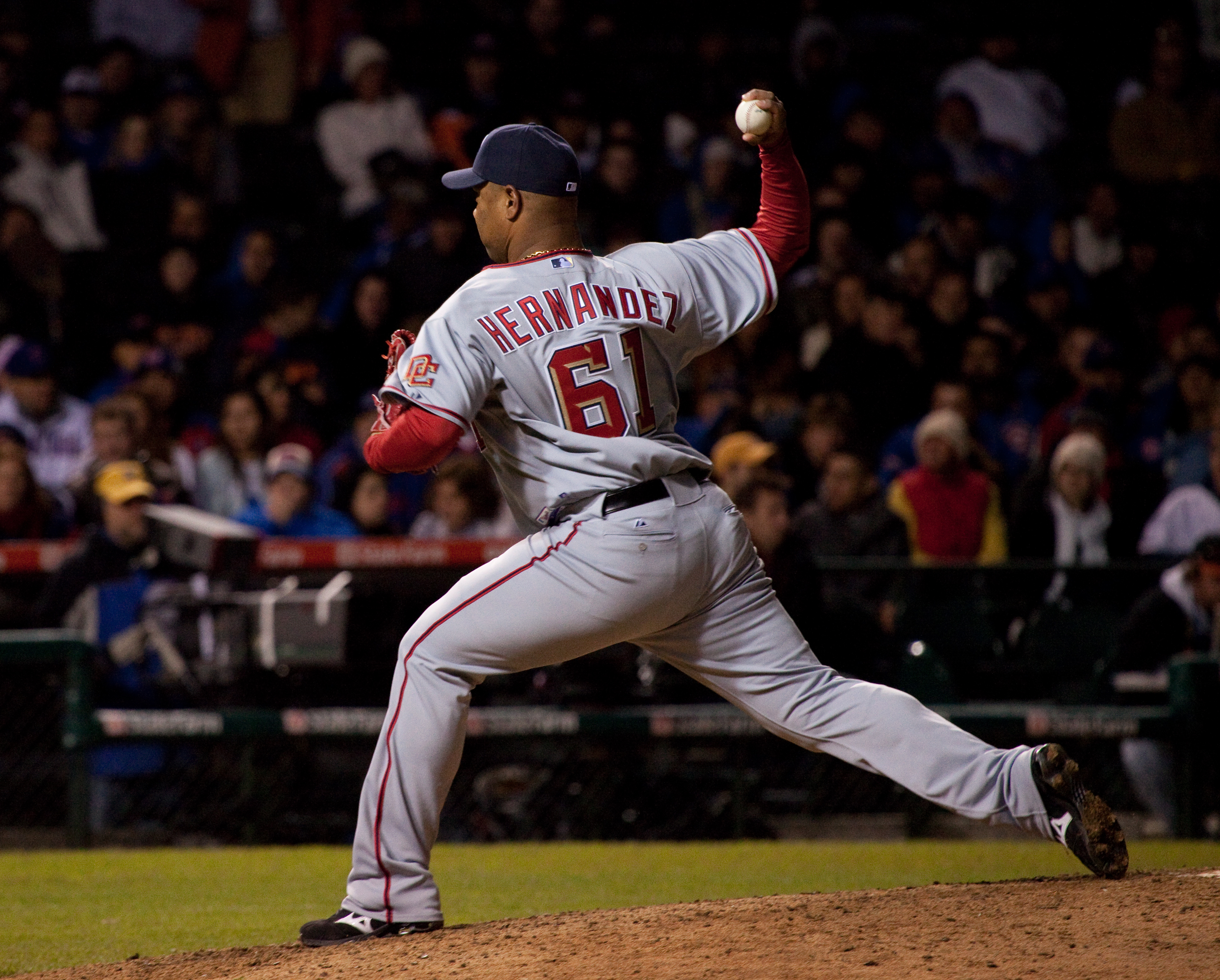
- Hernández with the Nationals in 2010
- Pitcher
- Born: February 20, 1975 (age 51); Villa Clara, Cuba
- Batted: Right Threw: Right

MLB debut
- September 24, 1996, for the Florida Marlins

Last MLB appearance
- September 29, 2012, for the Milwaukee Brewers

MLB statistics
- Win–loss record: 178–177
- Earned run average: 4.44
- Strikeouts: 1,976
- Stats at Baseball Reference

Teams
- Florida Marlins (1996–1999); San Francisco Giants (1999–2002); Montreal Expos / Washington Nationals (2003–2006); Arizona Diamondbacks (2006–2007); Minnesota Twins (2008); Colorado Rockies (2008); New York Mets (2009); Washington Nationals (2009–2011); Atlanta Braves (2012); Milwaukee Brewers (2012)

Career highlights and awards
- 2× All-Star (2004, 2005); World Series champion (1997); World Series MVP (1997); NLCS MVP (1997); Silver Slugger Award (2004)
Medals
Men's baseball
Representing Cuba
Baseball World Cup
Gold medal – first place	1994 Managua	Team

Eisler Liván Hernández Carrera (Spanish pronunciation: [liˈβan eɾˈnandes]; born February 20, 1975) is a Cuban-born former professional baseball pitcher in Major League Baseball. Over a 17-year career, he played for nine different teams and was named to two All-Star Games. He was named the MVP of the 1997 World Series with the Florida Marlins. He is the half-brother of pitcher Orlando "El Duque" Hernández.

Hernández played for the Florida Marlins (1996–1999), the San Francisco Giants (1999–2002), the Montreal Expos (2003–2004), the Washington Nationals (2005–2006, 2009–2011), the Arizona Diamondbacks (2006–2007), the Minnesota Twins (2008), the Colorado Rockies (2008), the New York Mets (2009), the Atlanta Braves (2012) and the Milwaukee Brewers (2012). He bats and throws right-handed, and was known for throwing a "slow hook" curveball, sometimes below 60 miles per hour, as a strikeout pitch.

A two-time All-Star, Hernández was considered to be a great defensive pitcher, having made just fifteen errors in his career. He was described as a workhorse due to his ability to pitch deep into games. Between 1998 and 2007, he never pitched fewer than 199 innings in any given season (in 1999 he threw only 199 2/3 innings). Hernández led the National League in innings pitched in three consecutive seasons, 2003 through 2005, and led the league in complete games for the first two of those years. In 2005, he once threw 150 pitches in nine innings, although the game went into extra innings after he left. In 2004 and 2005, he led the major leagues with 3,927 and 4,009 pitches, respectively.

== Early life ==
Eisler Liván Hernández Carrera was born on February 20, 1975, to a poor family in the Villa Clara Province in Cuba. Hernández's actual age has been the subject of debate. Some believe he is older than his given birthday. After meeting recruiter Joe Cubas in Venezuela in 1994, the two planned an escape through Mexico. At the age of 20, Hernández gave up his job as an official Cuban athlete and defected to the United States in 1995. His half-brother, Orlando, would defect two years later.

== Professional career ==
After meeting with numerous team officials in the Dominican Republic, Hernández signed a four-year, $4.5 million contract with the Florida Marlins on January 13, 1996, in order to live in Miami.

=== Florida Marlins (1996–1999) ===
He made his major league debut for the Marlins on September 24, 1996, tossing three scoreless innings in a relief appearance against the Atlanta Braves. Hernández joined the team for good in June 1997. He finished his rookie season with a 9–3 record, a 3.17 ERA, and 72 strikeouts in 17 starts.

The Marlins reached the 1997 World Series, and Hernández started and won Games 1 and 5 of the series against the Cleveland Indians. In the 1997 National League Championship Series, he struck out a postseason-record 15 batters in Game 5 against the Atlanta Braves. His efforts earned him the World Series MVP trophy.

Before Game 7, Hernández was able to meet his mother, Miriam Carreras, for the first time in two years. The moment was the result of concerted efforts by the Cuban and United States governments as well as a written plea from the entire roster of players. His mother and sister now reside in Miami.

=== San Francisco Giants (1999–2002) ===
On July 25, 1999, the Marlins traded Hernández to the San Francisco Giants for minor leaguers Nate Bump and Jason Grilli. He tallied a career-high 17 wins in 2000, finishing the year with a 17–11 record in 33 starts, alongside a 3.75 ERA in 240 innings. He would regress slightly in the next two seasons, despite pitching 226 2/3 and 216 innings respectively, as he went 13–15 with a 5.24 ERA in 2001 and 12–16 with a 4.38 ERA in 2002 (his 16 losses that year were tied for the most in the National League).

Hernández would go on to pitch in five postseason games during his stint with the Giants, one in 2000 and four in 2002. During the 2002 postseason, Hernández had a record of 1–2 with an ERA of 6.20.

=== Montreal Expos / Washington Nationals (2003–2006) ===
On March 23, 2003, following his loss in Game 7 of the 2002 World Series, Hernández, along with infielder Edwards Guzmán, were traded by the Giants to the Montreal Expos for relief pitchers Jim Brower and Matt Blank.

From 2003 to 2005, Hernández led the National League in innings pitched, and led the league in complete games 2003 and 2004. In 2003, Hernández posted a 15–10 record and had a career-low 3.20 ERA in 33 starts. He threw 233 1/3 innings, including eight complete games, giving up just 225 hits and 57 walks, while recording 178 strikeouts (the seventh-most in the NL) and a career-high 6.87 K/9 ratio, and turned in 22 quality starts. Hernández was particularly dominant in July, going 4–1 in six starts with a 1.80 ERA in 50 innings, throwing three complete games, striking out 43 and holding opponents to a .197 batting average. This helped earn him the NL Pitcher of the Month Award (he also won the Player of the Week Award on July 13, after throwing back-to-back complete game victories and striking out 16.). His most dominant stretch came from July 2 to September 5; Hernández recorded 13 consecutive quality starts, allowing two earned runs or less in 11 of those starts, and pitching at least seven innings in all but one of them. He recorded a 9–2 record with a 1.54 ERA in 105 innings during this stretch, averaging over eight innings per start, while striking out 95 against just 24 walks and holding opponents to a .203 batting average.

The following season, Hernández was selected to represent the Expos at the 2004 All-Star Game in Houston, Texas. This would turn out to be the first of two selections to the Midsummer Classic for Hernández during his career and the last All-Star selection for the Expos. Despite an 11–15 record, Hernández posted a respectable 3.60 ERA in 35 starts (20 of his starts were quality). His 255 innings pitched led all major league pitchers, while giving up just 234 hits, 86 walks, 26 home runs, and holding opponents to a .248 batting average. He struck out a career-high 186 batters (good for ninth in the NL) and threw nine complete games, including two shutouts. Hernández also won the National League Silver Slugger Award for a pitcher, hitting .247 with one home run and 10 RBI.

Between the 2004 and 2005 MLB season, the Montreal Expos franchise, with Hernández in tow, relocated to Washington, D.C. to become the Washington Nationals. Hernández started and won the first major league game in Washington since 1971, defeating the Arizona Diamondbacks 5–3 on April 14, 2005. In 2005, Hernández would once again lead the National League in innings pitched, as well as earn his second All-Star selection; along with reliever Chad Cordero, he was the first All-Star in the new Nationals' history.

After the 2005 season, Hernández had knee surgery, and his performance in the first half of 2006 suffered. At the All-Star break, he had a 5.64 ERA, and opposing batters had been batting .308 against him. But over his last five starts with the Nationals, he had a 3.27 ERA with four walks and 23 strikeouts.

=== Arizona Diamondbacks (2006–2007) ===
On August 7, 2006, Hernández was traded from the Nationals to the Arizona Diamondbacks for two young pitching prospects, Matt Chico and Garrett Mock. He made 10 starts with Arizona to close out the season, going 4–5 with a 3.76 ERA.

Hernández struggled in 2007, finishing the season 11–11 with a 4.93 ERA in 33 starts. He led the majors in home runs allowed, with 34, and had the lowest strikeout-to-walk ratio in the Major Leagues (1.14).

=== Minnesota Twins (2008) ===
On February 12, 2008, Hernández signed a one-year, $5 million deal with the Minnesota Twins, including an additional $2 million for performance bonuses. Through July 20, 2008, Hernández led all Twins starting pitchers with 10 wins and 127 2/3 innings pitched. He was 10–6 with 5.29 ERA and 47 strikeouts. On August 1, 2008, Hernández was designated for assignment to make room for Francisco Liriano. At the time, he was 10–8 with a 5.48 ERA in 23 starts for the Twins.

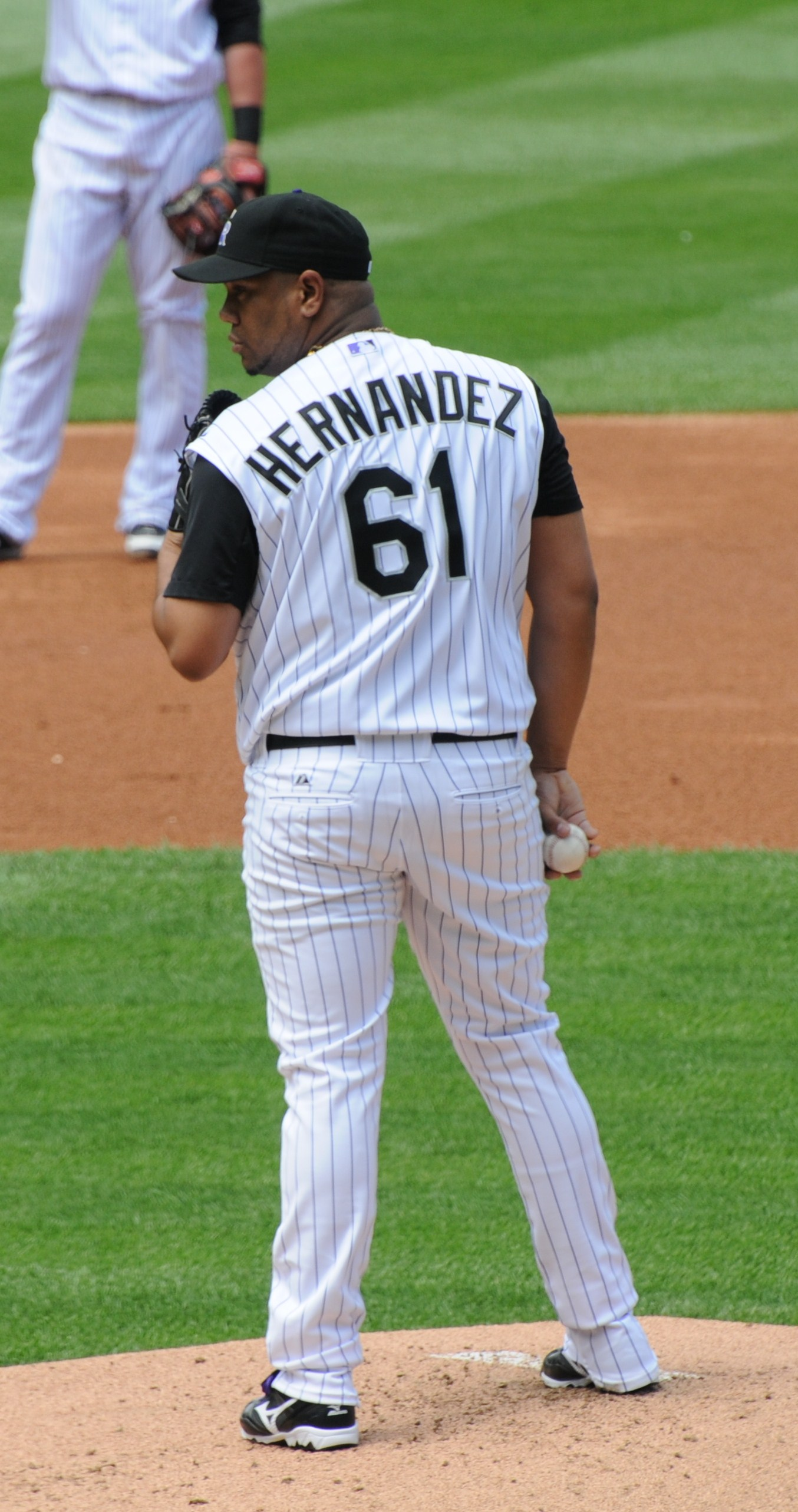
Hernández with the Rockies in 2008.

=== Colorado Rockies (2008) ===
On August 6, Hernández was claimed off waivers by the Colorado Rockies. He posted a record of 3–3 with an 8.03 ERA and 13 strikeouts in 40 1/3 innings across eight starts with the Rockies.

Hernández ended 2008 having given up 12.9 hits per nine innings, the highest rate in the majors, had a major-league-worst .342 batting-average-against, and his 3.4 strikeouts per 9 innings pitched were the lowest rate in the major leagues. Batters also made contact with his pitches 91.3% of the time that they swung at them, easily the highest percentage among major league starters.

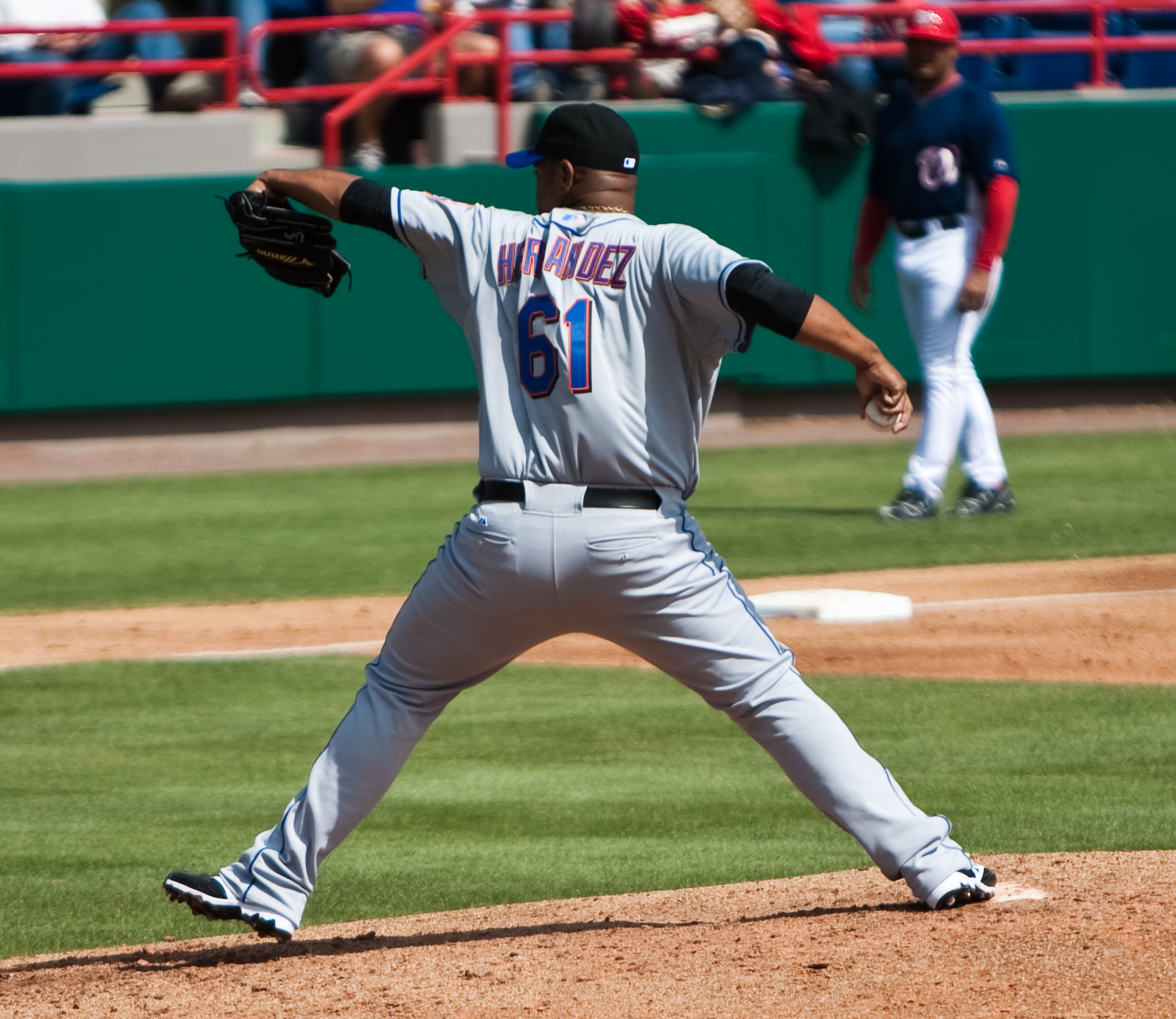
Hernández with the Mets during 2009 spring training.

=== New York Mets (2009) ===
On February 14, 2009, Hernández signed a minor league deal with the New York Mets. He won the fifth spot in the rotation, and was added to the major league roster when his turn came up on April 11.

In 2009, Hernández was one of only three active players, along with Derek Lowe and Brad Ausmus, to have played 12 or more seasons without going on the disabled list.

Hernández securely established himself as a dependable starting pitcher early in the Mets' 2009 pitching rotation. On May 26, 2009, Hernández threw a complete game, allowing just one earned run through his nine innings courtesy of an Adam Dunn home run in a 6–1 win over his former club, the Washington Nationals. He was the first pitcher to throw a complete game in Citi Field, and became the only active player to have thrown a complete game with six different teams.

However, after struggling greatly in July and August, Hernández's job was put in jeopardy. After a 6–2 loss to the Diamondbacks, manager Jerry Manuel decided to start Hernández against the San Francisco Giants, who handed the Mets a 10–1 loss on August 17, 2009. Subsequently, on August 20, the Mets released Hernández to make room for Billy Wagner on the active roster.

=== Second stint with the Washington Nationals (2009–2011) ===
On August 26, 2009, Hernández re-signed with the Washington Nationals. He went 2–4 with a 5.36 ERA in eight starts to finish the season.

On February 24, 2010, Hernández signed a minor league deal to stay with the Nationals. He was called up on April 11. Hernández had a bounce-back season in 2010, finishing 10–12 with a 3.66 ERA in 33 starts. On August 29, 2010, he signed a one-year contract extension with the Nationals for the 2011 season.

Hernández was the starting pitcher on Opening Day of the 2011 season, his fourth Opening Day appearance for the franchise. Despite allowing only two earned runs on four hits in 6 2/3 innings, he took the loss in a 2–0 defeat to the Atlanta Braves.

On August 30 against the Braves, Hernández threw his 50,000th pitch of his MLB career, getting Jair Jurrjens to ground out and end the inning. Since 1988, only 11 pitchers have thrown more pitches.

=== Houston Astros ===
On January 31, 2012, Hernández signed a minor league contract with the Houston Astros with an invitation to attend spring training. He was released by the Astros on March 30.

=== Atlanta Braves (2012) ===
Within hours of being released by the Astros, Hernández was signed to a one-year Major League deal by the Atlanta Braves as a relief pitcher. On May 5, 2012, he recorded his first career save in his 485th major league appearance. On June 19, 2012, Hernández was released by the Braves. His release came after his relief appearance on June 10 where he allowed seven hits (including two home runs) in just 1 2/3 innings as the Braves were defeated by the Toronto Blue Jays.

=== Milwaukee Brewers (2012) ===
On June 22, 2012, Hernández signed a one-year deal with the Milwaukee Brewers. Following the season, he was removed from the 40-man roster and opted to become a free agent.

== Retirement ==
After not playing in the Major Leagues for a full season, Hernández officially retired from professional play on March 13, 2014. Hernández filed for Chapter 13 bankruptcy on June 30, 2017, in United States bankruptcy court in Fort Lauderdale, Florida. Despite earning more than $53 million during his 15-year career, his assets were worth no more than $50,000 and he owed up to $1 million to as many as 50 creditors. Court documents revealed Hernández had no bank account and gambled heavily at local South Florida casinos.

Hernández now runs a youth baseball academy in Miami.

== Pitching style ==
As a young man, Hernández had a fastball in the mid-90s, a slider, and a changeup. As he aged, he became a finesse pitcher who relied on locating his pitches rather than generating great pitch speed. His primary pitch was a sinker sitting at 83–87 mph. He also had a four-seam fastball in the same speed range. Another main pitch, used mostly against right-handed hitters, was a cut fastball at 79–82 mph. His off-speed offering to right-handers was a curveball ranging from 65 to 70 mph. Against lefties, he also added a changeup in the upper 70s. His four-seam fastball was the slowest among all MLB starters in the 2011 season.

Hernández was an excellent fielder throughout his career, finishing seven full seasons without making an error. He posted a career .982 fielding percentage committing only 15 errors in 827 total chances in 3,189 innings of work and 519 games pitched. As of September 30, 2019, he owns the 128th-best fielding percentage all-time among pitchers. He also was a better than average hitting pitcher, posting a .221 batting average (215-for-973) with 64 runs, 38 doubles, 10 home runs and 85 RBI.

== See also ==
- List of baseball players who defected from Cuba
- List of Major League Baseball career batters faced leaders
- List of Major League Baseball career games started leaders
- List of Major League Baseball career losses leaders
- List of Major League Baseball career putouts as a pitcher leaders
- List of Major League Baseball players from Cuba
- List of Miami Marlins team records
- List of World Series starting pitchers
- Miami Marlins award winners and league leaders

Awards and achievements
Preceded by Mark Redman	National League Player of the Week; July 7–13, 2003 (with Preston Wilson)	Succeeded by Rich Aurilia
Preceded by Dontrelle Willis	National League Pitcher of the Month; July 2003	Succeeded by Mark Prior
Sporting positions
Preceded by Mark Gardner; None; John Lannan	Opening Day starting pitcher 2000—2002 San Francisco Giants; 2005—2006 Washington Nationals; 2011 Washington Nationals	Succeeded by Kirk Rueter; John Patterson; Stephen Strasburg
