= Mike MacDougal =

American baseball player (born 1977)

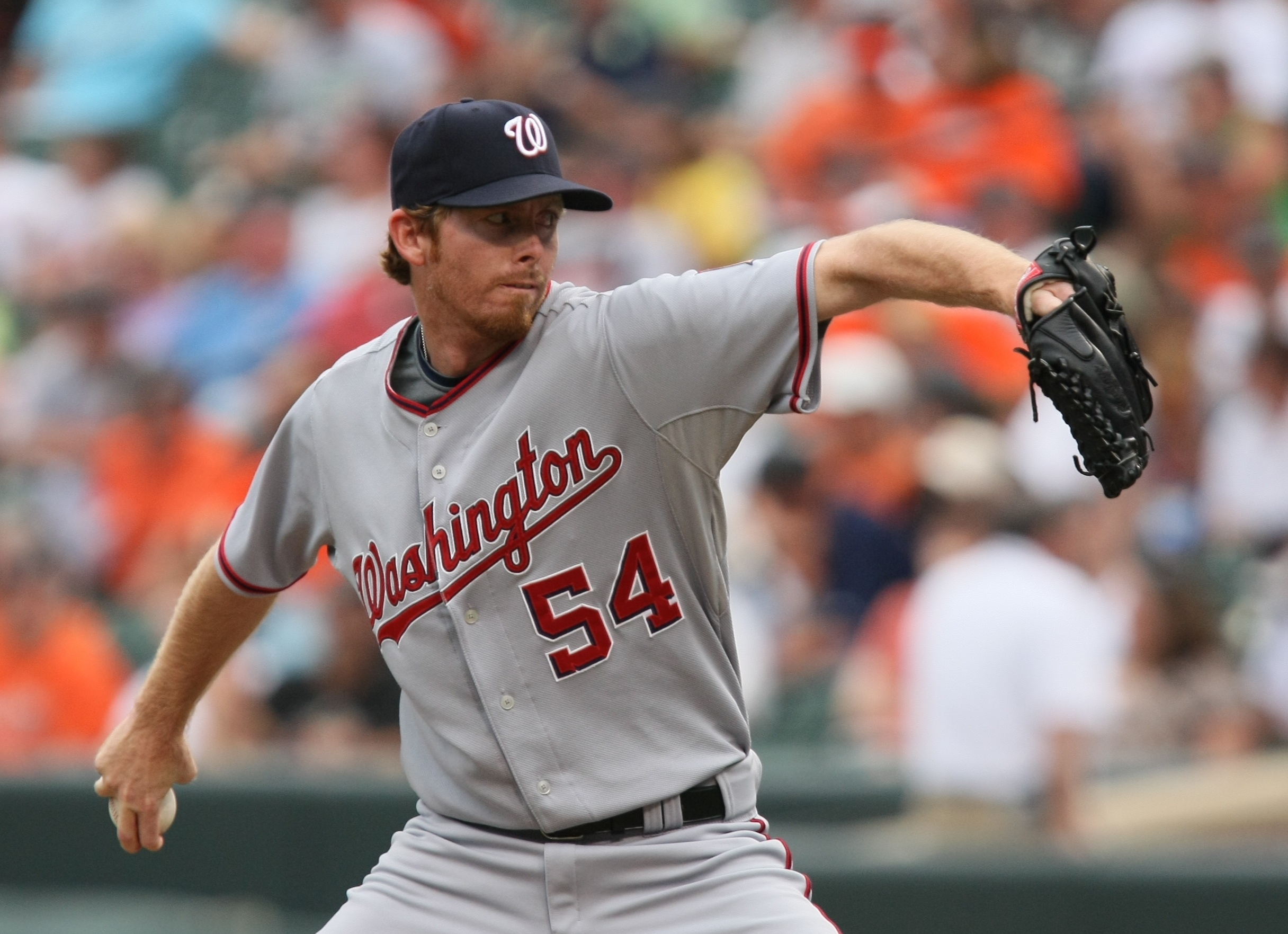
- MacDougal with the Washington Nationals
- Pitcher
- Born: March 5, 1977 (age 49); Las Vegas, Nevada, U.S.
- Batted: Switch Threw: Right

MLB debut
- September 22, 2001, for the Kansas City Royals

Last MLB appearance
- April 30, 2012, for the Los Angeles Dodgers

MLB statistics
- Win–loss record: 18–23
- Earned run average: 4.00
- Strikeouts: 325
- Saves: 71
- Stats at Baseball Reference

Teams
- Kansas City Royals (2001–2006); Chicago White Sox (2006–2009); Washington Nationals (2009); St. Louis Cardinals (2010); Los Angeles Dodgers (2011–2012)

Career highlights and awards
- All-Star (2003)

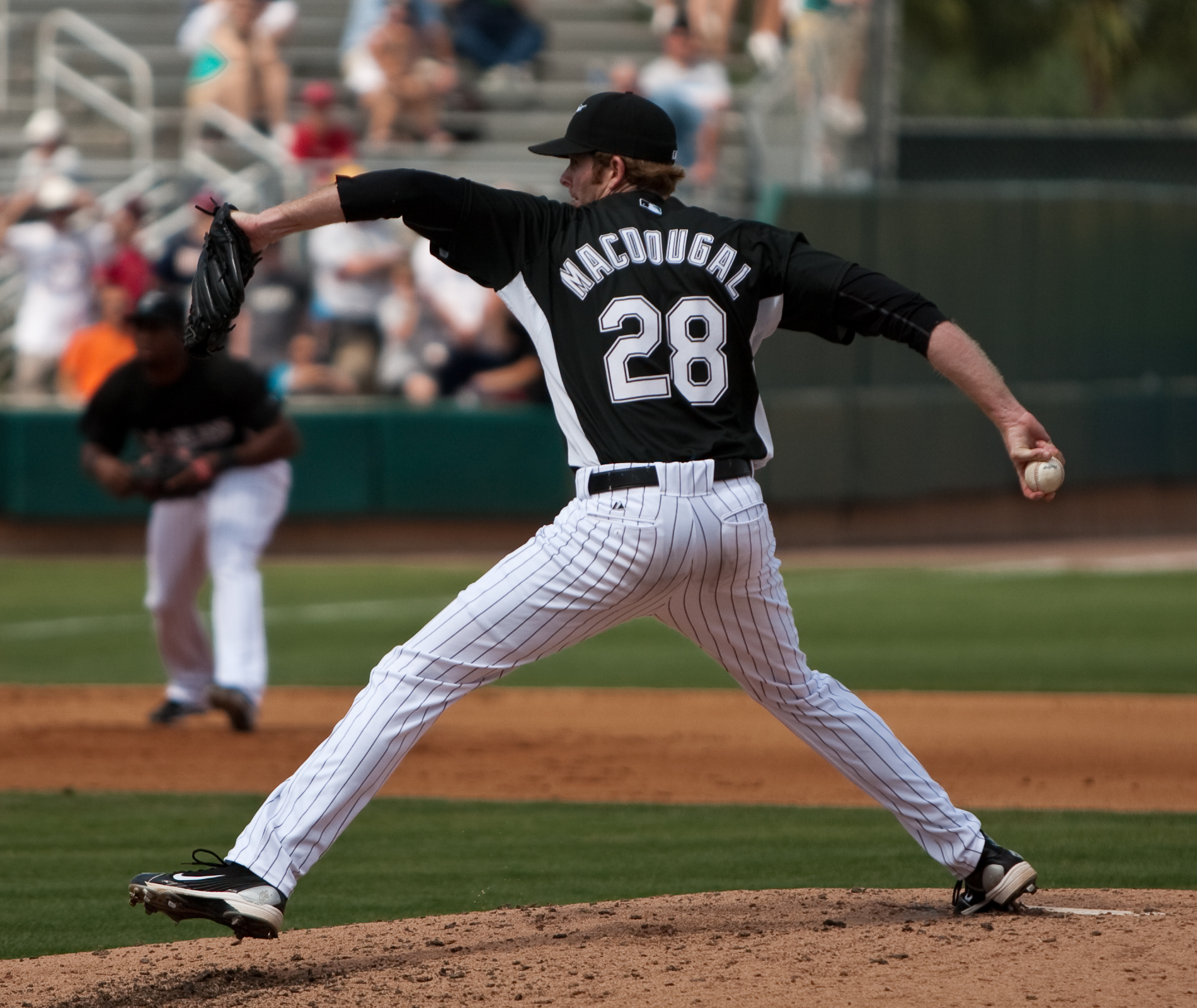
MacDougal pitching for the Florida Marlins in 2010 spring training.

Robert Meiklejohn MacDougal (born March 5, 1977) is an American former professional baseball player who was a relief pitcher. He is a switch hitter and throws right-handed. He played in Major League Baseball (MLB) for the Kansas City Royals, Chicago White Sox, Washington Nationals, St. Louis Cardinals and Los Angeles Dodgers.

His pitch selection include a fastball in the 95-98 mph range, a slider, curve, and a changeup used only occasionally.

== Amateur career ==
Born in Las Vegas, Nevada, MacDougal graduated from Mesa High School in Mesa, Arizona, and attended Wake Forest University, where he pitched for the Wake Forest Demon Deacons baseball team. In 1997, he played collegiate summer baseball for the Cotuit Kettleers of the Cape Cod Baseball League, was named a league all-star, and returned to the league in 1998 to play with the Chatham A's.

He was selected in the 22nd round (651st overall) of the 1996 Major League Baseball draft and the 17th round of the 1998 Major League Baseball draft by the Baltimore Orioles, but did not sign on either occasion.

== Professional career ==
=== Kansas City Royals ===
Following his senior season at Wake Forest, MacDougal was drafted by the Kansas City Royals in the first round (25th overall) of the 1999 Major League Baseball draft, as a compensation pick from the Boston Red Sox for the signing of José Offerman. He signed on July 1, 1999.

MacDougal made his major league debut as a starting pitcher, but suffered a fractured skull late in the 2001 season when he was struck in the head by a bat that had escaped from the hand of Carlos Beltrán. He lost feeling in his right arm and was unable to pitch for three months. In 2003, the Royals turned him into a closer. That season, he was 3–5 with 27 saves and a 4.08 ERA in 68 relief appearances. He also made the American League All-Star team for the only time in his career.

MacDougal struggled with flu-like symptoms in spring training in 2004, causing him to lose weight and, as a result, to lose velocity off his fastball, which had been clocked as high as 103 miles per hour. He lost his job as the Royals' closer to Jeremy Affeldt and spent much of the 2004 season in the minor leagues. However, early in 2005, he was reinstalled as the closer after Affeldt himself was injured.

MacDougal battled injuries again in 2006, starting the season on the DL and not returning to the field until mid-July. After only about a week after his first appearance of the year, he was traded to the Chicago White Sox for minor-league pitchers Tyler Lumsden and Dan Cortes on July 24, 2006.

=== Chicago White Sox ===
The addition of MacDougal was to be a move to bolster the White Sox bullpen as they vied for playoff contention, and while the team ended up missing the playoffs, MacDougal was quite effective in his 25 appearances, going 1–1 with an ERA of 1.80. Combining his appearances with both teams, he finished the year with a 1.55 ERA.

MacDougal's 2006 performance earned him a new three-year, $6.45 million deal with the White Sox on December 8, 2006. However, he was not able to carry his success from the end of the 2006 season into 2007. MacDougal finished the season 2–5 with a 6.80 ERA in 54 relief appearances. He also spent more time on the DL with right-shoulder inflammation, and was also optioned to the Triple-A Charlotte Knights in June due to his struggles.

On April 21, 2009, MacDougal was designated for assignment by the White Sox, and was released on April 29.

=== Washington Nationals ===
MacDougal signed a minor league deal with the Washington Nationals on May 3, 2009. On December 12, 2009, MacDougal was non-tendered by the Nationals, making him a free agent.

On February 18, 2010, MacDougal signed a minor league contract with the Florida Marlins with an invite to spring training. He was released on March 23. The next day, MacDougal signed a minor league deal to return to the Nationals. On July 1, 2010, he decided to opt out of his contract to become a free agent.

=== St. Louis Cardinals ===
On July 7, 2010, MacDougal signed a minor league deal with the St. Louis Cardinals, making his debut for Triple-A Memphis that night, giving up two runs on two hits in one inning pitched. MacDougal made his Cardinals debut on July 28, 2010, earning the win in a 7–6 victory over the New York Mets. In 17 games with the Cardinals, he was 1–1 with a 7.23 ERA.

=== Los Angeles Dodgers ===
On January 28, 2011, he signed a minor league contract with the Los Angeles Dodgers, and made the Major League club to start the season. MacDougal pitched in 69 games with the Dodgers, working 57 innings and had a record of 3–1 and a team-leading 2.05 ERA. He re-signed with the Dodgers after the season for a one-year, $1 million contract that included a 2013 option. He pitched in seven games for the Dodgers in 2012, recording a 7.94 ERA. MacDougal was designated for assignment on May 3, removing him from the 40-man roster. He was released on May 11.

=== Later career ===
On May 15, 2012, the Chicago Cubs signed MacDougal to a minor league contract. He pitched in 19 games for the AAA Iowa Cubs, going 1–2 with one save and a 7.85 ERA. On July 11, he was released by the Cubs. On July 29, the Washington Nationals re-signed MacDougal to a minor-league deal. He joined the AAA Syracuse Chiefs, where he had a 1–1 record an ERA of 4.22 in 12 games.

In April 2013, the Cincinnati Reds signed MacDougal to a minor-league deal. He joined the AAA Louisville Bats. He was released by the Reds on June 8, going 0–1 in 17 appearances with the Bats, striking out 20 in 19 2/3 innings with a 5.49 ERA. On June 25, MacDougal signed a deal with the Philadelphia Phillies and reported to Triple-A Lehigh Valley.

The Seattle Mariners signed MacDougal on a minor-league deal on May 10, 2014. He had been pitching for the independent Camden Riversharks.
