= J. D. Martin =

American baseball player (born 1983)

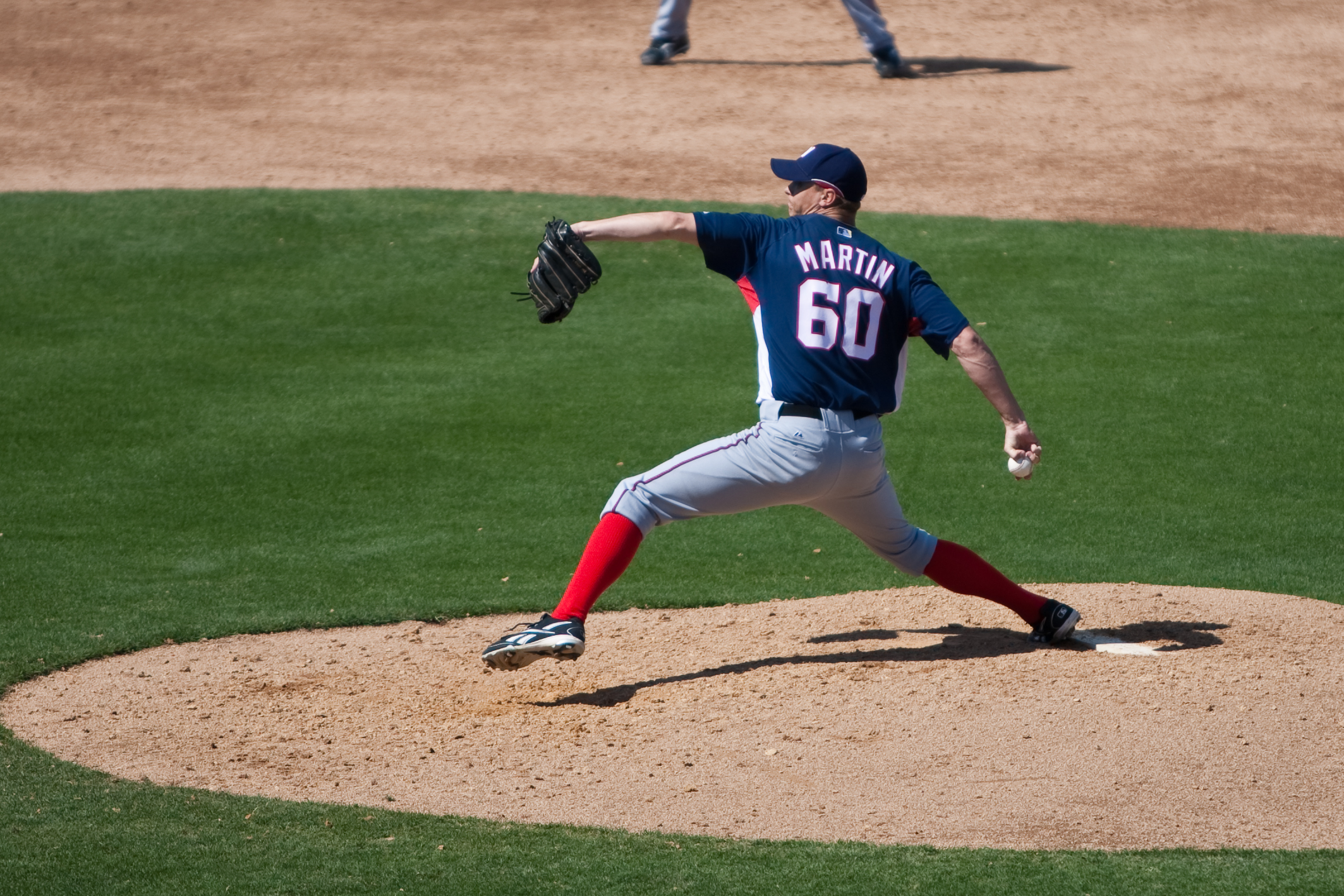
- Martin with the Washington Nationals
- Pitcher
- Born: January 2, 1983 (age 43); Ridgecrest, California, U.S.
- Batted: Right Threw: Right

Professional debut
- MLB: July 20, 2009, for the Washington Nationals
- KBO: April 20, 2014, for the Samsung Lions

Last appearance
- MLB: July 24, 2010, for the Washington Nationals
- KBO: October 12, 2014, for the Samsung Lions

MLB statistics
- Win–loss record: 6–9
- Earned run average: 4.32
- Strikeouts: 68

KBO statistics
- Win–loss record: 9–6
- Earned run average: 4.78
- Strikeouts: 84
- Stats at Baseball Reference

Teams
- Washington Nationals (2009–2010); Samsung Lions (2014)

Career highlights and awards
- Korean Series champion (2014)

John Dale Martin (born January 2, 1983) is an American former professional baseball pitcher. He played in Major League Baseball (MLB) for the Washington Nationals and in the KBO League for the Samsung Lions.

Martin is described as "a strike-thrower with a below average fastball who lives off of his changeup." His "fastball clocks in the high-80s, at best, but he locates it well while mixing in a cutter and changeup."

== Professional career ==
=== Cleveland Indians ===
Martin was a first round pick by the Cleveland Indians in the 2001 Major League Baseball draft and played for the Indians' organization for eight years. He suffered injuries, and in 2005 he underwent Tommy John surgery, causing him to miss the second half of '05 and first half of 2006. In 2008, he spent his last season in the Indians organization with their Triple-A affiliate, the Buffalo Bisons.

=== Washington Nationals ===
On November 24, 2008, Martin signed with Washington as a minor-league free agent. In the first half of 2009, he went 8–3 in 15 starts with a 2.66 ERA for the Triple-A International League Syracuse Chiefs, recording 63 strikeouts and 10 walks.

On July 19, 2009, Martin was called up to replace injured pitcher Scott Olsen. On July 20 he made his major league debut, starting for the Nationals against the New York Mets. He pitched four innings and gave up five runs on eight hits, with one strikeout and no walks.

On August 9, 2009, Martin earned his first major league win as he pitched five innings and gave up one run on five hits. The Nationals beat the Arizona Diamondbacks 9–2 in Martin's fifth start. He ended the season with a 5–4 record, 37 strikeouts, 24 walks, and a 4.44 earned run average in 15 starts.

After the 2010 season, Martin was given his outright release, then signed a minor league contract with Washington. He spent the 2011 season in Syracuse, where he pitched in 30 games, including 14 starts, and posted an ERA of 3.93.

=== Miami Marlins ===
In December 2011, Martin signed a minor league contract with the Miami Marlins.

=== Tampa Bay Rays ===
On January 10, 2013, Martin signed a minor league contract with the Tampa Bay Rays. He spent the 2013 season starting for the Triple-A Durham Bulls. Martin's contract was selected by the Rays on September 22, 2013. He was designated for assignment the next day without appearing in a game.

=== Samsung Lions ===
Martin spent 2014 with the Samsung Lions of Korea Professional Baseball.

=== Chicago White Sox ===
Martin signed a minor league deal with the Chicago White Sox on January 22, 2015.

=== Lancaster Barnstormers ===
On March 31, 2016, Martin signed with the Lancaster Barnstormers of the Atlantic League of Professional Baseball. In 6 starts for Lancaster, he struggled to a 1-2 record and 7.81 ERA with 22 strikeouts across 27 2/3 innings pitched. Martin was released by the Barnstormers on May 31.

=== Washington Nationals (second stint) ===
On June 9, 2016, Martin signed a minor league deal with the Washington Nationals. Taking advice from years earlier from then-Nationals pitching coordinator Spin Williams, Martin began throwing a knuckleball. He joined the High–A Potomac Nationals and made his first start in the Carolina League in ten years on August 14 against the Frederick Keys. He was released on July 9, 2017.

=== Tampa Bay Rays (second stint) ===
On February 14, 2018, Martin signed a minor league contract with the Tampa Bay Rays. He made 25 appearances (22 starts) for the Double–A Montgomery Biscuits, compiling an 8–10 record and 4.49 ERA with 71 strikeouts across 124 1/3 innings pitched. Martin elected free agency following the season on November 2.

=== Los Angeles Dodgers ===
On February 7, 2019, Martin signed a minor league contract with the Los Angeles Dodgers. He made 22 starts split between the Double–A Tulsa Drillers and Triple–A Oklahoma City Dodgers, accumulating a 5–10 record and 5.56 ERA with 97 strikeouts across 124 2/3 innings pitched. Martin elected free agency following the season on November 4.
