= 2011 Florida Marlins season =

2011 Florida Marlins
- League: National League
- Division: East
- Ballpark: Sun Life Stadium
- City: Miami Gardens, Florida
- Record: 72–90 (.444)
- Divisional place: 5th
- Owners: Jeffrey Loria
- President of baseball operations: Larry Beinfest
- General managers: Michael Hill
- Managers: Edwin Rodríguez (resigned June 19); Jack McKeon, Brandon Hyde (interim manager for one game)
- Television: Fox Sports Florida (Rich Waltz, Tommy Hutton) (English) (Raul Striker, Jr., Cookie Rojas) (Spanish)
- Radio: Florida Marlins Radio Network (Dave Van Horne, Glenn Geffner) (English); WAQI (Felo Ramírez, Luis Quintata) (Spanish)

The 2011 Florida Marlins season was the 19th season for the Major League Baseball franchise. This was the final year in which the Marlins played their home games at Sun Life Stadium, as well as the final season for the team under the name "Florida Marlins". They failed to make the playoffs for the eighth consecutive season.

== Season standings ==
=== National League East ===
NL East
Team	W	L	Pct.	GB	Home	Road
Philadelphia Phillies	102	60	.630	—	52‍–‍29	50‍–‍31
Atlanta Braves	89	73	.549	13	47‍–‍34	42‍–‍39
Washington Nationals	80	81	.497	21½	44‍–‍36	36‍–‍45
New York Mets	77	85	.475	25	34‍–‍47	43‍–‍38
Florida Marlins	72	90	.444	30	31‍–‍47	41‍–‍43

=== National League Wild Card ===
Division leaders
Team	W	L	Pct.
Philadelphia Phillies	102	60	.630
Milwaukee Brewers	96	66	.593
Arizona Diamondbacks	94	68	.580

Wild Card team (Top team qualifies for postseason)
Team	W	L	Pct.	GB
St. Louis Cardinals	90	72	.556	—
Atlanta Braves	89	73	.549	1
San Francisco Giants	86	76	.531	4
Los Angeles Dodgers	82	79	.509	7½
Washington Nationals	80	81	.497	9½
Cincinnati Reds	79	83	.488	11
New York Mets	77	85	.475	13
Colorado Rockies	73	89	.451	17
Florida Marlins	72	90	.444	18
Pittsburgh Pirates	72	90	.444	18
Chicago Cubs	71	91	.438	19
San Diego Padres	71	91	.438	19
Houston Astros	56	106	.346	34

== Record vs. opponents ==
2011 National League record Source: MLB Standings Grid – 2011
Team	AZ	ATL	CHC	CIN	COL	FLA	HOU	LAD	MIL	NYM	PHI	PIT	SD	SF	STL	WSH	AL
Arizona	–	2–3	3–4	4–2	13–5	5–2	6–1	10–8	4–3	3–3	3–3	3–3	11–7	9–9	3–4	5–3	10–8
Atlanta	3–2	–	4–3	3–3	6–2	12–6	5–1	2–5	5–3	9–9	6–12	4–2	4–5	6–1	1–5	9–9	10–5
Chicago	4–3	3–4	–	7–11	2–4	3–3	8–7	3–3	6–10	4–2	2–5	8–8	3–3	5–4	5–10	3–4	5–10
Cincinnati	2–4	3–3	11–7	–	3–4	3–3	9–6	4–2	8–8	2–5	1–7	5–10	4–2	5–2	9–6	4–2	6–12
Colorado	5–13	2–6	4–2	4–3	–	3–3	5–2	9–9	3–6	5–2	1–4	4–3	9–9	5–13	2–4	4–3	8–7
Florida	2–5	6–12	3–3	3–3	3–3	–	6–1	3–3	0–7	9–9	6–12	6–0	0–7	4–2	2–6	11–7	8–10
Houston	1–6	1–5	7–8	6–9	2–5	1–6	–	4–5	3–12	3–3	2–4	7–11	3–5	4–3	5–10	3–3	4–11
Los Angeles	8–10	5–2	3–3	2–4	9–9	3–3	5–4	–	2–4	2–5	1–5	6–2	13–5	9–9	4–3	4–2	6–9
Milwaukee	3–4	3–5	10–6	8–8	6–3	7–0	12–3	4–2	–	4–2	3–4	12–3	3–2	3–3	9–9	3–3	6–9
New York	3–3	9–9	2–4	5–2	2–5	9–9	3–3	5–2	2–4	–	7–11	4–4	4–3	2–4	3–3	8–10	9–9
Philadelphia	3–3	12–6	5–2	7–1	4–1	12–6	4–2	5–1	4–3	11–7	–	4–2	7–1	4–3	3–6	8–10	9–6
Pittsburgh	3–3	2–4	8–8	10–5	3–4	0–6	11–7	2–6	3–12	4–4	2–4	–	2–4	3–3	7–9	4–4	8–7
San Diego	7–11	5–4	3–3	2–4	9–9	7–0	5–3	5–13	2–3	3–4	1–7	4–2	–	6–12	3–3	3–4	6–9
San Francisco	9–9	1–6	4–5	2–5	13–5	2–4	3–4	9–9	3–3	4–2	3–4	3–3	12–6	–	5–2	3–4	10–5
St. Louis	4–3	5–1	10–5	6–9	4–2	6–2	10–5	3–4	9–9	3–3	6–3	9–7	3–3	2–5	–	2–4	8–7
Washington	3–5	9–9	4–3	2–4	3–4	7–11	3–3	2–4	3–3	10–8	10–8	4–4	4–3	4–3	4–2	–	8–7

== Regular season ==
=== Game log ===
Legend
Marlins win	Marlins loss	Game postponed

2011 game log
April (16–9)

#	Date	Opponent	Score	Win	Loss	Save	Attendance	Record
1	April 1	Mets	6–2	Johnson (1–0)	Pelfrey (0–1)		41,237	1–0
2	April 2	Mets	4–6 (10)	Rodríguez (1–0)	Webb (0–1)	Boyer (1)	32,495	1–1
3	April 3	Mets	2–9	Dickey (1–0)	Vázquez (0–1)		18,936	1–2
4	April 5	Nationals	3–2 (10)	Mujica (1–0)	Storen (0–1)		10,482	2–2
5	April 6	Nationals	7–4	Sanches (1–0)	Gaudin (0–1)	Núñez (1)	13,825	3–2
6	April 7	Nationals	3–5 (11)	Coffey (1–0)	Mujica (1–1)	Burnett (2)	10,696	3–3
7	April 8	@ Astros	4–3	Nolasco (1–0)	López (0–1)	Núñez (2)	41,042	4–3
8	April 9	@ Astros	7–5	Vázquez (1–1)	Abad (1–1)	Núñez (3)	25,421	5–3
9	April 10	@ Astros	1–7	Happ (1–1)	Sánchez (0–1)		22,299	5–4
10	April 12	@ Braves	0–5	Hanson (1–2)	Volstad (0–1)		13,865	5–5
11	April 13	@ Braves	5–1	Johnson (2–0)	Hudson (2–1)		14,351	6–5
12	April 14	@ Braves	6–5	Sanches (2–0)	O'Flaherty (0–1)	Núñez (4)	16,495	7–5
13	April 15	@ Phillies	4–3	Mujica (2–1)	Báez (1–1)	Núñez (5)	45,667	8–5
–	April 16	@ Phillies	Postponed (rain); Makeup: June 15 as part of a doubleheader					
14	April 17	@ Phillies	2–3	Madson (1–0)	Webb (0–2)	Contreras (3)	45,716	9–5
15	April 19	Pirates	6–0	Johnson (3–0)	Maholm (0–3)		11,118	9–6
16	April 20	Pirates	6–0	Nolasco (2–0)	Morton (2–1)		10,112	10–6
17	April 21	Pirates	9–5	Volstad (1–1)	McDonald (0–2)		12,308	11–6
18	April 22	Rockies	4–1	Sánchez (1–1)	Chacín (3–1)		15,069	12–6
19	April 23	Rockies	1–3	Hammel (2–1)	Vázquez (1–2)	Street (7)	35,381	12–7
20	April 24	Rockies	6–3	Dunn (1–0)	Belisle (2–1)	Núñez (6)	11,442	13–7
21	April 25	Dodgers	5–4	Sanches (3–0)	Broxton (1–1)		11,633	14–7
22	April 26	Dodgers	4–2	Volstad (2–1)	Kershaw (2–3)	Núñez (7)	12,150	15–7
23	April 27	Dodgers	4–5 (10)	Guerrier (2–1)	Sanches (3–1)	Padilla (1)	16,523	15–8
24	April 29	@ Reds	7–6	Vázquez (2–2)	Wood (1–3)	Núñez (8)	27,051	16–8
25	April 30	@ Reds	3–4 (10)	Cordero (1–0)	Dunn (1–1)		40,286	16–9

May (15–13)

#	Date	Opponent	Score	Win	Loss	Save	Attendance	Record
26	May 1	@ Reds	9–5	Nolasco (3–0)	Arroyo (3–3)	Núñez (9)	26,941	17–9
27	May 2	@ Cardinals	6–5	Mujica (3–1)	Boggs (0–2)	Núñez (10)	32,635	18–9
28	May 3	@ Cardinals	5–7	Salas (1–0)	Webb (0–3)	Sánchez (2)	32,689	18–10
29	May 4	@ Cardinals	8–7	Dunn (2–1)	Sánchez (1–1)	Núñez (11)	34,324	19–10
30	May 5	@ Cardinals	3–6	Motte (1–0)	Johnson (3–1)	Sánchez (3)	38,509	19–11
31	May 6	Nationals	2–3 (10)	Storen (2–1)	Dunn (2–2)	Burnett (4)	15,325	19–12
32	May 7	Nationals	2–5	Gorzelanny (2–2)	Volstad (2–2)	Storen (7)	17,409	19–13
33	May 8	Nationals	8–0	Sánchez (2–1)	Hernández (3–4)		10,523	20–13
34	May 9	Phillies	4–6	Blanton (1–1)	Vázquez (2–3)	Madson (4)	11,444	20–14
35	May 10	Phillies	2–1	Dunn (3–2)	Halladay (5–2)	Núñez (12)	21,955	21–14
36	May 11	Phillies	3–5	Kendrick (3–2)	Núñez (0–1)	Madson (5)	18,504	21–15
37	May 13	@ Nationals	6–5 (11)	Mujica (4–1)	Broderick (0–1)	Núñez (13)	19,503	22–15
38	May 14	@ Nationals	1–0	Sánchez (3–1)	Hernández (3–5)	Núñez (14)	22,497	23–15
39	May 15	@ Nationals	4–8	Marquis (5–1)	Vázquez (2–4)		18,356	23–16
40	May 16	@ Mets	2–1 (11)	Badenhop (1–0)	Igarashi (0–1)	Núñez (15)	23,721	24–16
–	May 17	@ Mets	Postponed (rain); Makeup: July 18					
41	May 18	Cubs	5–7	Samardzija (3–0)	Mujica (4–2)	Mármol (9)	14,422	24–17
42	May 19	Cubs	1–5	Coleman (2–3)	Volstad (2–3)		16,345	24–18
43	May 20	Rays	5–3	Dunn (4–2)	Peralta (1–3)	Núñez (16)	18,111	25–18
44	May 21	Rays	5–3	Vázquez (3–4)	Price (5–4)	Núñez (17)	21,814	26–18
45	May 22	Rays	0–4	Shields (5–2)	Buente (0–1)		15,432	26–19
46	May 24	@ Giants	5–1	Nolasco (4–0)	Cain (3–3)	Núñez (18)	41,165	27–19
47	May 25	@ Giants	7–6 (12)	Webb (1–3)	Mota (2–1)	Badenhop (1)	41,037	28–19
48	May 26	@ Giants	1–0	Sánchez (4–1)	Vogelsong (3–1)		41,472	29–19
49	May 27	@ Dodgers	2–3	De La Rosa (1–0)	Hensley (0–1)		34,407	29–20
50	May 28	@ Dodgers	6–1	Mujica (5–2)	Kuroda (5–5)		29,971	30–20
51	May 29	@ Dodgers	0–8	Kershaw (6–3)	Nolasco (4–1)		30,621	30–21
52	May 30	@ Diamondbacks	4–15	Saunders (2–5)	Volstad (2–4)		23,465	30–22
53	May 31	@ Diamondbacks	5–2	Sánchez (5–1)	Kennedy (6–2)	Núñez (19)	17,571	31–22

June (5–23)

#	Date	Opponent	Score	Win	Loss	Save	Attendance	Record
54	June 1	@ Diamondbacks	5–6	Putz (1–1)	Hensley (0–2)		16,169	31–23
55	June 3	Brewers	5–6	McClendon (3–0)	Núñez (0–2)	Axford (14)	15,315	31–24
56	June 4	Brewers	2–3	Gallardo (8–2)	Volstad (2–5)	Axford (15)	17,204	31–25
57	June 5	Brewers	5–6 (11)	Dillard (1–0)	Dunn (4–3)	Axford (16)	13,208	31–26
58	June 6	Brewers	2–7	Greinke (5–1)	Vázquez (3–5)		12,404	31–27
59	June 7	Braves	0–1	Hanson (7–4)	Hand (0–1)	Kimbrel (18)	13,302	31–28
60	June 8	Braves	2–3 (10)	Kimbrel (2–2)	Dunn (4–4)	Linebrink (1)	14,626	31–29
61	June 9	Braves	2–3	Jurrjens (8–2)	Volstad (2–6)	Venters (2)	16,613	31–30
62	June 10	Diamondbacks	6–4	Sánchez (6–1)	Saunders (3–6)	Cishek (1)	18,888	32–30
63	June 11	Diamondbacks	5–9	Kennedy (7–2)	Vázquez (3–6)		25,321	32–31
64	June 12	Diamondbacks	1–5	Hudson (7–5)	Hand (0–2)		16,353	32–32
65	June 13	Diamondbacks	9–12	Owings (3–0)	Nolasco (4–2)	Putz (18)	15,065	32–33
66	June 14	@ Phillies	1–9	Hamels (9–2)	Volstad (2–7)		45,424	32–34
67	June 15	@ Phillies	1–8	Kendrick (4–4)	Villanueva (0–1)		44,758	32–35
68	June 15	@ Phillies	4–5 (10)	Madson (3–1)	Dunn (4–5)		45,880	32–36
69	June 16	@ Phillies	0–3	Lee (7–5)	Vázquez (3–7)		45,628	32–37
70	June 17	@ Rays	1–5	Davis (6–5)	Hand (0–3)	Farnsworth (15)	15,708	32–38
71	June 18	@ Rays	4–7	Cobb (2–0)	Nolasco (4–3)		20,495	32–39
72	June 19	@ Rays	1–2	Shields (7–4)	Webb (1–4)		26,761	32–40
73	June 20	Angels	1–2	Weaver (9–4)	Cishek (0–1)	Walden (17)	16,984	32–41
74	June 21	Angels	5–2	Vázquez (4–7)	Santana (3–8)	Núñez (20)	17,344	33–41
75	June 22	Angels	5–6 (10)	Walden (1–1)	Badenhop (1–1)	Kohn (1)	19,721	33–42
76*	June 24	Mariners	1–5	Hernández (8–6)	Nolasco (4–4)		15,279	33–43
77*	June 25	Mariners	4–2	Volstad (3–7)	Vargas (5–5)	Núñez (21)	16,896	34–43
78*	June 26	Mariners	1–2 (10)	Pauley (5–1)	Choate (0–1)	League (21)	10,925	34–44
79	June 28	@ Athletics	0–1	Gonzalez (7–5)	Vázquez (4–8)	Bailey (6)	12,124	34–45
80	June 29	@ Athletics	3–0	Nolasco (5–4)	Moscoso (2–4)		17,006	35–45
81	June 30	@ Athletics	5–4	Volstad (4–7)	Cahill (8–6)	Núñez (22)	18,395	36–45
*=Played at Safeco Field in Seattle, Washington.

July (17–10)

#	Date	Opponent	Score	Win	Loss	Save	Attendance	Record
82	July 1	@ Rangers	5–15	Ogando (8–3)	Sánchez (6–2)		32,474	36–46
83	July 2	@ Rangers	9–5	Cishek (1–1)	Holland (6–4)		29,728	37–46
84	July 3	@ Rangers	6–4	Dunn (5–5)	Lowe (2–2)	Núñez (23)	46,092	38–46
85	July 4	Phillies	0–1	Worley (4–1)	Nolasco (5–5)	Bastardo (5)	27,103	38–47
86	July 5	Phillies	2–14	Hamels (10–4)	Volstad (4–8)		17,333	38–48
87	July 6	Phillies	7–6 (10)	Mujica (6–2)	Báez (2–4)		16,123	39–48
88	July 7	Astros	5–0	Hand (1–3)	Happ (3–11)		17,044	40–48
89	July 8	Astros	6–3	Vázquez (5–8)	Lyles (0–4)	Núñez (24)	17,044	41–48
90	July 9	Astros	6–1	Nolasco (6–5)	Myers (3–9)		20,402	42–48
91	July 10	Astros	5–4	Volstad (5–8)	W. Rodríguez (6–6)	Núñez (25)	17,123	43–48
92	July 14	@ Cubs	6–3	Mujica (7–2)	Mármol (2–3)		38,145	44–48
93	July 15	@ Cubs	1–2	Dempster (7–6)	Nolasco (6–6)	Marshall (2)	38,391	44–49
94	July 16	@ Cubs	13–3	Vázquez (6–8)	Zambrano (6–5)		40,709	45–49
95	July 17	@ Cubs	7–5	Mujica (8–2)	Wood (1–5)	Núñez (26)	37,634	46–49
96	July 18	@ Mets	4–1	Hensley (1–2)	Capuano (8–9)	Núñez (27)	32,411	47–49
97	July 19	Padres	0–4	Stauffer (6–6)	Sánchez (6–3)	Bell (27)	17,101	47–50
98	July 20	Padres	3–14	Harang (8–2)	Nolasco (6–7)		19,142	47–51
99	July 21	Padres	3–5	Moseley (3–9)	Vázquez (6–9)	Bell (28)	27,143	47–52
100	July 22	Mets	6–7	Parnell (3–1)	Mujica (8–3)	Isringhausen (2)	21,304	47–53
101	July 23	Mets	8–5	Badenhop (2–1)	Capuano (8–10)		26,345	48–53
102	July 24	Mets	5–4	Choate (1–1)	Parnell (3–2)	Núñez (28)	20,416	49–53
103	July 26	@ Nationals	11–2	Nolasco (7–7)	Zimmermann (6–9)		24,650	50–53
104	July 27	@ Nationals	7–5	Vázquez(7–9)	Hernández (5–10)	Núñez (29)	21,974	51–53
105	July 28	@ Nationals	5–2	Sanches (4–1)	Lannan (7–7)		24,153	52–53
106	July 29	@ Braves	0–5	Beachy (4–2)	Hensley (1–3)		36,063	52–54
107	July 30	@ Braves	1–5	Hudson (10–7)	Sánchez(6–4)		40,656	52–55
108	July 31	@ Braves	3–1	Nolasco (8–7)	Hanson (11–6)	Núñez (30)	23,085	53–55

August (7–20)

#	Date	Opponent	Score	Win	Loss	Save	Attendance	Record
109	August 1	@ Mets	7–3 (10)	Núñez (1–2)	Isringhausen (2–1)		28,862	54–55
110	August 2	@ Mets	4–3	Cishek (2–1)	Isringhausen (2–2)	Núñez (31)	33,297	55–55
–	August 3	@ Mets	Postponed (rain); Makeup: August 29 as part of a doubleheader					
111	August 4	Cardinals	4–7	McClellan (9–6)	Hensley (1–4)	Salas (20)	20,011	55–56
112	August 5	Cardinals	2–3	Boggs (1–3)	Sánchez(6–5)	Lynn (1)	19,303	55–57
113	August 6	Cardinals	1–2	Carpenter (7–8)	Nolasco (8–8)	Salas (21)	23,922	55–58
114	August 7	Cardinals	4–8	Boggs (2–3)	Dunn (5–6)		20,011	55–59
115	August 8	Braves	5–8	Lowe (7–10)	Hand (1–4)	Kimbrel (35)	20,330	55–60
116	August 9	Braves	3–4 (11)	Sherrill (3–1)	Mujica (8–4)	Kimbrel (36)	21,337	55–61
117	August 10	Braves	2–6	Hudson (12–7)	Sánchez (6–6)	Venters (4)	22,104	55–62
118	August 12	Giants	2–1	Nolasco (9–8)	Cain (9–9)	Núñez (32)	22,431	56–62
119	August 13	Giants	0–3	Lincecum (11–9)	Vázquez(7–10)	Wilson (35)	25,013	56–63
120	August 14	Giants	2–5	Vogelsong (10–2)	Volstad (5–9)	Ramírez (2)	20,020	56–64
121	August 15	@ Rockies	4–7	Belisle (7–4)	Núñez (1–3)		32,175	56–65
122	August 16	@ Rockies	6–5	Sánchez (7–6)	Chacín (9–10)	Núñez (33)	36,136	57–65
123	August 17	@ Rockies	5–12	Chacín (9–10)	Nolasco (9–9)		33,522	57–66
124	August 18	@ Padres	1–3	Stauffer (8–9)	Vázquez(7–11)	Bell (33)	18,403	57–67
125	August 19	@ Padres	3–4	LeBlanc (2–2)	Volstad (5–10)	Bell (34)	26,065	57–68
126	August 20	@ Padres	1–14	Harang (12–3)	Hensley (1–5)		37,268	57–69
127	August 21	@ Padres	3–4	Bell (3–4)	Mujica (8–5)		40,065	57–70
128	August 23	Reds	6–8	Chapman (3–1)	Núñez (1–4)	Cordero (27)	21,204	57–71
129	August 24	Reds	6–5	Webb (2–4)	Arredondo (3–4)	Cishek (2)	N/A	58–71
130	August 24	Reds	2–3	Arroyo (8–10)	Volstad (5–11)	Cordero (28)	22,505	58–72
–	August 25	Reds	Postponed; Played on 8/24					
131	August 26	@ Phillies	6–5	Hensley (1–5)	Oswalt (6–8)	Cishek (3)	45,523	59–72
–	August 27	@ Phillies	Postponed (Hurricane Irene); Makeup: September 15 as part of a doubleheader					
–	August 28	@ Phillies	Postponed (Hurricane Irene); Makeup: September 15 as part of a doubleheader					
132	August 29	@ Mets	1–2	Dickey (6–11)	Sánchez (7–7)	Parnell (2)	N/A	59–73
133	August 29	@ Mets	1–5	Gee (12–5)	Nolasco (9–10)		29,335	59–74
134	August 30	@ Mets	6–0	Vázquez (8–11)	Pelfrey (7–11)		30,806	60–74
135	August 31	@ Mets	2–3	Acosta (2–1)	Volstad (5–12)	Parnell (3)	27,905	60–75

September (12–15)

#	Date	Opponent	Score	Win	Loss	Save	Attendance	Record
136	September 1	@ Mets	5–7	Batista (4–2)	Hensley (2–6)	Parnell (4)	27,562	60–76
137	September 2	Phillies	3–5	Oswalt (7–8)	Hand (1–5)	Madson (27)	21,659	60–77
138	September 3	Phillies	8–4	Mujica (9–5)	Bastardo (6–1)		25,333	61–77
139	September 4	Phillies	5–4 (14)	Hensley (3–6)	Herndon (1–3)		21,234	62–77
140	September 5	Mets	9–3	Vázquez (9–11)	Capuano (10–12)		21,112	63–77
141	September 6	Mets	4–7 (12)	Igarashi (4–1)	Ceda (0–1)	Stinson (1)	22,318	63–78
142	September 7	Mets	0–1	Dickey (8–11)	Hand (1–6)	Acosta (1)	21,303	63–79
143	September 9	@ Pirates	13–4	Nolasco (10–10)	Ohlendorf (0–2)		24,527	64–79
144	September 10	@ Pirates	3–0	Sánchez (8–7)	Locke (0–1)		34,063	65–79
145	September 11	@ Pirates	4–1	Vázquez (10–11)	McDonald (9–8)	Núñez (34)	19,071	66–79
146	September 12	@ Braves	5–4 (12)	Hensley (4–6)	Varvaro (0–2)	Núñez (35)	17,216	67–79
147	September 13	@ Braves	1–7	Moylan (2–1)	Hand (1–7)		22,707	67–80
148	September 14	@ Braves	1–4	O'Flaherty (2–4)	Nolasco (10–11)	Kimbrel (44)	22,245	67–81
149	September 15	@ Phillies	1–3	Kendrick (8–6)	Sánchez (8–8)	Madson (31)	44,216	67–82
150	September 15	@ Phillies	1–2 (10)	Schwimer (1–0)	Badenhop (2–2)		44,950	67–83
151	September 16	@ Nationals	3–0	Vázquez (11–11)	Lannan (9–13)		22,932	68–83
152	September 17	@ Nationals	4–1 (13)	Hensley (5–6)	Balester (1–4)	Núñez (36)	33,247	69–83
153	September 18	@ Nationals	3–4	Wang (3–3)	Hand (1–8)	Storen (38)	26,581	69–84
154	September 19	Braves	6–5	Hensley (6–6)	Kimbrel (4–3)		21,640	70–84
155	September 20	Braves	0–4	Delgado (1–1)	Sánchez (8–9)		21,733	70–85
156	September 21	Braves	4–0	Vázquez (12–11)	Lowe (9–16)		22,240	71–85
157	September 23	@ Brewers	1–4	Rodríguez (6–2)	Hensley (6–7)	Axford (44)	44,584	71–86
158	September 24	@ Brewers	4–6	Hawkins (2–1)	Badenhop (2–3)	Axford (45)	44,520	71–87
159	September 25	@ Brewers	5–9	Narveson (11–8)	Nolasco (10–12)		43,347	71–88
160	September 26	Nationals	4–6	Severino (1–0)	Mujica (9–6)	Rodriguez (2)	21,058	71–89
161	September 27	Nationals	3–2	Vázquez (13–11)	Slaten (0–2)		21,902	72–89
162	September 28	Nationals	1–3	Strasburg (1–1)	Volstad (5–13)	Storen (43)	34,615	72–90

=== Roster ===
2011 Florida Marlins
Roster
Pitchers: 31 Burke Badenhop; 53 Jay Buente; 50 José Ceda; 38 Randy Choate; 66 Steven Cishek; 40 Michael Dunn; 52 Brad Hand; 39 Chris Hatcher; 32 Clay Hensley; 55 Josh Johnson; 34 Edward Mujica; 47 Ricky Nolasco; 46 Leo Núñez; 53 Sandy Rosario; 59 Alex Sanabia; 44 Brian Sanches; 19 Aníbal Sánchez; 23 Javier Vázquez; 37 Elih Villanueva; 41 Chris Volstad; 58 Ryan Webb	Catchers: 21 John Baker; 14 John Buck; 9 Brett Hayes; Infielders: 1 Emilio Bonifacio; 29 Greg Dobbs; 54 Matt Dominguez; 18 Wes Helms; 13 Omar Infante; 56 Osvaldo Martínez; 22 Donnie Murphy; 11 José López; 2 Hanley Ramírez; 15 Gaby Sánchez; 3 Joe Thurston	Outfielders: 6 Alfredo Amézaga; 24 Mike Cameron; 8 Chris Coghlan; 33 Scott Cousins; 20 Logan Morrison; 16 Bryan Petersen; 43 Vinny Rottino; 27 Mike Stanton; 10 DeWayne Wise	Manager: 25 Jack McKeon; 36 Edwin Rodríguez; Coaches: 51 Randy St. Claire (pitching); 49 Reid Cornelius (bullpen); 4 Joey Espada (third base); 7 Perry Hill (first base); 17 Brandon Hyde (bench); 30 Eduardo Pérez (hitting); 75 Jeff Urgelles (bullpen catcher)

== Player stats ==
=== Batting ===
Note: G = Games played; AB = At bats; R = Runs scored; H = Hits; 2B = Doubles; 3B = Triples; HR = Home runs; RBI = Runs batted in; AVG = Batting average; SB = Stolen bases

Player	G	AB	R	H	2B	3B	HR	RBI	AVG	SB
Alfredo Amezaga, 2B, LF	20	44	1	6	0	0	0	2	.136	0
Burke Badenhop, P	45	7	1	2	1	0	0	1	.286	0
John Baker, C	16	13	0	2	0	0	0	1	.154	0
Emilio Bonifacio, SS, OF, 3B, 2B	152	565	78	167	26	7	5	36	.296	40
John Buck, C	140	466	41	106	15	1	16	57	.227	0
Jay Buente, P	1	1	0	0	0	0	0	0	.000	0
Mike Cameron, CF	45	143	18	34	8	0	6	18	.238	1
Chris Coghlan, OF	65	269	33	62	20	1	5	22	.230	7
Scott Cousins, OF	48	52	5	7	1	0	1	4	.135	1
Greg Dobbs, 3B, 1B, RF	134	411	38	113	23	0	8	49	.275	0
Matt Dominguez, 3B	17	45	2	11	4	0	0	2	.244	0
Michael Dunn, P	69	1	0	0	0	0	0	0	.000	0
Brad Hand, P	10	17	1	2	0	0	0	1	.118	0
Brett Hayes, C	64	130	19	30	9	0	5	16	.231	0
Wes Helms, 3B	69	110	10	21	5	0	0	6	.191	0
Clay Hensley, P	37	14	0	0	0	0	0	0	.000	0
Omar Infante, 2B	148	579	55	160	24	8	7	49	.276	4
Josh Johnson, P	9	19	1	3	0	0	0	4	.158	0
José López, 3B, 2B, 1B	44	106	13	24	8	0	6	13	.226	0
Ozzie Martinez, SS	20	23	0	3	0	0	0	1	.130	0
Logan Morrison, LF	123	462	54	114	25	4	23	72	.247	2
Edward Mujica, P	64	1	0	0	0	0	0	0	.000	0
Donnie Murphy, 3B, SS	36	92	10	17	4	1	2	9	.185	0
Ricky Nolasco, P	31	56	5	5	2	0	0	1	.089	0
Leo Nunez, P	65	1	0	0	0	0	0	0	.000	0
Bryan Petersen, OF	74	204	18	54	13	3	2	10	.265	7
Hanley Ramírez, SS	92	338	55	82	16	0	10	45	.243	20
Vinny Rottino, OF	8	12	1	2	0	0	0	0	.167	0
Alex Sanabia, P	3	3	0	0	0	0	0	0	.000	0
Brian Sanches, P	37	5	0	1	0	0	0	0	.200	0
Aníbal Sánchez, P	31	57	1	7	0	0	0	3	.123	0
Gaby Sánchez, 1B	159	572	72	152	35	0	19	78	.266	3
Mike Stanton, RF	150	516	79	135	30	5	34	87	.262	5
Joe Thurston, 2B	1	4	0	1	0	0	0	0	.250	1
Javier Vázquez, P	34	56	5	10	1	0	0	2	.179	0
Elih Villanueva, P	1	1	0	0	0	0	0	0	.000	0
Chris Volstad, P	27	46	3	9	2	0	0	2	.196	0
DeWayne Wise, OF	49	67	6	16	2	0	0	5	.239	4
Team totals	162	5508	625	1358	274	30	149	596	.247	95

=== Pitching ===
Note: W = Wins; L = Losses; ERA = Earned run average; G = Games pitched; GS = Games started; SV = Saves; IP = Innings pitched; H = Hits allowed; R = Runs allowed; ER = Earned runs allowed; BB = Walks allowed; K = Strikeouts

Player	W	L	ERA	G	GS	SV	IP	H	R	ER	BB	K
Burke Badenhop	2	3	4.10	50	0	1	63.2	65	29	29	24	51
Jay Buente	0	1	9.00	1	1	0	3.0	5	4	3	3	1
José Ceda	0	1	4.43	17	0	0	20.1	16	11	10	12	21
Randy Choate	1	1	1.82	54	0	0	24.2	13	7	5	13	31
Steve Cishek	2	1	2.63	45	0	3	54.2	45	18	16	19	55
Michael Dunn	5	6	3.43	72	0	0	63.0	51	28	24	31	68
Brad Hand	1	8	4.20	12	12	0	60.0	53	32	28	35	38
Chris Hatcher	0	0	6.97	11	0	0	10.1	14	8	8	4	8
Clay Hensley	6	7	5.19	37	9	0	67.2	62	41	39	30	46
Josh Johnson	3	1	1.64	9	9	0	60.1	39	13	11	20	56
Edward Mujica	9	6	2.96	67	0	0	76.0	64	27	25	14	63
Ricky Nolasco	10	12	4.67	33	33	0	206.0	244	117	107	44	148
Leo Núñez	1	4	4.06	68	0	36	64.1	57	30	29	21	55
Bryan Petersen	0	0	0.00	1	0	0	1.0	0	0	0	1	0
Sandy Rosario	0	0	2.45	4	0	0	3.2	5	1	1	2	2
Alex Sanabia	0	0	3.27	3	2	0	11.0	13	4	4	3	8
Brian Sanches	4	1	3.94	39	2	0	61.2	52	32	27	36	53
Aníbal Sánchez	8	9	3.67	32	32	0	196.1	187	85	80	64	202
Javier Vázquez	13	11	3.69	32	32	0	192.2	178	91	79	50	162
Elih Villanueva	0	1	24.00	1	1	0	3.0	5	8	8	5	2
Chris Volstad	5	13	4.89	29	29	0	165.2	187	96	90	49	117
Ryan Webb	2	4	3.20	53	0	0	50.2	48	20	18	20	31
Team totals	72	90	3.95	162	162	40	1459.2	1403	702	640	500	1218

== Farm system ==
Level	Team	League	Manager
AAA	New Orleans Zephyrs	Pacific Coast League	Greg Norton
AA	Jacksonville Suns	Southern League	Andy Barkett
A	Jupiter Hammerheads	Florida State League	Ron Hassey
A	Greensboro Grasshoppers	South Atlantic League	Andy Haines
A-Short Season	Jamestown Jammers	New York–Penn League	Dave Berg
Rookie	GCL Marlins	Gulf Coast League	Jorge Hernández

LEAGUE CHAMPIONS: Greensboro
