= Gaby Sánchez =

American baseball player (born 1983)

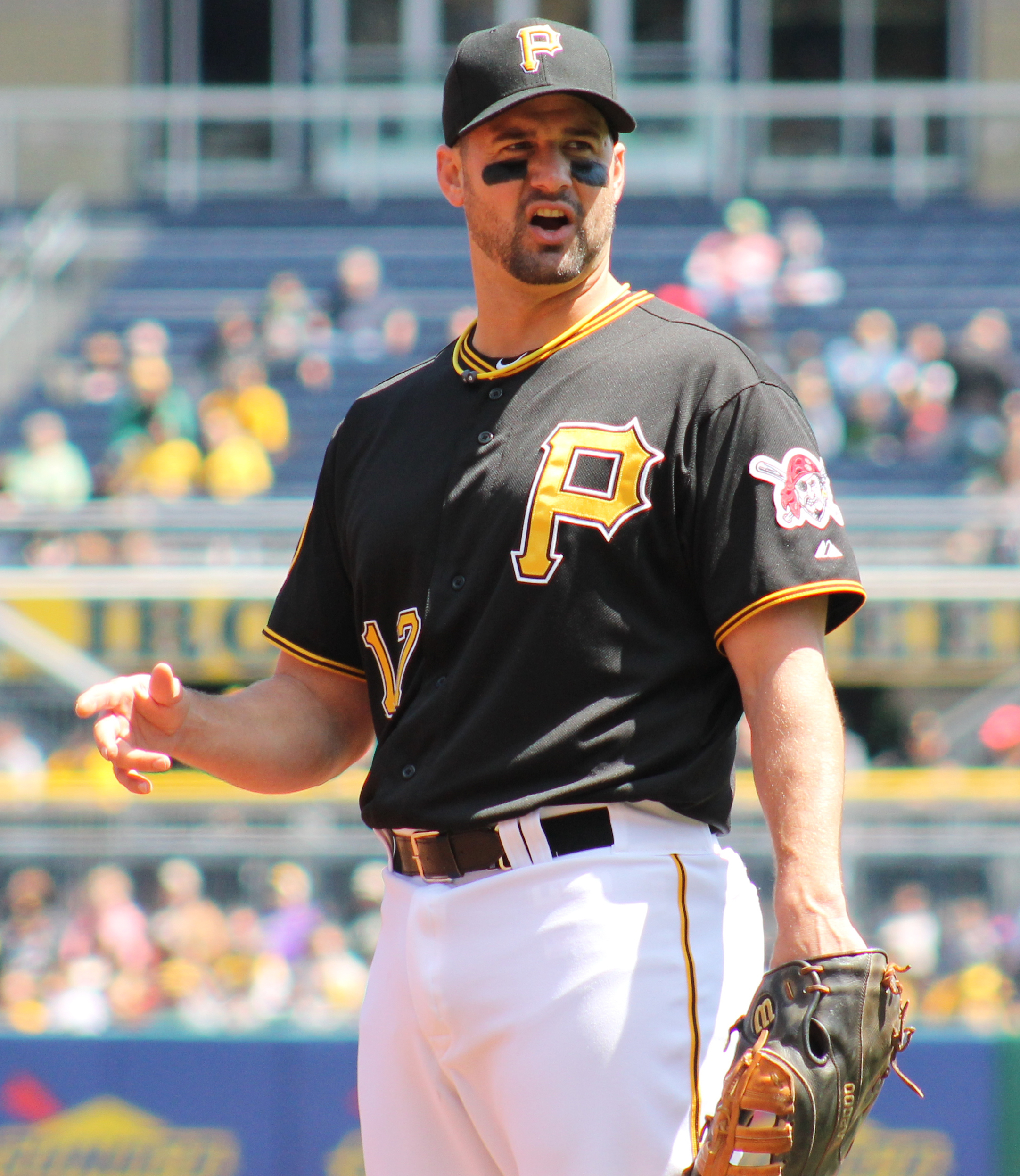
- Sánchez with the Pittsburgh Pirates in 2014
- First baseman
- Born: September 2, 1983 (age 42); Miami, Florida, U.S.
- Batted: Right Threw: Right

Professional debut
- MLB: September 17, 2008, for the Florida Marlins
- NPB: March 27, 2015, for the Tohoku Rakuten Golden Eagles

Last appearance
- MLB: September 28, 2014, for the Pittsburgh Pirates
- NPB: September 9, 2015, for the Tohoku Rakuten Golden Eagles

MLB statistics
- Batting average: .254
- Home runs: 61
- Runs batted in: 266

NPB statistics
- Batting average: .226
- Home runs: 7
- Runs batted in: 18
- Stats at Baseball Reference

Teams
- Florida / Miami Marlins (2008–2012); Pittsburgh Pirates (2012–2014); Tohoku Rakuten Golden Eagles (2015)

Career highlights and awards
- All-Star (2011)

Gabriel Sánchez (born September 2, 1983) is an American former professional baseball first baseman. He played in Major League Baseball (MLB) for the Florida/Miami Marlins and Pittsburgh Pirates, and in Nippon Professional Baseball (NPB) for the Tohoku Rakuten Golden Eagles. He played college baseball at the University of Miami.

== Amateur career ==
Sánchez was a 15th round pick (460th overall) of the Seattle Mariners out of Brito Miami Private School in the 2002 Major League Baseball draft, but chose to attend the University of Miami instead. In 2004, he played collegiate summer baseball with the Brewster Whitecaps of the Cape Cod Baseball League. He signed with the Florida Marlins after they selected him in the 4th round (126th overall) in 2005.

== Professional career ==
=== Florida/Miami Marlins ===
In his first professional season in 2005, Sánchez played mostly third base for the Jamestown Jammers. He made the Short-Season All-Star game as the designated hitter for Jamestown, and was also MVP of the All-Star Game in the New York–Penn League. In 2006, Sánchez played for the Single-A Greensboro Grasshoppers where he batted .317 with 14 home runs in 55 games before a promotion to Triple-A Albuquerque. In 2007, Sánchez played for Single-A Advanced Jupiter; he batted .279, but hit only 9 home runs in 133 games. In 2008, he batted .314 with 17 home runs and 92 RBI for Double-A Carolina en route to winning the Southern League Most Valuable Player Award.

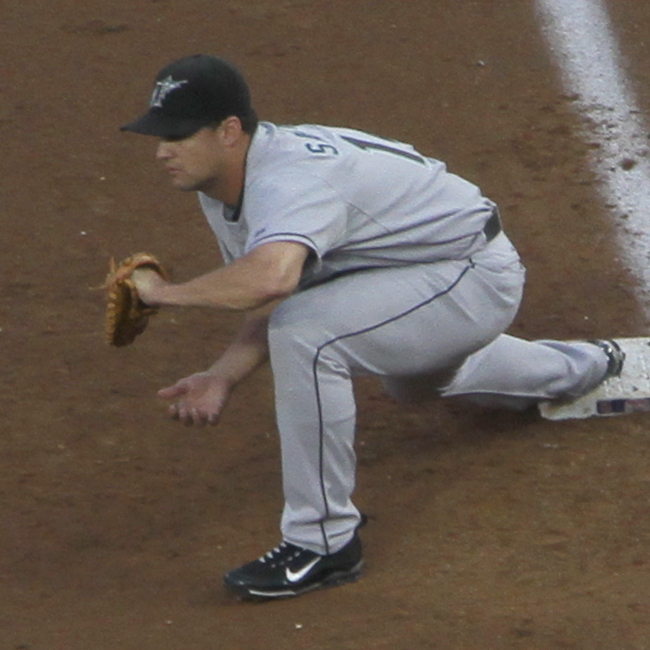
Sanchez with the Marlins in 2010.

On September 14, 2008, Sánchez was called up to the majors and made his debut on September 17. He attended the Marlins' 2009 Spring training camp and competed with Jorge Cantú for the starting first baseman position; Sánchez struggled in the spring and was optioned to Triple-A New Orleans Zephyrs.

Entering the following year's spring training, he again had to compete to be the starter at first base. This time, it was with fellow prospect Logan Morrison. Sánchez earned the job on March 29, 2010 after Morrison was reassigned to the minors. On April 10, 2010, Sánchez hit his first home run of the 2010 season. He had his most successful game so far on June 11 in Interleague play against the Tampa Bay Rays, when he had four hits with two home runs and six RBIs.

He was involved in a bench-clearing brawl in the sixth inning of a 16–10 victory over the Washington Nationals at Sun Life Stadium on September 1, 2010. The ill will had spilled over from the previous night when Marlins catcher Brett Hayes suffered a dislocated left shoulder as a result of a collision with Nyjer Morgan at home plate. After hitting Morgan with a pitch, Morgan stole second and third base with a 9 run lead. This prompted starting pitcher Chris Volstad to throw a ball behind Nyjer in his next at-bat. Morgan charged the mound and delivered a left-handed punch at Volstad. Sánchez, who ran in from his position at first base to defend his teammate, then applied a right-arm clothesline to bring Morgan to the ground. Even though he wasn't ejected from the contest, Sánchez was given a three-game suspension two days later for his part in the fracas .

He was named to the Baseball America 2010 All-Rookie Team as a DH. He was also named the first baseman on the 2010 Topps Major League Rookie All-Star Team.

Sánchez changed his uniform number to 15 before the start of the 2011 season. He was the lone Marlins player at that year's All-Star Game.

On May 19, 2012, Sánchez was demoted to the New Orleans Zephyrs after an 0-for-3 day at the plate lowered his batting average to .197. On June 10, 2012, Sánchez was recalled to the Majors by the Marlins.

Although Sánchez improved since being called up, hitting two home runs with a batting average of .202, he was optioned to the Zephyrs to make room for newly acquired Carlos Lee, even though he hit a home run in the ninth inning with two outs and two strikes to tie the game that same day.

=== Pittsburgh Pirates ===
On July 31, 2012, Sánchez was traded to the Pittsburgh Pirates along with pitcher Kyle Kaminsky for outfielder Gorkys Hernández and a competition balanced 2013 draft pick. On August 28, 2013, Sanchez changed his number to 17 so his new teammate, John Buck, could wear number 14. He was designated for assignment on December 1, 2014.

=== Tohoku Rakuten Golden Eagles ===
On January 8, 2015, the Tohoku Rakuten Golden Eagles of Japan's Nippon Professional Baseball announced that they had signed Sánchez to a one-year, $2.5 million, contract.

=== Seattle Mariners ===
On January 22, 2016, Sánchez signed a minor league deal with the Seattle Mariners. He was released on March 13, 2016.

== Personal life ==
The son of Cuban immigrants, Sánchez speaks fluent Spanish. He married Miami Herald sports reporter Judy Erwin in Naples, Florida on January 9, 2010.
