= Nyjer Morgan =

American baseball player (born 1980)

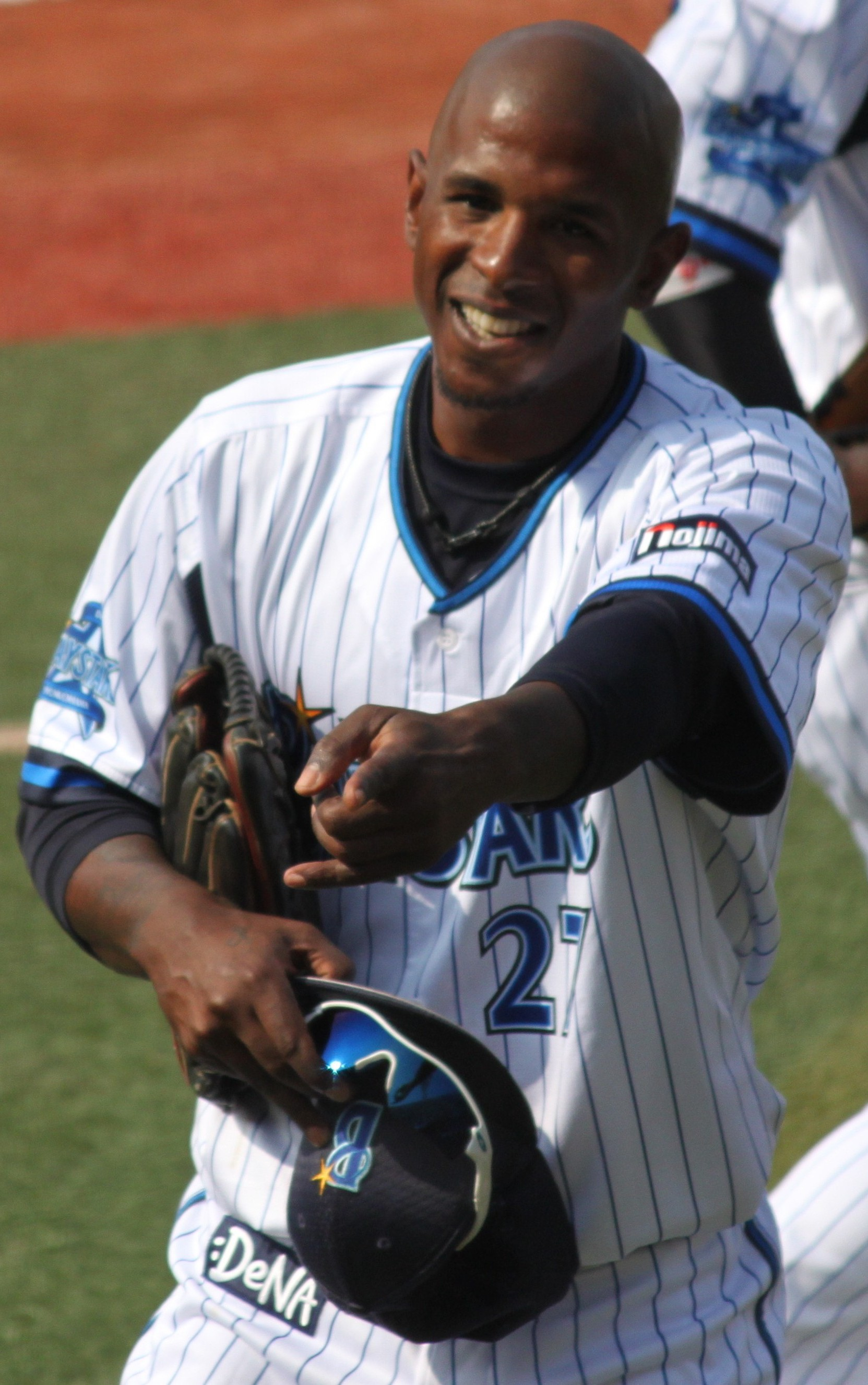
- Morgan with the Yokohama DeNA BayStars in 2013
- Outfielder
- Born: July 2, 1980 (age 46); San Francisco, California, U.S.
- Batted: Left Threw: Left

Professional debut
- MLB: September 1, 2007, for the Pittsburgh Pirates
- NPB: March 28, 2013, for the Yokohama DeNA BayStars
- KBO: March 29, 2015, for the Hanwha Eagles

Last appearance
- NPB: September 19, 2013, for the Yokohama DeNA BayStars
- MLB: May 14, 2014, for the Cleveland Indians
- KBO: April 10, 2015, for the Hanwha Eagles

MLB statistics
- Batting average: .282
- Home runs: 12
- Runs batted in: 136
- Stolen bases: 120

NPB statistics
- Batting average: .294
- Home runs: 11
- Runs batted in: 50

KBO statistics
- Batting average: .273
- Home runs: 0
- Runs batted in: 5
- Stats at Baseball Reference

Teams
- Pittsburgh Pirates (2007–2009); Washington Nationals (2009–2010); Milwaukee Brewers (2011–2012); Yokohama DeNA BayStars (2013); Cleveland Indians (2014); Hanwha Eagles (2015)

Nyjer Jamid Morgan (born July 2, 1980) is an American former professional baseball outfielder. He played in Major League Baseball (MLB) for the Pittsburgh Pirates, Washington Nationals, Milwaukee Brewers, and Cleveland Indians, in Nippon Professional Baseball (NPB) for the Yokohama DeNA BayStars, and in the KBO League for the Hanwha Eagles. Morgan mainly played center field during his MLB career.

In his youth Morgan played ice hockey, reaching the Major Junior level with the Regina Pats of the Western Hockey League in 1999–2000. Following that season, Morgan turned his focus exclusively to baseball and was drafted by the Pirates in the 33rd round of the 2002 MLB draft.

== Early life ==
Morgan was born in San Francisco. When he was seven years old, he became interested in playing ice hockey after watching the ice hockey tournament at the 1988 Winter Olympics on television. When Morgan was 16, after playing in numerous tournaments across the United States and Canada, he was recruited by the Vernon Vipers of the British Columbia Hockey League (BCHL).

Although Morgan did not make the Vipers' team after participating in its training camp, he played two games with the team during the 1996–97 season as an affiliate player in which he recorded ten penalty minutes. He spent the remainder of the 1996–97 season with the North Okanagan Knights of the Kootenay International Junior Hockey League. The following season, he played for the Nelson Leafs of the Rocky Mountain Junior Hockey League. During the 1998–99 season, Morgan again played for a new team, this time for the Delta Ice Hawks of the Pacific International Junior Hockey League.

The following season, Morgan made the transition from the junior "B" Ice Hawks to the major junior Regina Pats of the Western Hockey League (WHL). In seven games with the Pats during the 1999–2000 WHL season, Morgan scored two goals and recorded 20 penalty minutes. Both of his goals were scored in his first career WHL game, after which he was named the first star of the game. Following his seven games with the Pats, Morgan was released and joined the Prince George Spruce Kings of the BCHL for three games in which he scored one assist and 15 penalty minutes.

== Baseball career ==
=== Pittsburgh Pirates ===
The Pittsburgh Pirates selected Morgan in the 33rd round of the 2002 Major League Baseball draft.

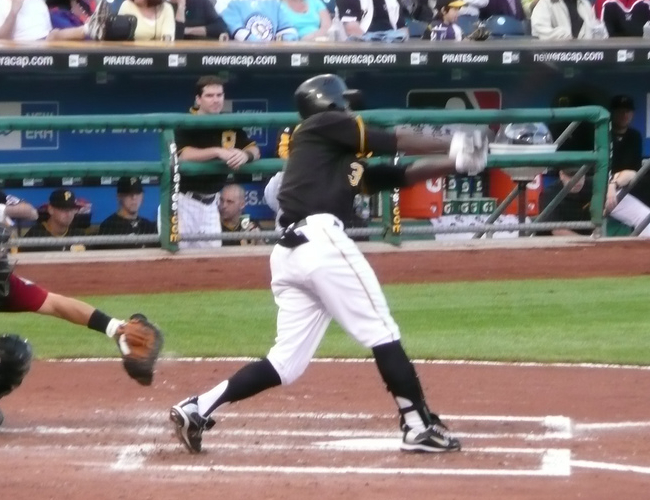
Morgan batting for the Pittsburgh Pirates in 2009

On September 1, 2007, Morgan made his major league debut for the Pirates against the Milwaukee Brewers as a late-season call-up. On September 14, 2007, Morgan made a catch in Minute Maid Park's center field that proved the difference in a 4–3 Pirates win. Houston Astros manager Cecil Cooper said of the catch "That's probably the best catch I've seen this year". The catch garnered references to Willie Mays' The Catch on SportsCenter the following day. Morgan also showed his tools against the San Diego Padres on September 20, going 2 for 3 with a triple, two runs scored, two stolen bases, and an outfield assist throwing out Scott Hairston. Morgan's first home run came September 25 against the Arizona Diamondbacks.

Morgan was expected to make the 2008 roster as the Pirates' starting center fielder, but lost the position battle to Nate McLouth during spring training. After a poor start to the season, he was optioned to the Triple-A affiliate Indianapolis Indians. Morgan made several appearances for the Pirates, but spent most of his season in Indianapolis until a productive September call up to the parent club.

Morgan overcame an unimpressive spring training in 2009 to claim the job of starting left fielder. Building on his positive second half of 2008, he proved himself to be a fan favorite, often referring to left field as "Morgantown".

Although he stole 42 bases in 2009 (second in the league to Michael Bourn), he was caught 17 times—tied for the most in the majors.

=== Washington Nationals ===
On June 30, 2009, Morgan was traded to the Washington Nationals along with pitcher Sean Burnett in exchange for outfielder Lastings Milledge and pitcher Joel Hanrahan. On August 27, he fractured his hand sliding into third base, and was placed on the 15-day disabled list the following day

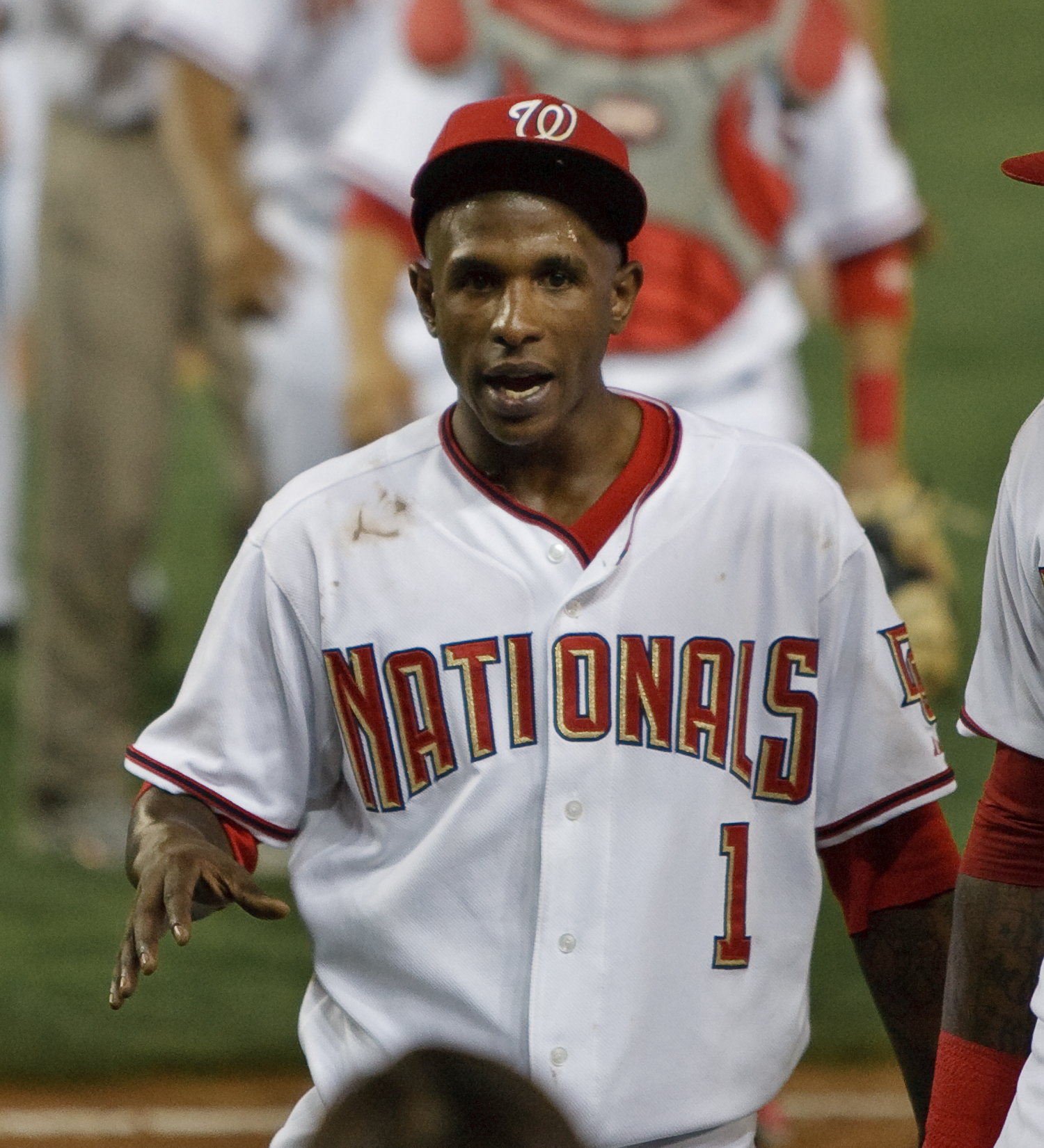
Morgan with the Washington Nationals in 2009

In a May 22, 2010, game against the Baltimore Orioles, Morgan, playing center field, jumped for a fly ball hit by Adam Jones which hit his glove and caromed away. Morgan thought he had knocked the ball over the fence for a home run, and reacted by angrily throwing his glove to the ground and walking away. Left fielder Josh Willingham retrieved the ball and threw it towards home plate, but not in time to prevent Jones from scoring on an inside-the-park home run. As he left the field at the end of the inning, Morgan heard a chorus of boos from the crowd.

On July 22, 2010, Morgan became the first Nationals player to steal three bases in one game. For the 2010 season, he was third in the league in steals (34), and led the league in the number of times caught stealing (17).

On August 25, 2010, Morgan was given a seven-game suspension for allegedly throwing a ball at a fan during a game against the Philadelphia Phillies at Citizens Bank Park; Morgan appealed the suspension. On August 31, Morgan ran into Marlins catcher Brett Hayes; the collision separated Hayes' shoulder. The next day, Morgan was hit by a pitch in the 4th inning, by Florida Marlins pitcher Chris Volstad. Later that night, Volstad threw a ball that went behind Morgan. Incensed by the pitch, Morgan charged the mound, taking a swing at Volstad before being clotheslined by Marlins first-baseman Gaby Sánchez, leading to a bench-clearing fight. MLB suspended Morgan for eight games and fined him an undisclosed amount. The suspension from the August 25 incident was overturned on appeal, while the suspension from the September 1 brawl was upheld on appeal, and Morgan started serving his eight-game suspension on September 17. The league also gave him a $15,000 fine in addition to the eight-game suspension. The incident came just days after Morgan ran into St. Louis Cardinals backup catcher Bryan Anderson in spite of the fact that the Cardinals catcher didn't have the ball and had stepped away from the plate. Morgan finished the 2010 season with a .253 average and 34 stolen bases, and led the National League in times caught stealing for the second year in a row.

=== Milwaukee Brewers ===
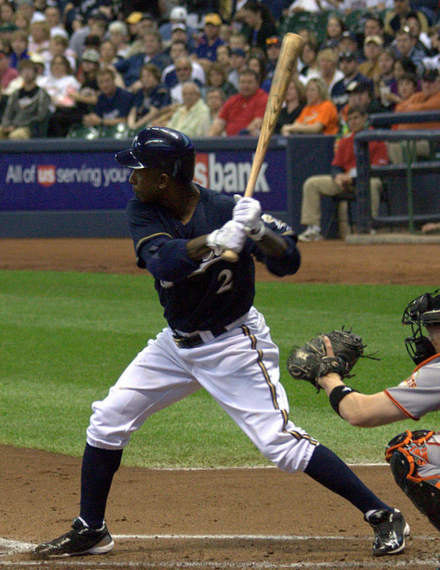
Morgan batting for the Milwaukee Brewers in 2011

On March 27, 2011, Morgan was traded to the Milwaukee Brewers in exchange for prospect Cutter Dykstra (son of baseball player Lenny Dykstra). Morgan fractured his middle finger in the 8th inning on a sacrifice bunt against Jonny Venters. After two separate stints on the disabled list, he joined Carlos Gómez in a platoon in center field with Gómez in the lineup versus left-handed pitchers and Morgan in the lineup versus righties. On June 8 against the New York Mets, Morgan recorded his first walk-off hit with a double down the right field line at Miller Park to win the game 7–6. After the game, Morgan said that he did not know it was a walk-off until he saw his teammates running out onto the field. In 2011, he batted .304 and was third in the NL in hit by pitch (14) and sacrifice hits (15).

On October 7, Morgan had a series-clinching walk-off base hit in the 10th inning of Game 5 of the NLDS against the Arizona Diamondbacks. The Brewers won the game 3–2, giving the Brewers their first playoff series win since 1982.

On January 16, 2012, Morgan signed a one-year, $2.35 million deal during his first run-through of arbitration eligibility. In the 2012 season, Morgan batted .239 in 122 games, with 12 stolen bases (and five times caught stealing). The Brewers did not offer Morgan a major-league contract for the 2013 season, and he refused an outright assignment to the Brewers' Triple-A affiliate, the Nashville Sounds.

While with the Brewers, Morgan reportedly referred to himself as "Tony Plush", which he described as his "name on the field" or his "gentleman's name".

=== Yokohama DeNA BayStars ===
In January 2013, Morgan signed a contract to play for the Yokohama DeNA BayStars of the Central League in Nippon Professional Baseball. He batted .294 with 11 home runs in 108 games for the BayStars.

=== Cleveland Indians ===
On January 14, 2014, Morgan announced that he had signed a minor league contract with an invitation to Spring training with the Cleveland Indians. Due to Michael Bourn starting the season on the disabled list, Morgan earned a spot on the 25-man roster and started the 2014 season as the starting center fielder and leadoff hitter, but suffered a right knee sprain on May 14 and was placed on the 60-day disabled list. On August 5, he was released.

=== Hanwha Eagles ===
In December 2014, he signed with the Hanwha Eagles of the KBO League on a one-year $700,000 contract.

=== Pericos de Puebla ===
In December 2015, Morgan signed with the Pericos de Puebla of the Mexican League. During the 2016 season, he hit for an average of .306 while stealing 22 bases and hitting 11 home runs. He was named to the Mexican League All-Star team, and Puebla won its first league championship in 30 years.

=== Acereros de Monclova ===
On February 21, 2017, Morgan, Chad Gaudin, Daric Barton, Manny Rodriguez, Rodolfo Amador, and Willy Taveras were traded to Acereros de Monclova in exchange for RHP Joaquín Lara. In 3 games for the Acereros, he went 1-for-9 (.111)

== Personal life ==
In 2011, Morgan created his own Twitter account, where he published wacky pictures such as himself dressed as a cowboy. With over 80,000 followers, he often tweeted after games using his catchphrase "AAAAAHHHH GOTTA GO!"

Morgan has one daughter, Niah, who was born in Regina, Saskatchewan, during his tenure with the Western Hockey League's Regina Pats. Morgan relinquished custody of Niah in order to pursue his athletic career. In 2017, Morgan had a son. On October 4, 2018, Morgan threw the first pitch of the NLDS at Miller Park on his son's first birthday; the Brewers won the game in a walk-off 3–2 over the Colorado Rockies. Exactly five years later, on October 4, 2023, Morgan was again invited back to Milwaukee to throw out the ceremonial first pitch before a playoff game against the Diamondbacks, which the Brewers went on to lose, ending their season.

On February 1, 2012, Morgan had the opportunity to join an on-ice practice with the San Jose Sharks of the National Hockey League. He said that it was "dream come true", and he received high praise from All-Star player Joe Thornton, who said that Morgan was "actually a pretty good skater."
