= Chris Volstad =

American baseball player (born 1986)

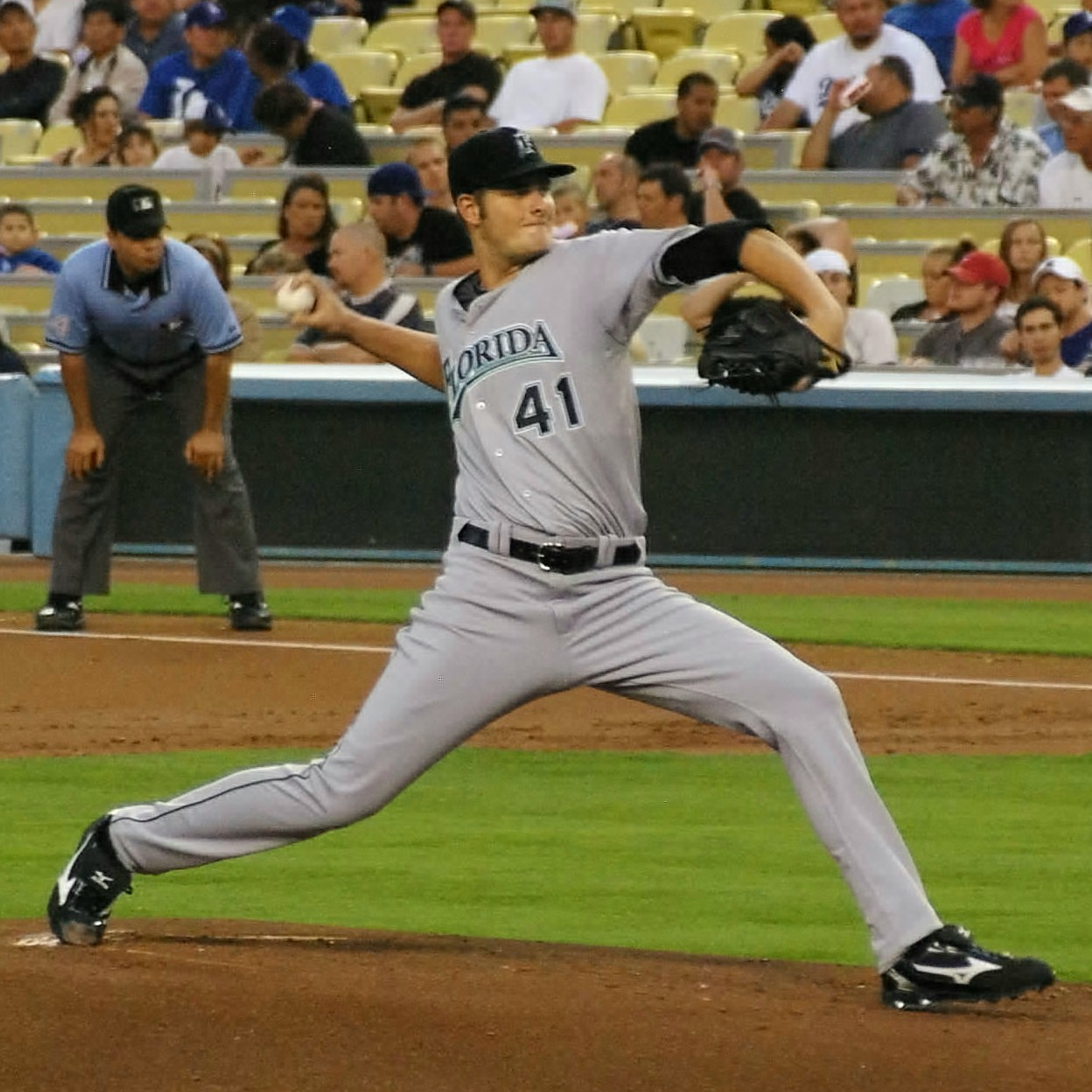
- Volstad with the Florida Marlins in 2008
- Pitcher
- Born: September 23, 1986 (age 40); Palm Beach Gardens, Florida, U.S.
- Batted: Right Threw: Right

Professional debut
- MLB: July 6, 2008, for the Florida Marlins
- KBO: April 2, 2014, for the Doosan Bears

Last appearance
- KBO: July 10, 2014, for the Doosan Bears
- MLB: July 26, 2018, for the Chicago White Sox

MLB statistics
- Win–loss record: 37–58
- Earned run average: 4.97
- Strikeouts: 481

KBO statistics
- Win–loss record: 5–7
- Earned run average: 6.21
- Strikeouts: 32
- Stats at Baseball Reference

Teams
- Florida Marlins (2008–2011); Chicago Cubs (2012); Colorado Rockies (2013); Doosan Bears (2014); Pittsburgh Pirates (2015); Chicago White Sox (2017–2018)

Christopher Kenneth Volstad (born September 23, 1986) is an American former professional baseball pitcher. He is a 2005 graduate of Palm Beach Gardens High School. He played in Major League Baseball (MLB) for the Florida Marlins, Chicago Cubs, Colorado Rockies, Pittsburgh Pirates, and Chicago White Sox, and in the KBO League for the Doosan Bears.

Volstad was drafted with the 16th pick in the 2005 Major League Baseball draft, the first of three first round picks for the Marlins that year.

== Amateur career ==
Volstad played in amateur baseball tournaments from a young age, winning the championship in a 12-and-under travel competition for a team representing Broward and Palm Beach counties, against a team representing California's Central Valley, at the Baseball Hall of Fame in Cooperstown, New York. David Adams was a teammate.

Volstad graduated from Palm Beach Gardens Community High School in 2005, pitching to a 7-2 win–loss record with one save and a 0.41 earned run average (ERA) in 10 games for the school's baseball team as a senior, striking out 98 batters and walking just eight in 69 innings pitched. He led his team deep into the regional playoffs, coming up one game short of States.

== Professional career ==
=== Florida Marlins ===
==== Minor leagues ====
In his first season of professional baseball, Volstad went 4-3 in 13 starts (with 55 strikeout in 65 innings pitched) between the rookie-level Gulf Coast League Marlins and Jamestown Jammers of the New York–Penn League (Low-A) with a 2.22 ERA.

Volstad never returned to Jamestown, instead starting out 2006 with the Greensboro Grasshoppers of the South Atlantic League (Single-A). He went 11-8 over 26 starts with a 3.08 ERA. Volstad was subsequently named the Marlins' #1 prospect in Baseball America's annual rankings.

Volstad started his second full pro season with the Jupiter Hammerheads of the Florida State League (High-A). He struggled somewhat compared to his first season and a half, going 8-9 in 21 games (20 starts) with a 4.50 ERA. However, in later action with Florida's Double-A affiliate, the Carolina Mudcats of the Southern League, Volstad improved to a 4-2 record and a 3.16 ERA.

In 2008, Volstad continued at Carolina, posting a 4-4 record, 3.36 ERA in 15 starts before being promoted to the major leagues.

==== Major leagues ====
On July 6, 2008, the Marlins purchased Volstad's contract and added him to the active roster. He made his major league debut the same day in a game against the Colorado Rockies, earning the win with two scoreless innings from the bullpen.

On July 11, Volstad started his first major league game against the Los Angeles Dodgers, earning the win and baffling the Dodger hitters with a 94 mph fastball and sharp 12-6 curveball. Volstad pitched 8 2/3 innings, and gave up 1 run on 5 hits, striking out 6. Volstad added his first major league hit in this game: a single off the Dodgers starter Eric Stults. On August 7, Volstad delivered a masterful performance against the NL East-leading Philadelphia Phillies to reduce their lead in the division to 1 1/2 games. He pitched 6 innings of shutout baseball, outdueling Cole Hamels of the Phillies.

On July 8, 2009, Volstad pitched what many could argue as the best game of his career. Against the San Francisco Giants, he pitched his first career complete game allowing only five hits and no runs; his win helped the Marlins avoid a sweep. In late August, he was sent to the Triple-A New Orleans Zephyrs after a 1 2/3 inning start against the San Diego Padres. Volstad made 29 starts for Miami during the regular season, compiling a 9-13 record and 5.21 ERA with 107 strikeouts over 159 innings of work.

In September 2010, Volstad was involved in a benches-clearing brawl against the Washington Nationals. In the day's previous game, the Nationals' Nyjer Morgan intentionally ran into Marlins' catcher Brett Hayes on a play at home plate where Morgan was called out. Hayes separated his shoulder and it was determined later that night that he would miss the remainder of the season. In Morgan's first at-bat, Volstad threw at Morgan, hitting him. Morgan proceeded to steal two bases when the Marlins had an almost double digit lead, breaking an unwritten rule of ethics in the game. Offended by Morgan once again, Volstad threw another pitch at Morgan in his next at-bat, with it going behind Morgan's back. He was promptly ejected for throwing at him, and Morgan then quickly charged the mound, despite the fact that Volstad stood nearly a foot taller than him. Morgan's punch connected, and Morgan was promptly knocked to the ground by Marlins' first baseman Gaby Sánchez, resulting in the brawl. After the game, Volstad sported a shiner from the Morgan punch. Volstad was suspended for 6 games because of the incident. He made 30 total starts for the Marlins during the 2010 campaign, registering a 12-9 record and 4.58 ERA with 102 strikeouts across 175 innings pitched.

Volstad made 29 starts for the Marlins in the 2011 season, posting a 5-13 record and 4.89 ERA with 117 strikeouts across 165 2/3 innings pitched.

=== Chicago Cubs ===
On January 5, 2012, the Marlins traded Volstad to the Chicago Cubs in exchange for Carlos Zambrano. On May 18, Volstad was optioned to the Triple-A Iowa Cubs after an 0-6 slump. On July 3, Volstad was recalled by the Cubs. He made a start later that day, giving up six runs over 4 1/3 innings, and getting the loss against the Atlanta Braves.

=== Colorado Rockies ===
On October 26, 2012, Volstad was claimed off of waivers by the Kansas City Royals. On November 20, Volstad was designated for assignment in order to clear room on the 40-man roster. He elected free agency on November 28.

On February 4, 2013, Volstad signed a minor league contract with the Colorado Rockies, with a chance to compete for a spot in the Colorado rotation. He had his contract selected to the major league roster on March 29. After allowing 10 runs in six games for the Rockies, Volstad was placed on waivers on June 20; he cleared waivers and was sent outright to Triple-A Colorado Springs Sky Sox on June 22. Volstad became a free agent on October 1.

=== Doosan Bears ===
On November 5, 2013, Volstad signed a minor league contract with the Los Angeles Angels of Anaheim. He was released on December 27.

On December 19, 2013, Volstad signed with the Doosan Bears of the KBO League. However, he was ineffective for the Bears, who released him at midseason.

=== Los Angeles Angels ===
On July 19, 2014, Volstad signed a minor league contract with the Los Angeles Angels. He became a free agent following the season on November 2.

=== Pittsburgh Pirates ===
On January 30, 2015, the Pittsburgh Pirates signed Volstad to a minor league contract. On June 24, the Pirates selected Volstad's contract, adding him to their active roster. That day, he pitched two scoreless relief innings for the team. Volstad was designated for assignment alongside José Tábata on June 28 to make room for Gorkys Hernández and Steve Lombardozzi Jr.; he cleared waivers and was sent outright to the Triple-A Indianapolis Indians on July 2. Volstad elected free agency following the season on October 5.

=== Chicago White Sox ===
On October 30, 2015, Volstad signed a minor league contract with the Atlanta Braves. He was released prior to the start of the season on March 12, 2016.

On March 24, 2016, Volstad signed a minor league contract with the Chicago White Sox. In 29 games (27 starts) for the Triple–A Charlotte Knights, he compiled an 8–11 record and 4.79 ERA with 84 strikeouts across 176 2/3 innings pitched. Volstad elected free agency following the season on November 7.

On December 24, 2016, Volstad re–signed with the White Sox on a new minor league contract. He was first called up by the White Sox on September 8, 2017, and made 6 appearances for the club, including 2 starts. On October 4, Volstad was removed from the 40-man roster and sent outright to Triple-A Charlotte.

On January 22, 2018, Volstad re-signed with Chicago on another minor league deal. His contract was selected by the White Sox on April 12. Volstad spent the majority of the season in the White Sox's bullpen, compiling the most innings he'd pitched in the majors since 2012. In 47 1/3 innings, he was 1-5 with a 6.27 ERA. Volstad was designated for assignment on July 27. He was released by the team on July 31.

On February 16, 2020, Volstad signed a minor league contract with the Cincinnati Reds. He was released prior to the start of the season.

== Pitching style ==
Volstad was a sinkerballer. He threw his sinker about half the time, averaging at 91 MPH. His secondary pitch was a mid-80s slider. He also featured a straight fastball, a curveball, and a changeup. He threw his changeup primarily to left-handed hitters, and his slider primarily to right-handed hitters.
