= Steve Cishek =

American baseball player (born 1986)

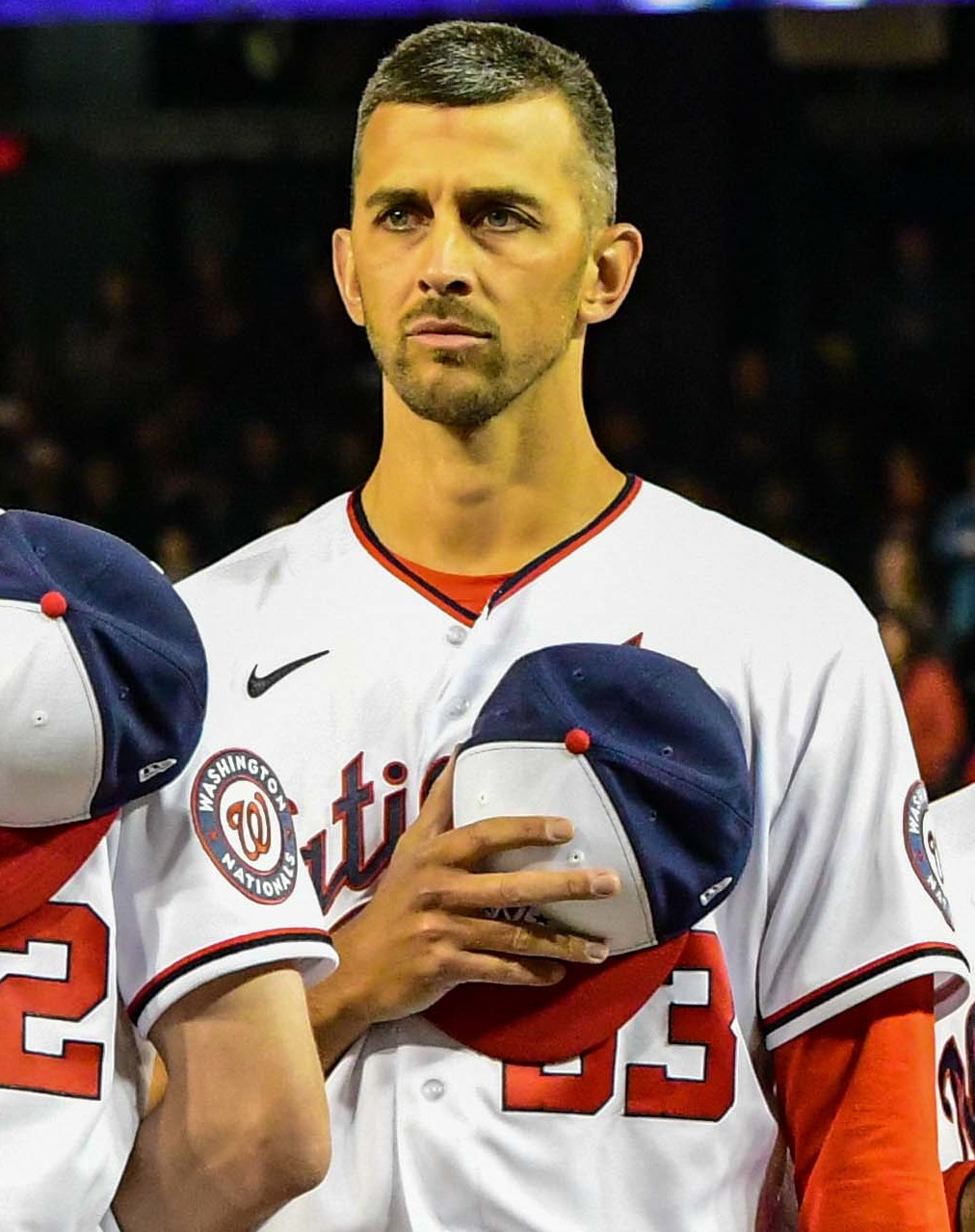
- Cishek with the Washington Nationals in 2022
- Pitcher
- Born: June 18, 1986 (age 40); Falmouth, Massachusetts, U.S.
- Batted: Right Threw: Right

MLB debut
- September 20, 2010, for the Florida Marlins

Last MLB appearance
- October 4, 2022, for the Washington Nationals

MLB statistics
- Win–loss record: 33–43
- Earned run average: 2.98
- Strikeouts: 743
- Saves: 133
- Stats at Baseball Reference

Teams
- Florida / Miami Marlins (2010–2015); St. Louis Cardinals (2015); Seattle Mariners (2016–2017); Tampa Bay Rays (2017); Chicago Cubs (2018–2019); Chicago White Sox (2020); Los Angeles Angels (2021); Washington Nationals (2022)

Steven Ryan Cishek (/siːˈʃɛk/) (born June 18, 1986) is an American former professional baseball pitcher. Cishek played in Major League Baseball (MLB) for the Florida / Miami Marlins, St. Louis Cardinals, Seattle Mariners, Tampa Bay Rays, Chicago Cubs, Chicago White Sox, Los Angeles Angels and Washington Nationals. He holds the Marlins franchise record for consecutive saves, with 33 in a row.

== Amateur career ==
Born and raised in Falmouth, Massachusetts, Cishek attended Falmouth High School where he starred as a pitcher and also played basketball. Not heavily recruited out of high school by Division I schools, Cishek attended Division II Carson-Newman College in Jefferson City, Tennessee, and led the team to a conference championship in 2007.

== Professional career ==
=== Florida / Miami Marlins ===
The Florida Marlins selected Cishek in the fifth round of the 2007 MLB draft. Cishek was called up to the MLB for the first time on September 20, 2010. He pitched 4 1/3 scoreless innings towards the end of the season.

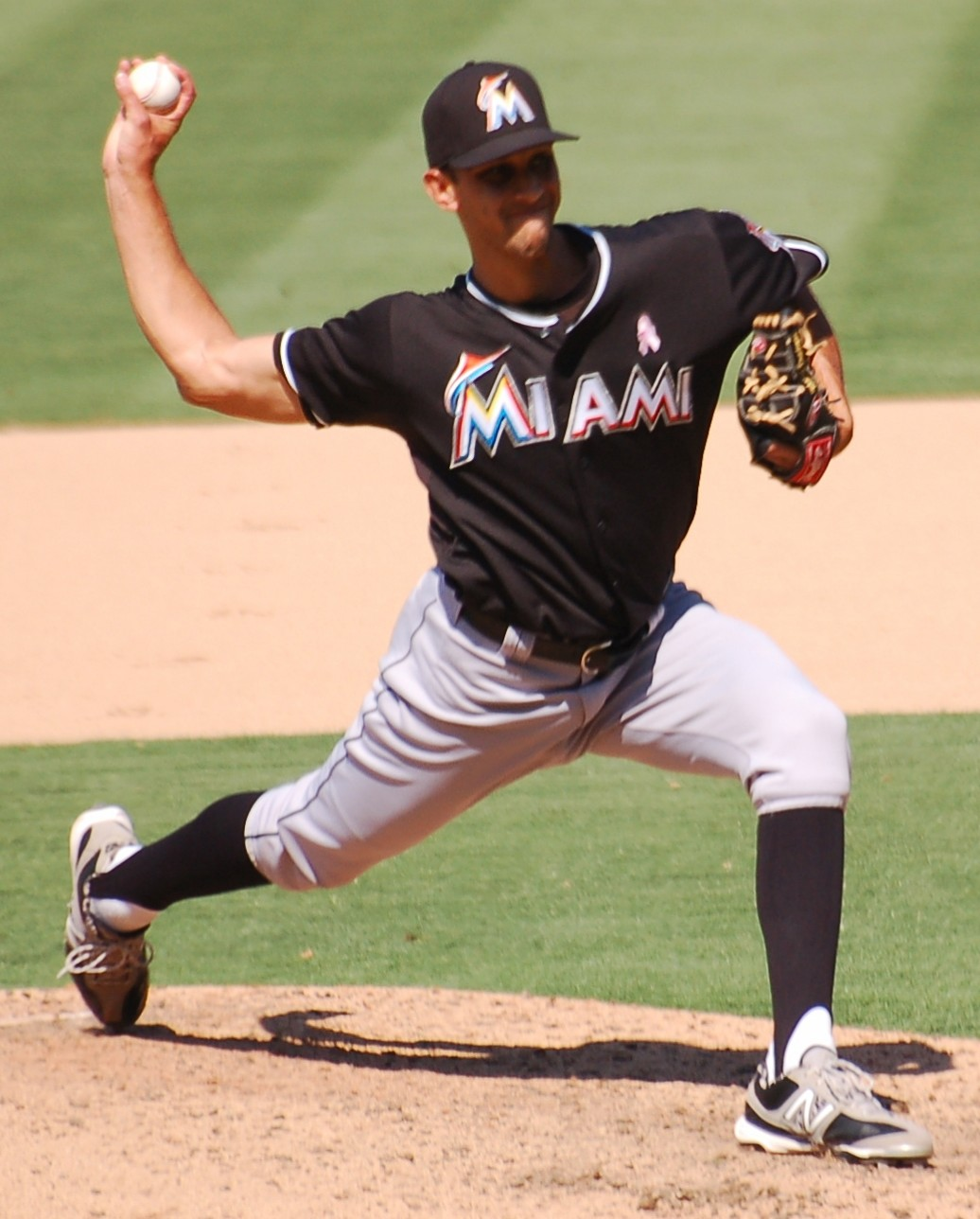
Cishek with the Miami Marlins in 2013

On May 24, 2011, Cishek was called up once again to join the Marlins after Jay Buente was designated for assignment. In 2012, Heath Bell was demoted as the team's closer and Cishek assumed the role for about a week. After a few relief appearances by Bell, he regained the closer's role. After about two months as the closer, Bell was demoted to a relief pitcher and Cishek took over the closer role again.

Cishek flourished in 2013, his first full season as Miami's closer, converting 34 of his 36 save opportunities, while posting a 2.33 ERA and 1.08 WHIP. He set an MLB record for most saves with a team that lost 100 games. He played with Miami again in 2014 and 2015. On June 1, 2015, Cishek was optioned to Double-A Jacksonville to work on his mechanics. To that point in the season, he had posted a 6.98 ERA with 17 strikeouts and 10 walks.

=== St. Louis Cardinals ===
On July 24, 2015, Cishek was traded to the St. Louis Cardinals for RHP Kyle Barraclough. He debuted for the Cardinals on July 26 in a 3–2 loss to the Atlanta Braves, pitching one scoreless inning but being charged with an error on a pickoff attempt. The Cardinals did not tender Cishek a contract for the 2016 season, making him a free agent.

=== Seattle Mariners ===
On December 14, 2015, Cishek agreed to a two-year contract worth $10 million with the Seattle Mariners. After going 25 for 31 in save opportunities, the Mariners removed Cishek as closer for a temporary basis. On August 5, he was placed on the disabled list with a hip injury.

=== Tampa Bay Rays ===
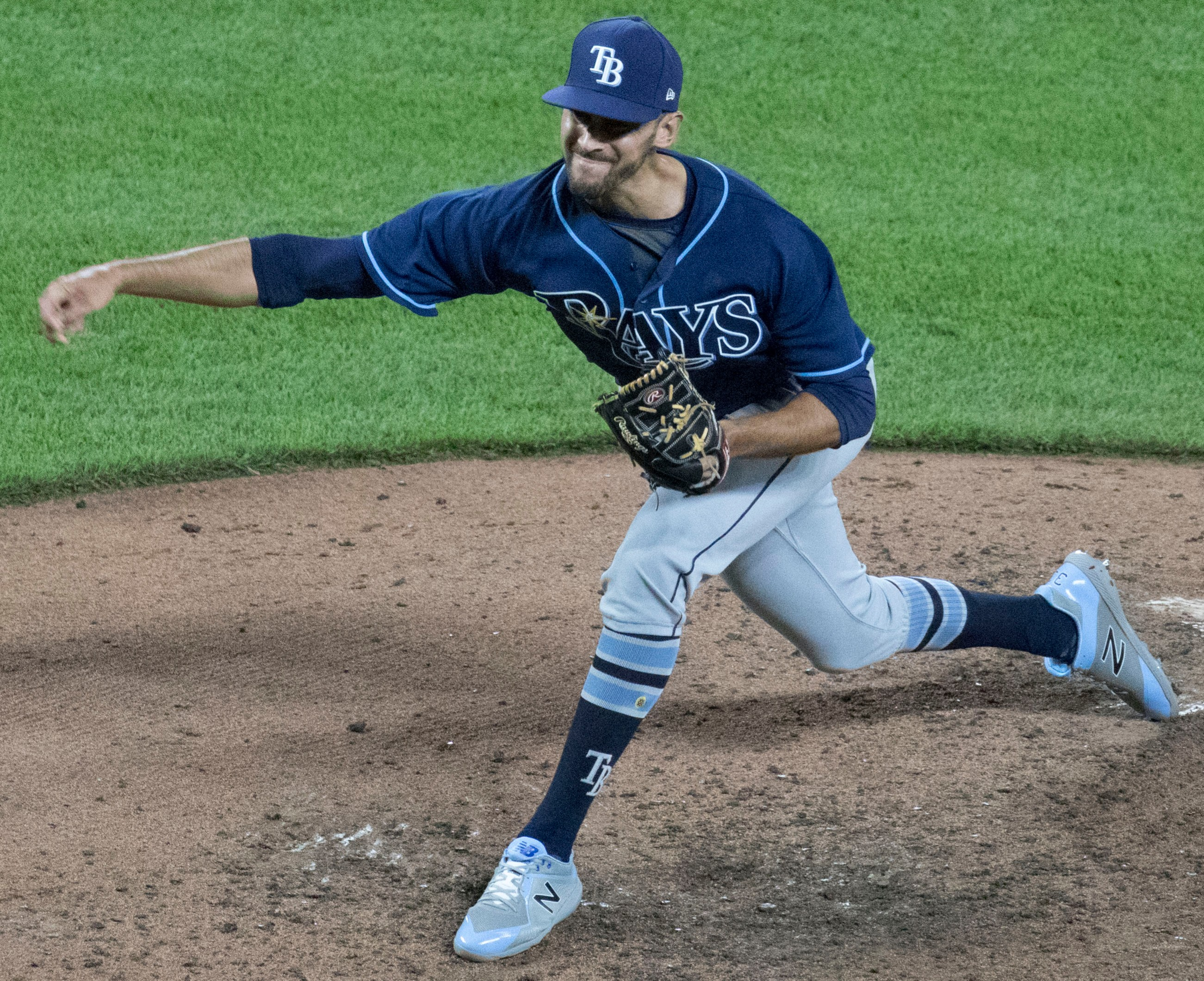
Cishek with the Tampa Bay Rays in 2017

On July 28, 2017, the Mariners traded Cishek to the Tampa Bay Rays for Erasmo Ramírez. He became a free agent following the season.

=== Chicago Cubs ===
On December 16, 2017, Cishek signed a two-year, $13 million contract with the Chicago Cubs. On August 20, 2019, he was reactivated from the Triple-A Iowa Cubs.

=== Chicago White Sox ===
On January 14, 2020, Cishek signed a one-year deal with the Chicago White Sox. With the 2020 Chicago White Sox, Cishek appeared in 22 games, compiling a 0–0 record with 5.40 ERA and 21 strikeouts in 20.0 innings pitched. Cishek was designated for the assignment by the White Sox on September 24. He was released by the organization on September 28.

=== Houston Astros ===
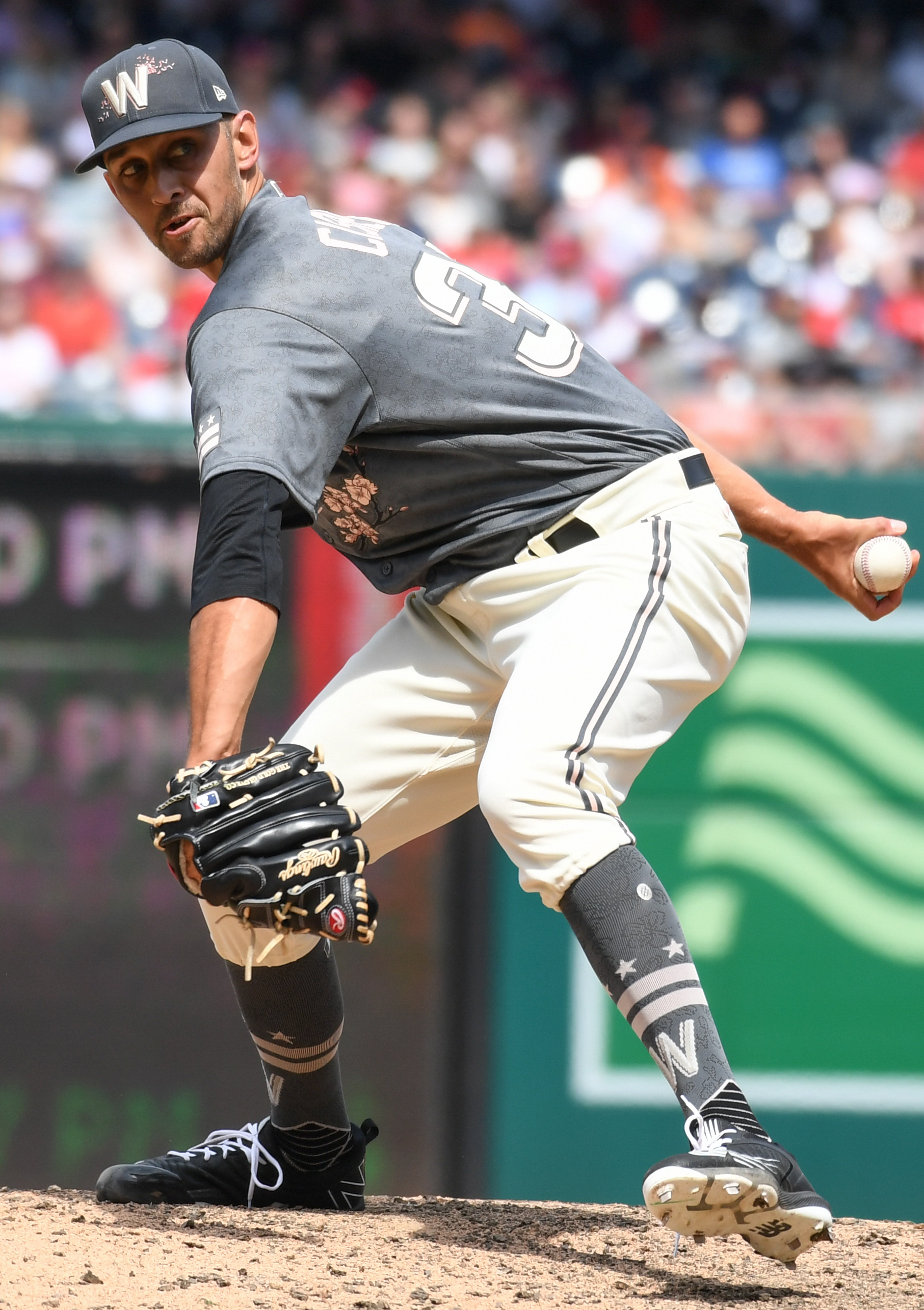
Cishek with the Nationals in 2022

On February 9, 2021, Cishek signed a minor league contract with the Houston Astros organization that included an invitation to Spring Training. On March 25, 2021, Cishek requested and was granted his release.

=== Los Angeles Angels ===
On March 29, 2021, Cishek signed a one-year, $1 million contract with the Los Angeles Angels. He appeared in 74 games with the Angels and compiled an 0–2 record with a 3.42 ERA and 64 strikeouts in 68.1 innings pitched.

=== Washington Nationals ===
On March 14, 2022, Cishek signed a one-year contract with the Washington Nationals. He made 69 appearances for the Nationals in 2022, recording a 4.21 ERA with 74 strikeouts in 66 1/3 innings pitched.

On December 30, 2022, Cishek announced his retirement from professional baseball.

== Player profile ==
Cishek is primarily a sinkerballer who, despite utilizing a sidearm delivery, is able to throw his sinker with above-average velocity ranging from 91 miles per hour (146 km/h) to 94 miles per hour (151 km/h). His secondary pitch is a slider in the 82–85 miles per hour (132–137 km/h) range, a pitch he uses more commonly against right-handed hitters. Additionally, he has a four-seam fastball and a changeup; he uses the changeup exclusively against left-handed hitters, and that pitch ranges from 83 miles per hour (134 km/h) to 86 miles per hour (138 km/h). Cishek features his slider liberally in two-strike counts, especially 1–2.

== Personal life ==
Cishek married Marissa (Mitchell) Cishek in November 2012. The couple have three daughters together. Cishek is a Christian. Growing up in Massachusetts, Cishek was a fan of the Boston Red Sox.
