= Clay Hensley =

American baseball player (born 1979)

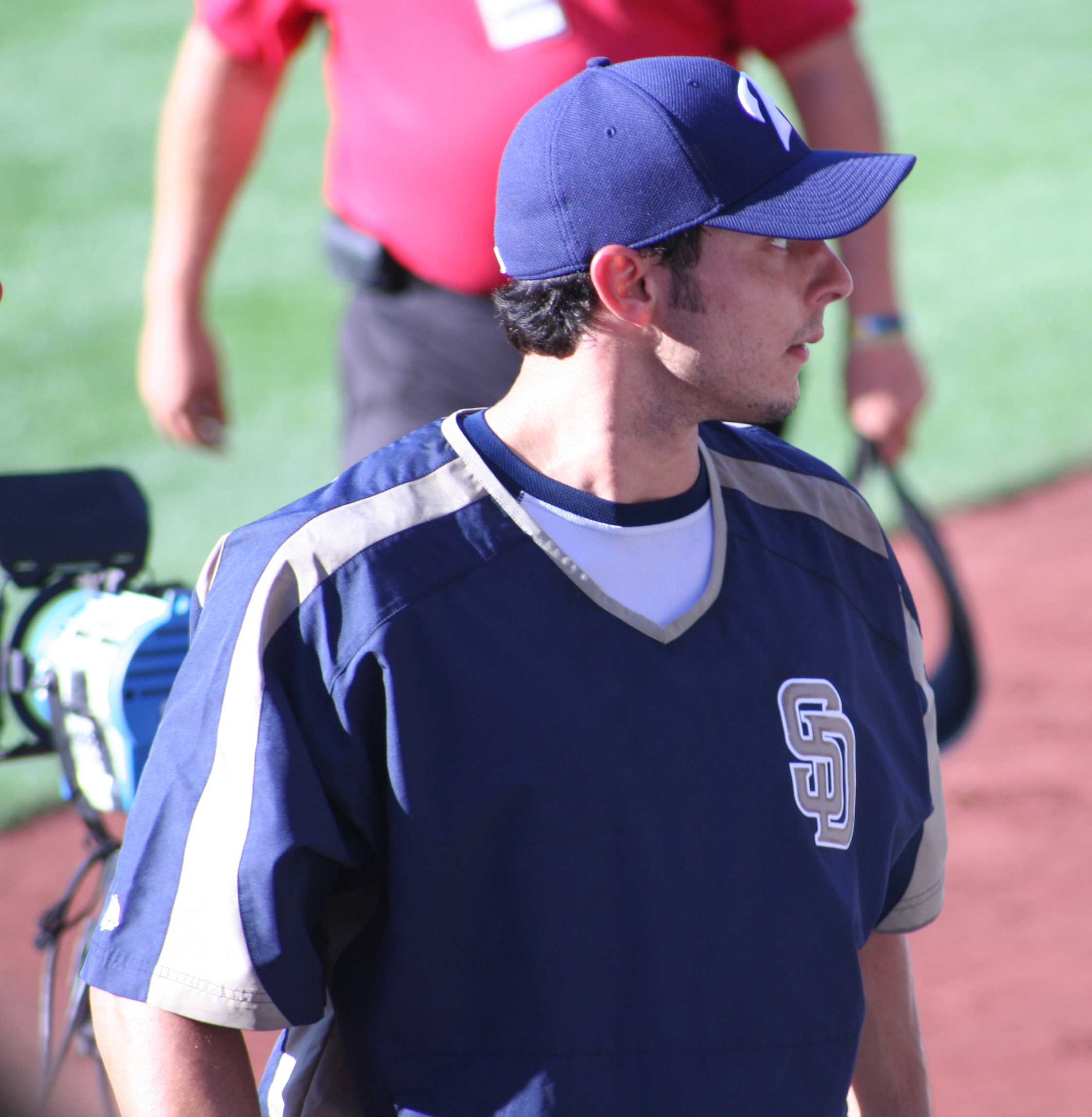
- Hensley with the San Diego Padres
- Pitcher
- Born: August 31, 1979 (age 46); Pearland, Texas, U.S.
- Batted: Right Threw: Right

MLB debut
- July 20, 2005, for the San Diego Padres

Last MLB appearance
- October 3, 2012, for the San Francisco Giants

MLB statistics
- Win–loss record: 28–34
- Earned run average: 4.00
- Strikeouts: 371
- Stats at Baseball Reference

Teams
- San Diego Padres (2005–2008); Florida Marlins (2010–2011); San Francisco Giants (2012)

Clayton Allen Hensley (born August 31, 1979) is an American former professional baseball pitcher. He played in Major League Baseball (MLB) for the San Diego Padres, Florida Marlins, and San Francisco Giants.

== Early life ==
Clayton Allen Hensley was born on August 31, 1979, in Pearland, Texas.

== College career ==
Hensley attended Lamar University in Beaumont, Texas, where he set a single season record with 127 strikeouts in 100 innings.

== Professional career ==
=== Draft and minor leagues ===
Hensley was drafted by the San Francisco Giants in the eighth round of the 2002 Major League Baseball draft. On May 3, 2003, he pitched a perfect game for the Hagerstown Suns of the South Atlantic League.

On July 13, 2003, Hensley was traded to the San Diego Padres in exchange for Matt Herges. On April 5, 2005, he was suspended 15 games for testing positive for steroids while pitching in the minor leagues.

=== San Diego Padres (2005–2008) ===
Later that season, he was called up from the Triple-A Portland Beavers. He emerged as a vital figure in middle relief, not allowing a home run in 47 2/3 innings pitched.

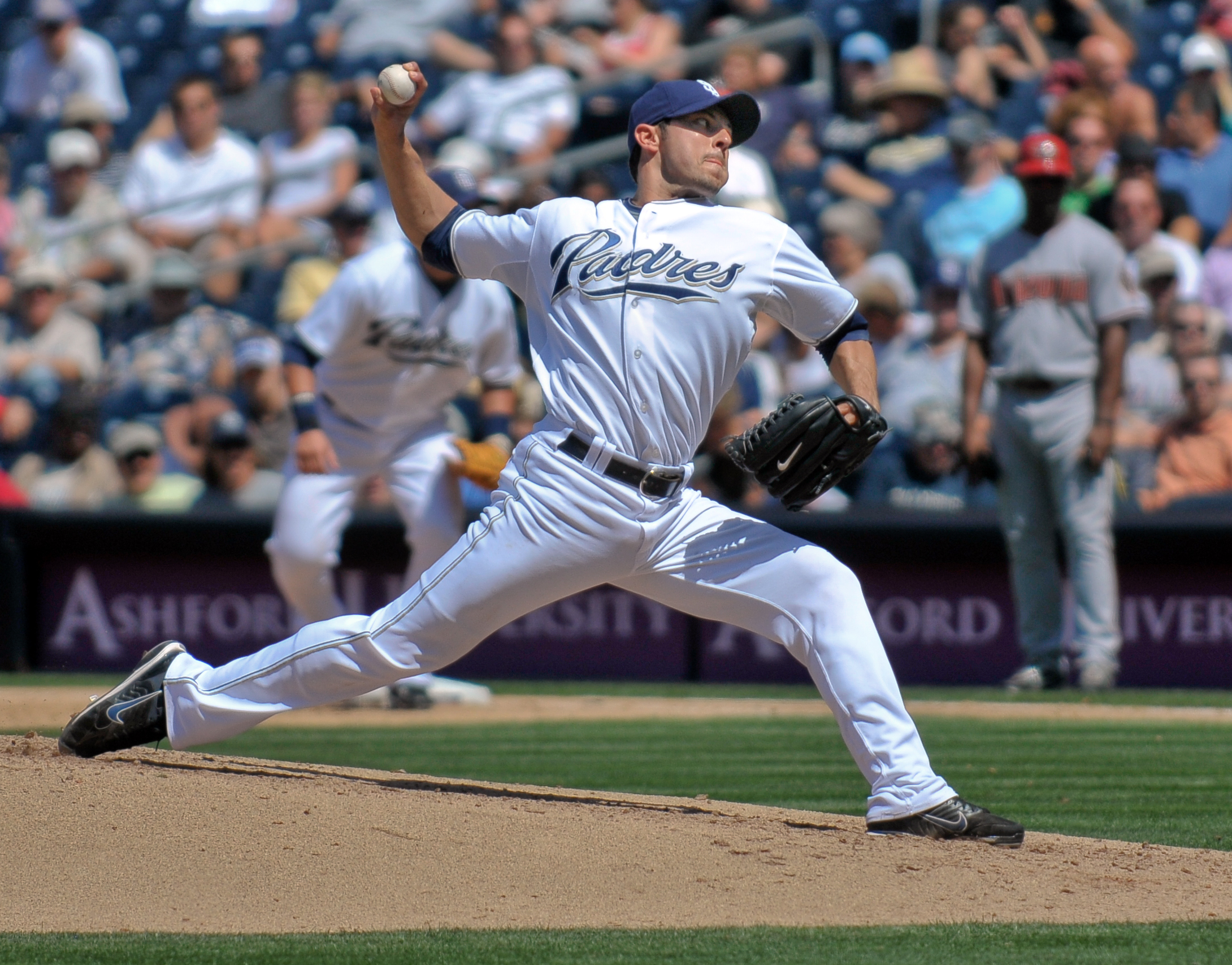
Hensley with the Padres in 2008

In 2006, Hensley made 29 starts for the San Diego Padres, with an Earned run average (ERA) of 3.71.

Hensley began the 2007 season as the Padres' #5 starter, but was placed on the disabled list in May. After struggling in his minor league rehab starts, Hensley was optioned to the Triple-A Portland Beavers.

On August 4, 2007, Hensley gave up Barry Bonds's 755th career home run, which tied Bonds with Hank Aaron for most all-time. The next day, Hensley was optioned to the minor leagues.

Hensley was non-tendered by the Padres following the 2008 season, making him a free agent.

=== Houston Astros ===
On December 23, 2008, Hensley signed a minor league contract with the Houston Astros that included an invitation to spring training worth $550,000. In 6 games for the Triple-A Round Rock Express, he struggled to a 7.20 ERA with 5 strikeouts in 10 innings. On May 13, 2009, Hensley was released by the Astros organization.

=== Florida Marlins (2010–2011) ===
On May 13, 2009, Hensley signed a minor league contract with the Florida Marlins.

In 2010, Hensley took over the closer role from Leo Núñez. For the start 2011 season, Hensley was once again being used as a setup man. However, after injury problems to both himself and Marlins ace Josh Johnson, the Marlins promoted him to the starting rotation. He was designated for assignment on December 9, 2011, and became a free agent after being non-tendered by Miami on December 13.

=== San Francisco Giants (2012) ===
On February 8, 2012, Hensley signed a non-guaranteed contract with the San Francisco Giants that included an invitation to spring training. He made the Giants' 2012 Opening Day roster out of spring training. He became a free agent following the season.

=== Cincinnati Reds ===
On February 11, 2013, he signed a minor league contract with the Cincinnati Reds. Hensley was released from the Reds Triple-A affiliate the Louisville Bats on May 20, thus becoming a free agent.

=== Milwaukee Brewers ===
On May 26, 2013, Hensley signed a minor league contract with the Milwaukee Brewers. In 4 games for the Triple-A Nashville Sounds, he posted a 3.38 ERA with 2 strikeouts over 2 2/3 innings pitched. Hensley was released by the Brewers organization on June 11.

=== Sugar Land Skeeters ===
On August 11, 2013, Hensley signed with the Sugar Land Skeeters of the Atlantic League of Professional Baseball. He made 14 appearances for the Skeeters, compiling a 2–0 record and 0.63 ERA with 16 strikeouts and one save across 14 1/3 innings pitched. Hensley became a free agent following the season.

On January 24, 2014, Hensley signed a minor league contract with the Washington Nationals that included an invitation to spring training. He was released prior to the start of the season on March 20.

On April 11, 2014, Hensley signed again with the Sugar Land Skeeters of the Atlantic League. In three games (one start) for the Skeeters, he struggled to a 13.50 ERA with one strikeout over 2 2/3 innings pitched. Hensley announced his retirement from professional baseball on April 28.

== Pitching style ==
Although Hensley lacked premium speed on his pitches, he used his upper-80s sinker to induce weak contact. To right-handed hitters, Hensley added a slider averaging about 80 mph and a big curveball averaging about 70 mph to the mix. To lefties, Hensley used the curveball and a changeup in the low 80s. He also occasionally threw a four-seam fastball. He delivered his pitches with a nearly straight-overhead throwing motion.

== Personal life ==
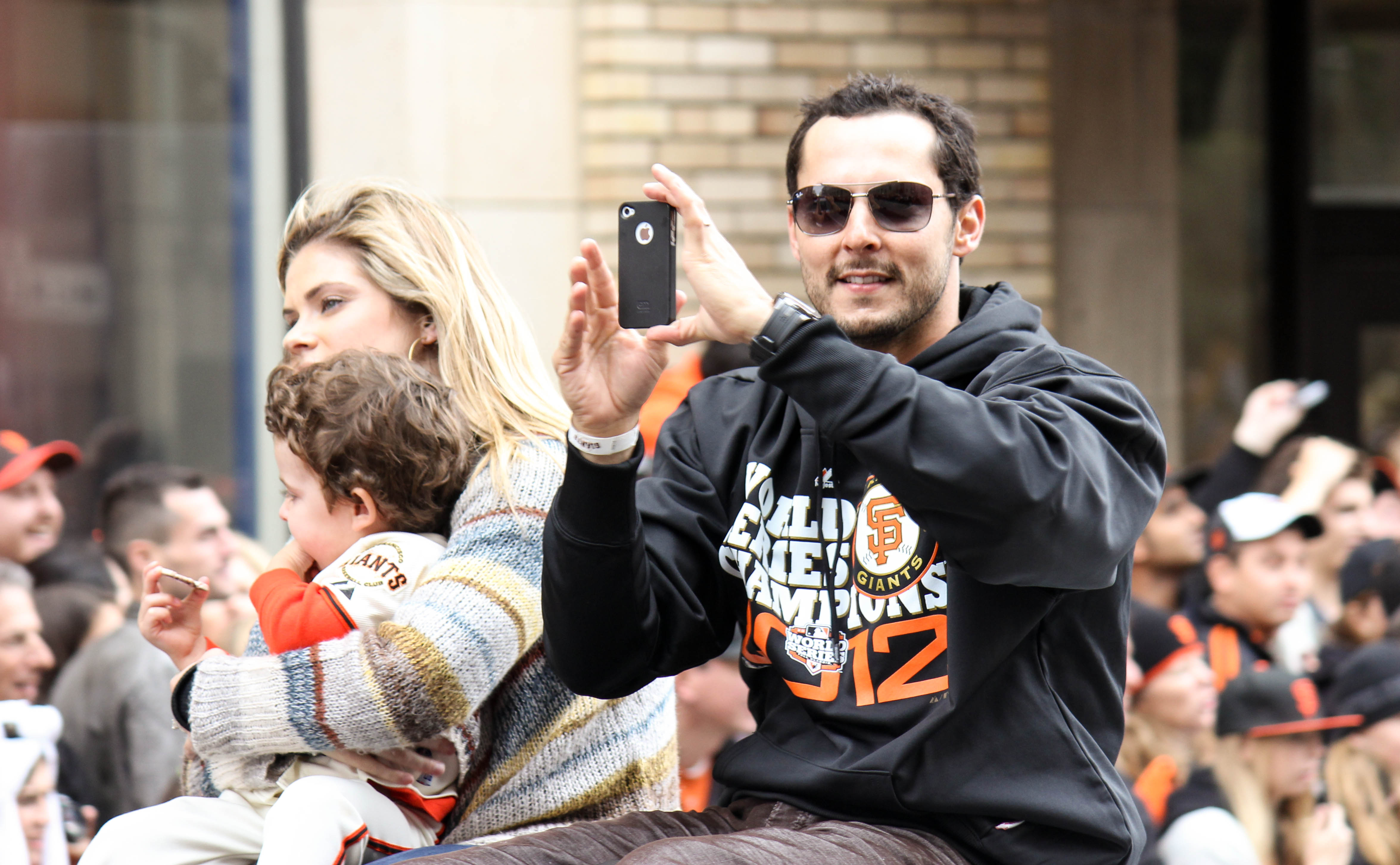
Hensley with his family at the 2012 World Series victory parade

As of June 2023, Hensley is married and lives in Pearland.
