= Jay Buente =

American baseball player (born 1983)

- Pitcher
- Born: September 28, 1983 (age 42); Evansville, Indiana, U.S.
- Batted: Right Threw: Right

MLB debut
- May 27, 2010, for the Florida Marlins

Last MLB appearance
- July 26, 2011, for the Tampa Bay Rays

MLB statistics
- Win–loss record: 0–1
- Earned run average: 7.31
- Strikeouts: 11
- Stats at Baseball Reference

Teams
- Florida Marlins (2010–2011); Tampa Bay Rays (2011)

Jay Phillip Buente (pronounced "BEN tee") (born September 28, 1983) is an American former professional baseball pitcher. He played in Major League Baseball (MLB) for the Florida Marlins and Tampa Bay Rays. He was drafted in the 14th round of the 2006 Major League Baseball draft.

== Amateur career ==
=== High school ===
Buente attended F. J. Reitz High School where he was a two-year letterwinner at and earned academic all-city honors as a junior and senior. He was also named first-team all-metro as a senior, posting a 1.82 ERA while striking out 87 batters in 68 innings. On the academic side of school, Buente was a member of the National Honor Society. He also participated in wrestling and cross country.

=== College ===
==== Freshman ====
Buente attended Purdue University where in his freshman campaign he appeared in 13 games, all in relief. He did not record a decision while posting a 4.22 ERA in 21 1/3 innings pitched. On February 28, he made his collegiate debut in the season-opener against the University of Pittsburgh, tossing three innings of no run ball while striking out three.

==== Sophomore ====
In his sophomore campaign, Buente appeared in 19 games, making three starts. He had a 1–2 record with a 7.12 ERA pitching 43 innings and striking out 36 batters. He was 0–1 in eight Big Ten appearances. He struck out a career-high nine batters in 4 2/3 innings against Western Michigan University on March 26. Buente pitched five innings of scoreless baseball in a start against Indiana State University on April 21 to earn his first collegiate victory.

He played for the Wisconsin Woodchucks of the Northwoods League in the summer of 2004, after his sophomore season. Buente was named to the mid-season all-star team for the league's South Division. He posted a 5–3 record with a 3.07 ERA in 15 appearances, 13 of which were starts. He also struck out 77 batters in 85 innings of work and limited opposing hitters to a .239 batting average.

==== Junior ====
Buente posted a 3–2 record in 14 appearances with three starts and pitched 38 1/3 innings, striking out 24 batters while allowing a .284 opponent batting average. He was 1–0 in Big Ten games, making five appearances on the mound and striking out eight in 12 1/3 innings. On March 16, Buente struck out a season-best seven batters against Lamar University.

In the summer of 2005 Buente was named a Summer League All-American by Baseball America, playing for the Wisconsin Woodchucks of the Northwoods League for the second straight summer. He was also a post-season all-star. Among accomplishments, Buente established franchise records for strikeouts in a season with 100, and career strikeouts with 177. He posted a 7–2 record in 13 starts with a 1.43 ERA, pitching 94 2/3 innings while limiting opponents to a .219 batting average. He also tossed three complete games, with one shutout and two combined shutouts.

==== Senior ====
In his senior year at Purdue, Buente pitched in 13 games all starts. Unlike seasons past when he was used as a reliever, he was used as a starter for the entire season. He went 6–4 with 70 strikeouts and a 3.40 ERA. He would set career highs in almost every category including strikeouts, earned run average, wins, games started, complete games and hits per nine innings.

== Professional career ==
=== Florida Marlins ===
Buente began his professional career with the Short-Season Jamestown Jammers of the New York–Penn League in 2006. He went 2–3 with a 3.09 ERA with one save in 43 2/3 innings over 22 appearances. He also made three starts and allowed only two home runs while striking out 41 batters and walking 13.

In 2007 Buente played for the Class-A Greensboro Grasshoppers of the South Atlantic League. He earned his first win on April 12 against the Lake County Captains. He threw a season-high four innings and struck out five in a win over West Virginia Power on May 12. He finished the season 5–2 with 71 strikeouts with one save and a 3.75 ERA in 42 games, all in relief.

He spent the 2008 seasons with the Class-A Advanced Jupiter Hammerheads. Buente picked up his first win of season by striking out five over 2 2/3 hitless innings on May 25 against the Lakeland Flying Tigers. He finished the season 5–1 with 63 strikeouts, one save and 3.00 ERA in 40 games, all in relief. He also held Florida State League hitters to a .220 batting average.

In 2009 Buente split the season between the Double-A Jacksonville Suns and the Triple-A New Orleans Zephyrs. With Jacksonville and went 0–1 with 23 strikeouts, one save and a 2.45 ERA in 16 games. During his time with New Orleans where he went 5–1 with 56 strikeouts, one save and a 3.39 ERA in 35 games. He would go a combined 5–2 with a career high 79 strikeouts, two saves and a 3.19 ERA in 83 innings pitched. After the season Buente joined the Arizona Fall League playing for the Mesa Solar Sox. He hopes his time in the AFL will help him join the Marlins' bullpen in 2010.

I'm definitely confident I can pitch in the big leagues...I know my organization will let me know when they think I'm ready they'll give me an opportunity, hopefully next year. I'm hoping to get an invite to Spring training.

— Jay Buente, mlb.com: November 9, 2009.

Buente was added to the 40-man roster on November 20, 2009, to protect him from the Rule 5 draft.

On May 21, 2011, he had his contract purchased by the Marlins after Josh Johnson was placed on the 15-day disabled list with shoulder inflammation. However, he was designated for assignment on May 24, after just one start.

=== Tampa Bay Rays ===
Buente was claimed off waivers by the Tampa Bay Rays on May 25, 2011. He was sent to the Durham Bulls, Triple-A affiliate of the Rays. Buente was then released following the conclusion of the 2012 season.

=== Lancaster Barnstormers ===
Buente spent the 2013 season as a pitcher with the Lancaster Barnstormers of the Atlantic League; he posted a record of 1–3 in 5 starts.
