= Juan Carlos Oviedo =

Dominican baseball player (born 1982)

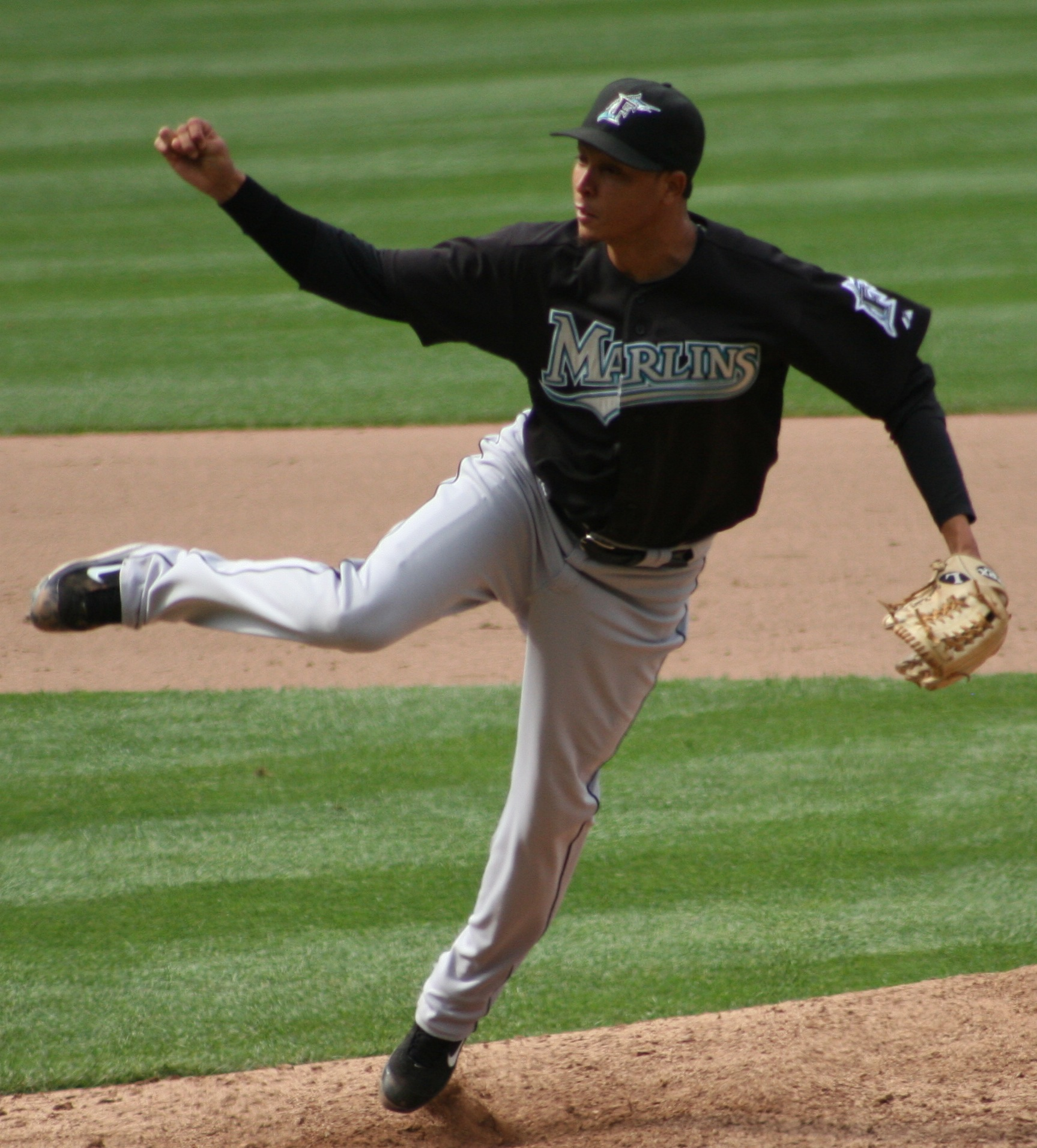
- Oviedo, then known as Leo Núñez, in 2009
- Pitcher
- Born: March 15, 1982 (age 44); Bonao, Dominican Republic
- Batted: Right Threw: Right

MLB debut
- May 9, 2005, for the Kansas City Royals

Last MLB appearance
- July 19, 2014, for the Tampa Bay Rays

MLB statistics
- Win–loss record: 21–23
- Earned run average: 4.28
- Strikeouts: 314
- Saves: 93
- Stats at Baseball Reference

Teams
- Kansas City Royals (2005–2008); Florida Marlins (2009–2011); Tampa Bay Rays (2014)

Juan Carlos Oviedo (born March 15, 1982 (Note: Exact birth date is unclear due to name controversy. Some sources like MLB.com list March 15, 1982, while others list August 14, 1983.)) is a Dominican former professional baseball pitcher. He bats and throws right-handed. At age 17, he began using the name Leo Núñez, although his true identity was revealed in 2011. He played in Major League Baseball (MLB) for the Kansas City Royals, Florida Marlins, and Tampa Bay Rays.

== Early life ==
Oviedo was born in Bonao in the Dominican Republic. At age 17, Oviedo assumed the identity of his 16-year-old best friend, Leo Nunez, in order to receive a more lucrative contract. In 2011, Marlins reliever Edward Mujica, a close friend of Oviedo's, said that "[a]t 17 years old, you maybe lose $100,000 or $150,000 when you sign [compared to a 16-year-old with the same skills]. And if you're like 18, you might sign for $5,000 and maybe they give you an opportunity."

== Professional career ==
=== Pittsburgh Pirates ===
Oviedo was originally signed by the Pittsburgh Pirates as an undrafted free agent on February 16, 2000. From 2001 to 2004, he was mainly used as a starting pitcher in the Pirates system.

=== Kansas City Royals ===
On December 16, 2004, Oviedo was traded to the Kansas City Royals in exchange for catcher Benito Santiago.

After being traded to the Royals, he was converted to a full-time relief pitcher. He began the 2005 season with the Single-A High Desert Mavericks. He was promoted to the Double-A Wichita Wranglers after posting a 9.00 ERA in eight games.

Oviedo had his contract purchased by the big league club on May 9, 2005, and he made his major league debut the same day.

Along with teammates Ambiorix Burgos and Andrew Sisco, they were the first trio of rookie pitchers in major league history to throw at least 50 innings each without making a start. Oviedo finished the 2005 season with a 3–2 record and a 7.55 ERA in 41 games.

In 2006, Oviedo played for the Double-A Wranglers, Triple-A Omaha Royals, and at the major league level. He only played in seven major league games in 2006, with a 4.73 ERA.

In 2007, Oviedo was converted back into a starting pitcher. On June 22, 2007, Oviedo would have been traded to the Oakland Athletics in exchange for outfielder Milton Bradley. However, according to the Royals report, Bradley was injured at the time, and the trade was voided. In 13 appearances (six starts) for Kansas City, he posted a 2–4 record and 3.92 ERA with 37 strikeouts across 43 2/3 innings pitched.

Oviedo made 45 appearances out of the bullpen for Kansas City during the 2008 campaign, compiling a 4–1 record and 2.98 ERA with 26 strikeouts across 48 1/3 innings pitched.

=== Florida / Miami Marlins ===
On October 31, 2008, Oviedo was traded by the Royals to the Florida Marlins in exchange for first baseman Mike Jacobs. In 2009, he became the Marlins' closer after Matt Lindstrom was placed on the disabled list in late June. In 75 appearances for the Marlins, Oviedo logged a 4–6 record and 4.06 ERA with 60 strikeouts and 26 saves across 68 2/3 innings pitched.

Oviedo pitched in 68 contests for Florida during the 2010 season, logging a 4–3 record and 3.46 ERA with 71 strikeouts and 30 saves over 65 innings of work. He made another 68 appearances for the Marlins in 2011, registering a 1–4 record and 4.06 ERA with 55 strikeouts and a career-high 36 saves across 64 1/3 innings pitched.

On April 1, 2012, MLB announced that they would suspend Oviedo for 6 weeks after he was removed from the restricted list; Oviedo had to acquire a visa to be removed. On May 28, Oviedo was suspended for eight extra weeks for age and identity fraud. He would be eligible for one rehabilitation assignment in the minor leagues for a maximum of 16 days. Oviedo was eligible to play for the Marlins starting on July 23. During a rehabilitation appearance for the Triple-A New Orleans Zephyrs on July 16, Oviedo sprained his right elbow's ulnar collateral ligament and was later placed on disabled list. On September 6, Oviedo underwent Tommy John surgery. He became a free agent following the season.

=== Tampa Bay Rays ===
On January 22, 2013, Oviedo signed a minor league contract the Tampa Bay Rays. He had his contract selected by the team on March 31. Oviedo began the season on the 60-day disabled list still recovering from the Tommy John surgery he previously had. After missing all of the 2013 season, Oviedo had his $2 million club option for 2014 declined, and was instead paid a $30,000 buyout, making him a free agent.

On December 5, 2013, Oviedo re-signed with Tampa Bay on a major league contract. In 32 appearances for the Rays, he compiled a 3–3 record and 3.69 ERA with 26 strikeouts across 31 2/3 innings pitched. Oviedo was designated for assignment by Tampa Bay on July 26, 2014. He released by the organization on August 3.

=== Texas Rangers ===
On January 5, 2015, Oviedo signed a minor league contract with the Texas Rangers. He was released by the Rangers prior to the start of the season on March 28.

== Name controversy ==
On September 22, 2011, the Florida Marlins placed Oviedo on the restricted list without listing a reason. The Associated Press reported that his real name was Juan Carlos Oviedo, that he was a year older than listed, and that he returned to the Dominican Republic to deal with the issue. Dominican Central Electoral Commission President Roberto Rosario said that Oviedo signed a sworn statement saying he used fake identification documents.
