= Brett Hayes =

American baseball player (born 1984)

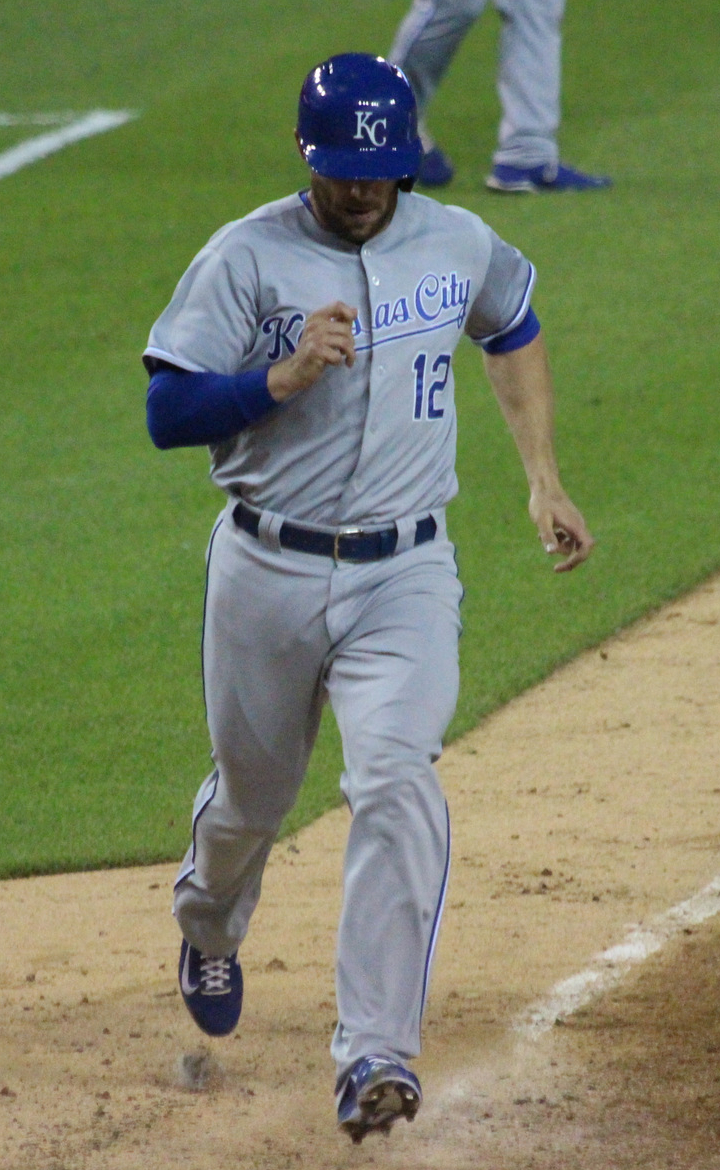
- Hayes with the Kansas City Royals

Texas Rangers – No. 87
- Catcher / Coach
- Born: February 13, 1984 (age 42); Pasadena, California, U.S.
- Batted: Right Threw: Right

MLB debut
- May 22, 2009, for the Florida Marlins

Last MLB appearance
- May 23, 2015, for the Cleveland Indians

MLB statistics
- Batting average: .205
- Home runs: 13
- Runs batted in: 37
- Stats at Baseball Reference

Teams
- As player: Florida / Miami Marlins (2009–2012); Kansas City Royals (2013–2014); Cleveland Indians (2015); As coach: Texas Rangers (2020–present)

Career highlights and awards
- World Series champion (2023)
Medals
Men's baseball
Representing United States
World University Championship
Gold medal – first place	2004 Tainan	Team

Brett Gregory Hayes (born February 13, 1984) is an American former professional baseball catcher and current catching coach for the Texas Rangers of Major League Baseball (MLB). He played in MLB for the Florida / Miami Marlins, Kansas City Royals, and Cleveland Indians.

== Personal life ==
Brett Hayes is the son of Tim Hayes Jr., and the grandson of Tim Hayes Sr., both professional baseball players. Tim Hayes Jr. was drafted by the Kansas City Royals, but never appeared professionally. Tim Hayes Sr. played professionally for the Cleveland Indians. In the fall of 2011, Brett married longtime girlfriend Elizabeth, in Minnesota.

Hayes attended Notre Dame High School in Sherman Oaks and was a two-year varsity starter.

== College ==
Hayes attended college at the University of Nevada, Reno. While playing for the Nevada Wolf Pack, he was named the Western Athletic Conference Freshman of the Year, and a Freshman All-American. He made the all-Western Athletic Conference team for three straight seasons. In 2004, he played collegiate summer baseball with the Cotuit Kettleers of the Cape Cod Baseball League.

== Professional career ==
=== Florida Marlins ===
==== Minor leagues ====
From 2005 to 2006, Hayes appeared for the rookie-level Gulf Coast League Marlins, Low-A Jamestown Jammers, and Single-A Greensboro Grasshoppers. Hayes played 51 games in 2007, splitting time between the Jupiter Hammerheads and Carolina Mudcats. From 2008 to 2011, Hayes played for Jupiter, Carolina, the Triple-A New Orleans Zephyrs, and the Triple-A Albuquerque Isotopes.

==== Major leagues ====
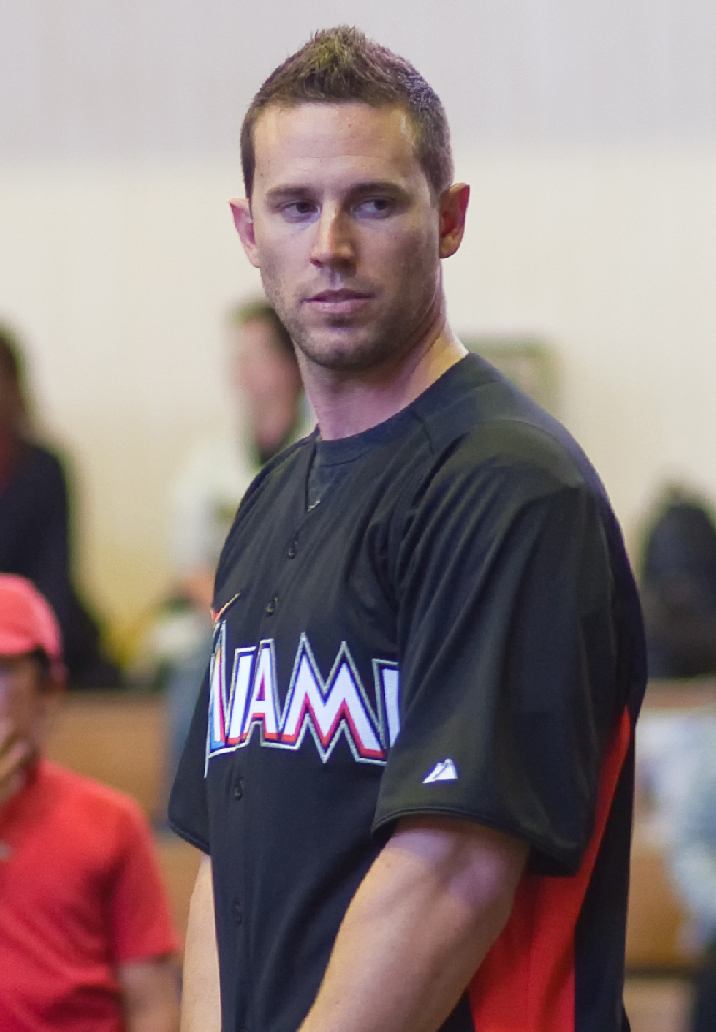
Hayes during his tenure with the Miami Marlins in 2011

Hayes was called up to the Florida Marlins on May 22, 2009, hitting a single in his first at bat that night. He hit his first major league home run off of the Washington Nationals' Víctor Gárate on September 5.

After splitting the 2010 season in the major and minor leagues, Hayes played in 64 games for the Marlins in 2011, batting .231 with five home runs and 16 runs batted in.

To open the 2012 campaign, Hayes was named as the team's backup catcher behind John Buck. After playing in 39 games for the Marlins, he was sent down to Triple-A New Orleans on August 12, 2012. In those 39 games, Hayes batted .202 with three runs batted in, no home runs, and six runs scored.

=== Kansas City Royals ===
The Kansas City Royals claimed Hayes off waivers on November 2, 2012. He signed a one-year, $600,000 contract with the Royals on November 20, 2012. His contract was selected from the Omaha Storm Chasers on August 4, 2013, when Salvador Pérez was placed on the 7-day disabled list. Hayes was designated for assignment on August 11, 2013, when Pérez returned. He cleared waivers and was sent outright to Omaha on August 15. Hayes' contract was selected again when the major league rosters expanded on September 1.

Hayes played in 27 games for Kansas City during the 2014 season, slashing .135/.151/.212 with one home run and two RBI. Hayes was designated for assignment by the Royals on July 28, 2014. He cleared waivers and was sent outright to Triple-A Omaha on August 4.

=== Cleveland Indians ===
On December 15, 2014, Hayes signed a minor league contract with the Cleveland Indians. The Indians purchased his contract on April 14, 2015, and added him to the active roster. Hayes was designated for assignment on May 24.

=== Arizona Diamondbacks ===
On October 26, 2015, Hayes signed a minor league contract with the Arizona Diamondbacks organization. He played in 18 games for the Triple–A Reno Aces, batting .161/.175/.196 with no home runs and four RBI.

=== Chicago White Sox ===
On June 6, 2016, Hayes was traded to the Chicago White Sox in exchange for cash considerations. He finished the year with the Triple–A Charlotte Knights, slashing .225/.354/.425 with one home run and two RBI across 13 appearances. Hayes elected free agency following the season on November 7.

=== Texas Rangers ===
On February 10, 2017, Hayes signed a minor league contract with the Texas Rangers organization. In 66 games for the Triple–A Round Rock Express, he batted .211/.274/.315 with four home runs and 21 RBI. Hayes elected free agency following the season on November 6.

== Front office and coaching roles ==
After retiring from playing following the 2017 season, Hayes joined the Texas Rangers Front Office, serving as an advance scout in 2018. Hayes was promoted to Coordinator of Run Prevention for the 2019 season, joining the Rangers coaching staff. His role included traveling with the team and preparing advanced scouting reports in conjunction with the Rangers pitching coaches.

Hayes spent the 2022 through 2024 seasons as the bullpen coach of the Rangers. Hayes won his first World Series ring with the Rangers in 2023. Hayes was moved to quality control coach for the 2025 season. Hayes was transitioned to the Rangers' catching coach prior to the 2026 season.
