= Charging the mound =

Baseball term

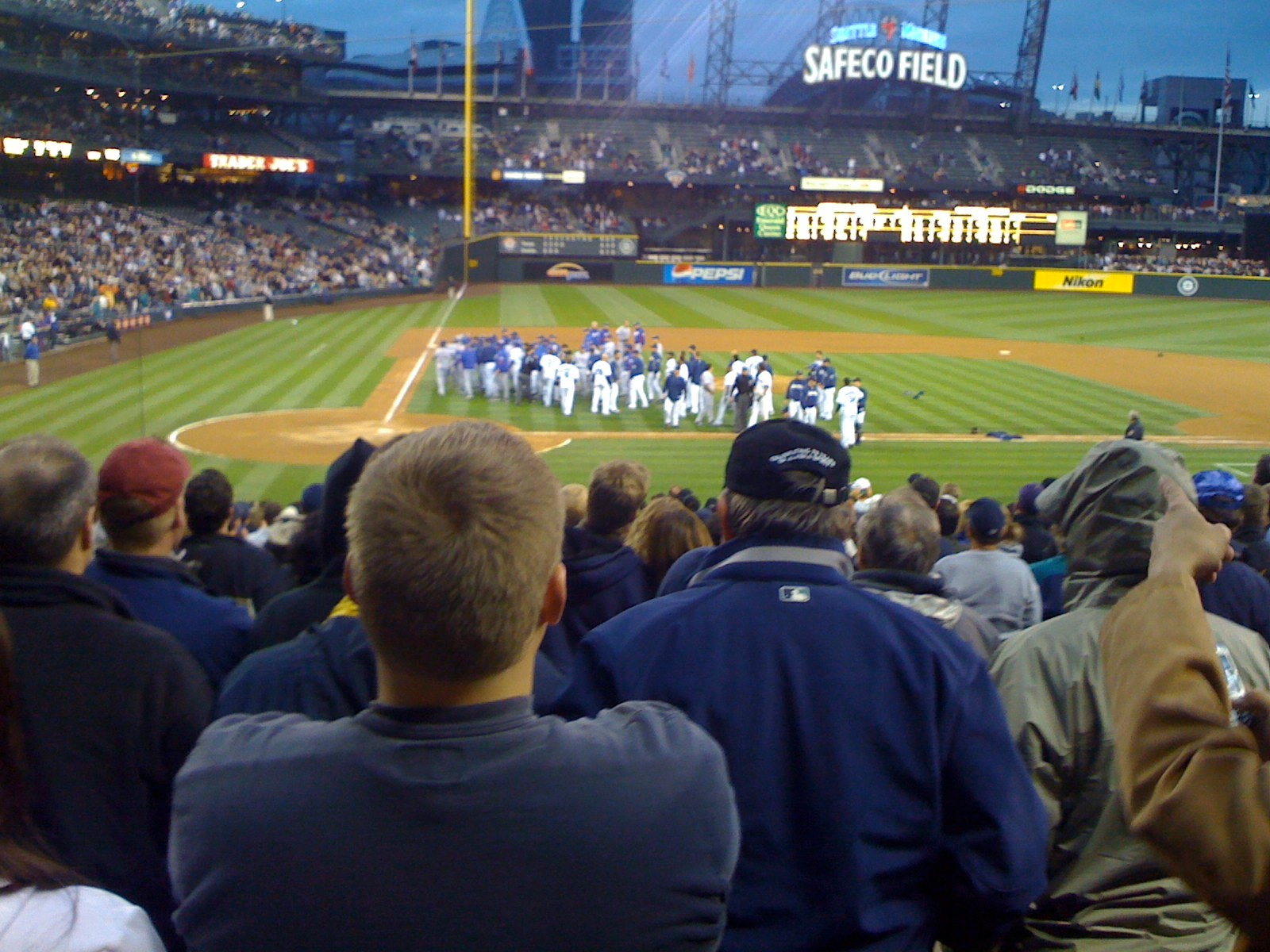
This incident between the Texas Rangers and Seattle Mariners on May 8, 2008, followed Seattle batter Richie Sexson charging the mound in the 4th inning.

In baseball, charging the mound is an assault by a batter against the pitcher, usually the result of being hit by a pitch or nearly being hit by a pitch, such as a brushback. Charging the mound is the most common initiator of a bench-clearing brawl. The first incidence of a professional player charging of the mound has not been identified, but the practice dates back to the game's early days.

== Description ==
Charging the mound is typically about the batter responding to an indignity rather than a serious attempt to injure the pitcher. There is long-standing etiquette in baseball regarding what is an acceptable offense to warrant a beaning, and there are similar unwritten rules for charging in response to being hit.

Before charging, the batter usually throws his bat and helmet aside so that he may face the pitcher unarmed—it is a very serious breach of baseball etiquette, and also dangerous, for the batter to charge the mound with a bat, and doing so has resulted in criminal charges. Though serious injuries have occurred from charging in the past, usually fights are either broken up or joined by all other players so the conflict turns into posturing and name-calling; in baseball parlance, this is known as a rhubarb.

In Japan, it is customary for pitchers to tip their cap to a batter hit by a pitch if it was not their intent to hit the batter, to avoid a mound-charging incident.

=== Major League Baseball ===
While the above noted unwritten rules have become more vague, the response of Major League Baseball (MLB) to mound-charging incidents has become far more strict. Whereas suspensions in the past were rare and usually short, Commissioner Fay Vincent and his successor Bud Selig reacted harshly to instances of both beaning and charging during their respective tenures. Most incidents which have caused the benches to clear under Rob Manfred's commissionership have been met with large fines and lengthy suspensions.

According to sportswriter Jon Bois, Bruce Kison and Pedro Martínez are the only two major-league pitchers to have batters charge the mound at them four times during their careers.
