= 2011 Washington Nationals season =

2011 Washington Nationals
- League: National League
- Division: East
- Ballpark: Nationals Park
- City: Washington, D.C.
- Record: 80–81 (.497)
- Divisional place: 3rd
- Owners: Lerner Enterprises
- General managers: Mike Rizzo
- Managers: Jim Riggleman, John McLaren, Davey Johnson
- Television: MASN; WDCW (CW 50) (Bob Carpenter, FP Santangelo, Ray Knight, Johnny Holliday, Dave Jageler)
- Radio: WJFK 106.7 FM (Charlie Slowes, Dave Jageler)

The Washington Nationals' 2011 season was the seventh season for the American baseball franchise of Major League Baseball in the District of Columbia and the 43rd since the original team was started in Montreal, Quebec, Canada. It involved the Nationals attempting to win the National League East after a 69–93 season the year before.

On June 23, 2011, manager Jim Riggleman resigned after contract disputes with general manager Mike Rizzo. Riggleman resigned following a 1–0 win over the Seattle Mariners which put the Nationals over .500 at the latest point in a season since 2005 and gave them their 11th win in 12 games. Riggleman compiled a 140–172 record with the Nationals after he replaced Manny Acta after the all-star break in 2009. On June 24, Davey Johnson was named the new manager. Previously, he was a senior advisor to Mike Rizzo. He began managing on June 27. Bench coach John McLaren managed the club for three games following Riggleman's resignation before Johnson was decided upon as interim manager.

The Nationals finished the 2011 season in third place in the NL East with an 80–81 record, playing only 161 games because one game against the Los Angeles Dodgers was canceled due to rain. Their third-place finish was their best finish in the standings and second-best win–loss record since they moved to Washington.

This was the last season that the Nationals finished with a losing record until 2020.

== Offseason ==
The Nationals formed a new minor league affiliation with the Auburn Doubledays of the New York–Penn League during the winter. The player development contract was officially announced December 14, 2010.

On December 16, 2010, the Nationals traded Josh Willingham to the Oakland Athletics for Corey Brown and Henry Rodríguez. On January 19, 2011, they traded minor-leaguers Michael Burgess, Graham Hicks, and A. J. Morris to the Chicago Cubs for Tom Gorzelanny. On February 2, 2011, they traded Justin Maxwell to the New York Yankees for minor-leaguer for Adam Olbrychowski. On March 27, 2011, they traded Nyjer Morgan to the Milwaukee Brewers for minor-leaguer Cutter Dykstra and cash, and the following day they traded Alberto González to the San Diego Padres for Erik Davis.

== Advertising and marketing ==
The Nationals′ marketing slogan for 2011 was "Expect It." According to a letter to season ticket holders signed by Nationals Chief Operating Officer Andrew Feffer explained that the slogan let Nationals fans know that the team's rebuilding strategy "is beginning to show returns," and that "we are determined to continue to do what it takes to elevate the franchise to the next level." The letter added that "in 2010, we had a productive stable of veterans and stars in the lineup," that "we now have a solid and exciting pipeline of pitchers," and that the franchise's "improved Minor League system is now regularly producing a steady stream of Major League talent."

== New radio flagship ==
Starting with this season, the Nationals changed their flagship station to WJFK-FM (106.7 The Fan), after broadcasting their first six seasons on WTOP 103.5 FM.

== Spring training ==
The Nationals held their 2011 spring training in Viera, Florida, with home games played at Space Coast Stadium.

== Regular season ==
=== Season standings ===
==== National League East ====
NL East
| Team | W | L | Pct. | GB | Home | Road |
|---|---|---|---|---|---|---|
| Philadelphia Phillies | 102 | 60 | .630 | — | 52‍–‍29 | 50‍–‍31 |
| Atlanta Braves | 89 | 73 | .549 | 13 | 47‍–‍34 | 42‍–‍39 |
| Washington Nationals | 80 | 81 | .497 | 21½ | 44‍–‍36 | 36‍–‍45 |
| New York Mets | 77 | 85 | .475 | 25 | 34‍–‍47 | 43‍–‍38 |
| Florida Marlins | 72 | 90 | .444 | 30 | 31‍–‍47 | 41‍–‍43 |

==== National League Wild Card ====
Division leaders
| Team | W | L | Pct. |
|---|---|---|---|
| Philadelphia Phillies | 102 | 60 | .630 |
| Milwaukee Brewers | 96 | 66 | .593 |
| Arizona Diamondbacks | 94 | 68 | .580 |

Wild Card team (Top team qualifies for postseason)
| Team | W | L | Pct. | GB |
|---|---|---|---|---|
| St. Louis Cardinals | 90 | 72 | .556 | — |
| Atlanta Braves | 89 | 73 | .549 | 1 |
| San Francisco Giants | 86 | 76 | .531 | 4 |
| Los Angeles Dodgers | 82 | 79 | .509 | 7½ |
| Washington Nationals | 80 | 81 | .497 | 9½ |
| Cincinnati Reds | 79 | 83 | .488 | 11 |
| New York Mets | 77 | 85 | .475 | 13 |
| Colorado Rockies | 73 | 89 | .451 | 17 |
| Florida Marlins | 72 | 90 | .444 | 18 |
| Pittsburgh Pirates | 72 | 90 | .444 | 18 |
| Chicago Cubs | 71 | 91 | .438 | 19 |
| San Diego Padres | 71 | 91 | .438 | 19 |
| Houston Astros | 56 | 106 | .346 | 34 |

=== Record vs. opponents ===
2011 National League record Source: MLB Standings Grid – 2011
| Team | AZ | ATL | CHC | CIN | COL | FLA | HOU | LAD | MIL | NYM | PHI | PIT | SD | SF | STL | WSH | AL |
|---|---|---|---|---|---|---|---|---|---|---|---|---|---|---|---|---|---|
| Arizona | – | 2–3 | 3–4 | 4–2 | 13–5 | 5–2 | 6–1 | 10–8 | 4–3 | 3–3 | 3–3 | 3–3 | 11–7 | 9–9 | 3–4 | 5–3 | 10–8 |
| Atlanta | 3–2 | – | 4–3 | 3–3 | 6–2 | 12–6 | 5–1 | 2–5 | 5–3 | 9–9 | 6–12 | 4–2 | 4–5 | 6–1 | 1–5 | 9–9 | 10–5 |
| Chicago | 4–3 | 3–4 | – | 7–11 | 2–4 | 3–3 | 8–7 | 3–3 | 6–10 | 4–2 | 2–5 | 8–8 | 3–3 | 5–4 | 5–10 | 3–4 | 5–10 |
| Cincinnati | 2–4 | 3–3 | 11–7 | – | 3–4 | 3–3 | 9–6 | 4–2 | 8–8 | 2–5 | 1–7 | 5–10 | 4–2 | 5–2 | 9–6 | 4–2 | 6–12 |
| Colorado | 5–13 | 2–6 | 4–2 | 4–3 | – | 3–3 | 5–2 | 9–9 | 3–6 | 5–2 | 1–4 | 4–3 | 9–9 | 5–13 | 2–4 | 4–3 | 8–7 |
| Florida | 2–5 | 6–12 | 3–3 | 3–3 | 3–3 | – | 6–1 | 3–3 | 0–7 | 9–9 | 6–12 | 6–0 | 0–7 | 4–2 | 2–6 | 11–7 | 8–10 |
| Houston | 1–6 | 1–5 | 7–8 | 6–9 | 2–5 | 1–6 | – | 4–5 | 3–12 | 3–3 | 2–4 | 7–11 | 3–5 | 4–3 | 5–10 | 3–3 | 4–11 |
| Los Angeles | 8–10 | 5–2 | 3–3 | 2–4 | 9–9 | 3–3 | 5–4 | – | 2–4 | 2–5 | 1–5 | 6–2 | 13–5 | 9–9 | 4–3 | 4–2 | 6–9 |
| Milwaukee | 3–4 | 3–5 | 10–6 | 8–8 | 6–3 | 7–0 | 12–3 | 4–2 | – | 4–2 | 3–4 | 12–3 | 3–2 | 3–3 | 9–9 | 3–3 | 6–9 |
| New York | 3–3 | 9–9 | 2–4 | 5–2 | 2–5 | 9–9 | 3–3 | 5–2 | 2–4 | – | 7–11 | 4–4 | 4–3 | 2–4 | 3–3 | 8–10 | 9–9 |
| Philadelphia | 3–3 | 12–6 | 5–2 | 7–1 | 4–1 | 12–6 | 4–2 | 5–1 | 4–3 | 11–7 | – | 4–2 | 7–1 | 4–3 | 3–6 | 8–10 | 9–6 |
| Pittsburgh | 3–3 | 2–4 | 8–8 | 10–5 | 3–4 | 0–6 | 11–7 | 2–6 | 3–12 | 4–4 | 2–4 | – | 2–4 | 3–3 | 7–9 | 4–4 | 8–7 |
| San Diego | 7–11 | 5–4 | 3–3 | 2–4 | 9–9 | 7–0 | 5–3 | 5–13 | 2–3 | 3–4 | 1–7 | 4–2 | – | 6–12 | 3–3 | 3–4 | 6–9 |
| San Francisco | 9–9 | 1–6 | 4–5 | 2–5 | 13–5 | 2–4 | 3–4 | 9–9 | 3–3 | 4–2 | 3–4 | 3–3 | 12–6 | – | 5–2 | 3–4 | 10–5 |
| St. Louis | 4–3 | 5–1 | 10–5 | 6–9 | 4–2 | 6–2 | 10–5 | 3–4 | 9–9 | 3–3 | 6–3 | 9–7 | 3–3 | 2–5 | – | 2–4 | 8–7 |
| Washington | 3–5 | 9–9 | 4–3 | 2–4 | 3–4 | 7–11 | 3–3 | 2–4 | 3–3 | 10–8 | 10–8 | 4–4 | 4–3 | 4–3 | 4–2 | – | 8–7 |

=== Opening Day lineup ===
Opening Day Starters
| Name | Position |
|---|---|
| Ian Desmond | Shortstop |
| Jayson Werth | Right fielder |
| Ryan Zimmerman | Third baseman |
| Adam LaRoche | First baseman |
| Michael Morse | Left fielder |
| Rick Ankiel | Center fielder |
| Danny Espinosa | Second baseman |
| Iván Rodríguez | Catcher |
| Liván Hernández | Starting pitcher |

=== Notable transactions ===
- December 5, 2010: The Nationals sign free-agent outfielder Jayson Werth to a 7-year, $126M contract.
- May 8, 2011: The Nationals received Gregor Blanco from the Kansas City Royals as part of a conditional deal.
- June 27, 2011: The Nationals sold Miguel Pérez to the Pittsburgh Pirates.
- July 26, 2011: The Nationals traded minor-leaguers Chris Manno and Bill Rhinehart to the Cincinnati Reds for Jonny Gomes and cash.
- July 30, 2011: The Nationals traded Jason Marquis to the Arizona Diamondbacks for minor-leaguer Zach Walters and Jerry Hairston Jr., to the Milwaukee Brewers for minor-leaguer Erik Komatsu.
- August 9, 2011: The Nationals purchased Miguel Pérez from the Pittsburgh Pirates.

=== Draft ===
The 2011 Major League Baseball draft took place from June 6 to June 8. With their first pick – the sixth pick overall – the Nationals selected third baseman Anthony Rendon. Other notable players the Nationals selected were pitcher Alex Meyer (first round compensation pick, 23rd pick overall), pitcher Taylor Hill (sixth round, 187th overall), and outfielder Billy Burns (32nd round, 967th overall).

=== Roster ===
2011 Washington Nationals
**Roster**
| **Pitchers**: 23 Collin Balester; 55 Brian Broderick; 17 Sean Burnett; 36 Tyler Clippard; 60 Todd Coffey; 48 Ross Detwiler; 57 Chad Gaudin; 32 Tom Gorzelanny; 61 Liván Hernández; 65 Cole Kimball; 31 John Lannan; 21 Jason Marquis; 52 Ryan Mattheus; 29 Yunesky Maya; 46 Tom Milone; 41 Brad Peacock; 63 Henry Rodríguez; 59 Atahualpa Severino; 45 Doug Slaten; 35 Craig Stammen; 22 Drew Storen; 37 Stephen Strasburg; 40 Chien-Ming Wang; 27 Jordan Zimmermann | **Catchers**: 26 Jesús Flores; 3 Wilson Ramos; 7 Iván Rodríguez; **Infielders**: 13 Alex Cora; 6 Ian Desmond; 18 Danny Espinosa; 15 Jerry Hairston Jr.; 25 Adam LaRoche; 1 Steve Lombardozzi Jr.; 14 Chris Marrero; 38 Michael Morse; 11 Ryan Zimmerman; **Outfielders**: 43,24 Rick Ankiel; 2 Roger Bernadina; 10,43 Brian Bixler; 30 Jonny Gomes; 19,20 Laynce Nix; 12,24 Matt Stairs; 28 Jayson Werth; **Other batters**: 10 Corey Brown | **Manager**: 5 Davey Johnson (Hired on June 26, 2011); 8 John McLaren (Interim from June 23, 2011-June 25, 2011); 5 Jim Riggleman (Resigned on June 23, 2011); **Coaches**: 39 Pat Corrales (bench) (Interim Bench Coach from June 23, 2011-June 25, 2011); 4 Rick Eckstein (hitting); 9 Jim Lett (bullpen); 54 Steve McCatty (pitching); 8 John McLaren (bench); 16 Bo Porter (third base); 53 Dan Radison (first base) |

=== Attendance ===
The Nationals drew 1,940,478 fans at Nationals Park in 2011, improving over the previous season for the second straight year. It placed them 14th in attendance for the season among the 16 National League teams, also for the second consecutive year. Their highest attendance at a home game was on August 20, when they drew 44,685 for a game against the Philadelphia Phillies, while their lowest was 13,413 for a game against the Phillies on April 12. Their average home attendance was 24,256 per game, fifth-highest of their seven seasons in Washington but an increase from their previous season.

=== Game log ===
Legend
| | Nationals win |
| | Nationals loss |
| | Postponement |
| **Bold** | Nationals team member |

2011 game log
March (0–1)

| # | Date | Opponent | Score | Win | Loss | Save | Attendance | Record |
|---|---|---|---|---|---|---|---|---|
| 1 | March 31 | Braves | 2–0 | Lowe (1–0) | **Hernández** (0–1) | Kimbrel (1) | 39,055 | 0–1 |

April (12–13)

| # | Date | Opponent | Score | Win | Loss | Save | Attendance | Record |
|---|---|---|---|---|---|---|---|---|
| 2 | April 2 | Braves | 6–3 | **Lannan** (1–0) | Hanson (0–1) | **Burnett** (1) | 21,941 | 1–1 |
| 3 | April 3 | Braves | 11 – 2 | Hudson (1–0) | **Zimmermann** (0–1) | | 22,210 | 1–2 |
| 4 | April 5 | @ Marlins | 3–2 (10) | Mujica (1–0) | **Storen** (0–1) | | 10,482 | 1–3 |
| 5 | April 6 | @ Marlins | 7–4 | Sanches (1–0) | **Gaudin** (0–1) | Oviedo (1) | 13,825 | 1–4 |
| 6 | April 7 | @ Marlins | 5–3 (11) | **Coffey** (1–0) | Mujica (1–1) | **Burnett** (2) | 10,696 | 2–4 |
| 7 | April 8 | @ Mets | 6–2 | **Zimmermann** (1–1) | Dickey (1–1) | | 41,075 | 3–4 |
| 8 | April 9 | @ Mets | 8–4 | Capuano (1–0) | **Gorzelanny** (0–1) | Rodríguez (1) | 31,696 | 3–5 |
| 9 | April 10 | @ Mets | 7–3 (11) | **Storen** (1–1) | Boyer (0–2) | | 35,157 | 4–5 |
| 10 | April 12 | Phillies | 7–4 | **Hernández** (1–1) | Blanton (0–1) | **Burnett** (3) | 13,413 | 5–5 |
| 11 | April 13 | Phillies | 3–2 | Halladay (2–0) | **Lannan** (1–1) | | 16,914 | 5–6 |
| 12 | April 14 | Phillies | 4–0 | Lee (2–1) | **Zimmermann** (1–2) | | 24,875 | 5–7 |
| 13 | April 15 | Brewers | 4–3 (10) | **Gaudin** (1–1) | Braddock (0–1) | | 17,217 | 6–7 |
| – | April 16 | Brewers | Postponed (rain) Rescheduled for April 17 as part of a doubleheader | | | | | |
| 14 | April 17 (1) | Brewers | 8–4 | **Marquis** (1–0) | Gallardo (1–1) | | 23,047 (Note: The two games on April 17 were played as a single-admission doubleheader with attendance counted only for the two games combined.) | 7–7 |
| 15 | April 17 (2) | Brewers | 5–1 | **Hernández** (2–1) | Loe (1–1) | **Storen** (1) | 23,047 | 8–7 |
| – | April 19 | @ Cardinals | Postponed (rain) Rescheduled for April 20 as part of a doubleheader | | | | | |
| 16 | April 20 (1) | @ Cardinals | 8–6 | **Lannan** (2–1) | Westbrook (1–2) | **Storen** (2) | 32,340 | 9–7 |
| 17 | April 20 (2) | @ Cardinals | 5–3 | García (3–0) | **Zimmermann** (1–3) | Boggs (1) | 33,714 | 9–8 |
| 18 | April 21 | @ Cardinals | 5–0 | Lohse (3–1) | **Gorzelanny** (0–2) | | 36,160 | 9–9 |
| – | April 22 | @ Pirates | Postponed (rain) Rescheduled for April 25 | | | | | |
| 19 | April 23 | @ Pirates | 7–2 | Karstens (2–0) | **Hernández** (2–2) | | 18,262 | 9–10 |
| 20 | April 24 | @ Pirates | 6–3 | **Marquis** (2–0) | Correia (3–2) | **Storen** (3) | 9,520 | 10–10 |
| 21 | April 25 | @ Pirates | 4–2 | Maholm (1–3) | **Lannan** (2–2) | Hanrahan (6) | 12,457 | 10–11 |
| 22 | April 26 | Mets | 6–4 | Igarashi (1–0) | **Zimmermann** (1–4) | Rodríguez (5) | 14,603 | 10–12 |
| 23 | April 27 | Mets | 6–3 | Beato (1–0) | **Burnett** (0–1) | Rodríguez (6) | 13,568 | 10–13 |
| 24 | April 28 | Mets | 4–3 | **Hernández** (3–2) | Capuano (2–2) | **Storen** (4) | 15,142 | 11–13 |
| 25 | April 29 | Giants | 3–0 | **Marquis** (3–0) | Lincecum (2–3) | | 21,399 | 12–13 |
| 26 | April 30 | Giants | 2–1 | Mota (2–0) | **Lannan** (2–3) | Wilson (8) | 28,766 | 12–14 |

May (11–17)

| # | Date | Opponent | Score | Win | Loss | Save | Attendance | Record |
|---|---|---|---|---|---|---|---|---|
| 27 | May 1 | Giants | 5–2 | **Zimmermann** (2–4) | Cain (2–2) | **Storen** (5) | 21,611 | 13–14 |
| 28 | May 2 | Giants | 2–0 | **Gorzelanny** (1–2) | Bumgarner (0–5) | **Storen** (6) | 15,342 | 14–14 |
| 29 | May 3 | @ Phillies | 4–1 | Hamels (4–1) | **Hernández** (3–3) | | 45,695 | 14–15 |
| 30 | May 4 | @ Phillies | 7–4 | Worley (2–0) | **Marquis** (3–1) | | 44,123 | 14–16 |
| 31 | May 5 | @ Phillies | 7–3 | Halladay (5–1) | **Lannan** (2–4) | | 45,316 | 14–17 |
| 32 | May 6 | @ Marlins | 3–2 (10) | **Storen** (2–1) | Dunn (2–2) | **Burnett** (4) | 15,325 | 15–17 |
| 33 | May 7 | @ Marlins | 5–2 | **Gorzelanny** (2–2) | Volstad (2–2) | **Storen** (7) | 17,409 | 16–17 |
| 34 | May 8 | @ Marlins | 8–0 | Sánchez (2–1) | **Hernández** (3–4) | | 10,523 | 16–18 |
| 35 | May 10 | @ Braves | 7–6 | **Marquis** (4–1) | Hudson (4–3) | **Storen** (8) | 16,143 | 17–18 |
| 36 | May 11 | @ Braves | 7–3 (11) | **Storen** (3–1) | Linebrink (0–1) | | 16,692 | 18–18 |
| 37 | May 12 | @ Braves | 6–5 (10) | Kimbrel (1–1) | **Slaten** (0–1) | | 19,758 | 18–19 |
| 38 | May 13 | Marlins | 6–5 (11) | Mujica (4–1) | **Broderick** (0–1) | Oviedo (13) | 19,503 | 18–20 |
| 39 | May 14 | Marlins | 1–0 | Sánchez (3–1) | **Hernández** (3–5) | Oviedo (14) | 22,497 | 18–21 |
| 40 | May 15 | Marlins | 8–4 | **Marquis** (5–1) | Vázquez (2–4) | | 18,356 | 19–21 |
| 41 | May 16 | Pirates | 4–2 | **Kimball** (1–0) | Maholm (1–6) | **Storen** (9) | 21,960 | 20–21 |
| – | May 17 | Pirates | Postponed (rain) Rescheduled for July 2 as part of a doubleheader | | | | | |
| 42 | May 18 | @ Mets | 3–0 | Niese (3–4) | **Gorzelanny** (2–3) | Rodríguez (13) | 24,527 | 20–22 |
| 43 | May 19 | @ Mets | 1–0 | Gee (3–0) | **Hernández** (3–6) | Rodríguez (14) | 26,835 | 20–23 |
| 44 | May 20 | @ Orioles | 17 – 5 | **Rodríguez** (1–0) | Arrieta (5–2) | | 24,442 | 21–23 |
| 45 | May 21 | @ Orioles | 8–3 | Guthrie (2–6) | **Lannan** (2–5) | | 33,107 | 21–24 |
| 46 | May 22 | @ Orioles | 2–1 | Johnson (3–1) | **Zimmermann** (2–5) | Gregg (8) | 33,626 | 21–25 |
| 47 | May 23 | @ Brewers | 11 – 3 | Gallardo (6–2) | **Gorzelanny** (2–4) | | 22,906 | 21–26 |
| 48 | May 24 | @ Brewers | 7–6 | McClendon (2–0) | **Rodríguez** (1–1) | Axford (13) | 24,722 | 21–27 |
| 49 | May 25 | @ Brewers | 6–4 | Greinke (3–1) | **Marquis** (5–2) | Loe (1) | 34,419 | 21–28 |
| 50 | May 27 | Padres | 2–1 | **Storen** (4–1) | Adams (2–1) | | 21,024 | 22–28 |
| 51 | May 28 | Padres | 2–1 | Stauffer (1–3) | **Zimmermann** (2–6) | Bell (11) | 19,159 | 22–29 |
| 52 | May 29 | Padres | 5–4 | Gregerson (2–1) | **Storen** (4–2) | Bell (12) | 23,169 | 22–30 |
| 53 | May 30 | Phillies | 5–4 | Halladay (7–3) | **Burnett** (0–2) | Madson (12) | 34,789 | 22–31 |
| 54 | May 31 | Phillies | 10 – 2 | **Marquis** (6–2) | Lee (4–5) | | 21,017 | 23–31 |

June (17–10)

| # | Date | Opponent | Score | Win | Loss | Save | Attendance | Record |
|---|---|---|---|---|---|---|---|---|
| 55 | June 1 | Phillies | 2–1 | **Lannan** (3–5) | Oswalt (3–3) | **Storen** (10) | 24,495 | 24–31 |
| 56 | June 2 | @ Diamondbacks | 6–1 | **Zimmermann** (3–6) | Duke (1–1) | **Storen** (11) | 17,810 | 25–31 |
| 57 | June 3 | @ Diamondbacks | 4–0 | Collmenter (4–1) | **Maya** (0–1) | | 20,332 | 25–32 |
| 58 | June 4 | @ Diamondbacks | 2–0 | Saunders (3–5) | **Hernández** (3–7) | Putz (17) | 26,199 | 25–33 |
| 59 | June 5 | @ Diamondbacks | 9–4 (11) | **Burnett** (1–2) | Paterson (0–1) | | 23,129 | 26–33 |
| 60 | June 6 | @ Giants | 5–4 (13) | López (3–1) | **Stammen** (0–1) | | 41,180 | 26–34 |
| 61 | June 7 | @ Giants | 2–1 | **Zimmermann** (4–6) | Sánchez (4–4) | **Storen** (12) | 41,786 | 27–34 |
| 62 | June 8 | @ Giants | 3–1 | Cain (5–4) | **Burnett** (1–3) | | 41,738 | 27–35 |
| 63 | June 9 | @ Padres | 7–3 | Harang (7–2) | **Hernández** (3–8) | | 16,464 | 27–36 |
| 64 | June 10 | @ Padres | 2–1 | **Marquis** (7–2) | Latos (4–7) | **Storen** (13) | 23,211 | 28–36 |
| 65 | June 11 | @ Padres | 2–1 | **Lannan** (4–5) | Richard (2–8) | **Storen** (14) | 25,027 | 29–36 |
| 66 | June 12 | @ Padres | 2–0 | **Coffey** (2–0) | Bell (2–3) | **Storen** (15) | 20,185 | 30–36 |
| 67 | June 14 | Cardinals | 8–6 | **Rodríguez** (2–1) | Batista (3–2) | **Storen** (16) | 26,739 | 31–36 |
| 68 | June 15 | Cardinals | 10 – 0 | **Hernández** (4–8) | McClellan (6–3) | | 27,130 | 32–36 |
| 69 | June 16 | Cardinals | 7–4 (10) | **Burnett** (2–3) | Salas (3–1) | | 19,662 | 33–36 |
| 70 | June 17 | Orioles | 8–4 | **Burnett** (3–3) | Accardo (3–3) | | 35,562 | 34–36 |
| 71 | June 18 | Orioles | 4–2 | **Zimmermann** (5–6) | Matusz (1–2) | **Storen** (17) | 36,614 | 35–36 |
| 72 | June 19 | Orioles | 7–4 | Jakubauskas (2–0) | **Gorzelanny** (2–5) | | 35,439 | 35–37 |
| 73 | June 21 | Mariners | 6–5 | **Coffey** (3–0) | Pauley (4–1) | | 21,502 | 36–37 |
| 74 | June 22 | Mariners | 2–1 | **Lannan** (5–5) | Bédard (4–5) | **Storen** (18) | 21,367 | 37–37 |
| 75 | June 23 | Mariners | 1–0 | **Clippard** (1–0) | Ray (3–2) | | 21,161 | 38–37 |
| 76 | June 24 | @ White Sox | 9–5 (14) | **Balester** (1–0) | Thornton (0–4) | | 23,856 | 39–37 |
| 77 | June 25 | @ White Sox | 3–0 | Peavy (4–1) | **Gorzelanny** (2–6) | Santos (15) | 23,008 | 39–38 |
| 78 | June 26 | @ White Sox | 2–1 | **Hernández** (5–8) | Humber (7–4) | **Storen** (19) | 24,057 | 40–38 |
| 79 | June 27 | @ Angels | 4–3 (10) | Downs (5–2) | **Burnett** (3–4) | | 35,032 | 40–39 |
| 80 | June 28 | @ Angels | 11 – 5 | Takahashi (2–1) | **Balester** (1–1) | | 41,029 | 40–40 |
| 81 | June 29 | @ Angels | 1–0 | Haren (8–5) | **Zimmermann** (5–7) | Walden (18) | 35,257 | 40–41 |

July (11–15)

| # | Date | Opponent | Score | Win | Loss | Save | Attendance | Record |
|---|---|---|---|---|---|---|---|---|
| 82 | July 1 | Pirates | 2–1 | **Storen** (5–2) | Wood (0–3) | | 22,399 | 41–41 |
| 83 | July 2 (1) | Pirates | 5–3 | Veras (2–2) | **Burnett** (3–5) | Hanrahan (24) | 39,638 (Note: The two games on July 2 were played as a single-admission doubleheader with attendance counted only for the two games combined.) | 41–42 |
| 84 | July 2 (2) | Pirates | 4–3 | **Mattheus** (1–0) | Watson (0–1) | **Storen** (20) | 39,638 | 42–42 |
| 85 | July 3 | Pirates | 10 – 2 | Correia (11–6) | **Marquis** (7–3) | | 23,522 | 42–43 |
| 86 | July 4 | Cubs | 5–4 (10) | **Rodríguez** (3–1) | Mateo (1–2) | | 32,937 | 43–43 |
| 87 | July 5 | Cubs | 3–2 | **Detwiler** (1–0) | Ortiz (0–1) | **Storen** (21) | 19,181 | 44–43 |
| 88 | July 6 | Cubs | 5–4 | **Mattheus** (2–0) | Wood (1–4) | **Storen** (22) | 19,631 | 45–43 |
| 89 | July 7 | Cubs | 10 – 9 | Marshall (5–2) | **Rodríguez** (3–2) | Mármol (18) | 22,016 | 45–44 |
| 90 | July 8 | Rockies | 3–2 | Hammel (5–8) | **Lannan** (5–6) | Street (25) | 19,046 | 45–45 |
| 91 | July 9 | Rockies | 2–1 | Jiménez (4–8) | **Marquis** (7–4) | Street (26) | 29,441 | 45–46 |
| 92 | July 10 | Rockies | 2–0 | **Zimmermann** (6–7) | Chacín (8–7) | **Storen** (23) | 21,186 | 46–46 |
**All–Star Break (July 11–14)**
| 93 | July 15 | @ Braves | 11 – 1 | Hudson (9–6) | **Hernández** (5–9) | | 34,106 | 46–47 |
| 94 | July 16 | @ Braves | 5–2 | **Lannan** (6–6) | Hanson (10–5) | **Storen** (24) | 42,456 | 47–47 |
| 95 | July 17 | @ Braves | 9–8 | Kimbrel (3–2) | **Mattheus** (2–1) | | 30,314 | 47–48 |
| 96 | July 18 | @ Astros | 5–2 | **Marquis** (8–4) | Lyles (0–5) | **Storen** (25) | 28,975 | 48–48 |
| 97 | July 19 | @ Astros | 7–6 | Happ (4–11) | **Zimmermann** (6–8) | Melançon (8) | 32,418 | 48–49 |
| 98 | July 20 | @ Astros | 3–2 (11) | López (2–4) | **Coffey** (3–1) | | 29,605 | 48–50 |
| 99 | July 22 | @ Dodgers | 7–2 | **Lannan** (7–6) | Kuroda (6–12) | | 39,839 | 49–50 |
| 100 | July 23 | @ Dodgers | 7–6 | Guerra (2–0) | **Mattheus** (2–2) | | 34,590 | 49–51 |
| 101 | July 24 | @ Dodgers | 3–1 | Billingsley (9–8) | **Marquis** (8–5) | Guerra (7) | 36,458 | 49–52 |
| 102 | July 26 | Marlins | 11 – 2 | Nolasco (7–7) | **Zimmermann** (6–9) | | 24,650 | 49–53 |
| 103 | July 27 | Marlins | 7–5 | Vázquez (7–9) | **Hernández** (5–10) | Oviedo (29) | 21,974 | 49–54 |
| 104 | July 28 | Marlins | 5–2 | Sanches (4–1) | **Lannan** (7–7) | | 24,153 | 49–55 |
| 105 | July 29 | Mets | 8–5 | Gee (10–3) | **Wang** (0–1) | Isringhausen (5) | 30,114 | 49–56 |
| 106 | July 30 | Mets | 3–0 | **Maya** (1–1) | Dickey (5–9) | **Storen** (26) | 35,414 | 50–56 |
| 107 | July 31 | Mets | 3–2 | **Storen** (6–2) | Parnell (3–3) | | 25,307 | 51–56 |

August (12–15)

| # | Date | Opponent | Score | Win | Loss | Save | Attendance | Record |
|---|---|---|---|---|---|---|---|---|
| 108 | August 1 | Braves | 5–3 | **Hernández** (6–10) | Jurrjens (12–4) | **Storen** (27) | 19,940 | 52–56 |
| 109 | August 2 | Braves | 9–3 | **Lannan** (8–7) | Lowe (6–10) | | 24,326 | 53–56 |
| 110 | August 3 | Braves | 6–4 | Beachy (5–2) | **Wang** (0–2) | Kimbrel (32) | 20,043 | 53–57 |
| 111 | August 4 | @ Rockies | 6–3 | Rogers (5–1) | **Detwiler** (1–1) | | 35,956 | 53–58 |
| 112 | August 5 | @ Rockies | 5–3 | **Zimmermann** (7–9) | Nicasio (4–4) | **Storen** (28) | 35,034 | 54–58 |
| 113 | August 6 | @ Rockies | 15 – 7 | Chacín (9–8) | **Hernández** (6–11) | | 43,321 | 54–59 |
| 114 | August 7 | @ Rockies | 3–2 | **Clippard** (2–0) | Bélisle (5–4) | **Storen** (29) | 34,812 | 55–59 |
| – | August 8 | @ Cubs | Postponed (rain) Rescheduled for August 11 | | | | | |
| 115 | August 9 | @ Cubs | 3–1 | **Wang** (1–2) | Garza (5–9) | **Storen** (30) | 37,109 | 56–59 |
| 116 | August 10 | @ Cubs | 4–2 | López (3–3) | **Detwiler** (1–2) | Mármol (25) | 38,010 | 56–60 |
| 117 | August 11 | @ Cubs | 4–3 | Dempster (10–8) | **Zimmermann** (7–10) | Mármol (26) | 34,733 | 56–61 |
| 118 | August 12 | @ Phillies | 4–2 | **Hernández** (7–11) | Hamels (13–7) | **Storen** (31) | 45,762 | 57–61 |
| 119 | August 13 | @ Phillies | 11 – 3 | Oswalt (5–7) | **Lannan** (8–8) | | 45,570 | 57–62 |
| – | August 14 | @ Phillies | Postponed (rain) Rescheduled for September 20 as part of a doubleheader | | | | | |
| 120 | August 16 | Reds | 6–4 | **Wang** (2–2) | Leake (10–8) | **Storen** (32) | 23,888 | 58–62 |
| 121 | August 17 | Reds | 2–1 | Cueto (9–5) | **Detwiler** (1–3) | Cordero (24) | 20,374 | 58–63 |
| 122 | August 18 | Reds | 3–1 | **Zimmermann** (8–10) | Arroyo (7–10) | **Storen** (33) | 19,508 | 59–63 |
| 123 | August 19 | Phillies | 8–4 | **Coffey** (4–1) | Madson (3–2) | | 37,841 | 60–63 |
| 124 | August 20 | Phillies | 5–0 | Oswalt (6–7) | **Lannan** (8–9) | | 44,685 | 60–64 |
| 125 | August 21 | Phillies | 5–4 (10) | **Burnett** (4–5) | Lidge (0–1) | | 41,727 | 61–64 |
| 126 | August 22 | Diamondbacks | 4–1 | **Detwiler** (2–3) | Saunders (8–11) | **Storen** (34) | 19,377 | 62–64 |
| 127 | August 23 | Diamondbacks | 2–0 | Kennedy (16–4) | **Zimmermann** (8–11) | Putz (31) | 17,029 | 62–65 |
| 128 | August 24 | Diamondbacks | 4–2 | Hudson (13–9) | **Hernández** (7–12) | Putz (32) | 17,881 | 62–66 |
| 129 | August 25 | Diamondbacks | 8–1 | Miley (1–1) | **Lannan** (8–10) | | 17,666 | 62–67 |
| 130 | August 26 | @ Reds | 4–3 | Cordero (5–3) | **Balester** (1–2) | | 35,089 | 62–68 |
| 131 | August 27 | @ Reds | 6–3 | Leake (11–8) | **Detwiler** (2–4) | Cordero (29) | 30,423 | 62–69 |
| 132 | August 28 | @ Reds | 5–4 (14) | Bray (4–2) | **Balester** (1–3) | | 28,415 | 62–70 |
| 133 | August 30 | @ Braves | 9–2 | **Hernández** (8–12) | Jurrjens (13–6) | | 16,674 | 63–70 |
| 134 | August 31 | @ Braves | 3–1 | Lowe (9–12) | **Lannan** (8–11) | Kimbrel (41) | 20,687 | 63–71 |

September (17–10)

| # | Date | Opponent | Score | Win | Loss | Save | Attendance | Record |
|---|---|---|---|---|---|---|---|---|
| 135 | September 1 | @ Braves | 5–2 | Hudson (14–8) | **Wang** (2–3) | Kimbrel (42) | 18,794 | 63–72 |
| 136 | September 2 | Mets | 7–3 | Dickey (7–11) | **Detwiler** (2–5) | | 27,907 | 63–73 |
| 137 | September 3 | Mets | 8–7 | **Burnett** (5–5) | Parnell (3–5) | | 34,821 | 64–73 |
| 138 | September 4 | Mets | 6–3 | Igarashi (3–1) | **Hernández** (8–13) | Parnell (5) | 29,679 | 64–74 |
| 139 | September 5 | Dodgers | 7–2 | **Lannan** (9–11) | Kuroda (11–15) | | 25,518 | 65–74 |
| 140 | September 6 | Dodgers | 7–3 | Jansen (2–1) | **Rodríguez** (3–3) | | 29,092 | 65–75 |
| – | September 7 | Dodgers | Postponed (rain) Rescheduled for September 8 as part of a doubleheader | | | | | |
| 141 | September 8 (1) | Dodgers | 7–4 | MacDougal (3–1) | **Storen** (6–3) | Guerra (16) | 21,638 | 65–76 |
| – | September 8 (2) | Dodgers | Cancelled (rain) No make-up game was scheduled | | | | | |
| 142 | September 9 | Astros | 4–3 (11) | **Clippard** (3–0) | Harrell (0–1) | | 18,307 | 66–76 |
| 143 | September 10 | Astros | 9–3 | Rodríguez (11–10) | **Lannan** (9–12) | | 30,935 | 66–77 |
| 144 | September 11 | Astros | 8–2 | **Gorzelanny** (3–6) | Sosa (2–4) | | 24,238 | 67–77 |
| 145 | September 12 | @ Mets | 3–2 | **Coffey** (5–1) | Dickey (8–12) | **Storen** (35) | 27,015 | 68–77 |
| 146 | September 13 | @ Mets | 3–2 | **Stammen** (1–1) | Thayer (0–2) | **Storen** (36) | 25,359 | 69–77 |
| 147 | September 14 | @ Mets | 2–0 | **Peacock** (1–0) | Pelfrey (7–12) | **Storen** (37) | 26,885 | 70–77 |
| 148 | September 15 | @ Mets | 10 – 1 | **Milone** (1–0) | Schwinden (0–2) | | 22,205 | 71–77 |
| 149 | September 16 | Marlins | 3–0 | Vázquez (11–11) | **Lannan** (9–13) | | 22,932 | 71–78 |
| 150 | September 17 | Marlins | 4–1 (13) | Hensley (5–6) | **Balester** (1–4) | Oviedo (36) | 33,247 | 71–79 |
| 151 | September 18 | Marlins | 4–3 | **Wang** (3–3) | Hand (1–8) | **Storen** (38) | 26,581 | 72–79 |
| 152 | September 20 (1) | @ Phillies | 4–3 (10) | **Gorzelanny** (4–6) | Stutes (6–2) | **Storen** (39) | 44,263 | 73–79 |
| 153 | September 20 (2) | @ Phillies | 3–0 | **Detwiler** (3–5) | Lee (16–8) | **Storen** (40) | 45,408 | 74–79 |
| 154 | September 21 | @ Phillies | 7–5 | **Lannan** (10–13) | Worley (11–3) | **Rodríguez** (1) | 45,083 | 75–79 |
| 155 | September 22 | @ Phillies | 6–1 | **Peacock** (2–0) | Oswalt (8–10) | | 45,064 | 76–79 |
| 156 | September 23 | Braves | 7–4 | Hudson (16–10) | **Strasburg** (0–1) | Kimbrel (46) | 28,817 | 76–80 |
| 157 | September 24 | Braves | 4–1 | **Wang** (4–3) | Beachy (7–3) | **Storen** (41) | 33,986 | 77–80 |
| 158 | September 25 | Braves | 3–0 | **Detwiler** (4–5) | Minor (5–3) | **Storen** (42) | 37,638 | 78–80 |
| 159 | September 26 | @ Marlins | 6–4 | **Severino** (1–0) | Mujica (9–6) | **Rodríguez** (2) | 21,058 | 79–80 |
| 160 | September 27 | @ Marlins | 3–2 | Vázquez (13–11) | **Slaten** (0–2) | | 21,902 | 79–81 |
| 161 | September 28 | @ Marlins | 3–1 | **Strasburg** (1–1) | Volstad (5–13) | **Storen** (43) | 34,615 | 80–81 |

== Player stats ==
=== Batting ===
Table is sortable.

Note: Pos = Position; G = Games played; AB = At bats; R = Runs scored; H = Hits; 2B = Doubles; 3B = Triples; HR = Home runs; RBI = Runs batted in; AVG = Batting average; SB = Stolen bases

Complete offensive statistics are available here.

| Pos | Player | G | AB | R | H | 2B | 3B | HR | RBI | AVG | SB |
|---|---|---|---|---|---|---|---|---|---|---|---|
| C | Wilson Ramos | 113 | 389 | 48 | 104 | 22 | 1 | 15 | 52 | .267 | 0 |
| 1B | Michael Morse | 146 | 522 | 73 | 158 | 36 | 0 | 31 | 95 | .303 | 2 |
| 2B | Danny Espinosa | 158 | 573 | 72 | 135 | 29 | 5 | 21 | 66 | .236 | 17 |
| SS | Ian Desmond | 154 | 584 | 65 | 148 | 27 | 5 | 8 | 49 | .253 | 25 |
| 3B | Ryan Zimmerman | 101 | 395 | 52 | 114 | 21 | 2 | 12 | 49 | .289 | 1 |
| LF | Laynce Nix | 124 | 324 | 38 | 81 | 15 | 1 | 16 | 44 | .250 | 2 |
| CF | Rick Ankiel | 122 | 380 | 46 | 91 | 20 | 0 | 9 | 37 | .239 | 10 |
| RF | Jayson Werth | 150 | 561 | 69 | 130 | 26 | 1 | 20 | 58 | .232 | 19 |
| OF | Roger Bernadina | 91 | 309 | 40 | 75 | 12 | 2 | 7 | 27 | .243 | 17 |
| 3B | Jerry Hairston Jr. | 75 | 213 | 25 | 57 | 11 | 1 | 4 | 24 | .268 | 2 |
| 1B | Adam LaRoche | 43 | 151 | 15 | 26 | 4 | 0 | 3 | 15 | .172 | 1 |
| IF | Alex Cora | 91 | 156 | 12 | 35 | 6 | 1 | 0 | 6 | .224 | 2 |
| C | Iván "Pudge" Rodríguez | 44 | 124 | 14 | 27 | 7 | 0 | 2 | 19 | .218 | 0 |
| 1B | Chris Marrero | 31 | 109 | 6 | 27 | 5 | 0 | 0 | 10 | .248 | 0 |
| LF | Jonny Gomes | 43 | 93 | 11 | 19 | 4 | 1 | 3 | 12 | .204 | 2 |
| UT | Brian Bixler | 79 | 83 | 9 | 17 | 1 | 2 | 0 | 2 | .205 | 4 |
| C | Jesús Flores | 30 | 86 | 5 | 18 | 6 | 0 | 1 | 2 | .253 | 0 |
| UT | Matt Stairs | 56 | 65 | 4 | 10 | 1 | 0 | 0 | 2 | .154 | 0 |
| IF | Steve Lombardozzi Jr. | 13 | 31 | 3 | 6 | 1 | 0 | 0 | 1 | .194 | 0 |
| PH | Corey Brown | 3 | 3 | 0 | 0 | 0 | 0 | 0 | 0 | .000 | 0 |
| P | John Lannan | 33 | 57 | 3 | 5 | 0 | 0 | 1 | 5 | .088 | 0 |
| P | Liván Hernández | 31 | 46 | 3 | 10 | 1 | 0 | 0 | 7 | .217 | 0 |
| P | Jordan Zimmermann | 29 | 43 | 1 | 9 | 1 | 0 | 0 | 3 | .209 | 0 |
| P | Jason Marquis | 25 | 42 | 3 | 8 | 1 | 0 | 0 | 3 | .190 | 0 |
| P | Tom Gorzelanny | 30 | 28 | 2 | 3 | 0 | 0 | 0 | 1 | .107 | 0 |
| P | Ross Detwiler | 15 | 19 | 0 | 2 | 0 | 0 | 0 | 1 | .105 | 0 |
| P | Chien-Ming Wang | 11 | 19 | 0 | 1 | 0 | 0 | 0 | 1 | .053 | 0 |
| P | Tommy Milone | 5 | 6 | 1 | 1 | 0 | 0 | 1 | 3 | .167 | 0 |
| P | Yunesky Maya | 10 | 8 | 0 | 0 | 0 | 0 | 0 | 0 | .000 | 0 |
| P | Stephen Strasburg | 5 | 6 | 1 | 0 | 0 | 0 | 0 | 0 | .000 | 0 |
| P | Collin Balester | 23 | 4 | 0 | 0 | 0 | 0 | 0 | 0 | .000 | 0 |
| P | Brad Peacock | 3 | 4 | 0 | 0 | 0 | 0 | 0 | 0 | .000 | 0 |
| P | Tyler Clippard | 72 | 2 | 0 | 0 | 0 | 0 | 0 | 0 | .000 | 0 |
| P | Cole Kimball | 12 | 1 | 1 | 0 | 0 | 0 | 0 | 0 | .000 | 0 |
| P | Sean Burnett | 69 | 1 | 1 | 1 | 0 | 0 | 0 | 0 | 1.000 | 0 |
| P | Henry Rodríguez | 59 | 2 | 0 | 0 | 0 | 0 | 0 | 0 | .000 | 0 |
| P | Craig Stammen | 7 | 2 | 1 | 1 | 0 | 0 | 0 | 0 | .500 | 0 |
| P | Atahualpa Severino | 6 | 0 | 0 | 0 | 0 | 0 | 0 | 0 | – | 0 |
| P | Todd Coffey | 69 | 0 | 0 | 0 | 0 | 0 | 0 | 0 | – | 0 |
| P | Doug Slaten | 31 | 0 | 0 | 0 | 0 | 0 | 0 | 0 | – | 0 |
| P | Drew Storen | 73 | 0 | 0 | 0 | 0 | 0 | 0 | 0 | – | 0 |
| P | Ryan Mattheus | 35 | 0 | 0 | 0 | 0 | 0 | 0 | 0 | – | 0 |
| P | Chad Gaudin | 10 | 0 | 0 | 0 | 0 | 0 | 0 | 0 | – | 0 |
| P | Brian Broderick | 11 | 0 | 0 | 0 | 0 | 0 | 0 | 0 | – | 0 |
| | Team totals | 161 | 5441 | 624 | 1319 | 257 | 22 | 154 | 594 | .242 | 38 |

=== Pitching ===
Note: Pos = Position; W = Wins; L = Losses; ERA = Earned run average; G = Games pitched; GS = Games started; SV = Saves; IP = Innings pitched; H = Hits allowed; R = Runs allowed; ER = Earned runs allowed; BB = Walks allowed; K = Strikeouts

Complete pitching statistics are available here.

| Pos | Player | W | L | ERA | G | GS | SV | IP | H | R | ER | BB | K |
|---|---|---|---|---|---|---|---|---|---|---|---|---|---|
| SP | John Lannan | 10 | 13 | 3.70 | 33 | 33 | 0 | 184.2 | 194 | 90 | 76 | 76 | 106 |
| SP | Liván Hernández | 8 | 13 | 4.47 | 29 | 29 | 0 | 175.1 | 199 | 98 | 87 | 46 | 99 |
| SP | Jordan Zimmermann | 8 | 11 | 3.18 | 26 | 26 | 0 | 161.1 | 154 | 62 | 57 | 31 | 124 |
| SP | Jason Marquis | 8 | 5 | 3.95 | 20 | 20 | 0 | 120.2 | 132 | 58 | 53 | 39 | 71 |
| SP | Chien-Ming Wang | 4 | 3 | 4.04 | 11 | 11 | 0 | 62.1 | 67 | 35 | 28 | 13 | 25 |
| CL | Drew Storen | 6 | 3 | 2.75 | 73 | 0 | 43 | 75.1 | 57 | 24 | 23 | 20 | 74 |
| RP | Tyler Clippard | 3 | 0 | 1.83 | 72 | 0 | 26 | 88.1 | 48 | 18 | 18 | 26 | 104 |
| RP | Henry Rodríguez | 3 | 3 | 3.56 | 59 | 0 | 2 | 65.2 | 54 | 30 | 26 | 45 | 70 |
| RP | Todd Coffey | 5 | 1 | 3.62 | 69 | 0 | 0 | 59.2 | 55 | 25 | 24 | 20 | 46 |
| RP | Sean Burnett | 5 | 5 | 3.81 | 69 | 0 | 4 | 56.2 | 54 | 24 | 24 | 21 | 33 |
| | Tom Gorzelanny | 4 | 6 | 4.03 | 30 | 15 | 0 | 105.0 | 102 | 50 | 47 | 33 | 95 |
| | Ross Detwiler | 4 | 5 | 3.00 | 15 | 10 | 0 | 66.0 | 63 | 26 | 22 | 20 | 41 |
| | Collin Balester | 1 | 4 | 4.54 | 23 | 0 | 0 | 35.2 | 38 | 21 | 18 | 14 | 34 |
| | Yunesky Maya | 1 | 1 | 5.23 | 10 | 5 | 0 | 32.2 | 40 | 19 | 19 | 10 | 15 |
| | Ryan Mattheus | 2 | 2 | 2.81 | 35 | 0 | 0 | 32.0 | 26 | 11 | 10 | 15 | 12 |
| SP | Tommy Milone | 1 | 0 | 3.81 | 5 | 5 | 0 | 26.0 | 28 | 11 | 11 | 4 | 15 |
| SP | Stephen Strasburg | 1 | 1 | 1.50 | 5 | 5 | 0 | 24.0 | 15 | 5 | 4 | 2 | 24 |
| | Doug Slaten | 0 | 2 | 4.41 | 31 | 0 | 0 | 16.1 | 26 | 10 | 18 | 9 | 13 |
| | Cole Kimball | 1 | 0 | 1.93 | 12 | 0 | 0 | 14.0 | 8 | 3 | 3 | 11 | 11 |
| | Brian Broderick | 0 | 1 | 6.57 | 11 | 0 | 0 | 12.1 | 16 | 9 | 9 | 3 | 4 |
| | Brad Peacock | 2 | 0 | 0.75 | 3 | 2 | 0 | 12.0 | 7 | 1 | 1 | 6 | 4 |
| | Craig Stammen | 1 | 1 | 0.87 | 7 | 0 | 0 | 10.1 | 3 | 1 | 1 | 4 | 12 |
| | Chad Gaudin | 1 | 1 | 6.48 | 10 | 0 | 0 | 8.1 | 12 | 10 | 6 | 8 | 10 |
| | Atahualpa Severino | 1 | 0 | 3.86 | 6 | 0 | 0 | 4.2 | 5 | 2 | 2 | 1 | 7 |
| | Team totals | 80 | 81 | 3.58 | 161 | 161 | 49 | 1449.1 | 1403 | 643 | 577 | 477 | 1049 |

=== Team leaders ===
Qualifying players only.

==== Batting ====
| Stat | Player | Total |
|---|---|---|
| Avg. | Michael Morse | .303 |
| HR | Michael Morse | 31 |
| RBI | Michael Morse | 95 |
| R | Michael Morse | 73 |
| H | Michael Morse | 158 |
| SB | Ian Desmond | 25 |

==== Pitching ====
| Stat | Player | Total |
|---|---|---|
| W | John Lannan | 10 |
| L | Liván Hernández; John Lannan | 13; 13 |
| ERA | John Lannan | 3.70 |
| SO | Jordan Zimmermann | 124 |
| SV | Drew Storen | 43 |
| IP | John Lannan | 184.2 |

== Awards and honors ==
=== All-Stars ===
- Tyler Clippard, P

Clippard threw three pitches in the 2011 Major League Baseball All-Star Game and was its winning pitcher.

== Farm system ==
| Level | Team | League | Manager |
|---|---|---|---|
| AAA | Syracuse Chiefs | International League | Randy Knorr |
| AA | Harrisburg Senators | Eastern League | Tony Beasley |
| A | Potomac Nationals | Carolina League | Matthew LeCroy |
| A | Hagerstown Suns | South Atlantic League | Brian Daubach |
| A-Short Season | Auburn Doubledays | New York–Penn League | Gary Cathcart |
| Rookie | GCL Nationals | Gulf Coast League | Bobby Williams |
