= List of Washington Nationals Opening Day starting pitchers =

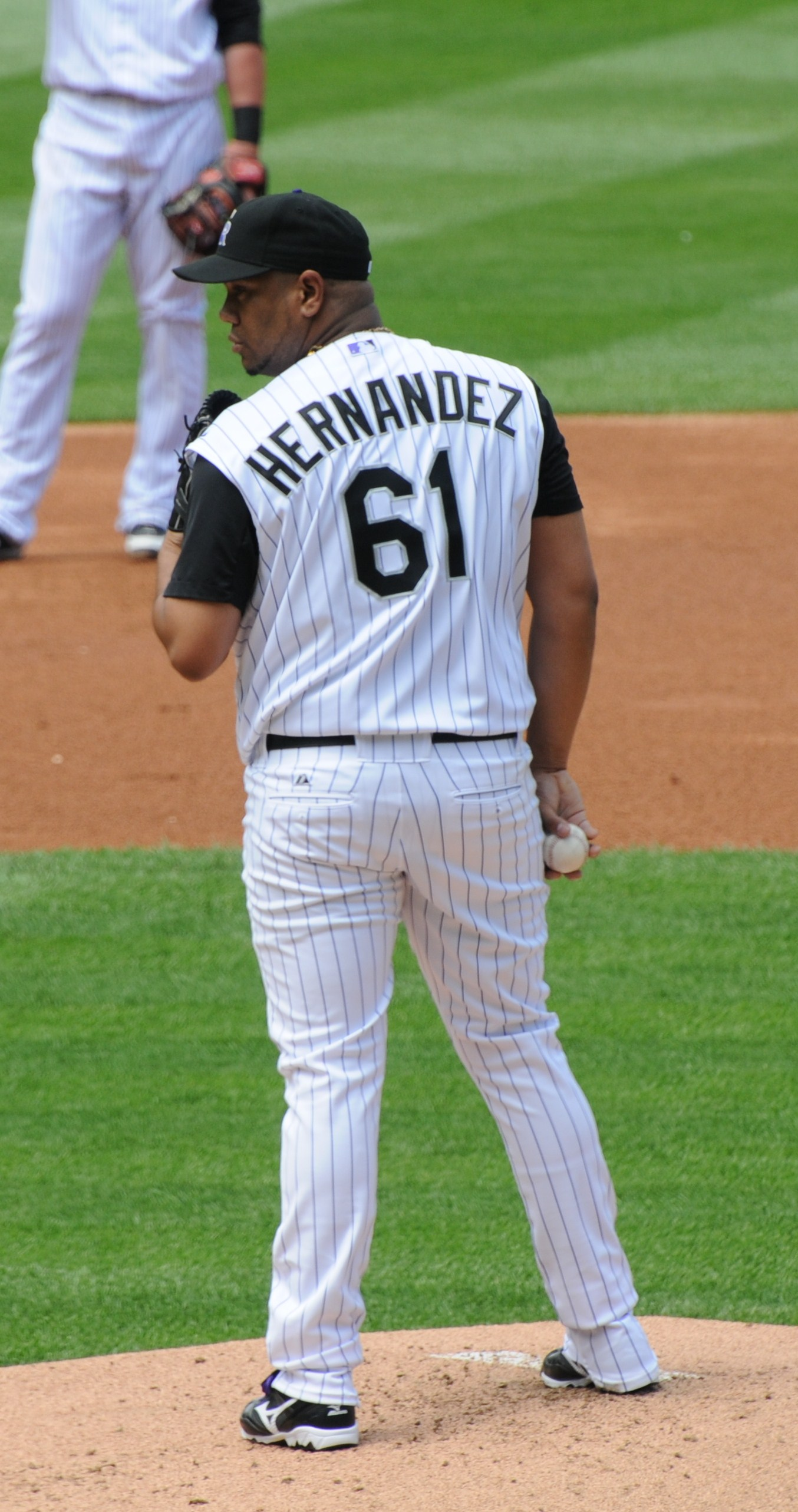
Liván Hernández, who has made a total of four Opening Day starts for the Expos/Nationals franchise.

The Washington Nationals are a Major League Baseball (MLB) franchise based in Washington, D.C. They play in the National League East division. The team was known as the Montreal Expos from 1969 to 2004. The first game of the new baseball season for a team is played on Opening Day, and being named the Opening Day starter is an honor, which is often given to the player who is expected to lead the pitching staff that season, though there are various strategic reasons why a team's best pitcher might not start on Opening Day. The Nationals have used six different Opening Day starting pitchers in their sixteen seasons. The six starters have a combined Opening Day record of 3 win, 9 losses and 4 no decisions. No decisions are awarded to the starting pitcher if the game is won or lost after the starting pitcher has left the game, or if the starting pitcher does not pitch at least five innings with the lead. The overall Opening Day record of the team is 7–9.

Max Scherzer holds the franchise record for most Opening Day starts with five. He is 1–3 on Opening Day, with one no decision.

Liván Hernández is the only pitcher to make an Opening Day start for both the Expos and the Nationals.

As the Washington Nationals, the team played their home games at Robert F. Kennedy Stadium from 2005 to 2007; their only home opener there was a 9–2 loss in 2007 by starter John Patterson. Nationals Park is the team's current field, and it was the site of the team's 2008 season opener, with starting pitcher Odalis Pérez on the mound in a game that the Nationals won 3–2 over the visiting Atlanta Braves.

== Key ==
Season	Each year is linked to an article about that particular Nationals season.
W	Win
L	Loss
ND (W)	No decision for starter; Nationals won game
ND (L)	No decision for starter; Nationals lost game
Final; Score	Game score with Nationals runs listed first
Location	**Stadium in bold** for home game
Pitcher (#)	Number of appearances as Opening Day starter with the Nationals

== Pitchers ==
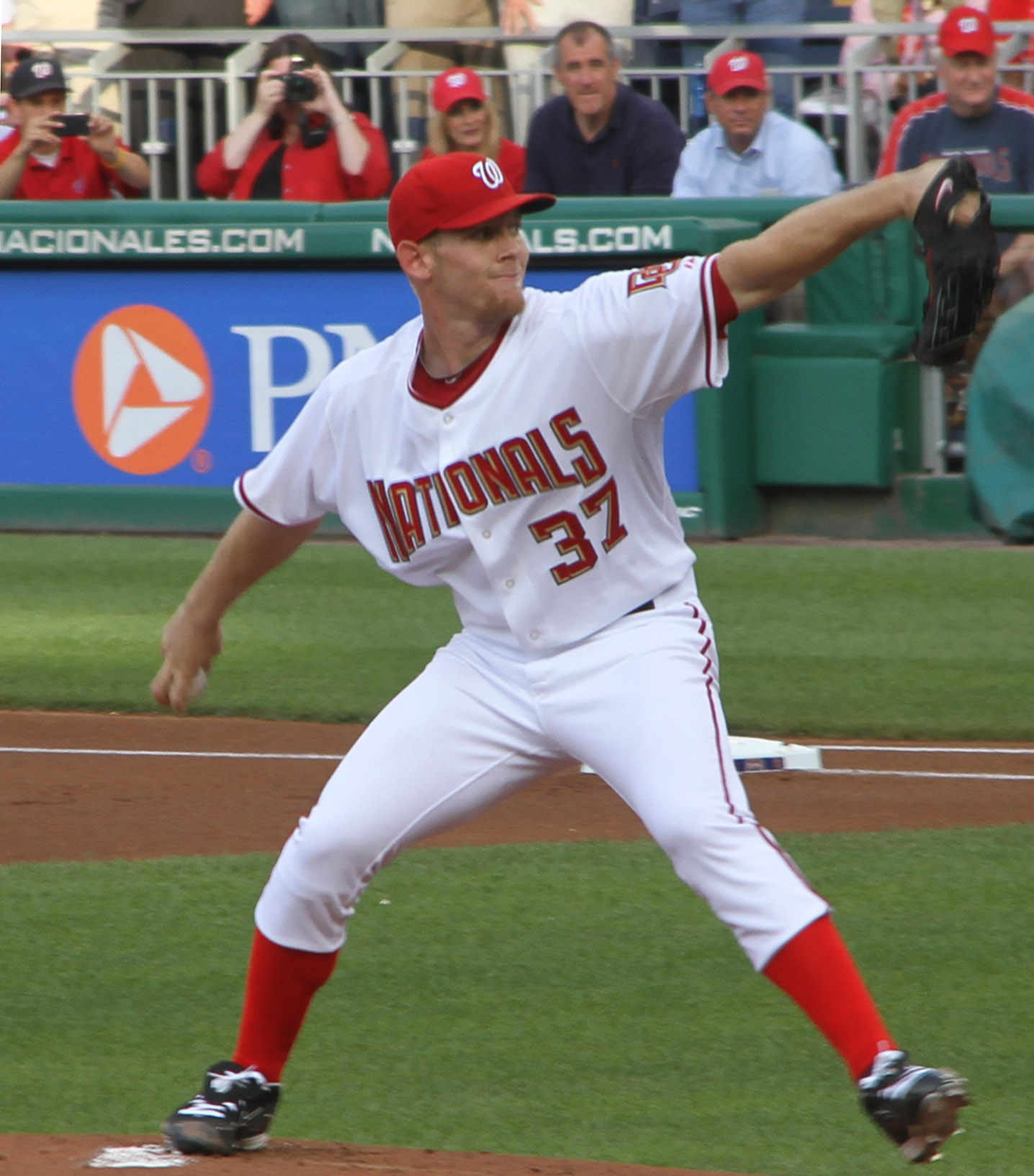
Stephen Strasburg has made four Opening Day starts for the Nationals.

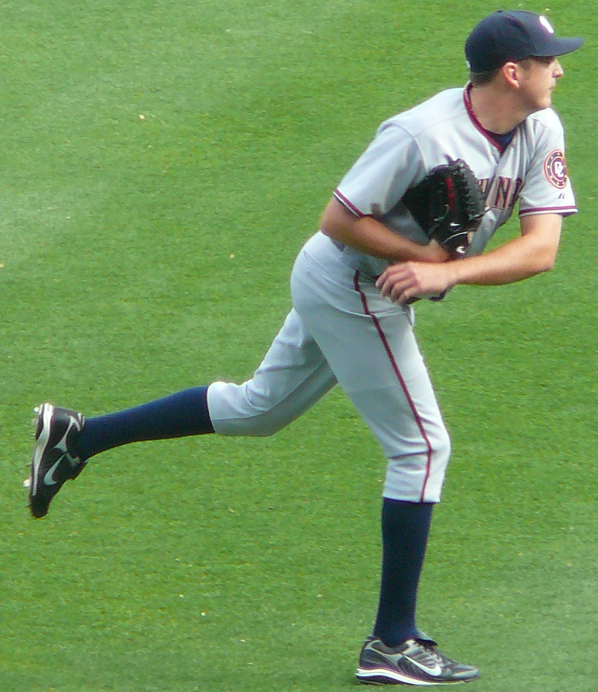
John Lannan, the 2009 and 2010 Opening Day starter

Season	Pitcher	Decision	Final score	Opponent	Location	Attendance	Ref(s)
2005	Liván Hernández	L	4–8	Philadelphia Phillies	Citizens Bank Park	44,080	
2006	Liván Hernández (2)	L	2–3	New York Mets	Shea Stadium	54,371	
2007	John Patterson	L	2–9	Florida Marlins	**Robert F. Kennedy Stadium**	40,389	
2008	Odalis Pérez	ND (W)	3–2	Atlanta Braves	**Nationals Park**	39,389	
2009	John Lannan	L	6–12	Florida Marlins	Dolphin Stadium	34,323	
2010	John Lannan (2)	L	1–11	Philadelphia Phillies	**Nationals Park**	41,290	
2011	Liván Hernández (3)	L	0–2	Atlanta Braves	**Nationals Park**	39,055	
2012	Stephen Strasburg	ND (W)	2–1	Chicago Cubs	Wrigley Field	41,176	
2013	Stephen Strasburg (2)	W	2–0	Miami Marlins	**Nationals Park**	45,274	
2014	Stephen Strasburg (3)	ND (W)	9–7	New York Mets	Citi Field	42,442	
2015	Max Scherzer	L	1–3	New York Mets	**Nationals Park**	42,295	
2016	Max Scherzer (2)	ND (W)	4–3	Atlanta Braves	Turner Field	48,282	
2017	Stephen Strasburg (4)	W	4–2	Miami Marlins	**Nationals Park**	42,744	
2018	Max Scherzer (3)	W	2–0	Cincinnati Reds	Great American Ball Park	43,878	
2019	Max Scherzer (4)	L	0–2	New York Mets	**Nationals Park**	42,263	
2020	Max Scherzer (5)	L	1–4	New York Yankees	**Nationals Park**	0	
2021	Max Scherzer (6)	ND (W)	6–5	Atlanta Braves	**Nationals Park**	4,801	
2022	Patrick Corbin	L	1–5	New York Mets	**Nationals Park**	35,052	
2023	Patrick Corbin (2)	L	2–7	Atlanta Braves	**Nationals Park**	35,756	
2024	Josiah Gray	L	2–8	Cincinnati Reds	Great American Ball Park	44,030	
2025	MacKenzie Gore	ND (L)	3–7	Philadelphia Phillies	**Nationals Park**	41,231	
2026	Cade Cavalli	ND (W)	10–4	Chicago Cubs	Wrigley Field	39,712	
