= Ian Desmond =

American baseball player (born 1985)

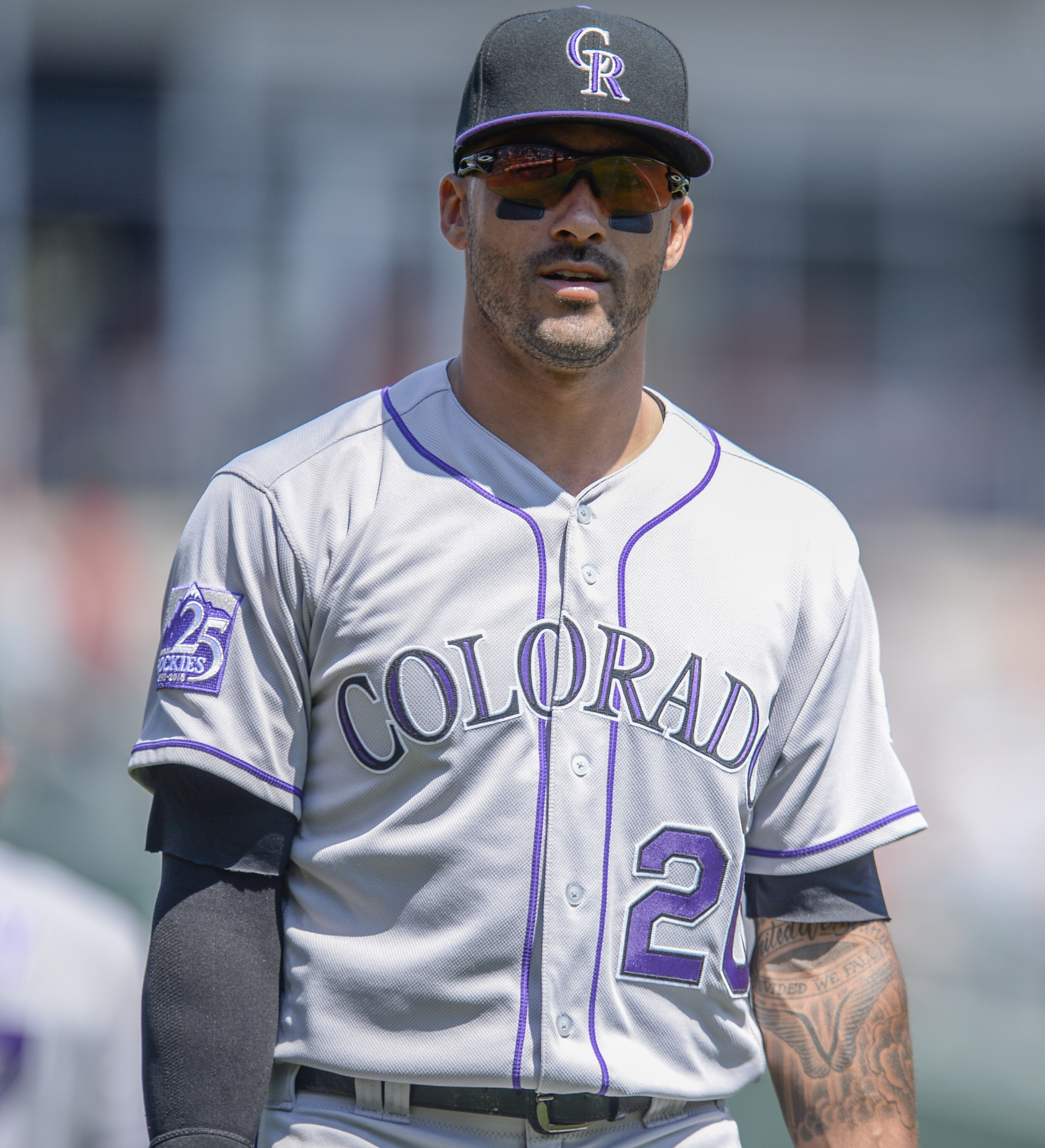
- Desmond with the Colorado Rockies in 2018
- Shortstop / Outfielder
- Born: September 20, 1985 (age 40); Sarasota, Florida, U.S.
- Batted: Right Threw: Right

MLB debut
- September 10, 2009, for the Washington Nationals

Last MLB appearance
- September 29, 2019, for the Colorado Rockies

MLB statistics
- Batting average: .263
- Home runs: 181
- Runs batted in: 711
- Stats at Baseball Reference

Teams
- Washington Nationals (2009–2015); Texas Rangers (2016); Colorado Rockies (2017–2019)

Career highlights and awards
- 2× All-Star (2012, 2016); 3× Silver Slugger Award (2012–2014)

Ian Morgan Desmond (born September 20, 1985) is an American former professional baseball shortstop and outfielder. He played 11 seasons in Major League Baseball (MLB) for the Washington Nationals, Texas Rangers and Colorado Rockies. Desmond is a three-time Silver Slugger Award winner and a two-time MLB All-Star. While primarily a shortstop early in his career, Desmond began playing primarily left field, center field, and first base starting in 2016.

== Professional career ==
=== Minor leagues ===
The Montreal Expos selected Desmond in the third round of the 2004 MLB draft (84th overall). Desmond batted .227 with one home run and 27 RBIs for the Gulf Coast League Expos in 2004. He was second in the Gulf Coast League with 216 at-bats and fifth in stolen bases with 13. He had a .250 batting average with one home run and one RBI in four games for the Class-A short-season Vermont Expos.

In 2005, Desmond batted .247 with four home runs and 23 RBIs in 73 games for Class-A Savannah Sand Gnats. He added a career-high 20 stolen bases. Desmond had a .256 batting average with three home runs and 15 RBIs in 55 games for the Class-A Advanced Potomac Nationals of the Carolina League. At season's end, he was named the best defensive shortstop in the South Atlantic League (SAL) in Baseball America's top tools survey of league managers. He was ranked as the 19th best prospect in the SAL by Baseball America.

In 2006, Desmond batted .244 with a career-high nine home runs and 45 RBIs for Potomac. He scored 50 runs and had 20 doubles in 92 games. He had a .182 batting average with no home runs and three RBIs for the Double-A Harrisburg Senators.

Desmond spent the 2007 season with Potomac and set career highs in home runs with 14, average with a .264 clip, on-base percentage with a .357 clip and doubles with 30. Desmond slugged his first homer of the season on April 17. He went 3-for-5 with a home run, double, three RBIs and scored twice on April 20. He homered in consecutive games on July 28–29 and August 12–13.

In 2008, Desmond played for Harrisburg and started the year there in 2009. In his three months there, he batted .306 and, in June, was promoted to the Triple-A Syracuse Chiefs. In 55 games with the Chiefs, he batted .354. After the minor league season ended, he was called up to the Nationals.

=== Washington Nationals ===
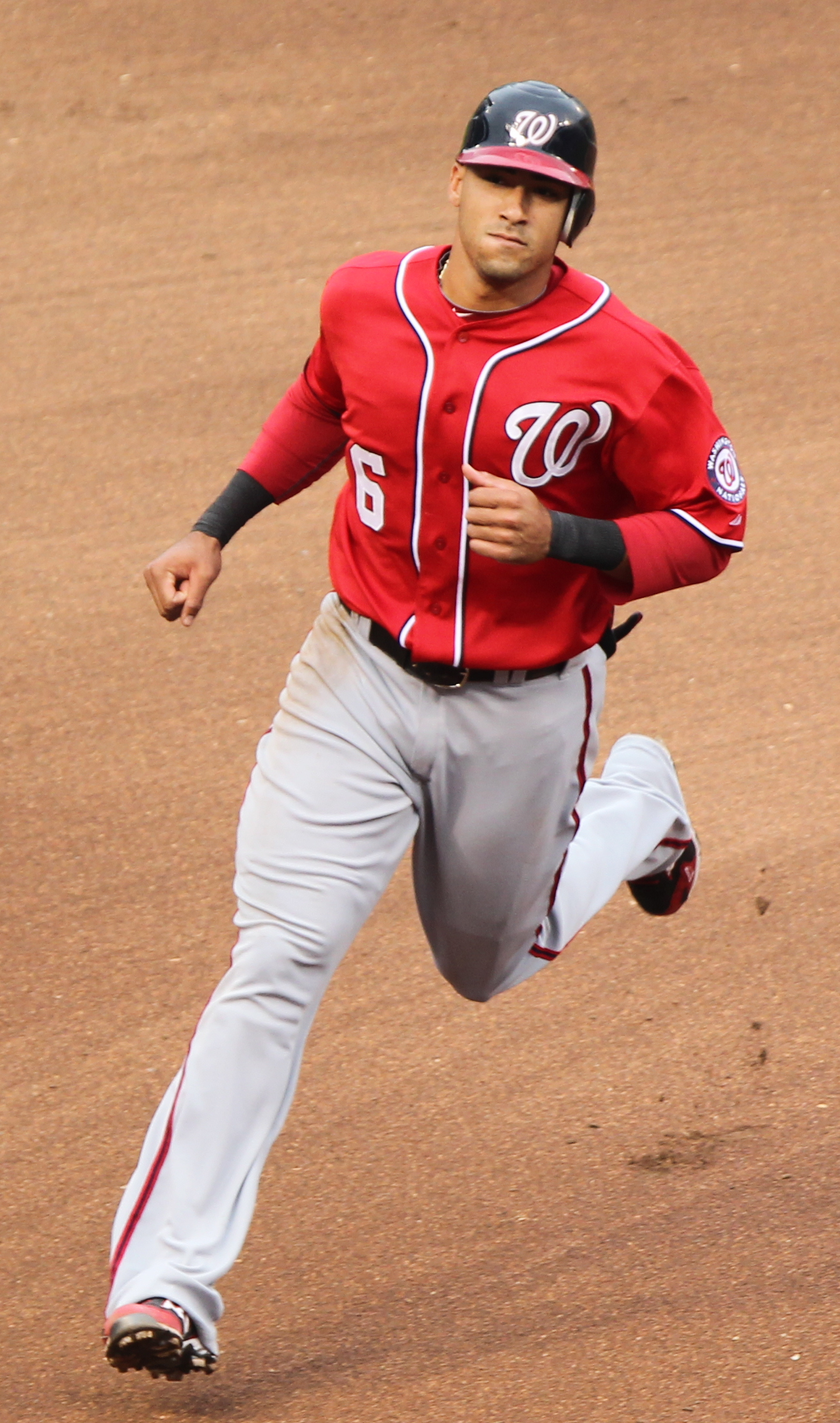
Desmond playing for the Washington Nationals in 2011

Desmond made his major league debut on September 10, 2009. In his second at-bat, Desmond got his first career hit and RBI with a double and later hit his first career home run in his 3rd at bat. He followed that up with a 4-for-4 game, and become only the second player ever (along with Guy Sturdy of the 1927 St. Louis Browns) to record at least six hits and four RBI in his first two games as a major leaguer.

On March 28, 2010, after a solid spring training in which he led the team in RBIs, Desmond earned the Nationals' starting shortstop job, beating out incumbent Cristian Guzmán. His first full year was a bit erratic. He booted the first ball that came to him and in the next game, hit the first home run of the season for the Nationals. Desmond ended the season batting .269 with 10 home runs and 65 runs batted in while stealing 17 bases.

In 2011 he batted .253/.298/.358 in 154 games. He stole a career-high 25 bases.

Desmond switched his uniform number to 20 at the beginning of the 2012 season to honor Frank Robinson. On Opening Day, Desmond started at shortstop and hit leadoff for the Nationals, who played at the Cubs. Desmond was selected for the 2012 All Star Game, his first such selection. However, on Saturday, July 7, it was announced that Desmond was withdrawing from the game due to a sore oblique. The oblique injury persisted, forcing the Nationals to place Desmond on the 15-day disabled list on July 23.

At the encouragement of manager Davey Johnson, Desmond became a very aggressive hitter. He was second in the National League, and seventh in the majors, in percent of pitches swung at in the 2012 season (55%). With his 18th home run of the season on August 20, Desmond set a franchise record for homers by a shortstop. On September 24, Desmond became the first Nationals player since 2006 to join the 20 home run – 20 steal club when he stole his 20th base. He had already hit 24 home runs. Desmond was awarded a Silver Slugger for his offensive prowess in the 2012 season.

In 2013, Desmond repeated both his 20 home run – 20 steal season and his Silver Slugger Award. He batted .280 with 20 home runs, 80 runs batted in and 21 stolen bases in 158 games played.

Prior to the 2014 season, the Nationals offered Desmond a seven-year, $104 million extension that would have made him one of the highest paid shortstops in the MLB. Desmond declined the offer and instead signed a two-year, $17.5 million deal which would allow him to forgo his last two years of salary arbitration prior to becoming a free agent after the 2015 season.

2014 saw Desmond win his third straight Silver Slugger at shortstop, batting .255/.313/.430 with 24 home runs and 91 RBI. He also was 2nd in the league in power-speed number (24.0).

Desmond struggled both offensively and defensively throughout the 2015 season. In 156 games, he hit .233/.290/.384 with 19 home runs and 62 RBI, and committed 27 errors in the field. At the end of the season, he became a free agent.

=== Texas Rangers ===
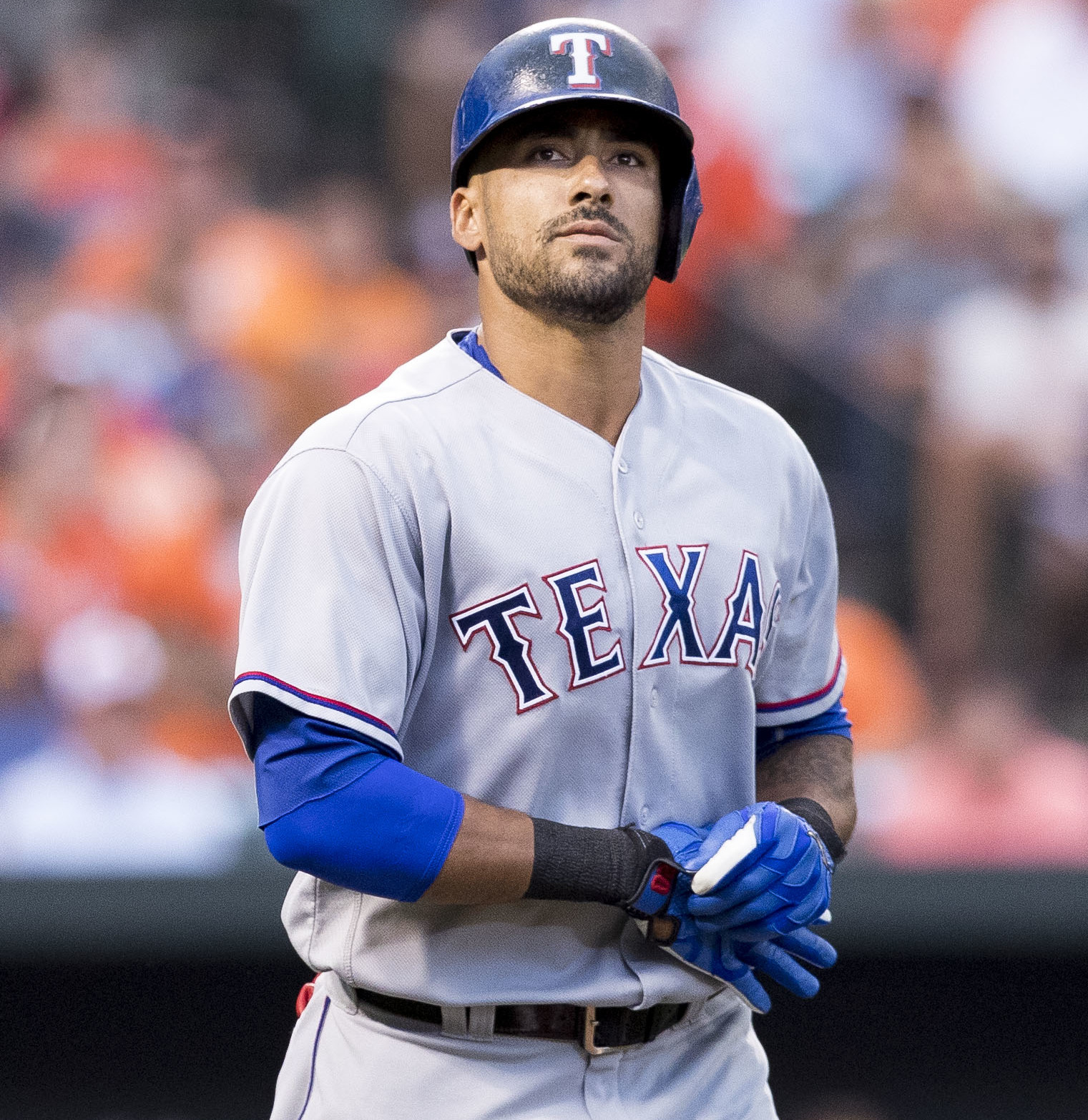
Desmond with the Texas Rangers in 2016

After rejecting a $15.8 million qualifying offer from the Nationals, Desmond remained a free agent until February 29, 2016, when he signed a one-year, $8 million contract with the Texas Rangers. Desmond was expected to play primarily in the outfield rather than as a shortstop for the Rangers. He made his first appearances in left and center field during Cactus League action in March 2016.

Desmond was selected as an American League All-Star to represent the Rangers at the 2016 Major League Baseball All-Star Game in San Diego along with teammate Cole Hamels. Prior to the game, Desmond was batting .322 with 15 home runs and 55 RBIs. Desmond finished the 2016 season with a batting average of .285, 22 home runs, and 86 RBIs. The Rangers lost in the 2016 ALDS, being swept by the Blue Jays in three games. In the series, Desmond went 3-for-14 (.214) with two runs batted in (RBI), collecting all of his hits and RBIs in the same game (Game 2) for his third career three-hit game in the postseason.

=== Colorado Rockies ===
On December 13, 2016, Desmond signed a five-year, $70 million contract with the Colorado Rockies, with a team option for a 6th year. During a spring training game on March 13, 2017, Desmond was hit by a pitch on his left hand. The injury resulted in a metacarpal fracture, requiring surgery. He appeared in his first game for the Rockies on April 30 in left field, due to the strong play of first baseman Mark Reynolds.

In 2018, he batted .236/.307/.422. For the 2018 season, he had the highest ground ball percentage of all major league hitters (62.0%).

In 2019, Desmond hit .255 with 20 home runs and 65 RBIs in 140 games. On June 10, 2019, Desmond hit the fifth-longest home run of the 2019 season at Coors Field with a 486-foot (148 m) home run off of Mike Montgomery.

As a result of the COVID-19 pandemic, Desmond chose to opt out of the 2020 MLB season. On February 21, 2021, Desmond announced via his Instagram page that he had decided to opt out of the 2021 season. Desmond forfeited his salary in both the 2020 and 2021 seasons by opting out, which essentially turned his 5 year, $70 million contract into a 3 year, $45 million contract. He became a free agent on November 4, 2021, after the Rockies declined the $15 million option for the 2022 season, instead paying him a $2 million buyout. Desmond was the Rockies' nominee for the Roberto Clemente Award in each of his 5 seasons with the Rockies for his community work and philanthropic efforts off the field.

On April 16, 2022, Desmond, a free agent at the time, officially announced his retirement from professional baseball.

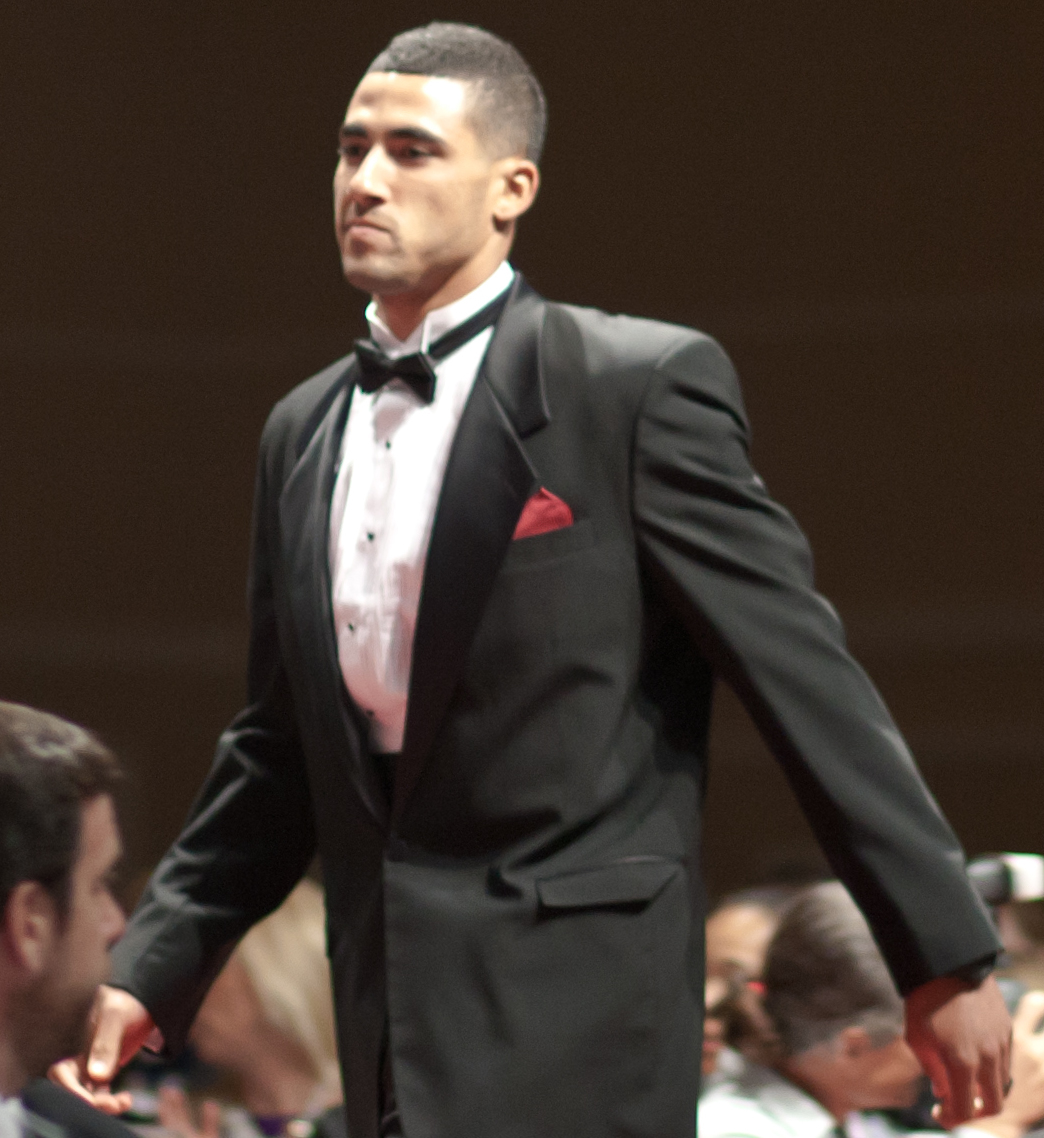
Desmond in 2011

== Personal life ==
Desmond has a younger brother, Chris Charron. Desmond and former major league player Josh Roenicke are brothers-in-law; Roenicke, a pitcher who played for the Minnesota Twins through 2013 and signed a minor league deal with the Nationals for 2014, married Desmond's sister Nikki in 2010. In January 2010, Ian married his wife Chelsey, whom he met in fifth grade. The couple has five children together. When his first child was born, Desmond became one of the first players to claim paternity leave, which had just been introduced to MLB. The family lives in Sarasota, Florida.

While with the Nationals, Desmond served on the board of the Washington Nationals Youth Baseball Academy, which opened in 2014.

Desmond is a national spokesperson for the Children's Tumor Foundation.

In 2020, Desmond co-founded Newtown Connection, a non-profit organization based in his hometown, which aims to help underserved youth in the Sarasota, Florida area through "academic enrichment, physical activity, and health education" and to "promote character development and an active lifestyle, instilling the values of leadership, accountability, teamwork, and the pursuit of excellence."

Desmond is related to Viola Desmond, a Canadian civil rights activist.

He was raised Catholic.
