= Henry Rodríguez (pitcher) =

Venezuelan baseball player (born 1987)

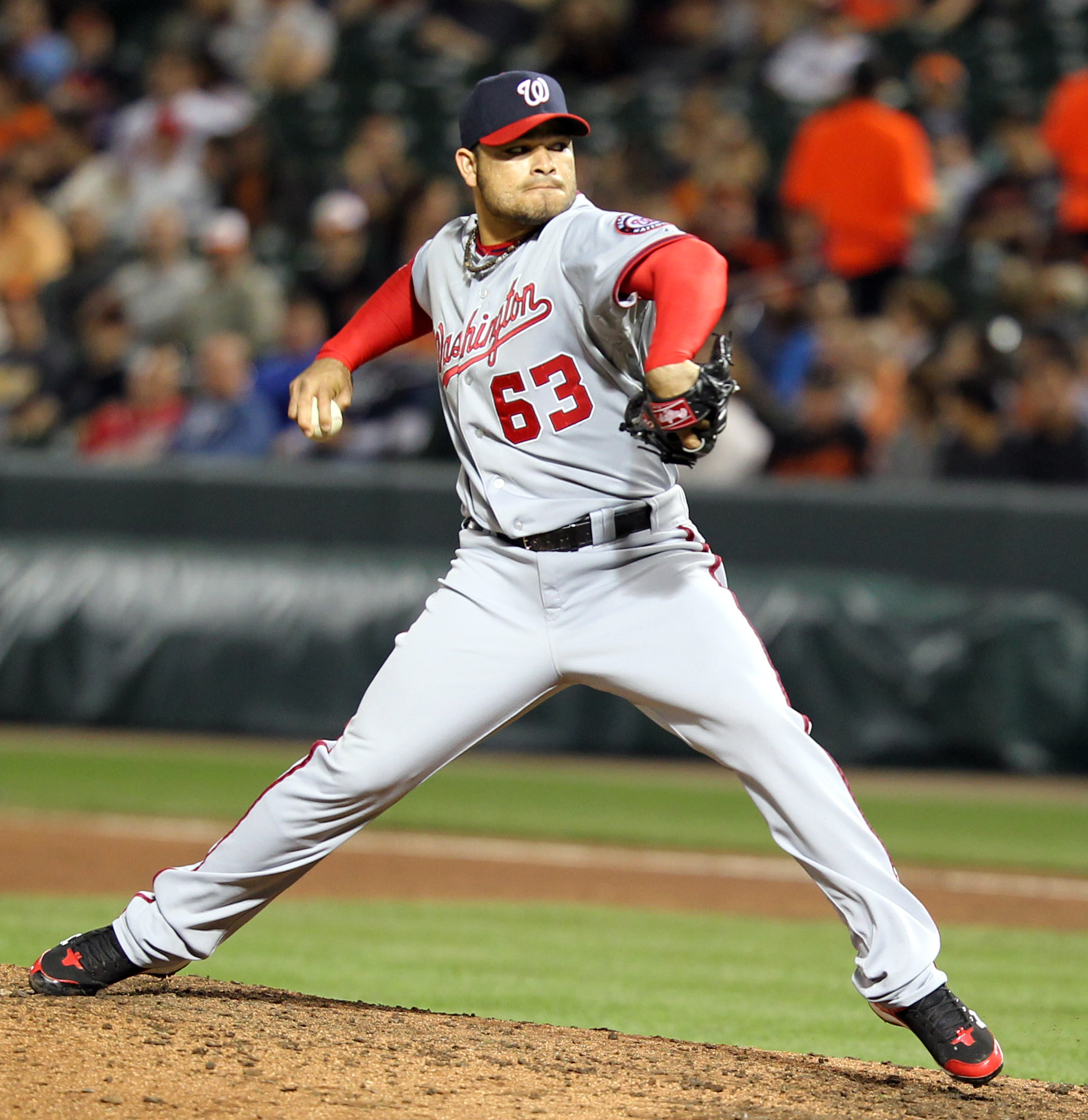
- Rodríguez with the Washington Nationals
- Relief pitcher
- Born: February 25, 1987 (age 39); Zulia, Venezuela
- Batted: Right Threw: Right

MLB debut
- September 21, 2009, for the Oakland Athletics

Last MLB appearance
- May 12, 2014, for the Miami Marlins

MLB statistics
- Win–loss record: 5–7
- Earned run average: 4.31
- Strikeouts: 151
- Stats at Baseball Reference

Teams
- Oakland Athletics (2009–2010); Washington Nationals (2011–2013); Chicago Cubs (2013); Miami Marlins (2014)

Henry Alberto Rodríguez (born February 25, 1987) is a Venezuelan former professional baseball pitcher. He played in Major League Baseball (MLB) for the Oakland Athletics, Washington Nationals, Chicago Cubs and Miami Marlins.

== Professional career ==
=== Oakland Athletics ===
Rodríguez began his professional career in 2006, with the Arizona League Athletics. With them, he went 5–2 with a 7.42 ERA in 15 games (four starts), striking out 59 batters in 43 2/3 innings of work.

In 2007, he went 6–8 with a 3.07 ERA in 20 games (18 starts), striking out 106 batters in 99 2/3 innings for the Kane County Cougars. He split the 2008 season between the Stockton Ports and the Midland RockHounds, finishing with a 4–10 record and a 5.20 ERA in 34 games (22 starts), while striking out 147 batters in 116 innings of work.

Rodríguez made his major league debut in the 8th inning of the September 21, 2009 game against the Texas Rangers, where he gave up two runs (one earned) on one hit and one walk while striking out one.

=== Washington Nationals ===
On December 16, 2010, Rodríguez, along with outfielder Corey Brown, was traded to the Nationals in exchange for Josh Willingham. Rodríguez appeared in 59 games in the 2011 season and earned a 3–3 record with a 3.56 ERA and 70 strikeouts.

Rodríguez was given an opportunity to close games for the Nationals in 2012 with regular stopper Drew Storen on the disabled list, but bouts of wildness led manager Davey Johnson to move Rodríguez out of the role by the end of May. He continued as a reliever, and pitched in 35 games in 2012, finishing with a 1–3 record, a 5.83 ERA, and 9 saves.

After pitching in 17 games with a 4.00 ERA in 2013, Rodríguez was designated for assignment on June 4, 2013.

=== Chicago Cubs ===
On June 11, 2013, Rodríguez was traded to the Chicago Cubs in exchange for right handed pitcher Ian Dickson. He was designated for assignment on July 14, clearing a spot on the active roster for Cole Gillespie. In five games, he walked four over four innings, striking out one with a 4.50 ERA.

=== Miami Marlins ===
Rodríguez signed a minor league contract with the Miami Marlins on January 16, 2014. He was designated for assignment on May 14, 2014. Rodríguez made 17 appearances for the Triple-A New Orleans Zephyrs, compiling an 0-1 record and 4.26 ERA with 41 strikeouts and one save across 25 1/3 innings pitched. On June 12, the Marlins released Rodríguez.

=== Chicago White Sox ===
Rodríguez signed a minor league contract with the Chicago White Sox on June 13, 2014. He was released a month later after walking eight batters in less than two innings for the Triple-A Charlotte Knights.

=== Arizona Diamondbacks ===
Rodríguez signed a minor league contract with the Arizona Diamondbacks on January 22, 2015. He was released prior to the start of the regular season on March 31.

== Pitching style ==
Rodríguez is known for a hard four-seam fastball averaging 98 mph over the course of his career. It tends to sit between 96 and 100 mph, reaching as high as 103 mph. A 103.2 mph fastball which he threw on September 15, 2010, was the third-fastest pitch ever recorded by PITCHf/x at the time. His secondary pitch is a curveball (83-85 mph), and a seldom thrown changeup.

Rodríguez's prowess has been hampered by a high walk rate of 5.6 per 9 innings. He also led the National League in wild pitches in 2011, and is leading the league again in 2012 despite having thrown only 21 innings. In the 86 2/3 he has pitched since the beginning of the 2011 season, Rodríguez has thrown 23 wild pitches.

== See also ==
- List of Major League Baseball players from Venezuela
