= Corey Brown (baseball) =

American baseball player (born 1985)

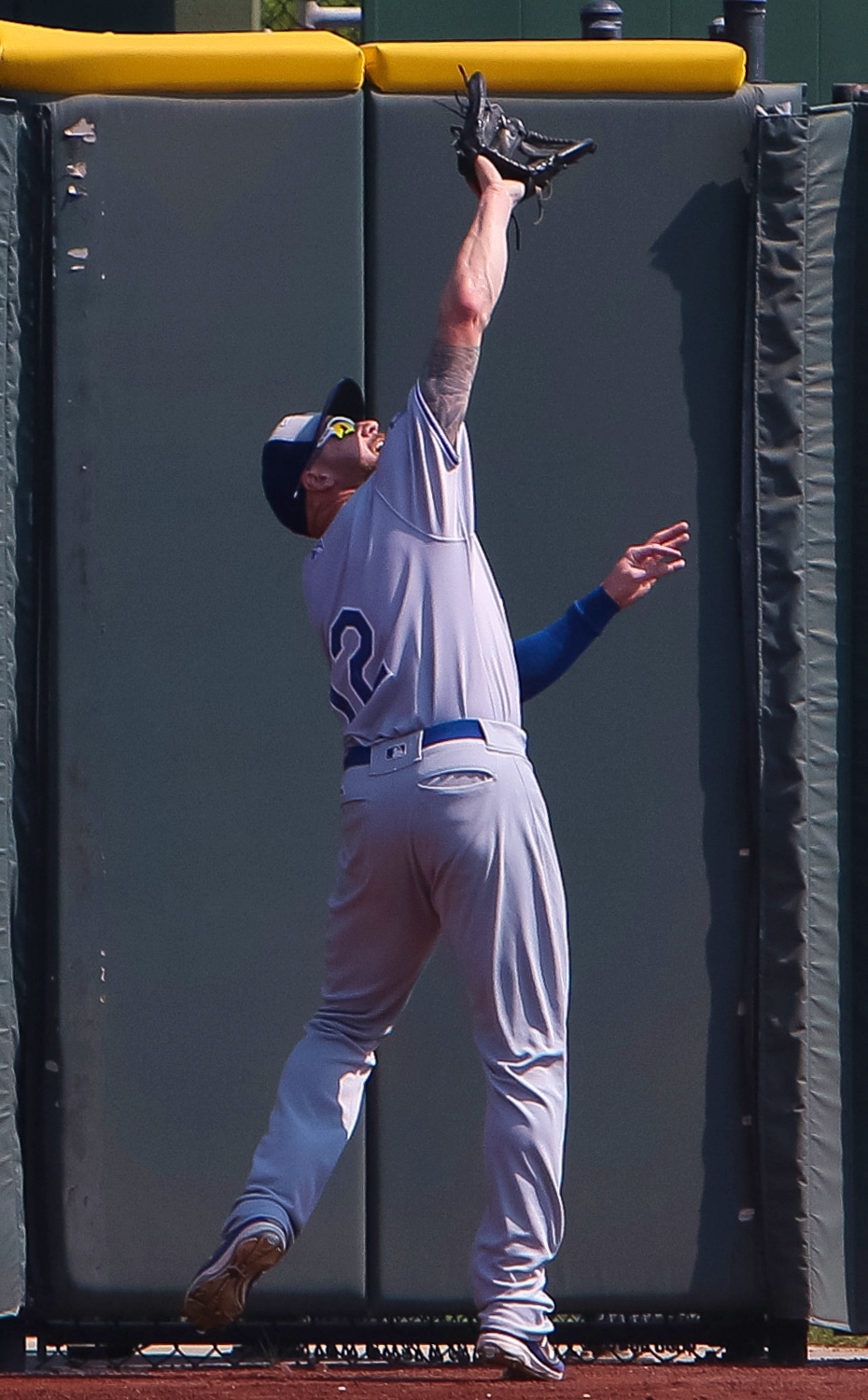
- Brown with the Oklahoma City Dodgers in 2016
- Center fielder
- Born: November 26, 1985 (age 40); Tampa, Florida, U.S.
- Batted: Left Threw: Left

MLB debut
- September 6, 2011, for the Washington Nationals

Last MLB appearance
- August 16, 2014, for the Boston Red Sox

MLB statistics
- Batting average: .171
- Home runs: 2
- Runs batted in: 4
- Stats at Baseball Reference

Teams
- Washington Nationals (2011–2013); Boston Red Sox (2014)

Corey Allan Brown (born November 26, 1985) is an American former professional baseball center fielder. He played in Major League Baseball (MLB) for the Washington Nationals and Boston Red Sox.

== Career ==
=== Amateur ===
Prior to playing professionally, Brown attended Plant High School and then Oklahoma State University. In his first year with Oklahoma State, in 2005, Brown hit .360 with 13 home runs and 46 RBI in 55 games. The following year, he hit .347 with 13 home runs and 40 RBI, stealing 14 bases. After the 2006 season, he played collegiate summer baseball with the Chatham A's of the Cape Cod Baseball League. Brown played his final season with Oklahoma State in 2007, hitting .335 with 22 home runs, 71 RBI and 23 stolen bases.

=== Oakland Athletics ===
He was drafted by the Oakland Athletics in the first round of the 2007 amateur draft and began his professional career that season.

Brown played for the Vancouver Canadians in 2007, hitting .268 with 11 home runs and 48 RBI in 59 games. In 2008, he played for both the Kane County Cougars (85 games, 14 home runs) and the Stockton Ports (49 games, 16 home runs), hitting a combined .266 with 30 home runs, 83 RBI and 16 stolen bases. In 2009, Brown spent his entire year with the Midland RockHounds, hitting .268 with nine home runs and 43 RBI. He split 2010 between the RockHounds and Sacramento River Cats, hitting a combined .283 with 15 home runs, 69 RBI and 22 stolen bases.

=== Washington Nationals ===
On December 16, 2010 Brown, with pitcher Henry Rodriguez were traded to the Washington Nationals in exchange for Josh Willingham.

Brown made his major league debut for the Washington Nationals on September 6, 2011, appearing in three games during the season, pinch-hitting three times, without getting on base. In 3 games during his rookie campaign, he went 0-for-3 with 2 strikeouts. On November 16, Brown was removed from the 40-man roster and sent outright to the Triple-A Syracuse Chiefs.

Brown's first major league hit was a home run, which he hit on July 28, 2012, against the Milwaukee Brewers in the fourth inning.

On December 12, 2013, Brown was designated for assignment by the Nationals after the signing of outfielder Nate McLouth.

=== Boston Red Sox ===
On December 19, 2013, the Nationals traded Brown to the Oakland Athletics in exchange for cash considerations. The Athletics designated Brown for assignment on January 22, 2014, when they signed Eric O'Flaherty.

Brown signed a minor league deal with the Boston Red Sox on January 31, 2014. On August 16, the Red Sox designated Brown for assignment, after he appeared in three games at the big league level with the club. He elected free agency in October 2014.

=== Tampa Bay Rays ===
On December 12, 2014, Brown signed a minor league contract with the Tampa Bay Rays. In 114 games for the Triple-A Durham Bulls, he batted .243/.317/.445 with 19 home runs, 60 RBI, and 15 stolen bases. Brown elected free agency following the season on November 6, 2015.

=== Los Angeles Dodgers ===
On January 13, 2016, Brown signed a minor league contract with the Los Angeles Dodgers organization. He was given a non–roster invitation to spring training and was assigned to the Triple–A Oklahoma City Dodgers to begin the year. With OKC, he played in 116 games and hit .249/.314/.493 with 23 home runs, 70 RBI, and 11 stolen bases. Brown elected free agency following the season on November 7.

=== Toros de Tijuana ===
On January 24, 2017, Brown signed with the Toros de Tijuana of the Mexican League. He was released on July 31, 2018.

=== Tigres de Quintana Roo ===
On August 3, 2018, Brown signed with the Tigres de Quintana Roo of the Mexican League. He became a free agent after the season.
