= Atahualpa Severino =

Dominican baseball player (born 1984)

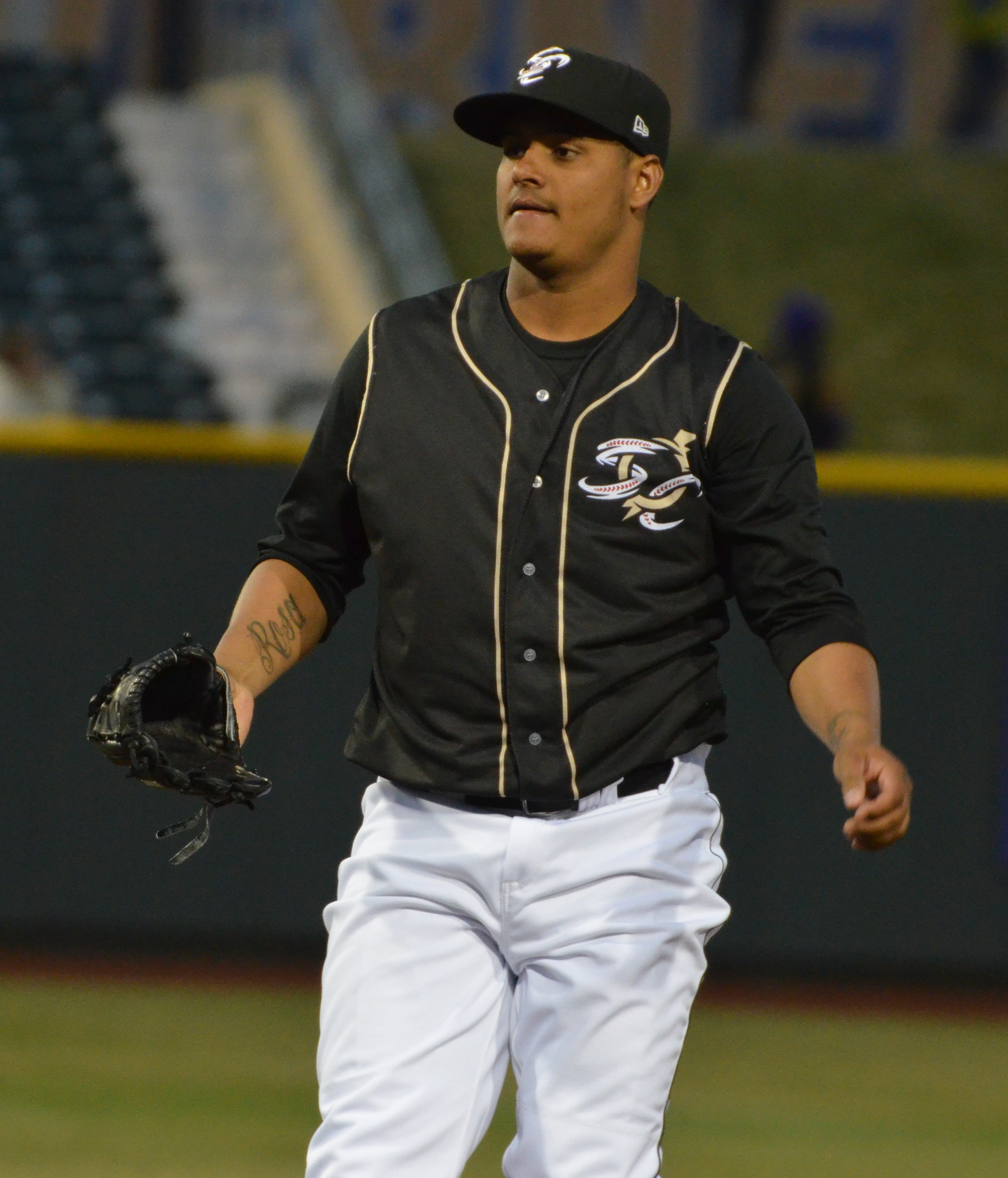
- Severino with the Omaha Storm Chasers in 2013
- Pitcher
- Born: November 6, 1984 (age 41); Cotuí, Dominican Republic
- Batted: Left Threw: Left

MLB debut
- September 6, 2011, for the Washington Nationals

Last MLB appearance
- September 26, 2011, for the Washington Nationals

MLB statistics
- Win–loss record: 1–0
- Earned run average: 3.86
- Strikeouts: 7
- Stats at Baseball Reference

Teams
- Washington Nationals (2011)
Medals
Men's baseball
Representing Dominican Republic
World Baseball Classic
Gold medal – first place	2013 San Francisco	Team

Atahualpa O. Severino (born November 6, 1984) is a Dominican former professional baseball pitcher. He played in Major League Baseball (MLB) with the Washington Nationals.

== Professional career ==
=== Washington Nationals ===
Severino began his professional career in 2006, pitching for the Dominican Summer Nationals. He appeared in 13 games, eight of which were starts, going 2-0 with a 0.99 ERA in 45 1/3 innings, striking out 69 batters.

In 2007, Severino pitched for the DSL Nationals (3-0, 0.48 ERA in 3 games started) and the rookie-level Gulf Coast League Nationals (1-0, 2.94 ERA in 13 games, five starts), going a combined 4-0 with a 2.06 ERA in 16 games (eight starts). He had 59 strikeouts in 52 1/3 innings.

Severino split the 2008 season between the Potomac Nationals (0-4, 3.96 ERA in 26 relief appearances) and the Hagerstown Suns (4-2, 4.05 ERA in 15 relief appearances), going a combined 4-6 with a 4.00 ERA in 41 relief appearances. He improved in 2009, as he split the season between Potomac (4-0, 2.54 ERA in 29 games) and the Double-A Harrisburg Senators (6-0, 2.78 ERA in 15 games), going a combined 10-0 with a 2.62 ERA in 44 relief appearances.

Severino appeared on the Major League roster with the Nationals for three days in 2010, but did not appear for the team, briefly becoming a phantom ballplayer. Severino made his Major League debut on September 6, 2011. He appeared as a reliever in 6 games in 2011, going 1-0 with a 3.86 ERA in 4 2/3 innings, striking out 7 and walking 1.

In 2012 Severino made 46 relief appearances for the Triple-A Syracuse Chiefs, posting a record of 3-0 with a 2.81 ERA and three saves. He was designated for assignment on August 6, 2012.

=== Kansas City Royals ===
On November 16, 2012 the Kansas City Royals announced they had signed Severino to a minor league contract for the 2013 season. No financial terms of the deal were announced.

=== Pittsburgh Pirates ===
Severino was traded to the Pittsburgh Pirates on May 30, 2013, in exchange for cash considerations.

=== Atlanta Braves ===
On December 18, 2013, Severino signed a minor league contract with the Atlanta Braves organization. He made 40 appearances for the Triple-A Gwinnett Braves in 2014, registering a 5-3 record and 3.22 ERA with 54 strikeouts and two saves across 44 2/3 innings pitched.

=== Los Angeles Angels ===
On December 4, 2014, Severino signed a minor league contract with the Los Angeles Angels. He played in 26 games for the Triple-A Salt Lake Bees in 2015, logging a 1-1 record and 8.44 ERA with 20 strikeouts across 26 2/3 innings pitched. Severino was released by the Angels organization on June 16, 2015.

=== Sultanes de Monterrey ===
On July 14, 2015, Severino signed with the Sultanes de Monterrey of the Mexican League. He made 16 appearances for the Sultanes, compiling a 4.30 ERA with 17 strikeouts across 14 2/3 innings pitched. Severino was released by the team on February 18, 2016.

On April 1, 2016, Severino re-signed with the Sultanes. In 59 appearances out of the bullpen, he compiled a 3-2 record and 2.70 ERA with 46 strikeouts across 46 2/3 innings pitched. Severino became a free agent after the season.

=== Diablos Rojos del México ===
On December 7, 2017, Severino signed with the Diablos Rojos del México of the Mexican League. In eight appearances for México, he recorded a 3.60 ERA with six strikeouts over five innings of work. Severino was released by the Diablos on April 8, 2018.

=== Sultanes de Monterrey (second stint) ===
On April 13, 2018, Severino signed with the Sultanes de Monterrey of the Mexican League.

=== Tigres de Quintana Roo ===
On June 17, 2018, Severino was traded to the Tigres de Quintana Roo of the Mexican League. In seven appearances for Quintana Roo, he struggled to an 0-2 record and 13.50 ERA with nine strikeouts across 4 2/3 innings pitched. Severino was released by the Tigres on July 27.

== International career ==
He was selected Dominican Republic national baseball team at 2013 World Baseball Classic and 2019 Pan American Games Qualifier.
