= John Lannan =

American baseball player and coach (born 1984)

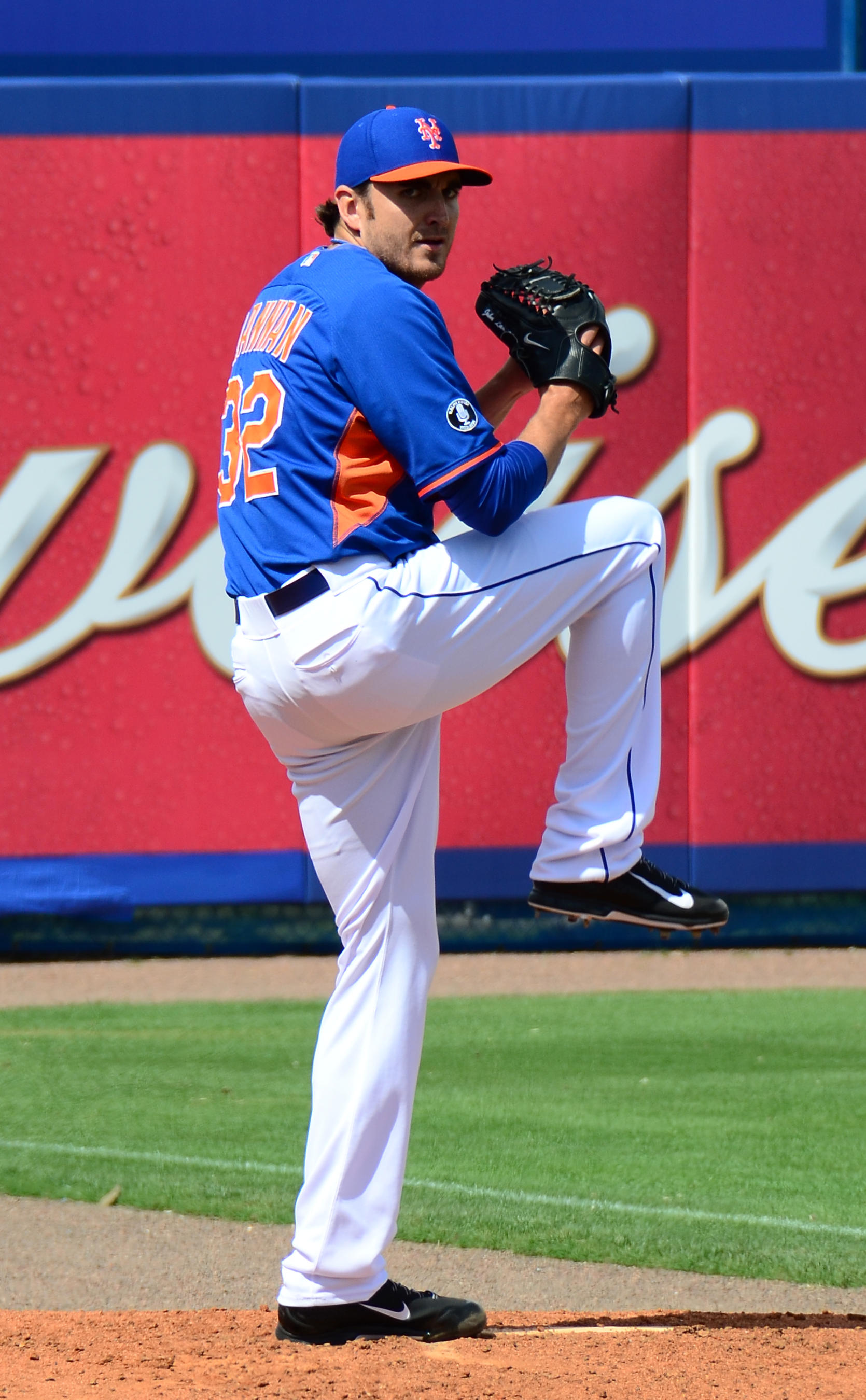
- Lannan with the New York Mets
- Pitcher
- Born: September 27, 1984 (age 42); Long Beach, New York, U.S.
- Batted: Left Threw: Left

MLB debut
- July 26, 2007, for the Washington Nationals

Last appearance
- April 13, 2014, for the New York Mets

MLB statistics
- Win–loss record: 46–58
- Earned run average: 4.18
- Strikeouts: 450
- Stats at Baseball Reference

Teams
- As player: Washington Nationals (2007–2012); Philadelphia Phillies (2013); New York Mets (2014); As coach: Toronto Blue Jays (2024–2026)

John Edward Lannan (born September 27, 1984) is an American former professional baseball pitcher who most recently served as the Major League mental performance coach for the Toronto Blue Jays from 2024 to 2026. He played in Major League Baseball (MLB) for the Washington Nationals and Philadelphia Phillies.

Lannan made his MLB debut with the Washington Nationals in 2007 against the Philadelphia Phillies; he was ejected from his first MLB game. He pitched with the Nationals for six seasons through 2012 and was the opening day starter in 2009 and 2010. He was relegated out of the rotation in 2012, and was eventually non-tendered making him a free agent. In December 2012, he signed with the division rival Phillies, with whom he was the fifth starter during the 2013 season. He played with the New York Mets in 2014.

== Early life ==
Lannan was born in Long Beach, New York. Following his time as captain of the baseball team at Chaminade High School in Mineola, New York, Lannan pitched for the Siena Saints of Siena College. He was selected by the Washington Nationals in the 11th round (324th overall) of the 2005 Major League Baseball draft.

== Minor leagues ==
He pitched for the low Single-A Vermont Expos in 2005 and the Single-A Savannah Sand Gnats in 2006, compiling earned run averages of 5.26 and 4.76 respectively. In 2007, however, he blazed through the minors. He began the year for the high-A Potomac Nationals going 6–0 with an earned run average of 2.13 and was promoted to the Double-A Harrisburg. He went 3–2 with a 3.25 earned run average and got promoted to Triple-A Columbus, where he started six games, and went 3–1 with a 1.75 earned run average. In July 2007, he was called up to the MLB team following his impressive numbers.

== MLB career ==
=== Washington Nationals ===
The Nationals, decimated by injuries to their starting pitchers, purchased his contract on July 26, 2007, for Lannan to start against the Philadelphia Phillies. In his debut, behind 3–2 with one out in the fifth inning, Lannan hit Chase Utley with a fastball (breaking Utley's hand) and then hit Ryan Howard on the next pitch, whereupon umpire Hunter Wendelstedt immediately ejected Lannan from the game; Lannan was the first Major Leaguer since Aaron Boone in 1997 to be tossed from his debut. The next would be former Astros pitcher Kyle Weiland who was ejected in his debut with the Boston Red Sox in 2011. Lannan picked up his first Major League win, in his second start, six days later, in which he held the Cincinnati Reds hitless through three and scoreless through five inning before allowing two runs in the sixth.

On August 6, 2007, in just his third major league start, found himself on the national stage as he faced the San Francisco Giants at AT&T Park in Barry Bonds's first start after tying Hank Aaron's Major League Baseball's home run record. The 22-year-old Lannan held Bonds to no hits; in four plate appearances Bonds fouled out to third, walked, grounded into a double play, and, as Lannan's last batter, struck out on a 3–2 curveball with two out and one on in the seventh. Lannan finished with seven innings of one-run ball pitched, although the Nats went on to lose 3–2 in 11 innings.

He ended the year with a 2–2 record and an earned run average of 4.15 in six starts, becoming one of the Nationals best starters. Over the next two years, he pitched more than 385 total innings with an earned run average under 3.90. Only 22 other pitchers did that, earning him the starter position for opening day in 2009 and 2010.

Lannan threw his first complete game on June 6, 2009, a 7–1 win over the New York Mets, and a month and a half later threw his first complete game shutout on July 21, 2009, a 4–0 shutout of the Mets. The 2009 season saw Lannan pitch to a 3.88 earned run average with a 9–13 record and 89 strikeouts through 206.1 innings.

His 2010 season started off poorly, allowing seven hits, three walks, and five runs in only 3 2/3 innings against the Philadelphia Phillies on Opening Day. After a stretch of two weeks in June, where in three games, he compiled a 10.38 earned run average while allowing 38 base runners in 13 innings, on June 21, 2010, Lannan was optioned to the class AA Harrisburg Senators. He was sent to AA rather than AAA because he had previously worked well with Harrisburg pitching coach Randy Tomlin. He had gone 2–5 with a 5.76 earned run average in 14 start before being sent down. In the minors, he compiled a 4.20 earned run average in 7 games started with 28 strikeouts and a 1–4 record. The Nationals later recalled Lannan in August to take the place of the injured Stephen Strasburg (who later had Tommy John surgery). He finished the season with a total of 143.1 IP, an 8–8 record, a 4.65 earned run average, and 71 strikeouts in 25 games started.

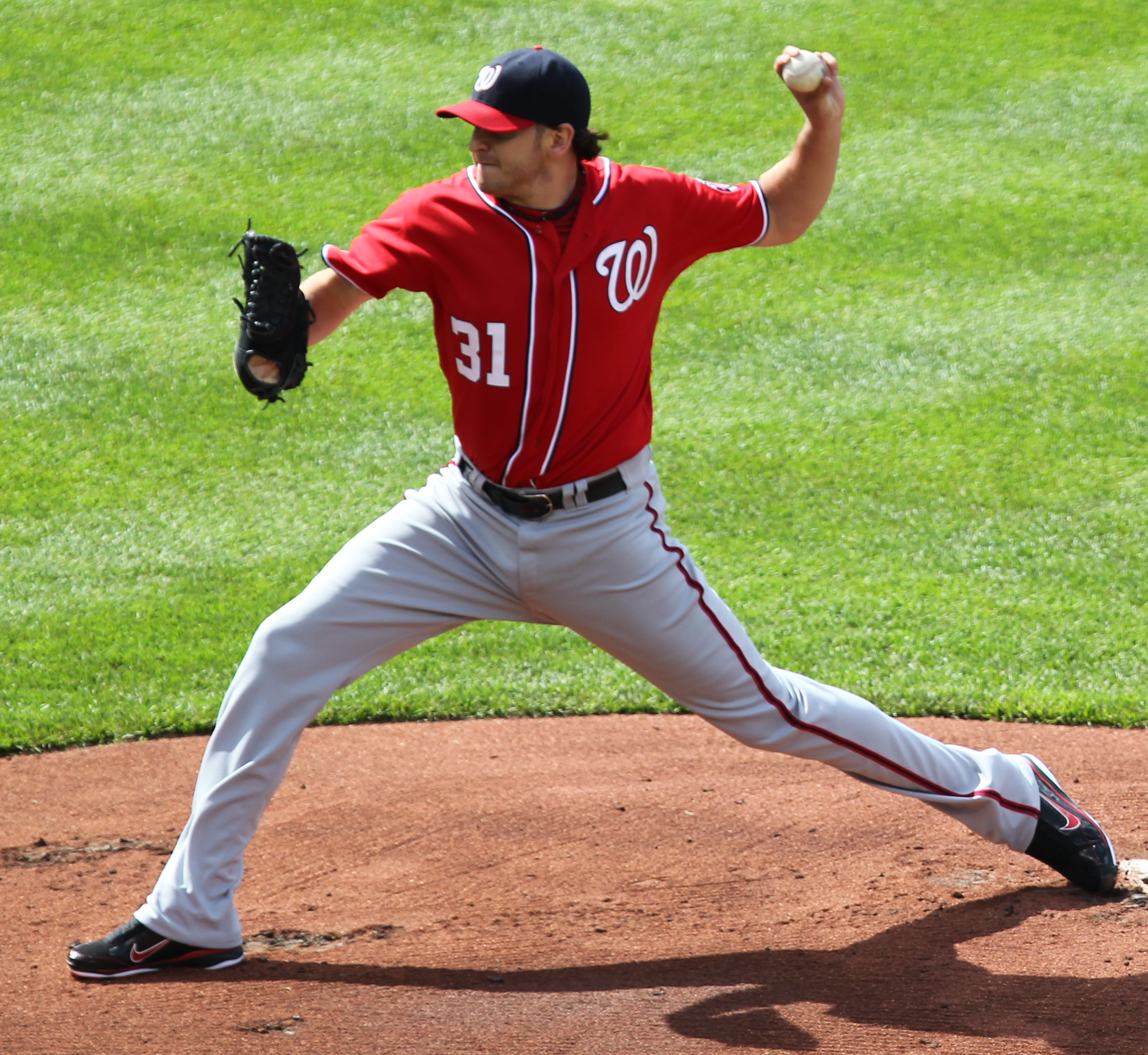
Lannan pitching for the Washington Nationals in 2011

On July 22, 2011, Lannan hit his first career home run off Hiroki Kuroda of the Los Angeles Dodgers. It was a two-run home run, giving the Nationals a 3–0 lead, en route to a 7–2 win at Dodger Stadium. The southpaw pitched to a 3.70 earned run average in 33 starts (184 2/3 innings pitched) plus 106 strikeouts, and a 10–13 record.

Lannan failed to earn a spot in the Nationals' 2012 starting rotation, losing the competition for the fifth slot to Ross Detwiler, and was optioned to AAA Syracuse to start the season. Lannan requested a trade to depart from the Washington Nationals. He was called up to the Nationals on July 21 to start against the Atlanta Braves. Lannan made a minor change in his mechanics in AAA, resulting in a sharper downward angle on his throwing motion. The tweak appeared to have a positive effect, as Lannan's last two starts in the minors were complete-game shutouts.

Lannan was called up again as part of the Nationals' 2012 September call-ups, filling the starting rotation job of Stephen Strasburg after Strasburg was shut down in early September. From September 12 through October 1, Lannan accrued a 4.58 earned run average in 19 2/3 innings over four starts, striking out 10 batters and allowing 24 hits, 7 bases on balls and 10 earned runs. He did not pitch in the 2012 postseason. At AAA, he tossed three complete games (two shutouts) over 24 starts with a 9–11 record, 86 strikeouts, and a 4.30 earned run average. In total, he started just six games (32 2/3 innings pitched) for Washington, resulting in a 4–1 record in addition to 17 strikeouts and a 4.13 earned run average.

On November 30, 2012, Lannan was non-tendered by the Nationals, making him an unrestricted free-agent.

=== Philadelphia Phillies ===
On December 18, 2012, Lannan signed a one-year, $2.5 million contract with the Philadelphia Phillies that included up to an additional $2.5 million in performance bonuses. Lannan initially was hesitant to sign with the Phillies, but after chatting with former Nationals' teammate Laynce Nix, who was with the Phillies, he was excited to sign. Phillies general manager Rubén Amaro, Jr. commented,

He is a solid veteran who has always been a strike thrower ... it is very important to have as much starting pitching depth as possible. I think this year John has provided that.

Lannan was happy to sign with a northeast team due to their hard-nosed mentality, but previously, he had a "unique" history with the Phillies including being ejected in his major league debut, which he made at Citizens Bank Park, during which he hit Chase Utley and Ryan Howard in consecutive at bats. In starts against the Phillies after that incident, he had a career record of 3 wins, 13 losses and a 5.53 earned run average. He made the Phillies rotation out of spring training as the fifth starter, and pitched reliably for the Phillies including one stretch in July during which he allowed only one earned run in 16 innings pitched.

During his 14th start of the season, Lannan exited in the second inning with a left knee injury. Later, he was placed on the 15-day disabled list due to tendinosis in his left knee. At that point in the season, he had a three win, six loss season with an earned run average of 5.33. On August 20, 2013, the Phillies announced that Lannan would miss the remainder of the season with what their assistant general manager Scott Proefrock called a "ruptured tendon", which the team physician said would require surgery.

In October 2013, the Phillies outrighted Lannan, which he refused, making him a free agent.

=== New York Mets ===
On January 18, 2014, the Mets signed Lannan to a minor league contract, with an invitation to major league spring training. Out of camp, he earned a job in the bullpen. However, he was subsequently outrighted off the roster when Daisuke Matsuzaka was called up from the minor leagues. Lannan elected free agency in October 2014.

=== Colorado Rockies ===
On November 18, 2014, the Colorado Rockies signed Lannan to a minor league contract that included an invitation to spring training.

=== Kansas City Royals ===
On December 14, 2015, Lannan signed a minor league contract with the Kansas City Royals. He made 25 appearances (19 starts) for the Triple–A Omaha Storm Chasers in 2016, compiling a 7–8 record and 5.24 ERA with 55 strikeouts across 132 1/3 innings pitched. Lannan elected free agency following the season on November 7, 2016.

=== Washington Nationals (second stint) ===
On February 27, 2017, Lannan signed a minor league deal with the Washington Nationals. He was released on June 8.

=== Long Island Ducks ===
On June 19, 2017, Lannan signed with the Long Island Ducks of the Atlantic League of Professional Baseball. He announced his retirement on August 13, 2017.

== Coaching career ==
On March 8, 2021, Lannan was announced as the mental performance coach for the Buffalo Bisons, the Triple-A affiliate of the Toronto Blue Jays.

On January 12, 2024, Lannan was promoted to the major league coaching staff when he was announced as the Major League mental performance coach for the team. On November 10, 2026, the Blue Jays announced that Lannan would not return for the 2027 season.

== Pitching style ==
Lannan threw five pitches, the primary one being a two-seam fastball at 89–91 mph. He also threw a four-seam fastball (88–91), a slider (79–83), a curveball (74–77), and a changeup (84–88). His repertoire against left-handed hitters consisted mostly of fastballs and sliders, while he added the changeup against right-handers. He relied most heavily on his slider in two-strike counts.
