= Josh Willingham =

American baseball player (born 1979)

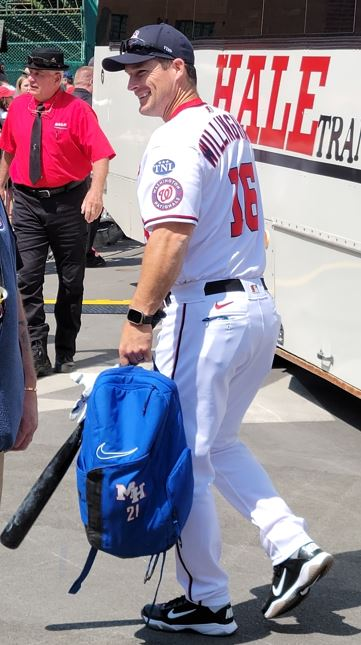
- Willingham in 2023
- Left fielder
- Born: February 17, 1979 (age 47); Florence, Alabama, U.S.
- Batted: Right Threw: Right

MLB debut
- July 6, 2004, for the Florida Marlins

Last MLB appearance
- September 28, 2014, for the Kansas City Royals

MLB statistics
- Batting average: .253
- Home runs: 195
- Runs batted in: 632
- Stats at Baseball Reference

Teams
- Florida Marlins (2004–2008); Washington Nationals (2009–2010); Oakland Athletics (2011); Minnesota Twins (2012–2014); Kansas City Royals (2014)

Career highlights and awards
- Silver Slugger Award (2012)

Joshua David Willingham (born February 17, 1979) is an American former professional baseball left fielder. He played in Major League Baseball (MLB) for the Florida Marlins, Washington Nationals, Oakland Athletics, Minnesota Twins, and Kansas City Royals.

== Early years ==
He was born in Florence, Alabama to David and Denise Willingham where he played high school baseball and basketball at Mars Hill Bible School. Willingham attended college at the University of North Alabama. He played shortstop and was a two-time All-Gulf South Conference selection (1999, 2000) and a 2-time American Baseball Coaches Association All American. He is a member of Sigma Chi fraternity, Eta Rho Chapter.

In both 1998 and 1999, he played summer league baseball for the Southern Minny Stars of the Northwoods League.

== Professional career ==
=== Florida Marlins ===
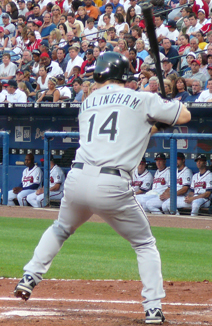
Willingham batting for the Marlins in June 2007

The Florida Marlins selected Willingham in the 17th round, with the 491st overall selection, of the 2000 Major League Baseball draft. He made his MLB debut on July 6, 2004, against the Pittsburgh Pirates but did not garner regular playing time until 2006.

After struggling to find a fielding position for Willingham, as his advanced hitting abilities did not allow him the opportunity to develop defensively, the Marlins made Willingham their starting left-fielder during the 2006 season in wake of the Marlins's "market correction" in the 2005 offseason.

On April 4, 2006, Willingham recorded his first career multi-homer game, launching two against the Houston Astros. He ended the 2006 season with a solid line of .277/.356/.496 with 26 home runs and 74 runs batted in.

2007 proved to be another successful season for Willingham in his sophomore season. He maintained a solid batting average while hitting 21 home runs and 89 runs batted in. He became the team's regular left fielder in 2007, making just three errors in 223 total chances.

Willingham saw a reduced amount of playing time in 2008 due to a 50-game stint on the disabled list, appearing in just over 100 games as opposed to over 140 in the previous two years. His production suffered as his batting average regressed (.258) and his home run totals dipped to 15 on the season. He homered in 4 straight games for first time in career, September 21–26.

=== Washington Nationals ===
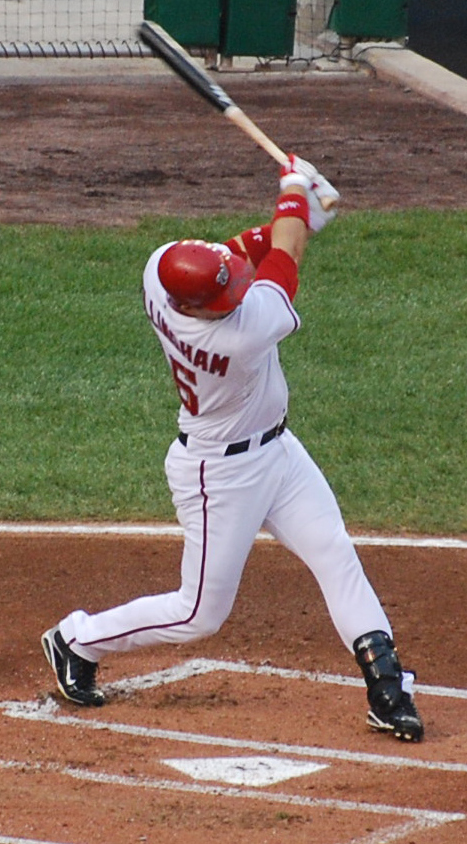
Willingham with the Nationals in 2009

On November 11, 2008, Willingham was traded to the Washington Nationals, along with pitcher Scott Olsen for Emilio Bonifacio, Jake Smolinski, and P.J. Dean. Willingham began 2009 as the Nationals' fifth outfielder behind Adam Dunn, Elijah Dukes, Austin Kearns, and Lastings Milledge. In May, however, Kearns was sidelined with a fractured foot, giving Willingham a starting role. Dunn was eventually moved to first base and Milledge was traded for then-Pittsburgh Pirates outfielder Nyjer Morgan. Willingham was very productive, proving himself worthy of the everyday left fielder position. On July 27, 2009, Willingham became the 13th player in MLB history to hit two grand slams in the same game and the 7th in MLB history to accomplish this feat in back to back innings. He ended the season with a line of .260/.367/.496 with 24 home runs and 61 RBIs. Having secured the starting left field job, Willingham was productive in the Nationals lineup in 2010. He batted 5th behind sluggers Ryan Zimmerman and Adam Dunn.

=== Oakland Athletics ===
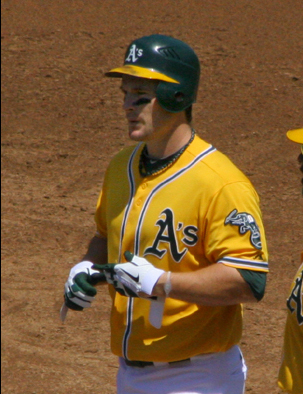
Willingham with the A's in 2011

On December 16, 2010, Willingham was traded to the Oakland Athletics for pitcher Henry Rodríguez and outfielder Corey Brown. His 2011 batting average of .246 was his lowest since his rookie season, but he reached career pinnacles in home runs (29) and RBIs (98). Willingham won the 2011 Catfish Hunter Award.

=== Minnesota Twins ===
On December 15, 2011, Willingham signed a 3-year deal with the Minnesota Twins worth $21 million.

Willingham was named AL Player of the Week for the week of April 9–15. Willingham hit 10-22 with 3 HR in 3 consecutive games and 4 RBI, getting a hit in every single game. Willingham singled in the 9th inning of a game on April 21, 2012 to tie Kirby Puckett's franchise record of getting a hit in the first 15 games of the season. On May 29, Willingham hit a two-out, three-run, walk-off HR against the Athletics. By mid-June, Willingham had hit 14 home runs before finishing the season with a career high 35 Willingham's home run total tied him with Bob Allison's 35 home runs in 1963 for the most by a Minnesota Twin (following their move in 1961) not named Harmon Killebrew.

=== Kansas City Royals ===
On August 11, 2014, Willingham was traded to the Kansas City Royals for RHP Jason Adam. In September, he announced that the 2014 season would be his last. He hit a bloop single in the 2014 American League Wild Card Game and was taken out for pinch runner Jarrod Dyson. That would turn out to be the game-tying run that would send the game to extra innings.

Willingham officially announced his retirement on November 24, 2014.

== Personal ==
Willingham is married to his high school sweetheart, Ginger Jaynes Willingham. They have three sons: Rhett, Ryder, and Rogan. Josh and Ginger started a charitable foundation and fundraising golf tournament named in honor of his younger brother, Jon Willingham, who died in a car accident in 2009.

On June 9, 2021, Willingham was announced as the head coach at his high school alma mater, Mars Hill Bible School in Florence, AL.
