= Brian Broderick =

American baseball player (born 1986)

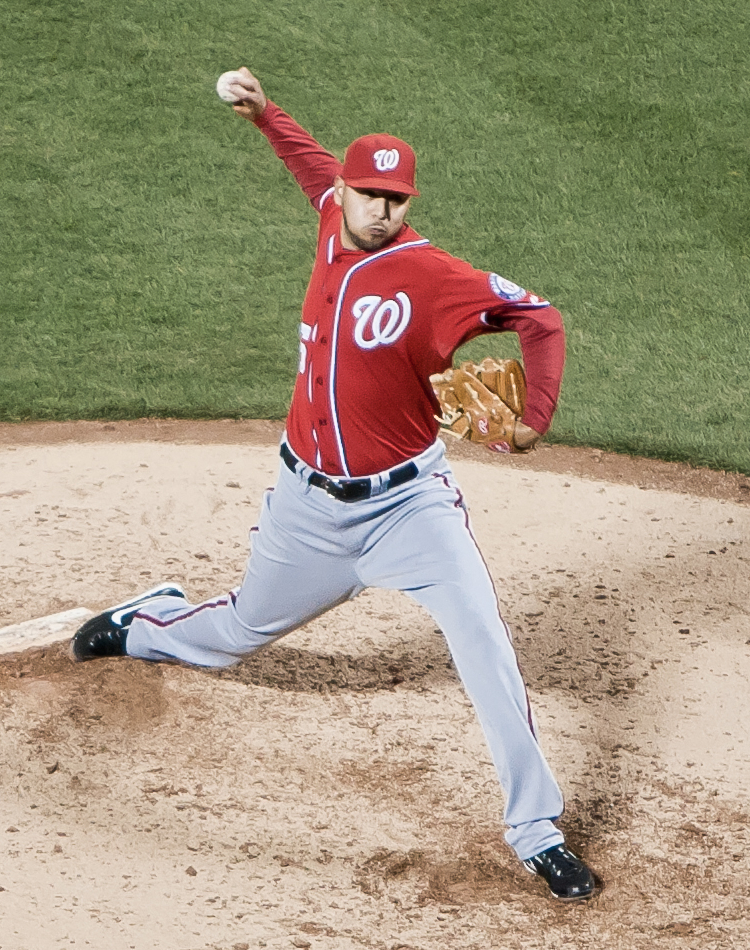
- Broderick with the Washington Nationals
- Pitcher
- Born: September 1, 1986 (age 39); Phoenix, Arizona
- Batted: Right Threw: Right

MLB debut
- April 3, 2011, for the Washington Nationals

Last appearance
- May 13, 2011, for the Washington Nationals

MLB statistics
- Win–loss record: 0–0
- Earned run average: 6.57
- Strikeouts: 4
- Stats at Baseball Reference

Teams
- Washington Nationals (2011)

Brian Michael Broderick (born September 1, 1986) is an American former professional baseball pitcher. He played in Major League Baseball (MLB) for the Washington Nationals.

== Career ==
=== St. Louis Cardinals ===
Broderick graduated from Washington (Arizona) High School in 2005. He attended Mesa Community College and posted a 7 - 2 record with a 2.51 ERA in 2006. Broderick attended Grand Canyon University the next year, posting a 6 - 5 record in a 3.65 ERA in 14 starts during the 2007 season. Broderick was drafted by the St. Louis Cardinals in the 21st round of the 2007 Major League Baseball draft.

=== Washington Nationals ===
He was selected by the Washington Nationals in the Rule 5 draft before the 2011 season. However, he was designated for assignment on May 14.

=== Second Stint with Cardinals ===
He was returned to the Cardinals on May 23.

On July 21, 2012, the Cardinals announced they had released Broderick from Triple-A.

=== Second Stint with Nationals ===
He signed a minor league contract with the Nationals on July 23, and was assigned to the Double-A Harrisburg Senators.

=== Arizona Diamondbacks ===
Broderick signed a minor league deal with the Arizona Diamondbacks on January 31, 2014.

=== Sugar Land Skeeters ===
Broderick pitched for the Sugar Land Skeeters of the independent Atlantic League of Professional Baseball in 2014. In 60 games 62.1 innings of relief he went 0-2 with a 2.31 ERA with 65 strikeouts and 11 saves.

=== Kansas City Royals ===
On November 23, 2014, Broderick signed a minor league contract with the Los Angeles Angels of Anaheim. The Angels traded Broderick to the Kansas City Royals in exchange for Johnny Giavotella on December 19, 2014. Broderick spent the 2015 season with the Triple-A Omaha Storm Chasers, making 42 appearances and working to a 5-4 record and 2.90 ERA with 38 strikeouts and 2 saves in 62.0 innings pitched. He elected free agency following the season on November 6, 2015.

== See also ==
- Rule 5 draft results
