= 2011 Philadelphia Phillies season =

Major League Baseball season

2011 Philadelphia Phillies
- National League East champions
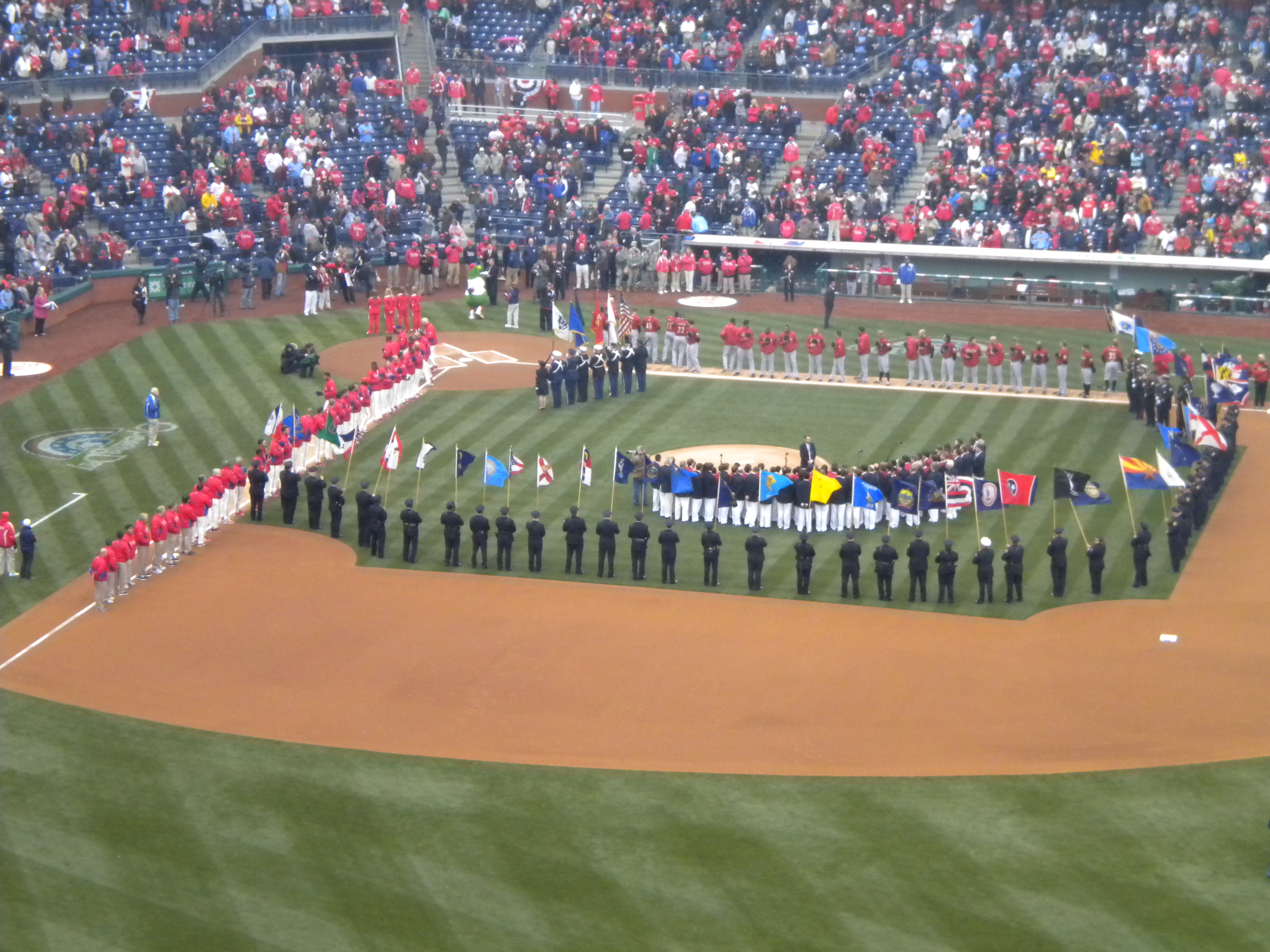
- The 2011 Phillies on the field at Citizens Bank Park on Opening Day
- League: National League
- Division: East
- Ballpark: Citizens Bank Park
- City: Philadelphia, Pennsylvania
- Record: 102–60 (.630)
- Divisional place: 1st
- Owners: Bill Giles, David Montgomery, et al.
- General managers: Rubén Amaro, Jr.
- Managers: Charlie Manuel
- Television: Comcast SportsNet Philadelphia; Comcast Network Philadelphia; WPHL-TV (My PHL 17) (Tom McCarthy, Chris Wheeler, Gary Matthews)
- Radio: Phillies Radio Network; 94.1 FM - WPHT (English) (Scott Franzke, Larry Andersen, Jim Jackson); Rumba 1480 AM (Spanish) (Danny Martinez, Bill Kulik, Rickie Ricardo)

The Philadelphia Phillies' 2011 season was the 129th season in the history of the franchise. The Phillies won their fifth consecutive National League East championship, and also finished with the best record in baseball for the second straight year. The Phillies, at 3–1 odds, were the heavy-favorite to win the World Series. However, they were eliminated in the NLDS in five games by the eventual World Series champion St. Louis Cardinals. This was the last season that the Phillies made the postseason until 2022, making it the longest active postseason drought in the National League at the time. The 2011 Phillies were the last team until the 2015 Cardinals to finish the season with at least 100 wins.

The Phillies had three pitchers with 6.0 or more Baseball Reference pitching wins above replacement, tying the record for the most such pitchers in a season. The other teams to accomplish this were the 1891 Boston Beaneaters, 1913 Chicago White Sox, 1925 Cincinnati Reds, and 2017 Washington Nationals.

== Offseason ==
The offseason for the Phillies began on October 23, 2010, when they lost the National League Championship Series to the San Francisco Giants. Although all coaches were invited to return for the 2011 season, first-base coach Davey Lopes informed the team that he would be leaving because of a salary dispute. To replace him, third-base coach Sam Perlozzo was moved to first base, and former Phillies second baseman and Orioles' third-base coach and interim manager Juan Samuel was hired to take over at third base.

On November 16, the Phillies signed reliever José Contreras to a two-year contract after he posted a 3.34 ERA in 2010. On December 6, right fielder Jayson Werth signed a seven-year contract with the Washington Nationals. On December 15, the Phillies re-signed Cliff Lee, the starting pitcher whom they had traded to the Seattle Mariners during the previous offseason in order to acquire Roy Halladay. With the addition of Lee, Halladay, Cole Hamels, and Roy Oswalt earned the nickname "The Four Aces".

== Regular season ==
=== April ===
The Phillies stormed out of the gate, sweeping the Houston Astros on opening weekend. Three out of the four aces won their first starts (Hamels lost against the Mets). José Contreras was said to be the new Phillies closer; however, he got injured in late April, and was replaced by Ryan Madson. Madson continued the year in the closer position. The Phillies finished April with an 18–8 record, the second best in the majors, trailing only the Cleveland Indians, a team whom they traded with throughout the month for the best record in the majors.

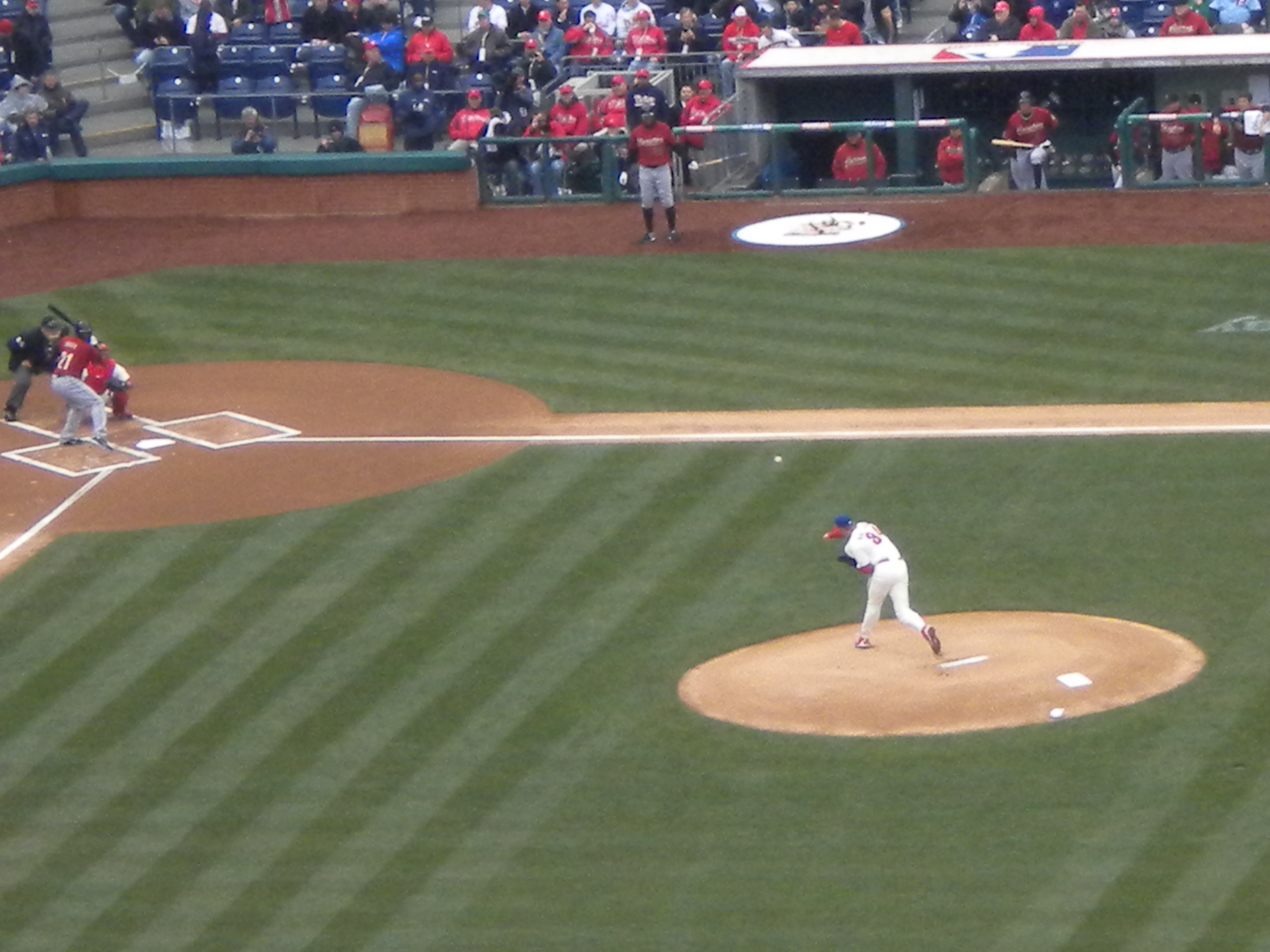
Roy Halladay throwing the first pitch of the 2011 season to the Astros' Michael Bourn on April 1

=== May ===
On May 9, the Phillies took sole possession of the best record in the majors, a position that they would hold for the rest of the regular season. May was their second-worst month record-wise (following September)—they did not have many winning or losing streaks. However, the Phillies' game against rival New York Mets on May 1 was an unforgettable one, although they lost 2–1 in 14 innings. The Mets' Daniel Murphy was batting as a pinch-hitter against Phillies' reliever Ryan Madson when the fans started chanting "U-S-A!" Later, it was determined that the chants were in response to the news that al-Qaeda leader Osama bin Laden, the mastermind of the September 11 attacks, had been killed by United States special operations forces in Abbottabad, Pakistan. Mike Lopresti of USA Today said that the Phillies' rivals "was a perfect fit" when the news broke. The Phillies finished May with a 34–22 record.

=== June ===
June was a very good month for the Phillies. In the middle of the month, they went on a seven-game winning streak, taking three of four from the Chicago Cubs, and a four-game sweep of the Florida Marlins. They came back to earth, trading several wins and losses over the next week. June concluded with the marquee match-up against the Boston Red Sox, a series many predicted to be a World Series preview (as it turned out, neither team made the Fall Classic). The Phillies dominated, taking two of three, highlighted by Cliff Lee's shutout performance in the first game of the series. Lee went 5–0 with a 0.21 ERA in June, which earned him NL Pitcher of the Month. In June, Lee had more RBIs than earned runs (2 RBIs and only 1 earned run). The Phillies finished June with a 52–31 record.

=== July ===
By the beginning of July, the Phillies were certainly living up to their preseason hype, and were looking to be a definite contender for the World Series. July was the best month for the Phillies; they compiled a 17–8 record, and were beginning to run away with the NL East. On July 11, the Phillies overtook the top spot on ESPN's Power Rankings, a spot they would hold for the remaining 12 weeks of the season. The Phillies sent five players (Roy Halladay, Cliff Lee, Cole Hamels, Plácido Polanco, and Shane Victorino) to the All Star Game. The Phillies finished July with a 69–39 record.

=== August ===
The Phillies began August riding a nine-game winning streak, and in time, extended their lead in the NL East to 8.5 games. After several months of being injured, Roy Oswalt came back into action in the Phillies, winning his first two starts by a combined score of 16–3. Because of Hurricane Irene, the Phillies had to play 33 games in 31 days, from August 29 to September 28. Along the way, they played three doubleheaders, the last of which came as a result of a rain-out in September. On August 31, the Phillies reached 40 games over .500—for the first time since their back-to-back 100+ win seasons in 1976 and 1977, in which they went 101–61—with a 3–0 win in Cincinnati against the Reds and improved to 86–46. Wins during the next two days got them to 42 games over .500 for the first time in franchise history.

=== September ===
On September 14, the Phillies became the first team to clinch a playoff spot with a 1–0 win in Houston, against Hunter Pence's former team, after acquiring him at the trade deadline. Three days later, they clinched the NL East title for the fifth consecutive season. With 102 wins, the Phillies had the best record in baseball for the second year in a row and broke the franchise record for most regular-season wins. Towards the end of the season, the Phillies had an eight-game losing streak, but even with this streak, they had already clinched the NL East, as well as the best record in the majors. The Phillies ended the season by sweeping the Braves, capped off by a 14-inning win in the last game of the season. By winning the final game of the regular season, Phillies Manager Charlie Manuel also became the manager with the most wins in Phillies history. The win by the Phillies also eliminated the Braves from postseason contention, and allowed the St. Louis Cardinals to play in the postseason.

The Phillies also led the major leagues in attendance for the first time, with 3,680,718 fans (a franchise record), an average of 45,440 per game.

=== Season standings ===
==== National League East ====
NL East
Team	W	L	Pct.	GB	Home	Road
Philadelphia Phillies	102	60	.630	—	52‍–‍29	50‍–‍31
Atlanta Braves	89	73	.549	13	47‍–‍34	42‍–‍39
Washington Nationals	80	81	.497	21½	44‍–‍36	36‍–‍45
New York Mets	77	85	.475	25	34‍–‍47	43‍–‍38
Florida Marlins	72	90	.444	30	31‍–‍47	41‍–‍43

==== National League Wild Card ====
Division leaders
Team	W	L	Pct.
Philadelphia Phillies	102	60	.630
Milwaukee Brewers	96	66	.593
Arizona Diamondbacks	94	68	.580

Wild Card team (Top team qualifies for postseason)
Team	W	L	Pct.	GB
St. Louis Cardinals	90	72	.556	—
Atlanta Braves	89	73	.549	1
San Francisco Giants	86	76	.531	4
Los Angeles Dodgers	82	79	.509	7½
Washington Nationals	80	81	.497	9½
Cincinnati Reds	79	83	.488	11
New York Mets	77	85	.475	13
Colorado Rockies	73	89	.451	17
Florida Marlins	72	90	.444	18
Pittsburgh Pirates	72	90	.444	18
Chicago Cubs	71	91	.438	19
San Diego Padres	71	91	.438	19
Houston Astros	56	106	.346	34

=== Record vs. opponents ===
§	National League East
†	National League Central
*	National League West

Team	Record
Arizona Diamondbacks*	3–3
Atlanta Braves^{§}	12–6
Chicago Cubs^{†}	5–2
Cincinnati Reds^{†}	7–1
Colorado Rockies*	4–1
Florida Marlins^{§}	12–6
Houston Astros^{†}	4–2
Los Angeles Dodgers*	5–1
Milwaukee Brewers^{†}	4–3
New York Mets^{§}	11–7
Pittsburgh Pirates^{†}	4–2
San Diego Padres*	7–1
San Francisco Giants*	4–3
St. Louis Cardinals^{†}	3–6
Washington Nationals^{§}	8–10
Interleague play	9–6

2011 National League record Source: MLB Standings Grid – 2011
Team	AZ	ATL	CHC	CIN	COL	FLA	HOU	LAD	MIL	NYM	PHI	PIT	SD	SF	STL	WSH	AL
Arizona	–	2–3	3–4	4–2	13–5	5–2	6–1	10–8	4–3	3–3	3–3	3–3	11–7	9–9	3–4	5–3	10–8
Atlanta	3–2	–	4–3	3–3	6–2	12–6	5–1	2–5	5–3	9–9	6–12	4–2	4–5	6–1	1–5	9–9	10–5
Chicago	4–3	3–4	–	7–11	2–4	3–3	8–7	3–3	6–10	4–2	2–5	8–8	3–3	5–4	5–10	3–4	5–10
Cincinnati	2–4	3–3	11–7	–	3–4	3–3	9–6	4–2	8–8	2–5	1–7	5–10	4–2	5–2	9–6	4–2	7–11
Colorado	5–13	2–6	4–2	4–3	–	3–3	5–2	9–9	3–6	5–2	1–4	4–3	9–9	5–13	2–4	4–3	8–7
Florida	2–5	6–12	3–3	3–3	3–3	–	6–1	3–3	0–7	9–9	6–12	6–0	0–7	4–2	2–6	11–7	8–10
Houston	1–6	1–5	7–8	6–9	2–5	1–6	–	4–5	3–12	3–3	2–4	7–11	3–5	4–3	5–10	3–3	4–11
Los Angeles	8–10	5–2	3–3	2–4	9–9	3–3	5–4	–	2–4	2–5	1–5	6–2	13–5	9–9	4–3	4–2	6–9
Milwaukee	3–4	3–5	10–6	8–8	6–3	7–0	12–3	4–2	–	4–2	3–4	12–3	3–2	3–3	9–9	3–3	6–9
New York	3–3	9–9	2–4	5–2	2–5	9–9	3–3	5–2	2–4	–	7–11	4–4	4–3	2–4	3–3	8–10	9–9
Philadelphia	3–3	12–6	5–2	7–1	4–1	12–6	4–2	5–1	4–3	11–7	–	4–2	7–1	4–3	3–6	8–10	9–6
Pittsburgh	3–3	2–4	8–8	10–5	3–4	0–6	11–7	2–6	3–12	4–4	2–4	–	2–4	3–3	7–9	4–4	8–7
San Diego	7–11	5–4	3–3	2–4	9–9	7–0	5–3	5–13	2–3	3–4	1–7	4–2	–	6–12	3–3	3–4	6–9
San Francisco	9–9	1–6	4–5	2–5	13–5	2–4	3–4	9–9	3–3	4–2	3–4	3–3	12–6	–	5–2	3–4	10–5
St. Louis	4–3	5–1	10–5	6–9	4–2	6–2	10–5	3–4	9–9	3–3	6–3	9–7	3–3	2–5	–	2–4	8–7
Washington	3–5	9–9	4–3	2–4	3–4	7–11	3–3	2–4	3–3	10–8	10–8	4–4	4–3	4–3	4–2	–	8–7

=== Game log ===
2011 game log
April (18–8) – home (9–4) – road (9–4)

#	Date	Opponent	Score	Win	Loss	Save	Attendance	Record
1	April 1	Astros	5–4	**Báez** (1–0)	Lyon (0–1)		45,237	1–0
2	April 2	Astros	9–4	**Lee** (1–0)	Rodríguez (0–1)		45,455	2–0
3	April 3	Astros	7–3	**Oswalt** (1–0)	Norris (0–1)		45,562	3–0
4	April 5	Mets	1–7	Young (1–0)	**Hamels** (0–1)		45,365	3–1
5	April 6	Mets	10–7	**Bastardo** (1–0)	Boyer (0–1)	**Contreras** (1)	45,061	4–1
6	April 7	Mets	11–0	**Halladay** (1–0)	Niese (0–1)		45,468	5–1
7	April 8	@ Braves	3–6	Hudson (2–0)	**Lee** (1–1)	Kimbrel (3)	51,331	5–2
8	April 9	@ Braves	10–2	**Oswalt** (2–0)	Beachy (0–1)		36,256	6–2
9	April 10	@ Braves	3–0	**Hamels** (1–1)	Lowe (2–1)	**Contreras** (2)	43,796	7–2
10	April 12	@ Nationals	4–7	Hernández (1–1)	**Blanton** (0–1)	Burnett (3)	13,413	7–3
11	April 13	@ Nationals	3–2	**Halladay** (2–0)	Lannan (1–1)		16,914	8–3
12	April 14	@ Nationals	4–0	**Lee** (2–1)	Zimmermann (1–2)		24,875	9–3
13	April 15	Marlins	3–4	Mujica (2–1)	**Báez** (1–1)	Núñez (5)	45,667	9–4
	April 16	Marlins	Postponed (rain); Makeup: June 15					
14	April 17	Marlins	3–2	**Madson** (1–0)	Webb (0–2)	**Contreras** (3)	45,716	10–4
15	April 18	Brewers	3–6 (12)	Kintzler (1–0)	**Kendrick** (0–1)		45,637	10–5
16	April 19	Brewers	0–9	Wolf (2–2)	**Halladay** (2–1)		45,408	10–6
17	April 20	Brewers	4–3	**Madson** (2–0)	Kintzler (1–1)	**Contreras** (4)	45,743	11–6
18	April 21	@ Padres	3–0	**Oswalt** (3–0)	Latos (0–3)	**Contreras** (5)	27,056	12–6
19	April 22	@ Padres	2–0	**Hamels** (2–1)	Richard (1–1)	**Madson** (1)	33,572	13–6
20	April 23	@ Padres	4–2 (11)	**Kendrick** (1–1)	Qualls (0–2)	**Madson** (2)	40,038	14–6
21	April 24	@ Padres	3–1	**Halladay** (3–1)	LeBlanc (0–1)	**Bastardo** (1)	24,031	15–6
22	April 25	@ Diamondbacks	0–4	Kennedy (3–1)	**Lee** (2–2)		19,586	15–7
23	April 26	@ Diamondbacks	5–7	Hudson (1–4)	**Oswalt** (3–1)		19,037	15–8
24	April 27	@ Diamondbacks	8–4	**Hamels** (3–1)	Saunders (0–3)		21,825	16–8
25	April 29	Mets	10–3	**Worley** (1–0)	Pelfrey (1–3)		45,613	17–8
26	April 30	Mets	2–1	**Halladay** (4–1)	Niese (1–4)		45,598	18–8

May (16–13) – home (10–6) – road (6–7)

#	Date	Opponent	Score	Win	Loss	Save	Attendance	Record
27	May 1	Mets	1–2	Buchholz (1–0)	**Kendrick** (1–2)		45,713	18–9
28	May 3	Nationals	4–1	**Hamels** (4–1)	Hernández (3–3)		45,695	19–9
29	May 4	Nationals	7–4	**Worley** (2–0)	Marquis (3–1)		44,123	20–9
30	May 5	Nationals	7–3	**Halladay** (5–1)	Lannan (2–4)		45,316	21–9
31	May 6	Braves	0–5	Lowe (3–3)	**Lee** (2–3)		45,495	21–10
32	May 7	Braves	3–0	**Kendrick** (2–2)	Teherán (0–1)	**Madson** (3)	45,609	22–10
33	May 8	Braves	2–5	Jurrjens (4–0)	**Hamels** (4–2)	Kimbrel (8)	45,619	22–11
34	May 9	@ Marlins	6–4	**Blanton** (1–1)	Vázquez (2–3)	**Madson** (4)	11,444	23–11
35	May 10	@ Marlins	1–2	Dunn (3–2)	**Halladay** (5–2)	Núñez (12)	21,955	23–12
36	May 11	@ Marlins	5–3	**Kendrick** (3–2)	Núñez (0–1)	**Madson** (5)	18.504	24–12
37	May 13	@ Braves	5–4	**Bastardo** (2–0)	Flaherty (1–2)	**Madson** (6)	36,168	25–12
38	May 14	@ Braves	3–5	Jurrjens (5–0)	**Blanton** (1–2)	Kimbrel (9)	35,238	25–13
39	May 15	@ Braves	2–3	Venters (5–3)	**Halladay** (5–3)	Kimbrel (10)	42,117	25–14
40	May 16	@ Cardinals	1–3	Westbrook (3–3)	**Lee** (2–4)	Salas (4)	34,884	25–15
41	May 17	@ Cardinals	1–2	Salas (2–0)	**Báez** (1–2)		34,567	25–16
42	May 18	Rockies	2–1	**Hamels** (5–3)	Rosa (5–2)	**Madson** (7)	44,665	26–16
43	May 19	Rockies	1–7	Chacín (5–2)	**Kendrick** (3–3)		45,425	26–17
44	May 20	Rangers	3–2	**Halladay** (6–3)	Wilson (4–3)	**Madson** (8)	45,358	27–17
45	May 21	Rangers	2–0	**Lee** (3–4)	Lewis (4–5)	**Madson** (9)	45,604	28–17
46	May 22	Rangers	0–2	Harrison (4–4)	**Oswalt** (3–2)	Feliz (9)	45,633	28–18
47	May 23	Reds	10–3	**Hamels** (6–2)	Arroyo (3–5)		45,841	29–18
48	May 24	Reds	3–6	Ondrusek (3–2)	**Madson** (2–1)	Cordero (9)	45,740	29–19
49	May 25	Reds	5–4 (19)	**Valdez** (1–0)	Fisher (0–1)		45,706	30–19
50	May 26	Reds	10–4	**Lee** (4–4)	Thompson (0–1)		45,650	31–19
51	May 27	@ Mets	6–4	**Bastardo** (3–0)	Rodríguez (1–1)	**Madson** (10)	33,882	32–19
52	May 28	@ Mets	5–2	**Hamels** (6–2)	O'Connor (0–1)	**Madson** (11)	29,337	33–19
53	May 29	@ Mets	5–9	Niese (4–5)	**Worley** (2–1)		30,791	33–20
54	May 30	@ Nationals	5–4	**Halladay** (7–3)	Burnett (0–2)	**Madson** (12)	34,789	34–20
55	May 31	@ Nationals	2–10	Marquis (6–2)	**Lee** (4–5)		21,017	34–21

June (17–10) – home (13–4) – road (4–6)

#	Date	Opponent	Score	Win	Loss	Save	Attendance	Record
56	June 1	@ Nationals	1–2	Lannan (3–5)	**Oswalt** (3–3)	Storen (10)	24,495	34–22
57	June 3	@ Pirates	1–2	Moskos (1–0)	**Báez** (1–3)		33,861	34–23
58	June 4	@ Pirates	3–6	Morton (6–2)	**Kendrick** (3–4)		39,441	34–24
59	June 5	@ Pirates	7–3	**Halladay** (8–3)	McDonald (3–4)		35,505	35–24
60	June 6	Dodgers	3–1	**Lee** (5–5)	Lilly (4–5)	**Madson** (13)	45,777	36–24
61	June 7	Dodgers	2–6	De La Rosa (2–0)	**Oswalt** (3–4)		44,721	36–25
62	June 8	Dodgers	2–0	**Hamels** (8–2)	Kuroda (5–7)	**Madson** (14)	44,751	37–25
63	June 9	Cubs	3–4	Marshall (3–0)	**Herndon** (0–1)	Mármol (12)	44,906	37–26
64	June 10	Cubs	7–5	**Halladay** (9–3)	Zambrano (5–3)	**Bastardo** (2)	45,602	38–26
65	June 11	Cubs	7–1	**Lee** (6–5)	Garza (2–6)		45,738	39–26
66	June 12	Cubs	4–3	**Oswalt** (4–4)	Marshall (3–1)	**Madson** (15)	45,361	40–26
67	June 14	Marlins	9–1	**Hamels** (9–2)	Volstad (2–7)		45,424	41–26
68	June 15	Marlins	8–1	**Kendrick** (4–4)	Villanueva (0–1)		44,758	42–26
69	June 15	Marlins	5–4 (10)	**Madson** (3–1)	Dunn (4–5)		45,880	43–26
70	June 16	Marlins	3–0	**Lee** (7–5)	Vasquez (3–7)		45,628	44–26
71	June 17	@ Mariners	2–4	Pineda (7–4)	**Oswalt** (4–5)	League (20)	34,345	44–27
72	June 18	@ Mariners	5–1	**Stutes** (1–0)	Hernández (7–6)		35,829	45–27
73	June 19	@ Mariners	0–2	Vargas (5–4)	**Hamels** (9–3)		45,462	45–28
74	June 21	@ Cardinals	10–2	**Stutes** (2–0)	Miller (0–1)		40,095	46–28
75	June 22	@ Cardinals	4–0	**Lee** (8–5)	Lohse (7–4)		36,520	47–28
76	June 23	@ Cardinals	2–12	Carpenter (2–7)	**Oswalt** (4–6)		40,532	47–29
77	June 24	Athletics	1–0	**Stutes** (3–0)	Fuentes (1–8)		45,685	48–29
78	June 25	Athletics	1–4	Cahill (8–5)	**Hamels** (9–4)	Bailey (5)	45,785	48–30
79	June 26	Athletics	3–1	**Halladay** (10–3)	Outman (3–2)		45,863	49–30
80	June 28	Red Sox	5–0	**Lee** (9–5)	Beckett (6–3)		45,714	50–30
81	June 29	Red Sox	2–1	**Worley** (3–1)	Lackey (5–7)	**Bastardo** (3)	45,612	51–30
82	June 30	Red Sox	2–5	Lester (10–4)	**Herndon** (0–2)	Papelbon (15)	45,810	51–31

July (17–8) – home (9–4) – road (8–4)

#	Date	Opponent	Score	Win	Loss	Save	Attendance	Record
83	July 1	@ Blue Jays	7–6	**Báez** (2–3)	Francisco (1–4)	**Bastardo** (4)	45,512	52–31
84	July 2	@ Blue Jays	5–3	**Halladay** (11–3)	Pérez (1–1)		44,078	53–31
85	July 3	@ Blue Jays	4–7	Dotel (2–1)	**Lee** (9–6)		26,204	53–32
86	July 4	@ Marlins	1–0	**Worley** (4–1)	Nolasco (5–5)	**Bastardo** (5)	27,103	54–32
87	July 5	@ Marlins	14–2	**Hamels** (10–4)	Volstad (4–8)		17,333	55–32
88	July 6	@ Marlins	6–7 (10)	Mujica (6–2)	**Báez** (2–4)		16,123	55–33
89	July 8	Braves	3–2 (10)	**Pérez** (1–0)	Proctor (1–3)		45,403	56–33
90	July 9	Braves	1–4 (11)	Sherrill (2–1)	**Stutes** (3–1)	Kimbrel (28)	45,637	56–34
91	July 10	Braves	14–1	**Hamels** (11–4)	Lowe (5–7)		45,853	57–34
**All-Star Break**
92	July 15	@ Mets	7–2	**Worley** (5–1)	Dickey (4–8)		37,304	58–34
93	July 16	@ Mets	2–11	Niese (9–7)	**Hamels** (11–5)		41,166	58–35
94	July 17	@ Mets	8–5	**Kendrick** (5–4)	Pelfrey (5–9)	**Bastardo** (6)	34,695	59–35
95	July 18	@ Cubs	1–6	López (2–2)	**Halladay** (11–4)		38,183	59–36
96	July 19	@ Cubs	4–2	**Stutes** (4–1)	Marshall (5–4)	**Bastardo** (7)	38,857	60–36
97	July 20	@ Cubs	9–1	**Worley** (6–1)	Dempster (7–7)		37,864	61–36
98	July 22	Padres	3–1	**Hamels** (12–5)	Luebke (3–4)	**Madson** (16)	45,383	62–36
99	July 23	Padres	8–6	**Stutes** (5–1)	Qualls (4–5)	**Madson** (17)	45,072	63–36
100	July 24	Padres	4–2	**Halladay** (12–4)	Stauffer (6–7)	**Bastardo** (8)	45,241	64–36
101	July 25	Padres	4–5	Harang (9–2)	**Lee** (9–7)	Bell (29)	45,640	64–37
102	July 26	Giants	7–2	**Worley** (7–1)	Zito (3–3)		45,740	65–37
103	July 27	Giants	1–2	Cain (9–6)	**Hamels** (12–6)	Wilson (32)	45,800	65–38
104	July 28	Giants	1–4	Lincecum (9–8)	**Kendrick** (5–5)	Wilson (33)	45,646	65–39
105	July 29	Pirates	10–3	**Halladay** (13–4)	Morton (8–6)		45,599	66–39
106	July 30	Pirates	7–4	**Lee** (10–7)	McDonald (7–5)	**Madson** (18)	45,737	67–39
107	July 31	Pirates	6–5 (10)	**Bastardo** (4–0)	Watson (0–2)		45,809	68–39

August (18–7) – home (5–4) – road (12–3)

#	Date	Opponent	Score	Win	Loss	Save	Attendance	Record
108	August 1	@ Rockies	4–3 (10)	**Bastardo** (5–0)	Brothers (1–2)	**Madson** (19)	39,330	69–39
109	August 2	@ Rockies	5–0	**Kendrick** (6–5)	Cook (2–6)		39,128	70–39
110	August 3	@ Rockies	8–6	**Halladay** (14–4)	Hammel (6–11)	**Lidge** (1)	39,404	71–39
111	August 4	@ Giants	3–0	**Lee** (11–7)	Bumgarner (6–11)		42,013	72–39
112	August 5	@ Giants	9–2	**Worley** (8–1)	Sánchez (4–6)		42,165	73–39
113	August 6	@ Giants	2–1	**Hamels** (13–6)	Cain (9–8)		42,183	74–39
114	August 7	@ Giants	1–3	Lincecum (10–9)	**Oswalt** (4–7)	Wilson (34)	42,366	74–40
115	August 8	@ Dodgers	5–3	**Halladay** (15–4)	Kuroda (7–14)	**Madson** (20)	35,380	75–40
116	August 9	@ Dodgers	2–1	**Lee** (12–7)	Lilly (7–12)	**Madson** (21)	46,547	76–40
117	August 10	@ Dodgers	9–8	**Kendrick** (7–5)	Hawksworth (2–3)	**Madson** (22)	41,807	77–40
118	August 12	Nationals	2–4	Hernández (7–11)	**Hamels** (13–7)	Storen (31)	45,762	77–41
119	August 13	Nationals	11–3	**Oswalt** (5–7)	Lannan (8–8)		45,570	78–41
	August 14	Nationals	Postponed (rain); Makeup: September 20					
120	August 16	Diamondbacks	2–3	Shaw (1–0)	**Halladay** (15–5)	Putz (30)	45,742	78–42
121	August 17	Diamondbacks	9–2	**Lee** (13–7)	Saunders (8–10)		45,894	79–42
122	August 18	Diamondbacks	4–1	**Herndon** (1–2)	Kennedy (15–4)	**Madson** (23)	45,633	80–42
123	August 19	@ Nationals	4–8	Coffey (4–1)	**Madson** (3–2)		37,841	80–43
124	August 20	@ Nationals	5–0	**Oswalt** (6–7)	Lannan (8–9)		44,685	81–43
125	August 21	@ Nationals	4–5 (10)	Burnett (4–5)	**Lidge** (0–1)		41,727	81–44
126	August 22	Mets	10–0	**Lee** (14–7)	Gee (11–5)		45,783	82–44
127	August 23	Mets	9–4	**Worley** (9–1)	Niese (11–11)		45,770	83–44
128	August 24	Mets	4–7	Pelfrey (7–10)	**Kendrick** (7–6)	Parnell (1)	45,689	83–45
129	August 26	Marlins	5–6	Hensley (2–5)	**Oswalt** (6–8)	Cishek (3)	45,523	83–46
	August 27	Marlins	Postponed (Hurricane Irene); Makeup: September 15					
	August 28	Marlins	Postponed (Hurricane Irene); Makeup: September 15					
130	August 29	@ Reds	3–2	**Bastardo** (6–0)	Bailey (7–6)	**Madson** (24)	21,360	84–46
131	August 30	@ Reds	9–0	**Halladay** (16–5)	Arroyo (8–11)		19,317	85–46
132	August 31	@ Reds	3–0	**Lee** (15–7)	Willis (0–4)	**Madson** (25)	18,567	86–46

September (16–14) – home (6–7) – road (10–7)

#	Date	Opponent	Score	Win	Loss	Save	Attendance	Record
133	September 1	@ Reds	6–4	**Worley** (10–1)	Leake (11–9)	**Madson** (26)	21,438	87–46
134	September 2	@ Marlins	5–3	**Oswalt** (7–8)	Hand (1–5)	**Madson** (27)	21,659	88–46
135	September 3	@ Marlins	4–8	Mujica (9–5)	**Bastardo** (6–1)		25,333	88–47
136	September 4	@ Marlins	4–5 (14)	Hensley (3–6)	**Herndon** (1–3)		21,234	88–48
137	September 5	Braves	9–0	**Lee** (16–7)	Lowe (9–13)		45,267	89–48
138	September 6	Braves	6–3	**Worley** (11–1)	Hudson (14–9)	**Madson** (28)	44,781	90–48
139	September 7	Braves	3–2	**Madson** (4–2)	Moylan (1–1)		44,870	91–48
140	September 8	@ Brewers	7–2	**Hamels** (14–7)	Narveson (10–7)		41,646	92–48
141	September 9	@ Brewers	5–3	**Halladay** (17–5)	Marcum (12–6)	**Madson** (29)	43,283	93–48
142	September 10	@ Brewers	3–2 (10)	**Stutes** (6–1)	Hawkins (1–1)	**Madson** (30)	42,967	94–48
143	September 11	@ Brewers	2–3	Gallardo (16–10)	**Worley** (11–2)	Axford (42)	42,388	94–49
144	September 12	@ Astros	1–5	Myers (5–13)	**Oswalt** (7–9)		22,231	94–50
145	September 13	@ Astros	2–5	Happ (6–15)	**Hamels** (14–8)		24,302	94–51
146	September 14	@ Astros	1–0	**Halladay** (18–5)	Norris (6–10)		20,027	95–51
147	September 15	Marlins	3–1	**Kendrick** (8–6)	Sánchez (8–8)	**Madson** (31)	44,216	96–51
148	September 15	Marlins	2–1 (10)	**Schwimer** (1–0)	Badenhop (2–2)		44,950	97–51
149	September 16	Cardinals	2–4 (11)	McClellan (12–6)	**Schwimer** (1–1)	Salas (24)	45,572	97–52
150	September 17	Cardinals	9–2	**Oswalt** (8–9)	Westbrook (12–9)		45,470	98–52
151	September 18	Cardinals	0–5	Carpenter (10–9)	**Hamels** (14–9)		45,063	98–53
152	September 19	Cardinals	3–4	Lohse (14–8)	**Halladay** (18–6)	Dotel (3)	45,048	98–54
153	September 20	Nationals	3–4 (10)	Gorzelanny (4–6)	**Stutes** (6–2)	Storen (39)	44,263	98–55
154	September 20	Nationals	0–3	Detwiler (3–5)	**Lee** (16–8)	Storen (40)	45,408	98–56
155	September 21	Nationals	5–7	Lannan (10–13)	**Worley** (11–3)	Rodríguez (1)	45,083	98–57
156	September 22	Nationals	1–6	Peacock (2–0)	**Oswalt** (8–10)		45,064	98–58
157	September 23	@ Mets	Postponed (rain); Makeup: September 24 as part of a Doubleheader					
157	September 24	@ Mets	1–2	Parnell (4–6)	**Lidge** (0–2)	Acosta (3)	33,961	98–59
158	September 24	@ Mets	3–6	Gee (13–6)	**Herndon** (1–4)	Acosta (4)	32,437	98–60
159	September 25	@ Mets	9–4	**Halladay** (19–6)	Pelfrey (7–13)		32,796	99–60
160	September 26	@ Braves	4–2	**Lee** (17–8)	Martínez (1–3)	**Madson** (32)	42,597	100–60
161	September 27	@ Braves	7–1	**Oswalt** (9–10)	Lowe (9–17)		38,663	101–60
162	September 28	@ Braves	4–3 (13)	**De Fratus**(1–0)	Linebrink (4–4)	**Herndon** (1)	45,350	102–60

- Phillies win
- Phillies loss
- Postponement
- Bold: Phillies team member

=== Postseason game log ===
2011 postseason game log
NLDS: 2–3

#	Date	Opponent	Score	Win	Loss	Save	Attendance	Record
1	October 1	Cardinals	11–6	**Halladay** (1–0)	Lohse (0–1)		44,122	1–0
2	October 2	Cardinals	4–5	Dotel (1–0)	**Cliff Lee** (0–1)	Motte (1)	44,066	1–1
3	October 4	@ Cardinals	3–2	**Hamels** (1–0)	García (0–1)	**Madson** (1)	48,312	2–1
4	October 5	@ Cardinals	3–5	Jackson (1–0)	**Oswalt** (0–1)	Motte (2)	48,830	2–2
5	October 7	Cardinals	0–1	Carpenter (1–0)	**Halladay** (1–1)		44,028	2–3

=== Roster ===
All players who made an appearance for the Phillies during 2011 are included.

†	Indicates players who started on Opening Day in 2011

2011 Philadelphia Phillies
**Roster**
**Pitchers**: 55 Danys Báez; 58 Antonio Bastardo; 56 Joe Blanton; 48 Andrew Carpenter; 52 José Contreras; 37 Justin De Fratus; 34 Roy Halladay ^{†}; 35 Cole Hamels; 57 David Herndon; 38 Kyle Kendrick; 33 Cliff Lee; 54 Brad Lidge; 46 Ryan Madson; 47 Scott Mathieson; 44 Roy Oswalt; 53 Juan Pérez; 16 J. C. Romero; 55 Joe Savery; 39 Michael Schwimer; 40 Michael Stutes; 49 Vance Worley; 59 Mike Zagurski	**Catchers**: 31 Erik Kratz; 51 Carlos Ruiz ^{†}; 4 Dane Sardinha; 23 Brian Schneider; **Infielders**: 16 John Bowker; 7 Ross Gload; 6 Ryan Howard ^{†}; 19 Michael Martínez; 5 Pete Orr; 27 Plácido Polanco ^{†}; 11 Jimmy Rollins ^{†}; 26 Chase Utley; 21 Wilson Valdez ^{†}	**Outfielders**: 9 Domonic Brown; 10 Ben Francisco ^{†}; 29 Raúl Ibañez ^{†}; 15 John Mayberry, Jr.; 24 Brandon Moss; 3 Hunter Pence; 8 Shane Victorino ^{†}	**Manager**: 41 Charlie Manuel; **Coaches**: 17 Mick Billmeyer (bullpen); 30 Rich Dubee (pitching); 18 Greg Gross (hitting); 22 Pete Mackanin (bench); 2 Sam Perlozzo (1B); 12 Juan Samuel (3B); 81 Jesús Tiamo (bullpen catcher)

== Player stats ==
=== Batting ===
Note: G = Games played; AB = At bats; R = Runs; H = Hits; 2B = Doubles; 3B = Triples; HR = Home runs; RBI = Runs batted in; SB = Stolen bases; BB = Walks; AVG = Batting average; SLG = Slugging average

Player	G	AB	R	H	2B	3B	HR	RBI	SB	BB	AVG	SLG
Jimmy Rollins	142	567	87	152	22	2	16	63	30	58	.268	.399
Ryan Howard	152	557	81	141	30	1	33	116	1	75	.253	.488
Raúl Ibañez	144	535	65	131	31	1	20	84	2	33	.245	.419
Shane Victorino	132	519	95	145	27	16	17	61	19	55	.279	.491
Plácido Polanco	122	469	46	130	14	0	5	50	3	42	.277	.339
Carlos Ruiz	132	410	49	116	23	0	6	40	1	48	.283	.383
Chase Utley	103	398	54	103	21	6	11	44	14	39	.259	.425
Wilson Valdez	99	273	39	68	14	4	1	30	3	18	.249	.341
John Mayberry Jr.	104	267	37	73	17	1	15	49	8	26	.273	.513
Ben Francisco	100	250	24	61	10	1	6	34	4	33	.244	.364
Michael Martínez	88	209	25	41	5	2	3	24	3	18	.196	.282
Hunter Pence	54	207	35	67	12	2	11	35	1	26	.324	.560
Domonic Brown	56	184	28	45	10	1	5	19	3	25	.245	.391
Brian Schneider	41	125	11	22	4	0	2	9	0	11	.176	.256
Ross Gload	93	113	3	29	8	0	0	8	0	3	.257	.327
Pete Orr	46	96	7	21	3	0	0	4	3	6	.219	.250
Dane Sardinha	15	32	8	7	1	0	0	1	0	10	.219	.250
John Bowker	12	13	0	0	0	0	0	0	0	0	.000	.000
Erik Kratz	2	6	0	2	1	0	0	0	0	0	.333	.500
Brandon Moss	5	6	0	0	0	0	0	0	0	0	.000	.000
Pitcher totals	162	343	19	55	5	1	2	22	1	13	.160	.198
Team totals	162	5579	713	1409	258	38	153	693	96	539	.253	.395

=== Pitching ===
Note: W = Wins; L = Losses; ERA = Earned run average; G = Games pitched; GS = Games started; SV = Saves; IP = Innings pitched; H = Hits allowed; R = Runs allowed; ER = Earned runs allowed; BB = Walks allowed; SO = Strikeouts

Player	W	L	ERA	G	GS	SV	IP	H	R	ER	BB	SO
Roy Halladay	19	6	2.35	32	32	0	233.2	208	65	61	35	220
Cliff Lee	17	8	2.40	32	32	0	232.2	197	66	62	42	238
Cole Hamels	14	9	2.79	32	31	0	216.0	169	68	67	44	194
Roy Oswalt	9	10	3.69	23	23	0	139.0	153	60	57	33	93
Vance Worley	11	3	3.01	25	21	0	131.2	116	47	44	46	119
Kyle Kendrick	8	6	3.22	34	15	0	114.2	110	50	41	30	59
Michael Stutes	6	2	3.63	57	0	0	62.0	49	25	25	28	58
Ryan Madson	4	2	2.37	62	0	32	60.2	54	16	16	16	62
Antonio Bastardo	6	1	2.64	64	0	8	58.0	28	17	17	26	70
David Herndon	1	4	3.32	45	0	1	57.0	54	26	21	24	39
Joe Blanton	1	2	5.01	11	8	0	41.1	52	23	23	9	35
Danys Báez	2	4	6.25	29	0	0	36.0	43	28	25	13	18
Brad Lidge	0	2	1.40	25	0	1	19.1	16	3	3	13	23
J.C. Romero	0	0	3.86	24	0	0	16.1	16	7	7	12	10
Michael Schwimer	1	1	5.02	12	0	0	14.1	15	8	8	7	16
José Contreras	0	0	3.86	17	0	5	14.0	11	6	6	8	13
Andrew Carpenter	0	0	7.71	6	0	0	9.1	13	8	8	4	10
Juan Pérez	1	0	3.60	8	0	0	5.0	1	2	2	5	8
Scott Mathieson	0	0	0.00	4	0	0	5.0	9	0	0	3	5
Justin De Fratus	1	0	2.25	5	0	0	4.0	1	2	1	3	3
Mike Zagurski	0	0	5.40	4	0	0	3.1	4	2	2	3	4
Joe Savery	0	0	0.00	4	0	0	2.2	1	0	0	0	2
Wilson Valdez	1	0	0.00	1	0	0	1.0	0	0	0	0	0
Team totals	102	60	3.02	162	162	47	1477.0	1320	529	495	404	1299

=== 2011 N.L. Division Series vs. St. Louis Cardinals ===
The Phillies finished out the season with a sweep of the Atlanta Braves, and in doing so, allowed the St. Louis Cardinals to clinch the National League wild-card on the last day of the regular season. Having finished with the best record for the second year in a row, the Phillies had home-field advantage for the series. Game 1 saw the Cardinals jump out to an early lead, with a three-run homer by Lance Berkman in the top of the 1st, off Phillies ace Roy Halladay. The Phillies bats woke up in the 6th inning, with home runs by Ryan Howard and Raúl Ibañez. In addition to the offense waking up, Halladay tamed the Cardinals, retiring 21 straight batters, and the Phillies took game 1, 11–6. Game 2 featured another Philadelphia ace, Cliff Lee, facing the Cardinals' Chris Carpenter, who would make his first start on three days rest of his career. The Phillies jumped out to a 4-run lead, however, Cliff Lee surrendered 5 runs, as the Cardinals came back, and took game 2, 5–4. The series then went to Busch Stadium in St. Louis for games 3 and 4. Game 3 featured Cole Hamels taking on Jaime García, both of whom pitched a scoreless game through 6 innings. In the 7th inning, the Phillies' pinch-hitter Ben Francisco fired a three-run homer to give the Phillies the lead. The Cardinals were able to fight back and get 2 runs, but Ryan Madson shut the door, with a 5-out save, to give the Phillies a 2–1 series lead. In Game 4, a matchup between Roy Oswalt and Edwin Jackson, the Phillies again jumped out to an early 2-run lead. The Cardinals cut the lead in half in the bottom of the first. David Freese was the hero of game 4, with a two-run double in the fourth, which gave the Cardinals the lead, and a two-run homer in the sixth. The Phillies were not able to come back, and that sent the series back to Philadelphia tied at two games. Game 5 featured a marquee pitching matchup, with former Toronto teammates, Roy Halladay and Chris Carpenter facing off. Again, the Cardinals took an early lead, with Rafael Furcal scoring off a Skip Schumaker double. It turned out that was all the Cardinals needed, as they went on to win, 1–0. For the Cardinals, it added to their thus-far improbable season, and advanced to the NLCS for the first time since winning the 2006 World Series. First baseman Ryan Howard suffered a torn Achilles tendon, that would forced him to miss some time for the 2012 season.

St. Louis Cardinals won the series, 3–2.

Game	Date	Score	Location	Time	Attendance
1	October 1	St. Louis Cardinals – 6, Philadelphia Phillies – 11	Citizens Bank Park	2:55	46,480
2	October 2	St. Louis Cardinals – 5, Philadelphia Phillies – 4	Citizens Bank Park	3:22	46,575
3	October 4	Philadelphia Phillies – 3, St. Louis Cardinals – 2	Busch Stadium	3:13	46,914
4	October 5	Philadelphia Phillies – 3, St. Louis Cardinals – 5	Busch Stadium	2:34	47,071
5	October 7	St. Louis Cardinals – 1, Philadelphia Phillies – 0	Citizens Bank Park	2:29	46,530

== Awards ==
Vance Worley was named by Baseball America as one of the five starting pitchers on its All-Rookie Team.

Roy Halladay was named the Sportsperson of the Year by the Philadelphia Daily News for the second consecutive year.

The Philadelphia chapter of the Baseball Writers' Association of America (BBWAA) presented its annual franchise awards to Shane Victorino ("Mike Schmidt Most Valuable Player Award"), Cliff Lee ("Steve Carlton Most Valuable Pitcher Award"), Charlie Manuel ("Dallas Green Special Achievement Award"), and Raúl Ibañez ("Tug McGraw Good Guy Award").

Jimmy Rollins (shortstop) and Roy Halladay (one of three starting pitchers) were named to the MLB Insiders Club Magazine All-Postseason Team.

Shane Victorino received the Branch Rickey Award for his exceptional community service.

Retired general manager Pat Gillick was inducted into the National Baseball Hall of Fame.

== Farm system ==
Level	Team	League	Manager
AAA	Lehigh Valley IronPigs	International League	Ryne Sandberg
AA	Reading Phillies	Eastern League	Mark Parent
A	Clearwater Threshers	Florida State League	Dusty Wathan
A	Lakewood BlueClaws	South Atlantic League	Chris Truby
A-Short Season	Williamsport Crosscutters	New York–Penn League	Mickey Morandini
Rookie	GCL Phillies	Gulf Coast League	Roly de Armas
