= Sardinha =

Sardinha is a Portuguese surname. Notable people with the surname include:

- António Sardinha (1887–1925), Portuguese writer
- Bronson Sardinha (born 1983), American baseball player
- Dane Sardinha (born 1979), American baseball player
- Francisco Sardinha (born 1946), Indian politician
- Pero Fernandes Sardinha (1496–1556), Portuguese bishop
- Richard Sardinha, American artist
