= Stutes =

Stutes is an American surname. Notable people with the surname include:

- Louise Stutes (born 1952), American politician
- Michael Stutes (born 1986), American baseball player

== See also ==
- Stute
