= Antonio Bastardo =

Dominican baseball player (born 1985)

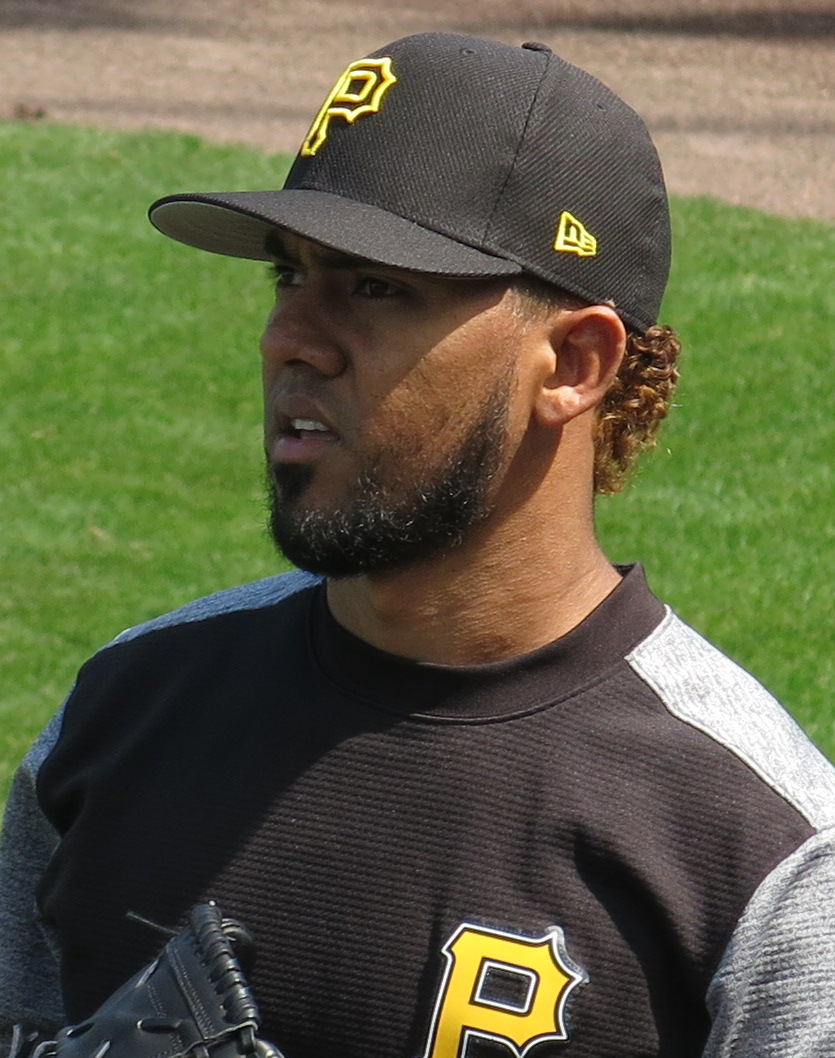
- Bastardo with the Pittsburgh Pirates in 2017
- Pitcher
- Born: September 21, 1985 (age 40); Hato Mayor del Rey, Dominican Republic
- Batted: Right Threw: Left

MLB debut
- June 2, 2009, for the Philadelphia Phillies

Last MLB appearance
- July 7, 2017, for the Pittsburgh Pirates

Career statistics
- Win–loss record: 27–20
- Earned run average: 4.01
- Strikeouts: 470
- Stats at Baseball Reference

Teams
- Philadelphia Phillies (2009–2014); Pittsburgh Pirates (2015); New York Mets (2016); Pittsburgh Pirates (2016–2017)

Antonio Francisco Bastardo Rafael (born September 21, 1985) is a Dominican former professional baseball relief pitcher. He played in Major League Baseball (MLB) for the Philadelphia Phillies, Pittsburgh Pirates, and New York Mets.

== Professional career ==
=== Philadelphia Phillies ===
==== 2007 ====
Bastardo signed with the Philadelphia Phillies in February 2005. He made his professional debut with the Gulf Coast Phillies in 2006. In 2007, the team assigned him to the Lakewood BlueClaws of the "Low A" South Atlantic League. In Lakewood, Bastardo went 9–0 with a 1.87 earned run average in 15 games, all of which he started. He had 98 strikeouts and 42 walks in 91 2/3 innings of work.

At the end of the 2007 season, Bastardo was promoted to the Clearwater Threshers of the High-A Florida State League. For the Threshers in 2007, Bastardo appeared in one game, in which he gave up four earned runs but struck out 12 in five innings.

==== 2008 ====
Bastardo began the 2008 season in Clearwater, where he went 2–0 with a 1.17 earned run average and struck out 47 batters in his 30 2/3 innings of work. He was then called up to the Reading Phillies of the Double-A Eastern League.

In Reading, Bastardo went 2–5 with a 3.76 earned run average in 14 starts. He pitched 67 innings, striking out 62, walking 37, and allowing 56 hits.

==== 2009 ====
Before the 2009 season, Bastardo was converted from a starting pitcher to a relief pitcher, but was converted right back to a starter after only a handful of outings. Phillies pitching coach Rich Dubee said that Bastardo had a chance to be in the major leagues at some point in 2009. He was also invited to the Phillies' training camp as a non-roster invitee but was sent to minor league camp on March 16.

After he was sent down, Bastardo joined the Lehigh Valley IronPigs for the rest of spring training before being sent down to the Reading Phillies.

Baseball America ranked him as the 11th-best prospect in the Phillies organization in 2009.

After posting a 2–2 record, 1.82 ERA in nine games, Bastardo was called up to Lehigh Valley. On May 30, 2009, the Phillies announced that Bastardo would make his major league debut in a start at San Diego on June 2.

==== 2009 ====
After Brett Myers tore his labrum and was placed on the 15-day disabled list, Philadelphia called up Bastardo on June 2, 2009. He won in his first start against the San Diego Padres, allowing only one earned run during his six innings pitched. After his Phillies' debut, Bastardo recorded a 2–3 record with a 6.75 ERA and 19 strikeouts. On June 25, during a start against the Tampa Bay Rays he suffered a shoulder injury that forced him to go on the disabled list. He returned to the Phillies roster for the postseason, where he made a relief appearance in the second game of the National League Division Series against the Colorado Rockies, striking out Jason Giambi with two outs and the bases loaded. He gave up a double to the only other batter he faced in the postseason, Andre Ethier during Game 1 of the National League Championship Series.

==== 2010 ====
For the 2010 season, Bastardo was converted into a full-time relief pitcher. He was placed on the 15-day disabled list on June 17. For the season, he recorded two wins and no losses, and an ERA of 4.34.

==== 2011 ====
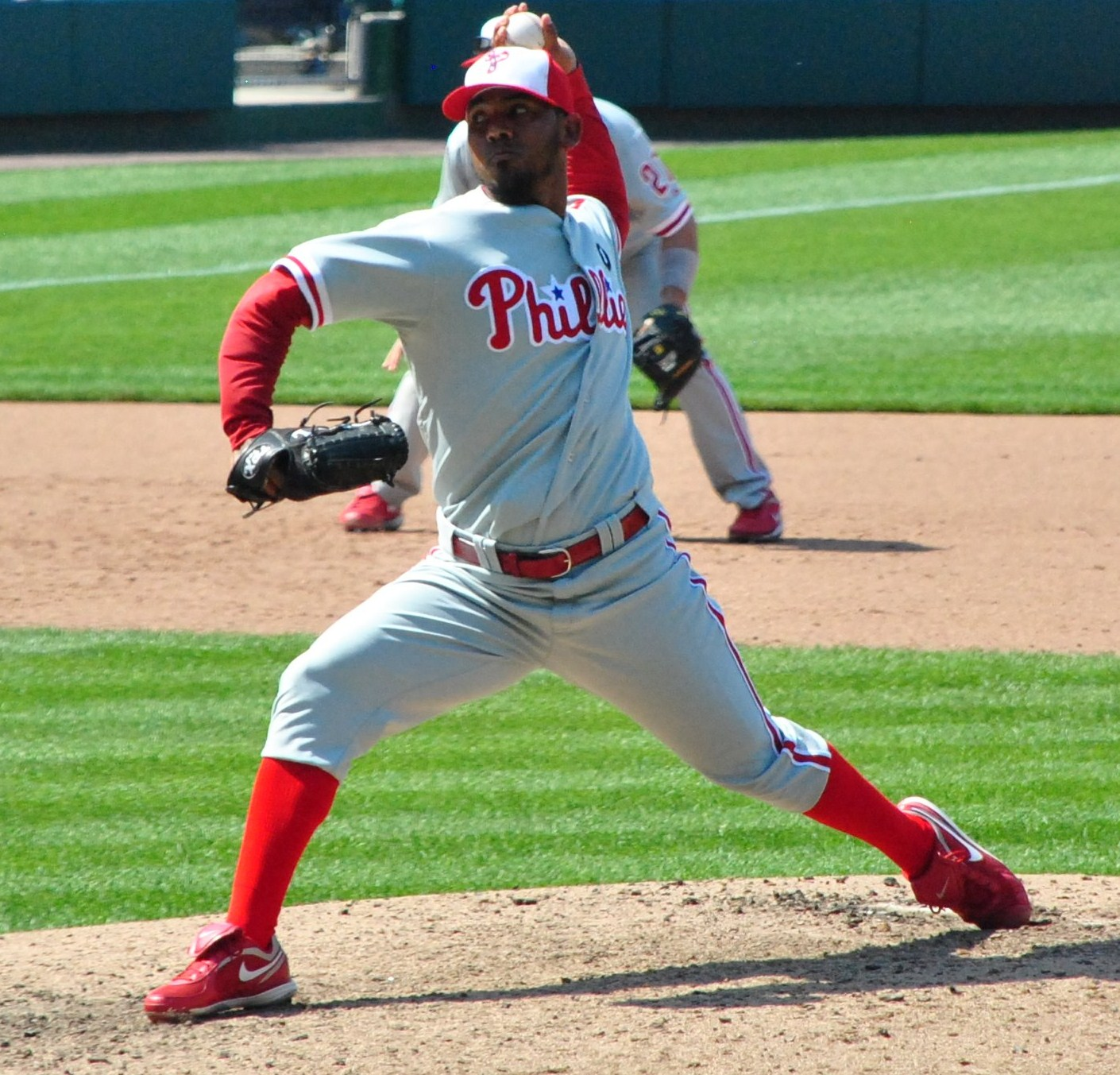
Bastardo pitching for the Phillies in 2011

On April 24, Bastardo earned his first save in the major leagues when he relieved Roy Halladay after 8 2/3 innings, inducing San Diego's Nick Hundley to fly out to end the game. Bastardo was chosen as interim closer for the Phillies when Ryan Madson went on the disabled list.

Bastardo had 18 consecutive scoreless appearances from late May to mid-July, lowering his ERA to 0.79. He finished the season with a 6–1 record and a 2.64 ERA.

On November 14, 2011, it was announced that Bastardo had agreed to let Jonathan Papelbon wear Bastardo's former number 58. Bastardo would end up wearing number 37.

==== 2012 ====
In 2012, Bastardo posted a win–loss record of 2-5 and an ERA of 4.33. Following the season, Bastardo changed his number again, this time to 59, so relief pitcher Mike Adams could wear his number 37.

==== 2013 ====
On August 5, 2013, MLB suspended Bastardo for 50 games as part of the Biogenesis doping scandal. At the time of his suspension, which kept him out for the remainder of the season, he was 3–2 with an ERA of 2.32.

==== 2014 ====
Coming off part of a season during which he was one of the Phillies most "reliable" relief pitchers, Bastardo sought to stabilize the bullpen in 2014 for the Phillies. He recorded an ERA of 3.94 in 67 games.

=== Pittsburgh Pirates ===
On December 10, 2014, the Phillies traded Bastardo to the Pittsburgh Pirates in exchange for Joely Rodríguez. Bastardo appeared in 66 games for the Pirates in 2015, recording a 4–1 record, one save, and an ERA of 2.91. He made his final postseason appearance in the Wild Card Game, striking out two of the three Chicago Cubs he faced in a clean inning.

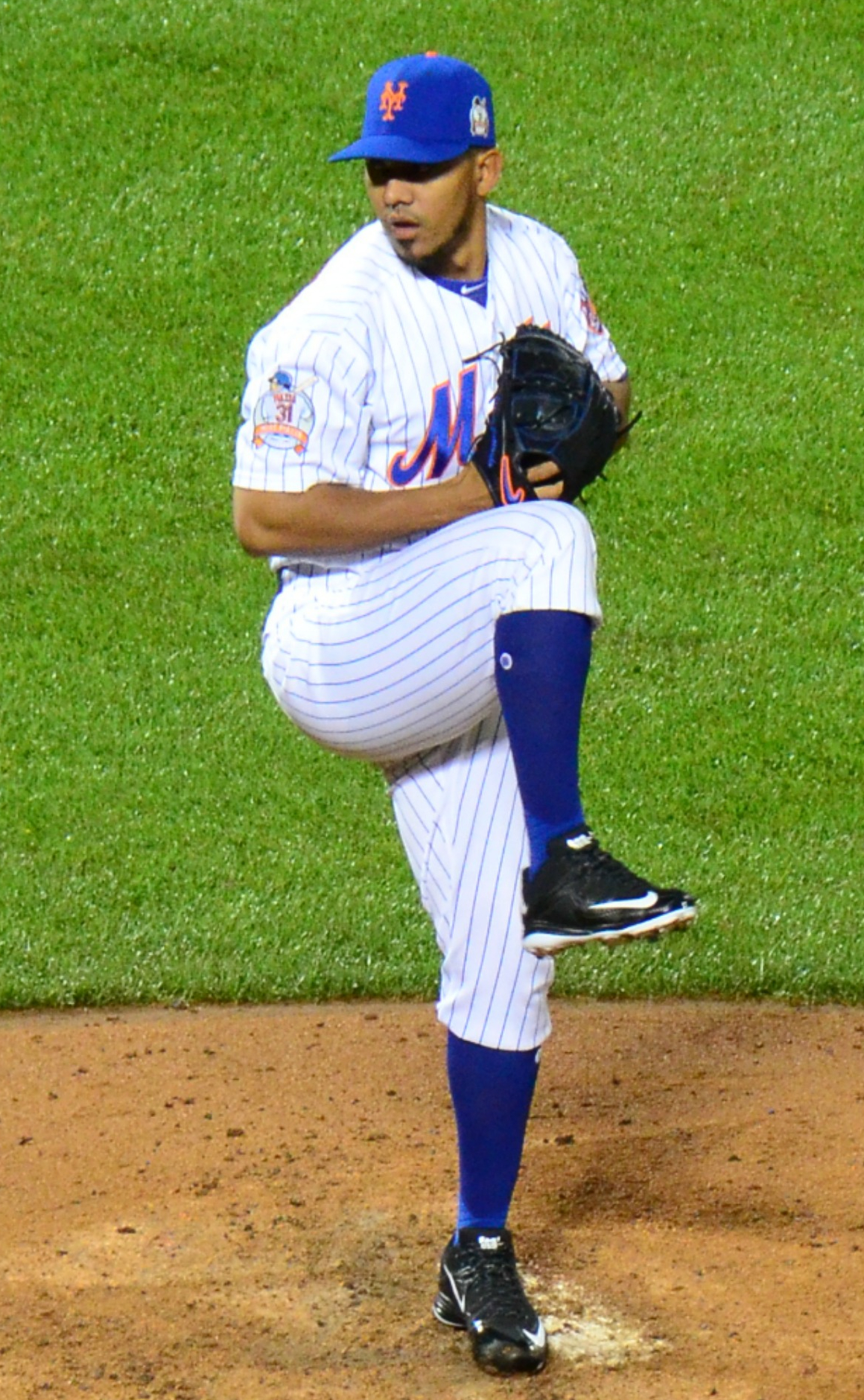
Bastardo pitching for the Mets in 2016

=== New York Mets ===
On January 22, 2016, Bastardo signed a two-year, $12 million contract with the New York Mets. In 41 games with the Mets, Bastardo recorded an ERA of 4.74.

=== Pittsburgh Pirates (second stint) ===
On August 1, 2016, the Mets traded Bastardo back to the Pittsburgh Pirates for Jon Niese. Bastardo made his Pirates return debut the next day. In 28 appearances out of the bullpen, Bastardo posted a 3–0 record and 4.13 ERA with 28 strikeouts over 25 innings of work. With Pittsburgh and New York in 2016, he shared the major league lead in balks, with four.

Bastardo spent two months on the disabled list in 2017 with a quad strain. He was ineffective in his 9 appearances for the Pirates, sporting an ERA of 15.00. Bastardo was designated for assignment on July 8. He was released by the Pirates organization on July 13.

=== Arizona Diamondbacks ===
On January 23, 2018, the Arizona Diamondbacks signed Bastardo to a minor league contract. He was released prior to the start of the season on March 20.

On July 20, 2018, Bastardo was suspended 140 games for testing positive for the performance-enhancing drug stanozolol.

== See also ==
- List of Major League Baseball players suspended for performance-enhancing drugs
