= Tyson Brummett =

American baseball player (1984–2020)

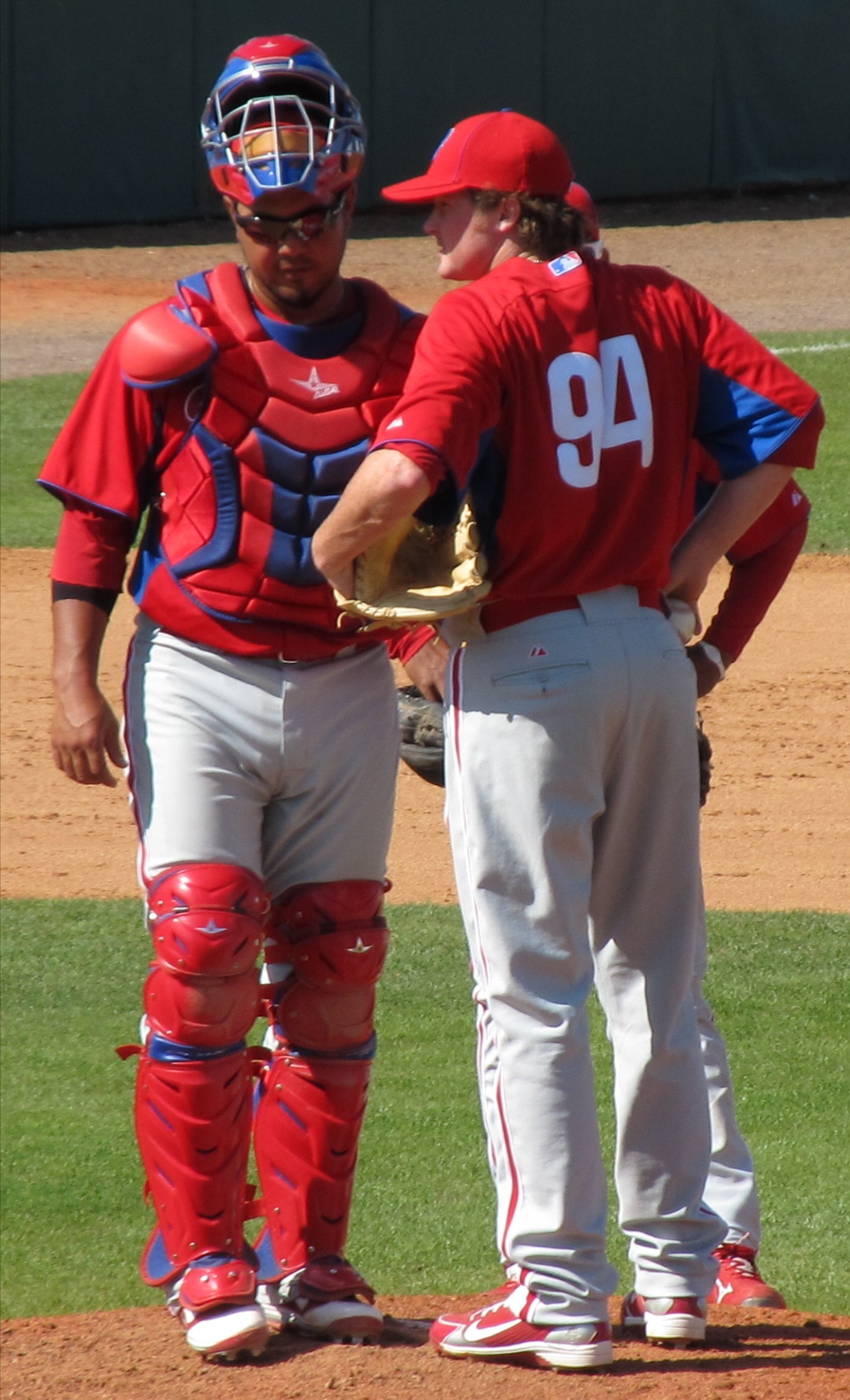
- Brummett (No. 94) with catcher Dane Sardinha, at spring training in 2011
- Pitcher
- Born: August 15, 1984; Columbus, Mississippi, U.S.
- Died: July 3, 2020 (aged 35); Alpine, Utah, U.S.
- Batted: Right Threw: Right

MLB debut
- October 3, 2012, for the Philadelphia Phillies

Last MLB appearance
- October 3, 2012, for the Philadelphia Phillies

MLB statistics
- Win–loss record: 0–0
- Earned run average: 0.00
- Strikeouts: 2
- Stats at Baseball Reference

Teams
- Philadelphia Phillies (2012)

Tyson Colby Brummett (August 15, 1984 – July 3, 2020) was an American professional baseball pitcher. He played one game in Major League Baseball (MLB) for the Philadelphia Phillies on October 3, 2012. He batted and threw right-handed and served primarily as a starting pitcher.

Brummett was drafted by the Phillies in 2007 and played for five of their minor league affiliates until 2012, when the organization promoted him to the major leagues. After the season ended, he was claimed off waivers by the Toronto Blue Jays. He subsequently signed with the Los Angeles Dodgers as a free agent in 2014, and was released in August of that same year, having not played a major league game with either team. He died six years later when the plane he was piloting crashed in Utah.

== Early life ==
Brummett was born in Columbus, Mississippi, on August 15, 1984. He attended Spanish Fork High School in Spanish Fork, Utah. After Brummett graduated, the San Francisco Giants selected him in the 35th round of the 2003 Major League Baseball draft. Brummett chose not to sign, instead enrolling at Central Arizona College. The Giants again selected Brummett, this time in the 38th round of the 2004 Major League Baseball draft, but he opted to transfer to the University of California, Los Angeles (UCLA), where he played college baseball for the UCLA Bruins.

The Phillies selected Brummett out of UCLA in the seventh round of the 2007 MLB draft. This time, he signed for the organization on June 15, 2007.

== Professional career ==
=== Minor leagues ===
Brummett spent 2007 and 2008 in the lower levels of the Phillies' farm system before being promoted to the Double-A Reading Phillies in 2008. He split his time in the years between 2009 and 2012 between the Single-A Clearwater Threshers, Reading, and the Triple-A Lehigh Valley IronPigs, posting a 14–30 win–loss record over 121 games, including 30 starts.

=== Philadelphia Phillies ===
Brummett's contract was purchased by the Philadelphia Phillies on September 30, 2012, four games prior to the season's conclusion. One month after last pitching in a game, Brummett had returned home to Utah to ready himself for winter baseball. Brummett made his major league debut as the Phillies' last pitcher of the last game of the season. It was October 3, a 5–1 loss at Washington. Brummett entered the game in the bottom of the eighth inning in relief of Jonathan Papelbon with one out and the bases empty. After giving up consecutive singles to the first two batters he faced, he struck out Jesús Flores and pinch hitter Chad Tracy to end the inning.

=== Toronto Blue Jays ===
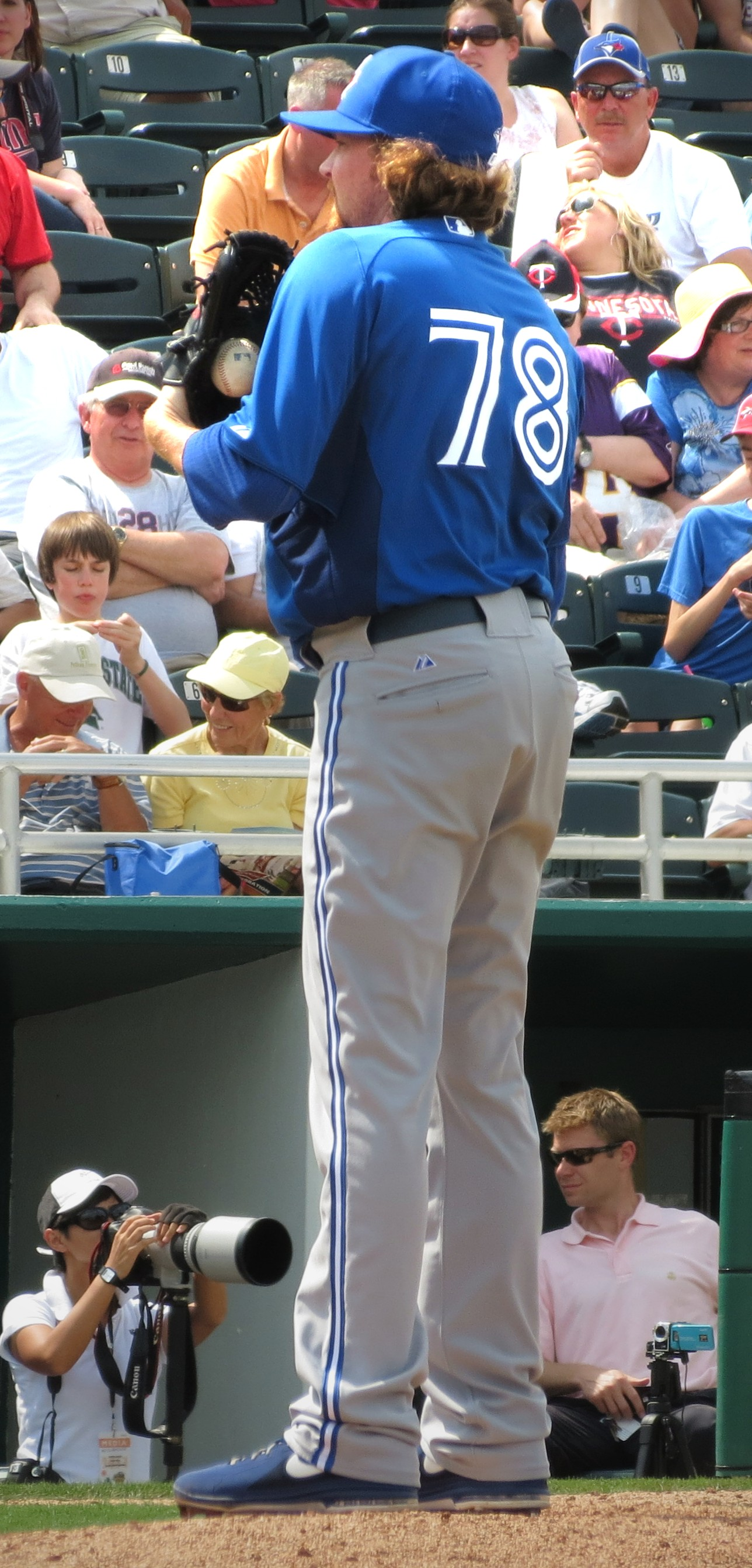
Brummett pitching for the Toronto Blue Jays in 2013 spring training

The Toronto Blue Jays claimed Brummett off waivers from the Phillies on October 18, 2012. He was designated for assignment on October 23 to make room for David Herndon on their 40-man roster. According to the Jays transaction page, Brummett was assigned outright to their Triple-A affiliate Buffalo Bisons on October 26. On February 17, The Blue Jays invited Brummett to spring training as a non roster invitee.

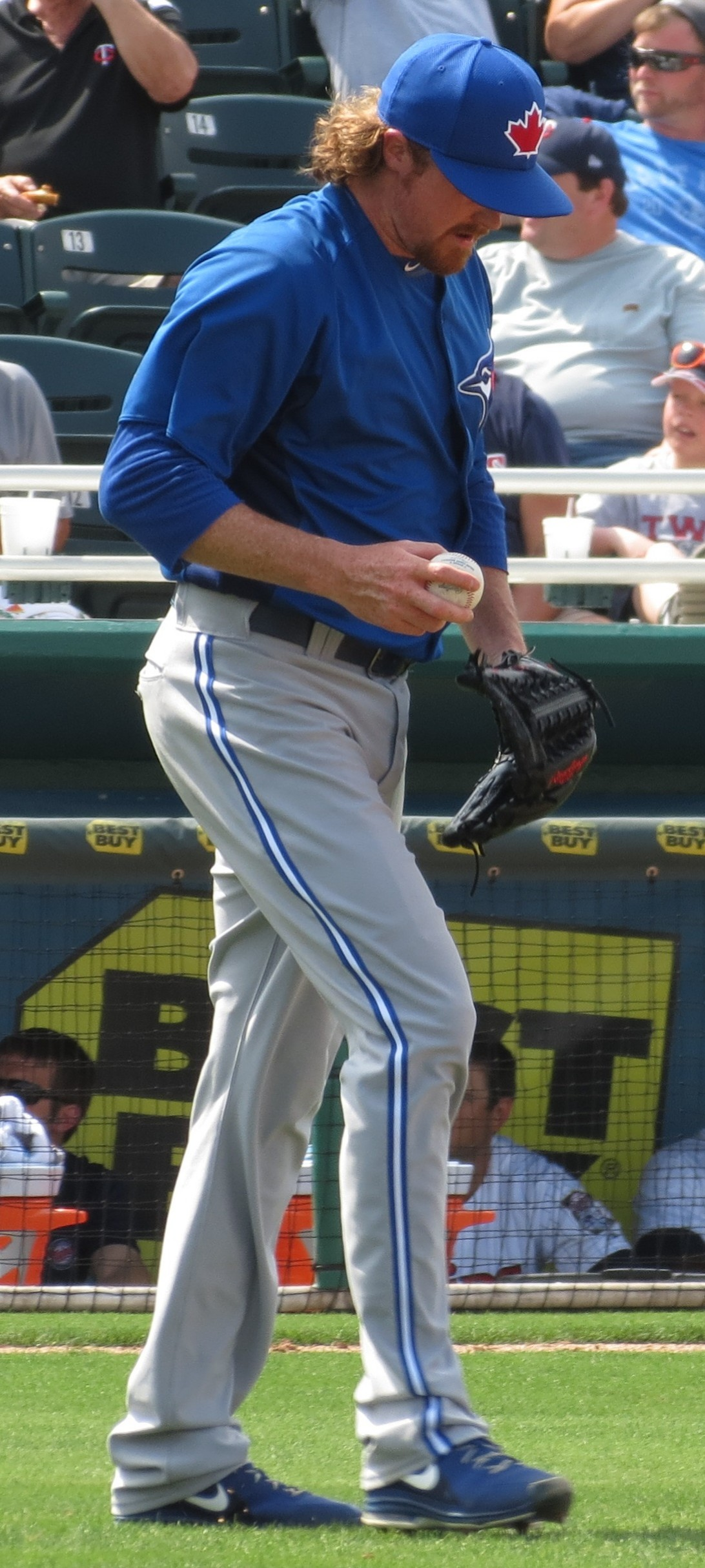
Brummett during his tenure with the Toronto Blue Jays in 2013 spring training

Brummett started the 2013 season with the Double-A New Hampshire Fisher Cats, and was called up to the Triple-A Buffalo Bisons on April 7. Four days later, Brummett was sent back to the Fisher Cats.

=== Los Angeles Dodgers ===
Brummet signed a minor league deal with the Los Angeles Dodgers in February 2014 and was assigned to the AA Chattanooga Lookouts, where he was selected to the mid-season Southern League all-star team. He finished the season with a 4–5 record and 2.79 ERA in 13 starts for the Lookouts. He was released on August 11, 2014.

=== Tiburones de La Guaira ===
Brummett spent the 2011 and 2012 offseasons playing for the Tiburones de La Guaira of the Venezuelan Winter League. In 2011, Brummett went 1–0 with a 1.59 ERA in 3 starts during the regular season. He helped lead the Tiburones to the League Championship series where they would eventually win the Championship. In 2012, Brummett went 4–1 with a 3.79 ERA in 11 games started. In 57 innings pitched, he had 27 strikeouts while allowing 19 walks.

== Post-playing career and death ==
After retiring from baseball, Brummett became a pilot and certified flight instructor. During the COVID-19 pandemic, he participated in Goggles for Docs, a nonprofit grassroots drive that amassed ski or snowboard goggles to give to health care workers.

Brummett was killed in an airplane crash in the mountains north of Alpine, Utah, on July 3, 2020, at the age of 35. According to the local sheriff's office, Brummett and three passengers died in the crash.
