= Philadelphia Phillies annual franchise awards =

Baseball awards

The Philadelphia Phillies annual franchise awards have been given since 2004 by the Philadelphia chapter of the Baseball Writers' Association of America to four members of the Philadelphia Phillies franchise for "season-ending achievements." The awards were created by Bucks County Courier Times Phillies beat writer Randy Miller, who also served as the chairman of the BBWAA's Philadelphia chapter. Winners receive a glass trophy shaped like home plate. In 2014, a fifth award was added: the Charlie Manuel Award for Service and Passion to Baseball. It was discontinued in 2015.

== Winners ==
Year	Mike Schmidt Most Valuable Player	Steve Carlton Most Valuable Pitcher	Dallas Green Special Achievement	Tug McGraw Good Guy Award	Charlie Manuel Award for Service and Passion to Baseball
2004	Bobby Abreu	Ryan Madson	John Vukovich	Amaury Telemaco	
2005	Pat Burrell & Chase Utley	Billy Wagner	Mage McDonnell	Billy Wagner	
2006	Ryan Howard	Tom Gordon	Chris Coste	Mike Lieberthal	
2007	Jimmy Rollins	Cole Hamels	Larry Shenk	Aaron Rowand	
2008	Brad Lidge	Cole Hamels	Jamie Moyer	Greg Dobbs	
2009	Ryan Howard	J. A. Happ	Jamie Moyer	Brad Lidge	
2010	Ryan Howard	Roy Halladay	Roy Halladay	Shane Victorino	
2011	Shane Victorino	Cliff Lee	Charlie Manuel	Raúl Ibañez	
2012	Carlos Ruiz	Cole Hamels	Jimmy Rollins	Juan Pierre	
2013	Domonic Brown	Cliff Lee	Charlie Manuel	Kevin Frandsen	
2014	Marlon Byrd	Cole Hamels	Jimmy Rollins	Ryan Howard	Chris Wheeler

== See also ==
- Local recipients of Spink Award
- J. G. Taylor Spink Award (BBWAA)
- Philadelphia Phillies award winners and league leaders#Philadelphia Chapter / BBWAA awards
- Baseball awards § Awards given to members of specific teams
- Philadelphia Sports Writers Association
