= Stute =

Stute is a surname. Notable people with the surname include:

- Melvin F. Stute (1927–2020), American trainer of Thoroughbred racehorses
- Warren Stute (1921–2007), American Thoroughbred horse racing trainer
- Jannine L. Stute (1961-present), American RRT

== See also ==
- Stutes
