= Brad Lidge =

American baseball player (born 1976)

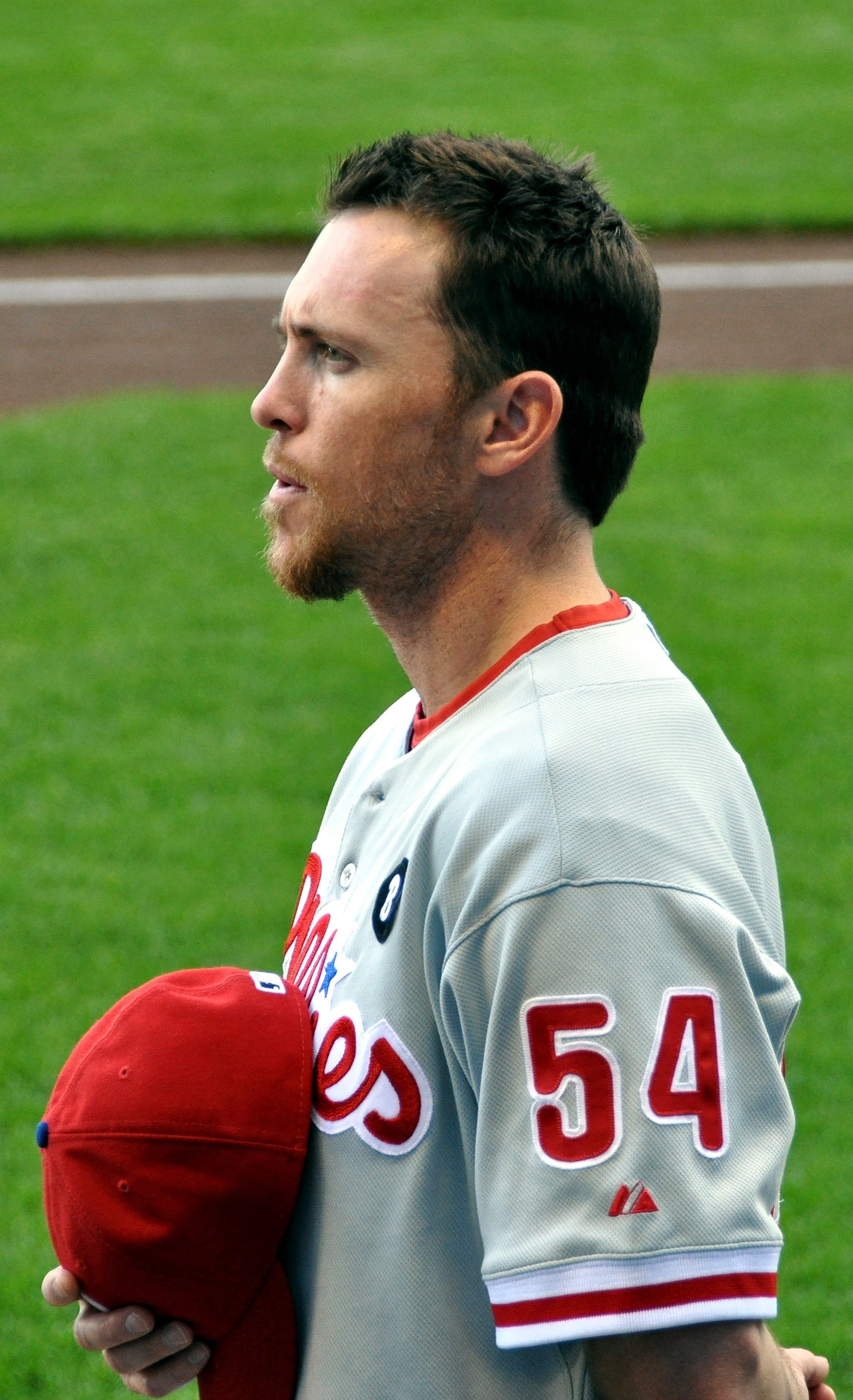
- Lidge with the Philadelphia Phillies in 2011
- Pitcher
- Born: December 23, 1976 (age 49); Sacramento, California, U.S.
- Batted: Right Threw: Right

MLB debut
- April 26, 2002, for the Houston Astros

Last MLB appearance
- June 16, 2012, for the Washington Nationals

MLB statistics
- Win–loss record: 26–32
- Earned run average: 3.54
- Strikeouts: 799
- Saves: 225
- Stats at Baseball Reference

Teams
- Houston Astros (2002–2007); Philadelphia Phillies (2008–2011); Washington Nationals (2012)

Career highlights and awards
- 2× All-Star (2005, 2008); World Series champion (2008); NL Rolaids Relief Man Award (2008); Delivery Man of the Year (2008); NL Comeback Player of the Year (2008); Pitched a combined no-hitter on June 11, 2003

Bradley Thomas Lidge (born December 23, 1976), nicknamed "Lights Out", is an American archaeologist and former professional baseball pitcher. Lidge played 11 seasons in Major League Baseball (MLB), from 2002 to 2012. He played for the Houston Astros, Philadelphia Phillies, and Washington Nationals.

Beginning his career as a relief pitcher for the Astros, Lidge became the team's closer in 2004 and rose to become one of the best in baseball, making an All-Star appearance in 2005. However, after struggles in that year's postseason and through the 2007 season, he was eventually moved out of the closer role. He was traded to the Phillies in 2008, where he returned as a closer and went a perfect 41-for-41 in save opportunities over the course of the regular season, winning the Delivery Man of the Year Award, National League (NL) Rolaids Relief Man Award, NL Comeback Player of the Year, and making another All-Star appearance. In the 2008 postseason, Lidge tied the record for most saves in a single postseason, and made the final out of the World Series for the Phillies. Injuries limited Lidge in the final four seasons of his career, eventually retiring in 2012 after a brief stint with the Nationals. He recorded 225 saves in his career. Lidge threw a four-seam fastball that consistently reached 95–97 miles per hour, as well as a hard, sharp breaking slider that ranged from 85 to 87 mph. He also had a cutter of the variation.

After completing a degree in religious studies in 2008 and retiring from the MLB, Lidge became a professional archeologist, focusing on excavations related to the Etruscan civilization.

== Early life ==
Lidge was born in Sacramento, California on December 23, 1976. His family moved to Englewood, Colorado when Lidge was very young. Growing up, Lidge played football, basketball and baseball among other sports. He attended Cherry Creek High School. Lidge initially played outfield but became a pitcher because Cherry Creek's outfield was populated by such draft prospects as Donzell McDonald. He was drafted by the San Francisco Giants in the 42nd round of the 1995 draft but did not sign.

== Baseball career ==
Lidge attended the University of Notre Dame, where he played college baseball for the Fighting Irish. He won the Big East Conference player of the year award during his junior season under coach Paul Mainieri, leading the conference with an 8–2 record and 93 strikeouts in 80 1/3 innings.

=== Houston Astros (2002–2007) ===
==== Early career ====
Lidge was a first round draft pick by the Houston Astros in the 1998 MLB draft, chosen 17th overall as a compensatory pick from the Colorado Rockies, who had signed Darryl Kile in the offseason. Lidge missed parts of his first four professional seasons (at Quad Cities, Kissimmee, Round Rock, and New Orleans) with injuries, including a torn rotator cuff and a broken forearm that threatened his career. He would overcome these injuries, making his MLB debut on April 26, 2002, against the Atlanta Braves, serving as a middle relief pitcher in the Astros' bullpen. He started the only game of his career in September of that year against the Milwaukee Brewers. Lidge went 2-for-2 with a double and 2 RBIs at the plate, but was pulled when he strained an intercostal muscle in his ribcage after pitching three scoreless innings with four strikeouts, two walks, and a hit batsman.

==== 2003–04 ====
In 2003, Lidge was the winning pitcher in the Astros' historic six-pitcher tandem which no-hit the New York Yankees on June 11. That year, Lidge was voted Astros Rookie of the Year by the Houston Chapter of the BBWAA.

Following the trades of Billy Wagner in the 2003 off-season and Octavio Dotel in the summer of 2004, the Astros moved Lidge from setup man to closer. He set a new National League record for strikeouts by a reliever with 157, passing Goose Gossage's total of 151 set in 1977. The mark is fourth all-time for relievers, behind Dick Radatz's 181 in 1964, Mark Eichhorn's 166 in 1986, and Radatz's 162 in 1963. In 2004, hitters swung and missed at Lidge's strikes almost 42% of the time; for balls out of the strike zone, batters missed more than 70% of the time. Baseball writer Joe Posnanski noted, "I have no doubt that Brad Lidge, that one year, was one of the most unhittable pitchers in the history of baseball."

==== 2005 ====
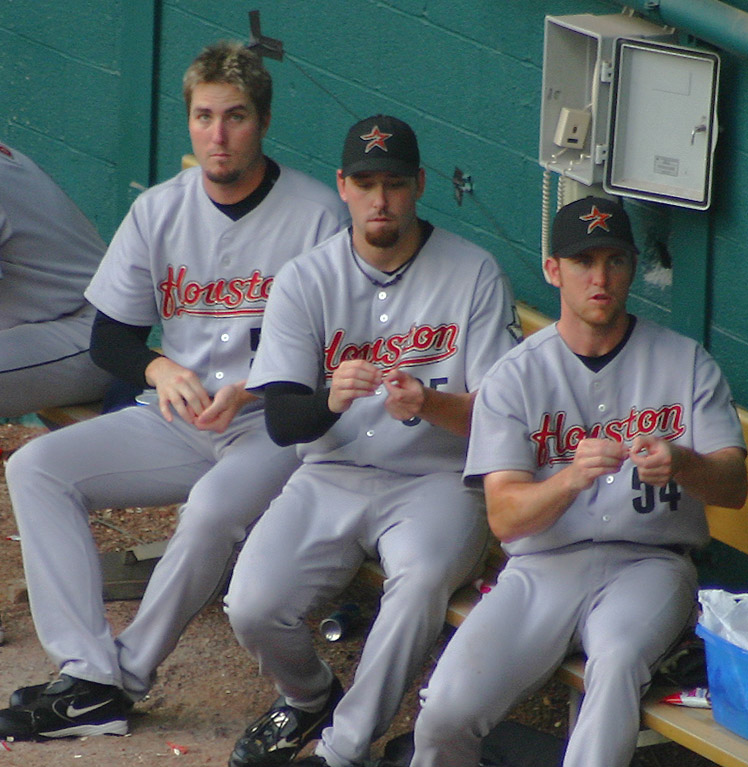
Left to right: Astros Chad Qualls, Dan Wheeler, and Lidge in 2005

In his first All-Star Game appearance in 2005, Lidge pitched the bottom of the seventh, striking out all three batters he faced. He threw 11 pitches combined, two of them balls, to Melvin Mora, Mike Sweeney, and Garret Anderson, who did not make contact with any of Lidge's pitches. Lidge became the first pitcher to strike out the side in his first All-Star appearance since Bill Caudill and Dwight Gooden in 1984.

Lidge finished the 2005 regular season with a 2.29 ERA and a career-high 42 saves. He ranked third in the National League in saves and became the second Houston pitcher ever to record at least 40 saves in one season, following Wagner.

During the NLCS, Lidge gave up a three-run home run to the Cardinals' Albert Pujols in Game 5 in Houston, forcing a Game 6 back in St. Louis, which the Astros would win to clinch their first World Series berth in franchise history. In his next appearance, Game 2 of the World Series in Chicago, Lidge gave up a walk-off home run to Scott Podsednik. He then allowed the series-winning run and hit in Game 4 to go 0–2 in the series and complete the White Sox' sweep of the Astros.

==== 2006 ====
Lidge pitched for the United States national team in the 2006 World Baseball Classic, throwing two scoreless innings. Later that year, Lidge became the third pitcher in Astros history to record 100 saves with the club, after Wagner and Dave Smith. However, after giving up a number of clutch hits in the 2005 postseason, Lidge would struggle to a 1–5 record with a 5.28 ERA in 2006.

==== 2007 ====
The Astros avoided contract arbitration with Lidge on January 17, 2007, signing him to a one-year contract worth $5.35 million. After seeing Lidge struggle in spring training and blow his first save of the season, manager Phil Garner chose to make Dan Wheeler the new Astros closer, while offering Lidge opportunities to relieve in the sixth or seventh innings of games. He regained the closer role at the start of June, but was placed on the disabled list that same month after suffering a strained left oblique muscle. Although Lidge told reporters that the injury bothered him less towards the end of the day, Garner chose to shut his closer down in order to keep the muscle strain from becoming a larger issue.

After returning to the active roster on July 13, Lidge picked up his first save of the season on July 18, against the Washington Nationals. With the July 31 trading deadline approaching, there was speculation that the Astros, who had the third-worst record in the National League (NL) would trade Lidge, but owner Drayton McLane told reporters, "I see no reason we should even consider it. He's been one of the best closers in baseball." Instead, the club traded Wheeler to the Tampa Bay Devil Rays for infielder Ty Wigginton. Despite his early-season struggles and injuries, Lidge finished the 2007 season 5–3 with 19 saves in 27 opportunities. He also held his opponents to a .218 batting average and record and average of 11.8 strikeouts per nine innings pitched (K/9). After the season, Lidge underwent surgery to repair a cartilage tear in his right knee, with the anticipation that he would be healthy for the beginning of spring training.

=== Philadelphia Phillies (2008–2011) ===
On November 7, 2007, Lidge was traded to the Philadelphia Phillies with Eric Bruntlett for Geoff Geary, Michael Bourn, and Mike Costanzo.

==== 2008 ====
Phillies fan on October 31, 2008, at World Series championship parade at 16th and Market Streets in Philadelphia

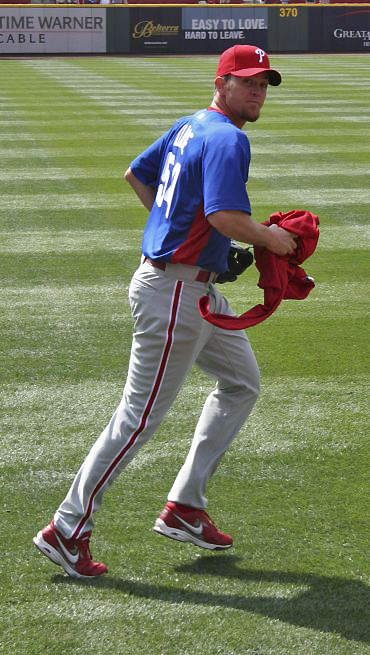
Lidge during pregame warmups for the Phillies in 2008

In February 2008, Lidge tore the meniscus in his right knee while pitching off the mound during Spring training. This was the same knee that he had had surgery on during the off-season. Later in the month, he had successful arthroscopic surgery on his right knee to repair the torn meniscus. As a result, Lidge sat out until April 5 to start the season.

Early in the 2008 season, Lidge showed signs that he regained the dominant form he displayed in his earlier career. In the opening two months of the season, he converted 12 save opportunities and allowed just two earned runs. In May, Lidge returned to Minute Maid Park, where he was greeted by a mixed reaction from Astros fans, but he recorded his 12th save of the season against his former team. He opened the month of June, usually the start of the summer's heavy-hitting season, with three saves earned in three straight games versus the Florida Marlins and the Cincinnati Reds.

In July 2008, Lidge signed a three-year contract extension with the Phillies. Lidge also set new Phillies records by converting his first 19 save opportunities and 35 straight saves.

Lidge was named to All-Star Game roster. He was announced before the game as the closer. After warming up six separate times, he ended up the final pitcher available in the game, and pitched in the 15th inning. He allowed a game-winning sacrifice fly in the bottom half of the inning, as the American League won the game, 4–3.

On September 27, 2008, Lidge became the first closer in Phillies history to be perfect in regular season saves, converting 41 in as many opportunities, as he helped secure the National League East division title for the Phillies. He was the first closer since Éric Gagné in 2003 to have a perfect conversion rate and 30+ saves. Lidge finished the season with a 1.95 ERA, and 92 strikeouts in 62 games.

Lidge saved the decisive Game 5 of the 2008 World Series in Philadelphia on October 29 over the Tampa Bay Rays with a strikeout, to make him seven-for-seven in postseason saves, thus completing his perfect season (a record he shares with John Wetteland, Troy Percival, Koji Uehara, Zack Britton, and Greg Holland. Robb Nen was also 7 for 7 in 2002 before he blew a save on the eighth opportunity).

Lidge finished eighth in NL MVP voting, behind Albert Pujols, teammate Ryan Howard and several others. Lidge was the only player other than Pujols or Howard to receive first place votes. Lidge won the MLB Comeback Player of the Year Award and Delivery Man of the Year Award. Fans voted him the MLB "This Year in Baseball Awards" Closer of the Year. Lidge was voted the Philadelphia Sports Writers Association's Outstanding Pro Athlete of the Year award and honored at their annual dinner on January 26, 2009. He was named the inaugural recipient of the Daily News Sportsperson of the Year award.

Lidge gave 12 customized Rolex Submariners to the members of the Phillies bullpen to commemorate his perfect season.

==== 2009 ====
Lidge's 2009 season was a complete reversal of fortune from the prior year, in which he was perfect in save opportunities. Through the month of June, Lidge had an ERA of 7.57 in 27 2/3 innings pitched, while he converted only 14 of 20 save opportunities. Lidge missed most of June due to injury, as he was placed on the disabled list due to a sprained right knee.

After returning to the Phillies, Lidge's performance did not improve and he continued to blow leads and save opportunities, but Phillies manager Charlie Manuel continued to support Lidge and reiterate that he was the team's closer. By September, though, Lidge had struggled long enough that Manuel began using other relievers to close games. Lidge was used in different situations out of the bullpen, but did not find a role where he pitched consistently well. Lidge finished the season with an 0–8 win–loss record, 7.21 ERA, and 31 saves in 42 opportunities, and he allowed an average of 1.81 walks plus hits per inning pitched. For closers with at least 16 saves in a season, Lidge's 2009 ERA is the worst in MLB history. Lidge's best month was July, when his ERA was 5.91, and his best save streak stretched only 8 consecutive saves.

In the National League Division Series against the Colorado Rockies, Lidge appeared in Games 3 and 4 in save situations, earning the save in both games. In Game 1 of the National League Championship Series, Lidge secured his third save, helping the Phillies win 8–6. In Game 4 of the series, Lidge pitched in relief of Scott Eyre to retire the last two batters with the Phillies trailing 4–3 in the ninth inning. He got his first win of 2009 after Jimmy Rollins hit a game-winning double to give the Phillies a 5–4 victory. Entering the World Series, Lidge and the New York Yankees' Mariano Rivera were the only closers who had not blown a save during the 2009 postseason. In Game 4, which would be Lidge's only appearance in the series, he gave up three runs in the ninth inning, giving the Yankees a 7–4 win and a 3–1 lead in the series. The Yankees went on to win the series in six games.

==== 2010 ====
Lidge underwent elbow surgery in January 2010, and he pitched in rehabilitation games with the Phillies' minor league teams (Clearwater, Reading, & Lehigh Valley) during the beginning of the 2010 season. He made his first major league appearance of the season on April 30 against the New York Mets, surrendering a home run to the first batter he faced and recording one out before being removed from the game. On June 22, Lidge recorded his 200th save against the Cleveland Indians.

After spending most of the first half on the disabled list, Lidge rebounded from the previous season. He converted 17 of his last 18 save opportunities during the regular season and recorded two saves during a 2010 postseason in which he did not allow a run. Lidge finished 2010 with a 2.96 ERA and 27 saves in 32 opportunities.

==== 2011 ====
After entering spring training healthy, Lidge was shut down on March 25 with pain in the back of his right shoulder, which he said was a new occurrence. An MRI revealed a posterior rotator cuff strain that did not require surgery, but would take three to six weeks to heal, and he began the 2011 season on the disabled list. He underwent an eight-game rehab assignment with Lakewood and Reading, going 0–0 with a 3.52 ERA and 10 strikeouts in 7.2 innings before returning to the Phillies roster on July 22. Although his fastball velocity remained consistent during Lidge's rehab appearances, hovering around 89 mph (143 km/h), Lidge and sports journalists alike voiced concerns over his control: in one appearance for Reading, he threw only 15 strikes in 28 pitches.

Lidge did not return to the closer role even after coming off of the disabled list; instead, his setup man Ryan Madson filled the ninth inning, while Lidge found himself in competition with Antonio Bastardo over who would pitch the eighth. Despite seeing a decreased velocity on his fastball, Lidge found success in later innings with his slider, working up to an 11.29 K/9 by the end of September. Lidge's strong relationship with Madson helped both players adjust to their new positions. Lidge told reporters during the NLCS that, while Madson was closing, he would find himself "shaking pitches off with [Madson]. I feel that I am there with him." Lidge played in 25 games during the 2011 season, during which he posted a 0–2 record with a 1.40 ERA and struck out 23 batters in 19 1/3 innings.

=== Washington Nationals (2012) ===
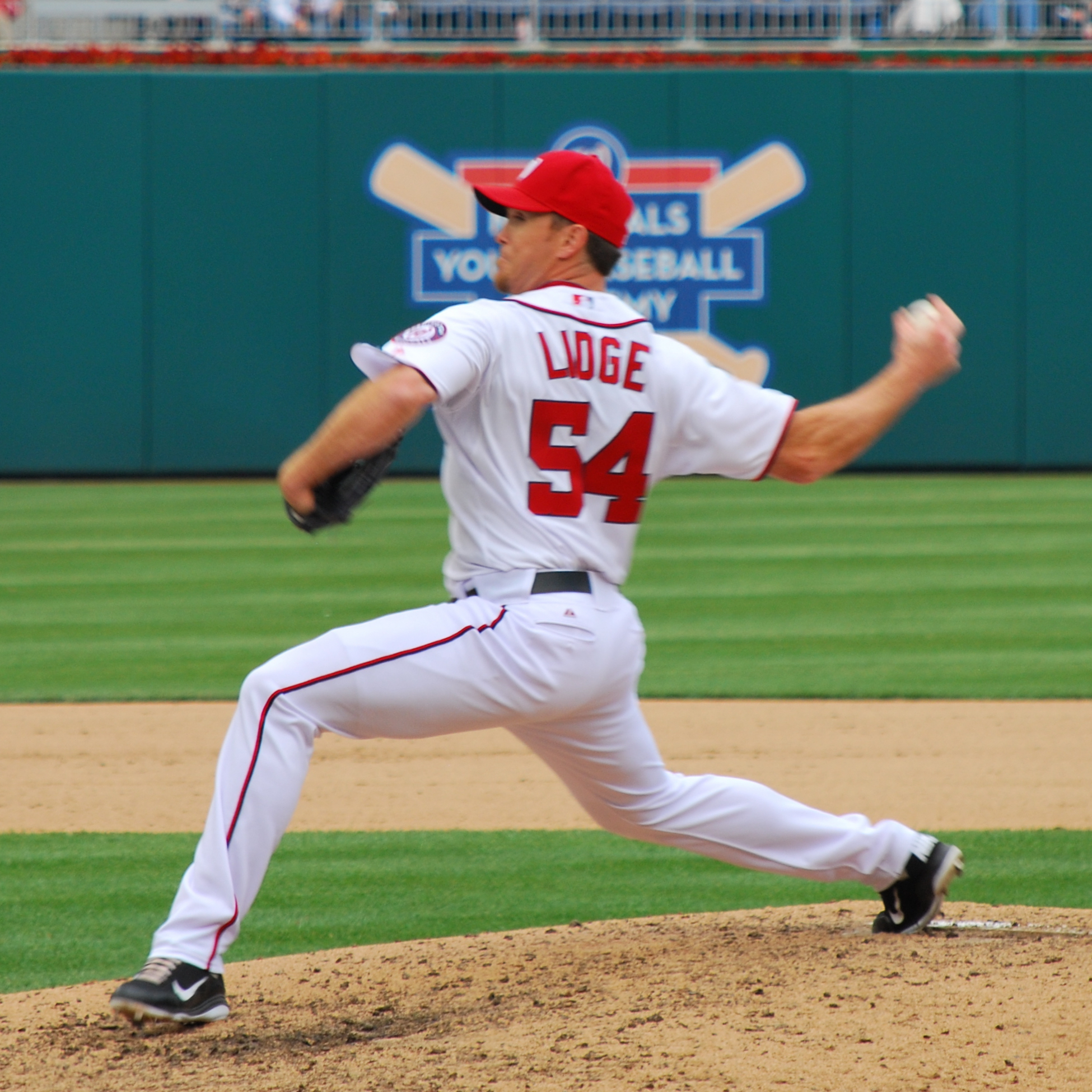
Lidge with the Washington Nationals in 2012

On January 26, 2012, the Washington Nationals signed Lidge to a one-year, $1 million contract, plus additional incentives. He had not been signed as a closer for Washington, but after Drew Storen suffered from elbow inflammation during spring training, the team prepared to use Lidge and Henry Rodríguez in the ninth inning. The pair officially took over for Storen when the latter underwent surgery for a bone chip in his elbow. After allowing four earned runs in seven innings and blowing two saves, Lidge was placed on the disabled list with an abdominal wall strain. He was diagnosed with a sports hernia and underwent surgery on May 1, with an estimated recovery time of three weeks before he could begin throwing again. After pitching a perfect inning in a rehab assignment for the Class A-Advanced Potomac Nationals, Lidge rejoined Washington on June 7, a week earlier than expected; he replaced Rodríguez, who was placed on the disabled list with a strained finger. He was unable to perform with the Nationals, going 0–1 with two saves and a 9.64 ERA in 11 bullpen appearances, with opposing hitters batting .308 against him. The Nationals designated Lidge for assignment on June 17 after two poor outings against the New York Yankees, and Ryan Mattheus was activated in his place. He was released from his contract shortly after and returned home to Colorado to spend time with his family and consider whether or not he would pursue another contract.

=== Retirement ===
After being released from the Nationals, Lidge took the remainder of the summer to decide whether he wanted to continue his pitching career. On December 2, 2012, he announced his intentions to retire from baseball. Lidge retired with 225 career regular-season saves, as well as 18 postseason saves. He also struck out 799 batters in 603 1/3 regular-season innings for a career 11.919 K/9, one of the best ratio of any pitcher with more than 500 innings. Lidge signed a ceremonial one-day contract with the Phillies on August 1, 2013, enabling him to officially retire as a member of the organization.

== Archaeology career ==
Shortly after being traded to the Phillies, Lidge enrolled in online courses via Regis University. Lidge had a longtime interest in religious archaeology and completed a bachelor's degree in religious studies at Regis in 2008. After meeting Egyptologist Josef Wegner in 2010, he realized he wanted to pursue archaeology in earnest. He became a leading donor to Wegner's work at Abydos, Egypt.

After his baseball career ended, Lidge began volunteering in archaeological fieldwork in 2013 and participated in his first excavation at Carsulae in 2014. In 2017, he completed a master's degree in ancient Mediterranean archaeology at the University of Leicester. Although his studies focused mostly on ancient Rome, he transitioned his focus to the ancient Etruscans after completing his studies. Beginning in 2021, he became a site supervisor at Poggio Civitate in Siena. He has coauthored multiple papers on Etruscan sigla. In March 2026, he was named to the board of advisors at the Penn Museum.

== Personal life ==
During his baseball career, Lidge resided in Englewood, Colorado with his wife, Lindsay, and their son and daughter. Lidge's cousin, Ryan Lidge, also played baseball at Notre Dame and was a minor league catcher in the New York Yankees organization from 2017 to 2019.

In 2009, Lidge described himself as a nondenominational Christian "with a heavy appreciation for and leaning theologically toward Catholicism." He also attended weekly Bible studies with teammates. Lidge felt that Jesus was ideologically leftist and more ideologically compatible with the Democratic than the Republican Party.

After his baseball career ended, Lidge spent time hosting a radio show and serving as a special assistant in the Phillies' front office.

== See also ==
- Houston Astros award winners and league leaders
- List of Houston Astros no-hitters
- List of Major League Baseball career saves leaders
- List of Major League Baseball no-hitters
- List of Major League Baseball single-inning strikeout leaders
- List of Philadelphia Phillies award winners and league leaders
- List of University of Notre Dame athletes

Awards and achievements
Preceded by Kevin Millwood	No-hit game June 11, 2003 (with Oswalt, Munro, Saarloos, Dotel, & Wagner)	Succeeded by Randy Johnson
Preceded by Jimmy Rollins	Mike Schmidt Most Valuable Player; 2008	Succeeded by Ryan Howard
