= David Herndon =

American baseball player (born 1985)

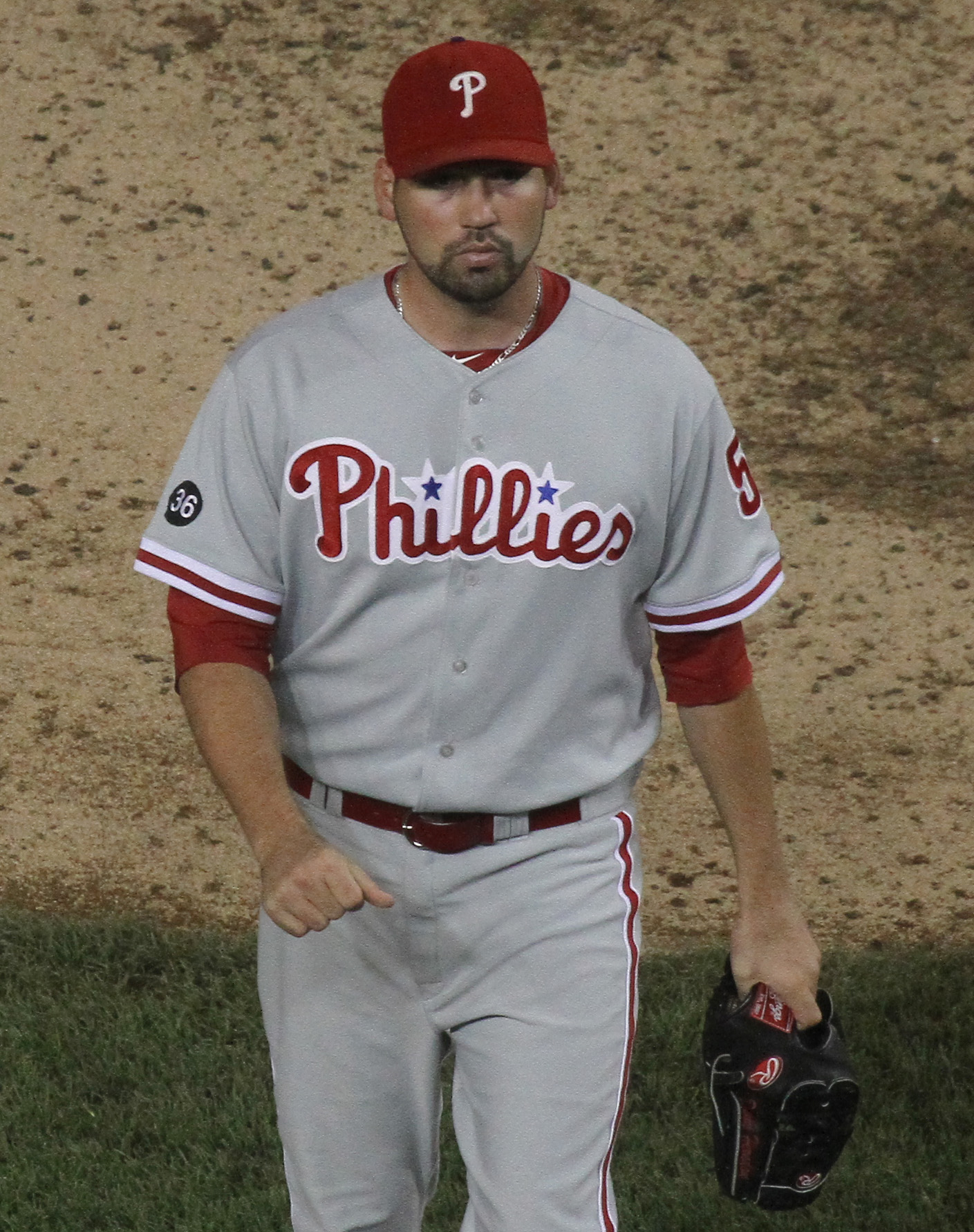
- Herndon with the Philadelphia Phillies
- Relief pitcher
- Born: September 4, 1985 (age 41); Panama City, Florida, U.S.
- Batted: Right Threw: Right

MLB debut
- April 5, 2010, for the Philadelphia Phillies

Last MLB appearance
- April 29, 2012, for the Philadelphia Phillies

MLB statistics
- Win–loss record: 2–8
- Earned run average: 3.85
- Strikeouts: 76
- Stats at Baseball Reference

Teams
- Philadelphia Phillies (2010–2012)

Kenneth David Herndon (born September 4, 1985) is an American former professional baseball pitcher. He played in Major League Baseball (MLB) for the Philadelphia Phillies.

== Career ==
=== Minor leagues ===
The 6'5", 230 pound Herndon was originally drafted by the Kansas City Royals in the 38th round of the 2004 amateur draft out of Mosley High School in Panama City, but did not sign. The following year, the Minnesota Twins drafted him in the 23rd round out of Gulf Coast Community College, but he again opted against signing. He ultimately signed with the Anaheim Angels after being drafted in the fifth round of the 2006 amateur draft.

Herndon began his professional career in 2006, going 5-2 with a 2.21 ERA in 14 starts for the Orem Owlz. In 2007, he went 13-8 with a 4.02 ERA in 25 games (24 starts) for the Cedar Rapids Kernels. He became a closer partway through the 2008 season, during which he went 3-7 with a 5.01 ERA in 43 games (12 starts) for the Rancho Cucamonga Quakes, and in 2009 he went 5-6 with a 3.03 ERA in 50 relief appearances for the Arkansas Travelers.

Herndon was selected by the Phillies in the 2009 Rule 5 Draft.

=== Philadelphia Phillies (2010–2012) ===
After the 2010 spring training, Herndon was selected for the Phillies' Opening Day roster. On April 5, he made his major league debut against the Washington Nationals. Through his first four outings he had not given up a run, but on April 16, he allowed four runs in 1/3 inning against the Florida Marlins. On July 27, Herndon picked up his first major league win versus the Arizona Diamondbacks. He ultimately earned a 1-3 record with a 4.30 ERA in 47 games; since he remained on the club's roster for the entire season, he continued in the Phillies' organization thereafter per Rule 5 regulations.

Herndon spent the majority of the 2011 season with Phillies, aside from a brief stint with the Triple-A Lehigh Valley IronPigs in which he went 2-0 with a 2.45 ERA and 1 save in 8 games. With the Phillies, Herndon went 1-4 with a 3.32 ERA in 45 games, recording his first Major League save after the 13th inning of the final game of the regular season. On June 19, 2012, Herndon underwent Tommy John surgery which ended his 2012 season.

=== New York Yankees (2013–2014) ===
The Toronto Blue Jays claimed Herndon from the Philadelphia Phillies on waivers on October 23, 2012. Tyson Brummett was designated for assignment to make room on the 40-man roster for Herndon. Herndon was subsequently designated for assignment by the Blue Jays on October 31, and claimed by the New York Yankees on November 6. The Yankees outrighted him to Triple-A but he chose to become a free agent instead. However, he re-signed with the Yankees on November 20 to a split contract.

=== Milwaukee Brewers ===
Herndon signed a minor league contract with the Milwaukee Brewers in the offseason. On March 31, 2015, he was released.

=== Sioux City Explorers ===
Herndon signed with the Sioux City Explorers of the American Association of Independent Professional Baseball after his release. He became a free agent after the 2015 season. In 17 games 23 innings of relief he went 1-1 with a 2.35 ERA with 18 strikeouts and 1 save.

== See also ==
- Rule 5 draft results
