= Bronson Sardinha =

American baseball player (born 1983)

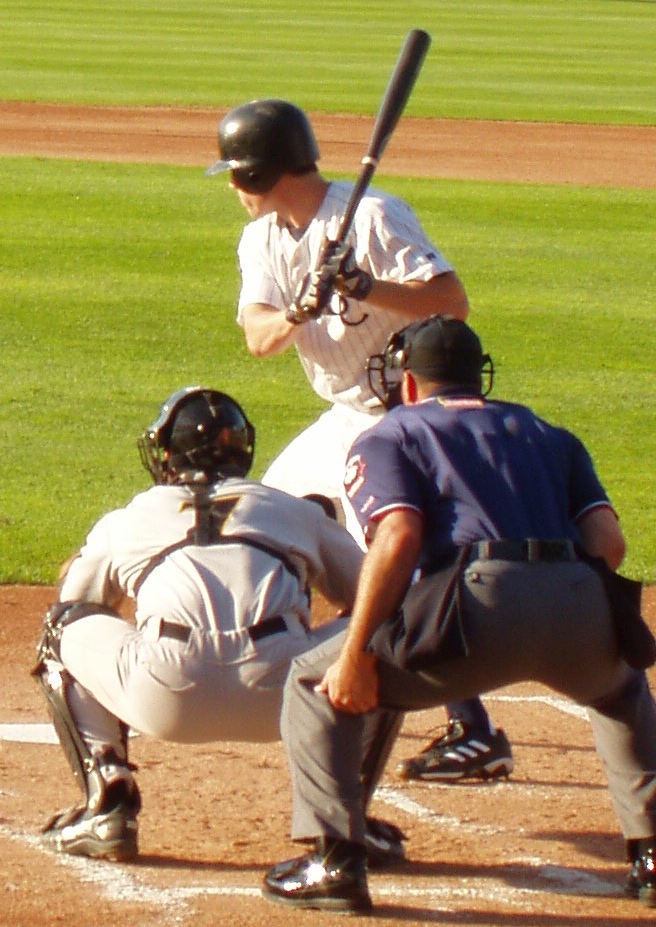
- Sardinha batting for the Battle Creek Yankees in 2003
- Outfielder
- Born: April 6, 1983 (age 43); Honolulu, Hawaii, U.S.
- Batted: Left Threw: Right

MLB debut
- September 15, 2007, for the New York Yankees

Last MLB appearance
- September 30, 2007, for the New York Yankees

MLB statistics
- Batting average: .333
- Home runs: 0
- Runs batted in: 2
- Stats at Baseball Reference

Teams
- New York Yankees (2007)

Bronson Kiheimahanaomauiakeo Sardinha (born April 6, 1983) is an American former professional baseball outfielder. He played one season in Major League Baseball (MLB) for the New York Yankees in 2007.

== Career ==
=== New York Yankees ===
Born in Honolulu, Hawaii, Sardinha was drafted out of Kamehameha High School in the 1st round of the 2001 Major League Baseball draft by the New York Yankees as a compensation pick for losing Denny Neagle. By 2002, Sardinha was moved from shortstop to outfield and was considered the organization's no. 10 prospect, according to Baseball America. He had a mixed minor league career in the Yankees organization, playing in a variety of infield and outfield spots.

Sardinha made his major league debut on September 15, 2007, against the Boston Red Sox. Coming into the game in the bottom of the 8th inning as a defensive replacement, he got his first at-bat in the top of the ninth inning. Facing Bryan Corey, on the first pitch, he grounded into a game ending double play. Sardinha got his first major league hit against the Tampa Bay Devil Rays on September 27, against Scott Kazmir. He made the team's postseason roster that year.

Sardinha was designated for assignment by the Yankees on December 8, 2007, in order to make room for the re-signed Andy Pettitte on the 40-man roster. Sardinha was not offered a new contract by the Yankees and became a free agent on December 12.

=== Seattle Mariners ===
On January 17, 2008, Sardinha was signed to a minor league contract by the Seattle Mariners, and was invited to spring training. Sardinha did not make the team and was assigned to their Triple-A affiliate, the Tacoma Rainiers, but was released early in the season due to an off-field incident. In nine games for Tacoma, he had gone 11-for-32 (.344) with five RBI and one stolen base.

=== Cleveland Indians ===
On May 6, 2008, Sardinha signed a minor league contract with the Cleveland Indians organization. He made 88 appearances for the Double-A Akron Aeros, hitting .271 with six home runs, 46 RBI, and three stolen bases; he also batted .300 with two home runs and five RBI in 12 games for the Triple-A Buffalo Bisons. Sardinha elected free agency following the season on November 3.

=== Colorado Rockies ===
On January 22, 2009, Sardinha signed a minor league contract with the Detroit Tigers organization. He was released prior to the start of the season on April 4.

After a 10-month break from professional baseball, Sardinha signed a minor league contract with the Colorado Rockies on February 8, 2010; he was subsequently assigned to their Double-A affiliate, the Tulsa Drillers. In 81 appearances for Tulsa, Sardinha batted .299/.415/.526 with 10 home runs, 50 RBI, and eight stolen bases.

Sardinha made 82 appearances for Double-A Tulsa during the 2011 campaign, slashing .302/.399/.469 with 10 home runs, 31 RBI, and seven stolen bases. He elected free agency following the season on November 2, 2011.

== Personal ==
He has two brothers (Dane and Duke) who also have played professional baseball. While his brothers were named after famous surfers, Bronson was named after actor Charles Bronson.

For his unique (middle) name, Sardinha was a part of the first MiLB.com Minors Moniker Madness, held in 2007. He reached the Final Four out of the Icicle Reeder Bracket, last beating Ari Kafka before falling to Will Startup, the 2008 winner.

Sardinha runs a company for children called Target Hitting.

=== Legal issues ===
In November 2015, Sardinha was arrested in Waipio, Hawaii and charged with fleeing the scene of an accident, assaulting a police officer and resisting arrest after headbutting a police officer. He subsequently pleaded no contest to the charge that he fled the scene. A Hawaii state circuit court initially dismissed the assault charges before being reversed by the Hawaii Intermediate Court of Appeals (ICA). Sardinha appealed the ICA decision to the Supreme Court of Hawaii and oral arguments were heard on July 15, 2021.

At the time of his November 2015 arrest, there was a bench warrant for his arrest for failure to appear on a misdemeanor harassment case. In March 2016, he was granted an adjournment in contemplation of dismissal of the harassment charge on the condition that he complete 29 hours of community service.

In July 2021, Sardinha was arrested in Kapolei, Hawaii and charged with driving under the influence.
