= Ryan Madson =

American baseball player (born 1980)

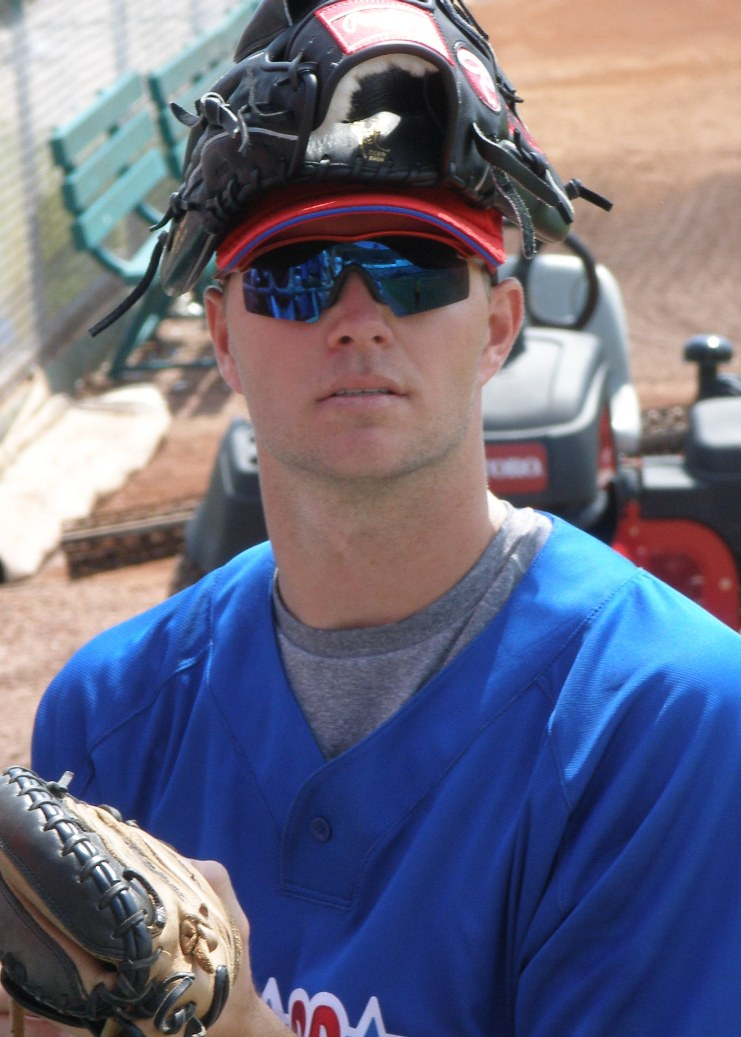
- Madson with the Philadelphia Phillies in 2008
- Pitcher
- Born: August 28, 1980 (age 46); Long Beach, California, U.S.
- Batted: Left Threw: Right

MLB debut
- September 27, 2003, for the Philadelphia Phillies

Last MLB appearance
- September 29, 2018, for the Los Angeles Dodgers

MLB statistics
- Win–loss record: 61–48
- Earned run average: 3.48
- Strikeouts: 775
- Saves: 91
- Stats at Baseball Reference

Teams
- Philadelphia Phillies (2003–2011); Kansas City Royals (2015); Oakland Athletics (2016–2017); Washington Nationals (2017–2018); Los Angeles Dodgers (2018)

Career highlights and awards
- 2× World Series champion (2008, 2015)

Ryan Michael Madson (born August 28, 1980) is an American former professional baseball pitcher. He played in Major League Baseball (MLB) for the Philadelphia Phillies, Kansas City Royals, Oakland Athletics, Washington Nationals, and Los Angeles Dodgers. Madson won World Series championships with the Phillies in 2008 and the Royals in 2015. He is third all-time in postseason pitching appearances, behind only Mariano Rivera and Kenley Jansen.

Madson throws three types of fastballs. His four-seamer and sinker both average 95 miles per hour. He also throws a cut fastball that averages 93 mph, and a circle changeup around 85 mph.

== Early life ==
Madson graduated from Valley View High School in 1998. He committed to play college baseball for USC.

== Professional career ==
=== Philadelphia Phillies (2003–2011) ===
The Philadelphia Phillies selected Madson in the ninth round (254th overall) of the 1998 Major League Baseball draft. He made his major league debut in 2003. In 2005, he finished with a 4.14 earned run average in 87 innings. The Phillies converted him back to a starting pitcher, the role he held throughout his minor league career in 2006.

By 2008 Madson had become part of the "bridge to Lidge (closer Brad Lidge)", developing into an outstanding set-up man. With a devastating changeup, Madson found increased velocity, hitting as high as 97 miles per hour in the NLCS. Madson earned his first playoff victory when the Phillies defeated the Los Angeles Dodgers in Game 4 of the 2008 NLCS. He pitched 1 2/3 innings, striking out one while allowing one hit and one walk.

When Brad Lidge was placed on the disabled list on June 9, 2009, Ryan Madson was the Phillies' choice for interim closer. Madson got his first save in his new role on June 10, 2009, against the New York Mets.

In Game 6 of the 2010 National League Championship Series, Madson was the losing pitcher when he gave up a solo home run to Juan Uribe in the eighth inning of a 3–2 loss to the San Francisco Giants.

Madson began the 2011 season once again as the Phillies' main set-up reliever. However, with Lidge and José Contreras on the disabled list in May 2011, Madson was chosen to close for the Phillies. as of August 21, 2011, Madson converted 23 saves in 25 opportunities and retained the closer role even after Lidge returned from the DL in July. Madson finished the season with 32 saves, 62 strikeouts, and an ERA of 2.37.

A free agent, Madson was close to negotiating a four-year, $44 million contract to remain with the Phillies, but Phillies general manager Rubén Amaro, Jr. reneged on the verbal agreement and instead signed Jonathan Papelbon to a four-year $50 million deal to replace Madson as the team's closer.

=== Injuries and initial retirement ===
During the 2011–12 offseason, Madson agreed to a one-year $8.5 million contract with the Cincinnati Reds. Before the end of spring training, Madson had a torn ligament in his right elbow, requiring Tommy John surgery, and missed the entire 2012 season. He never pitched for the Reds, as he declined his option on October 31 and became a free agent.

On November 28, 2012, Madson agreed to a one-year deal with the Los Angeles Angels of Anaheim. He began the 2013 season on the 15-day disabled list as he attempted to recover from the Tommy John surgery. Later in the season, the Angels transferred Madson to the 60-day disabled list. He was released on August 5 without appearing in a game.

Madson tried out with several teams in January 2014 but received no minor league deals from them, so he retired.

=== Kansas City Royals (2015) ===
Madson had become a youth baseball coach in California after his retirement, and in 2014, he received a call from Kansas City Royals executive Jim Fregosi Jr., asking Madson to tutor a high school pitcher. Working with the student inspired Madson to return to MLB, and he contacted Fregosi again that winter. On January 4, 2015, the Royals signed Madson to a minor league contract that included an invitation to spring training. Madson was the last player added to the Royals' 25-man roster, beating out Brian Flynn for the final bullpen position in a decision that manager Ned Yost called "the hardest ... I think I've ever had to make". He made his first major league appearance in over three years on April 6, 2015, pitching a scoreless ninth inning in the Royals' 10-1 Opening Day defeat of the Chicago White Sox. By the end of May, Madson had become a staple of Kansas City's strong bullpen, with a 1.74 ERA and 21 strikeouts in 20 1/3 innings over 18 appearances. With Wade Davis and Greg Holland unavailable, Madson earned the first save of this new stage of his career on August 9, holding the White Sox scoreless in the ninth inning for a 5-4 victory. By the end of the month, Madson began to experience fatigue and "dead arm", and he was put on rest in order to be ready for a postseason push.

In Game 4 of the 2015 ALDS against the Houston Astros, Madson gave up two home runs which put the Royals behind 6–2 with six outs until elimination, however, the Royals rallied to win the game and eventually the series. In Game 6 of the 2015 ALCS against the Toronto Blue Jays, Madson surrendered a game-tying two run homer to José Bautista, but the Royals scored the game winning run in the bottom of the same inning to win the game and the series.

Madson bounced back in the 2015 World Series against the New York Mets, in which Madson pitched 3 scoreless innings and was the winner of Game 4. The Royals would go on to win the series in 5 games.

=== Oakland Athletics (2016–2017) ===
On December 11, 2015, Madson signed a three-year, $22 million contract with the Oakland Athletics. In his first season, Madson was given the closer job while lefty Sean Doolittle recovered from injury. Madson saved 30 games, and despite blowing 7 saves, he finished with a 3.62 ERA in 63 games. In 2017, Madson was relieved of the closer role and was placed as the setup man. Through 40 games, he had a 2.06 ERA while improving his K/9 from 2016.

=== Washington Nationals (2017–2018) ===
On July 16, 2017, Madson and Doolittle were traded to the Washington Nationals for Blake Treinen, Sheldon Neuse, and Jesús Luzardo. Madson drew criticism from some when on August 4, 2018, he hit Reds star first baseman Joey Votto on the knee with a 96 mph fastball on the first pitch, possibly in retaliation for an accidental hit by pitch of Nationals star Bryce Harper. Votto, who yelled at Madson in anger over the pitch, ended up going on the DL.

=== Los Angeles Dodgers (2018) ===
On August 31, 2018, Madson was traded to the Los Angeles Dodgers for minor league pitcher Andrew Istler. In 9 games for the Dodgers, he struggled to a 6.48 ERA with 13 strikeouts across 8 1/3 innings pitched. Madson was the winning pitcher in Game 7 of the 2018 NLCS. Despite this; Madson's pitching was widely attributed to the Dodgers' collapse against the Boston Red Sox during the World Series. In Game 2, the Dodgers pulled ahead to a 2-1 lead following the fourth inning. Madson would later surrender 3 runs to cost the Dodgers the game. Madson was later subject to further criticism during Game 4 when Dodgers' manager Dave Roberts controversially pulled pitcher Rich Hill during the top of the 7th inning with one runner on base as the Dodgers led 4-0. The decision which was criticized by several (including then-current President Donald Trump) particularly when Red Sox' batter Mitch Moreland hit a three-run pinch-hit home run off of Madson to make it a one-run game. Madson later set a new World Series record by allowing seven inherited runners to score in the series. The Dodgers declined to renew Madson's contract following the 2018 postseason; culminating in his retirement shortly afterwards.

Madson retired with the second most pitching appearances in postseason history, behind only Mariano Rivera (Madson has since been surpassed by Kenley Jansen). Madson finished his career with 57 postseason appearances, compiling a 6-1 record and a 2.73 playoff ERA.

== Personal life ==
Madson is divorced from his wife of 20 years, Sarah, with whom he has five children.

Since his Tommy John surgery, at the suggestion of his Anaheim Angels teammates, Madson has trained with EVO Ultrafit in Phoenix, Arizona, and carries around a POV Sport, an electrical modality, with him at all times during the season.

Madson's uncle, Steve Barr, played in the major leagues from 1974 to 1976 for the Boston Red Sox and Texas Rangers.

Preceded by N/A	Steve Carlton Most Valuable Pitcher; 2004	Succeeded by Billy Wagner
