= Dane Sardinha =

American baseball player (born 1979)

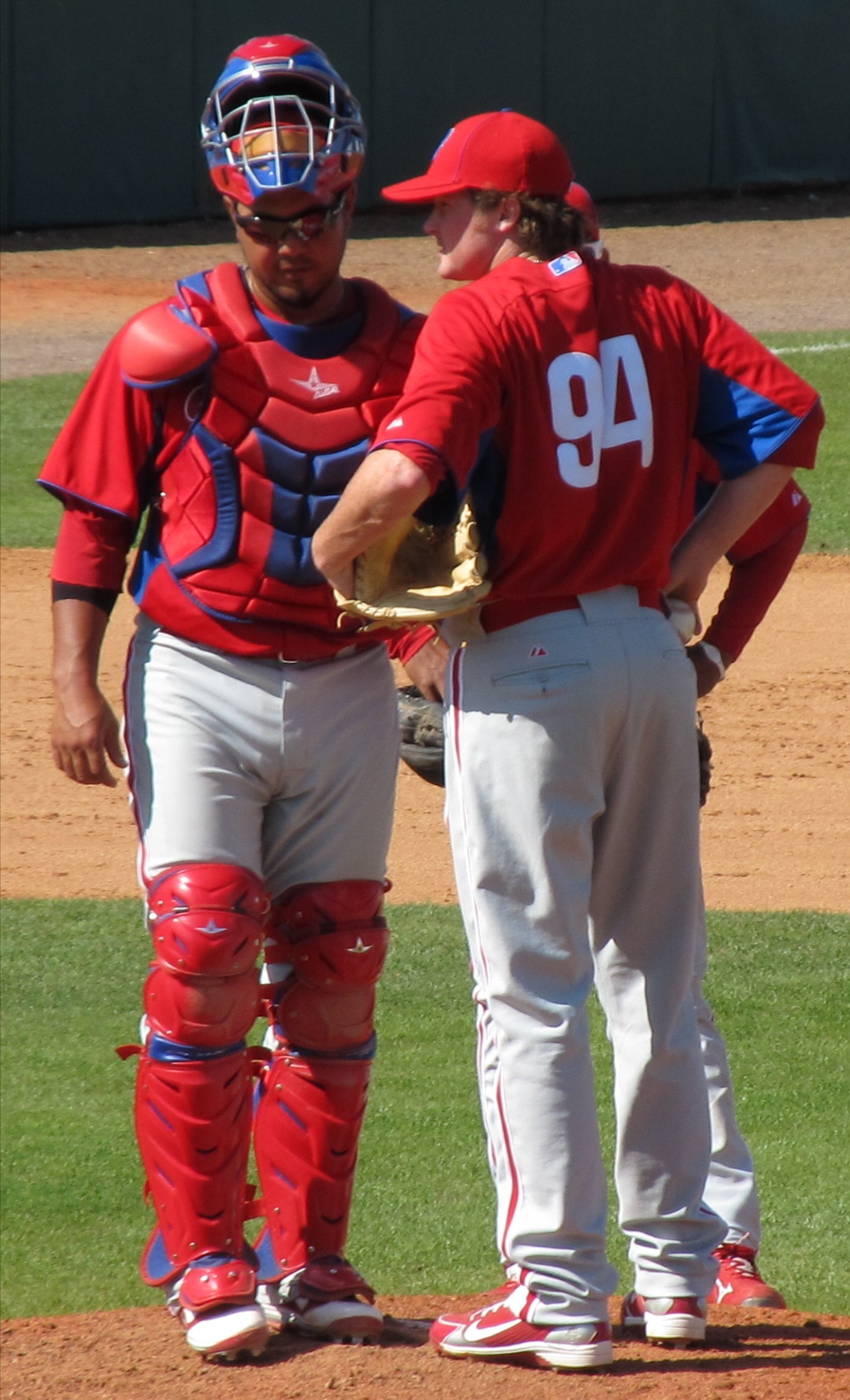
- Sardinha (left) with pitcher Tyson Brummett in 2011 Spring Training
- Catcher
- Born: April 8, 1979 (age 47); Honolulu, Hawaii, U.S.
- Batted: Right Threw: Right

MLB debut
- September 6, 2003, for the Cincinnati Reds

Last MLB appearance
- June 15, 2011, for the Philadelphia Phillies

MLB statistics
- Batting average: .166
- Home runs: 3
- Runs batted in: 15
- Stats at Baseball Reference

Teams
- Cincinnati Reds (2003, 2005); Detroit Tigers (2008–2009); Philadelphia Phillies (2010–2011)
Medals
Men's baseball
Representing United States
World Junior Baseball Championship
Bronze medal – third place	1996 Sancti Spíritus	Team

Dane Kealoha A. A. Sardinha (born April 8, 1979) is an American former professional baseball catcher. He played in Major League Baseball (MLB) for the Cincinnati Reds, Detroit Tigers, and Philadelphia Phillies between 2003 and 2011.

== Amateur career ==
A native of Honolulu, Hawaii, Sardinha was a high school standout at Kamehameha Schools; prior to his senior year, USA Today named him a "Super 25 preseason selection," while Baseball America named him a third-team All-American. Fresno State University and Pepperdine University recruited him, and the Kansas City Royals selected him in the second round (59th pick overall) of the 1997 MLB draft, but Sardinha did not sign. Then one of the most sought-after prospects in the country, he demanded a signing bonus between $1 million and $1.5 million on the advice of agent Scott Boras, but the Royals topped out at $750,000.

Sardinha attended Pepperdine from 1997 to 2000. In 1999, as a sophomore, Sardinha batted .365 with 15 home runs and 63 RBI. Baseball America selected him as a Third Team College All American catcher and he was also a West Coast Conference All-Star. After the 1999 season, he played collegiate summer baseball with the Cotuit Kettleers of the Cape Cod Baseball League. In 2000, his junior season he batted .353 with 17 home runs and 72 RBIs. Baseball America selected him as a First Team College All American catcher, he was the West Coast Conference Player of the Year and, again, a West Coast Conference All-Star catcher.

== Professional career ==
=== Cincinnati Reds ===
Sardinha was selected by the Cincinnati Reds in the 2nd round (46th overall) of the 2000 MLB draft. In lieu of a bonus the Reds signed Sardinha to a six-year contract with a guaranteed payout, regardless of whether he made it to the majors. As part of the deal the Reds placed Sardinha on the 40-man roster.

Because of his late signing, Sardinha sat out the remainder of the 2000 season. In 2001, Baseball America rated Sardinha as the best Reds catching prospect, the 4th best overall prospect in the Reds organization, and 74th overall. He began his professional career in 2001, playing for the High-A Mudville Nine. Playing in 109 games, he batted .235 with 9 home runs. Though he struggled offensively, Sardinha had a good season defensively, throwing out 38% of baserunners attempting to steal, second best in the California League.

Sardinha advanced to the Double-A Chattanooga Lookouts in 2002. He was a selection for the Southern League All-Star Game and batted .206 with 4 home runs for the season. Despite a poor season offensively, he had another good season defensively, again throwing out 38% of baserunners attempting to steal. Looking to improve the offense side of his game the Reds sent Sardinha to the Arizona Fall League, where he went on an offensive tear with the Scottsdale Scorpions.

In 2003, Sardinha missed the first month and a half of the season due to a torn lateral collateral ligament in his left knee. He played the entire minor league season at Double-A again, batting .256 with 3 home runs in 72 games. Taken off the roster on July 30, Sardinha hit .315 for the remainder of the season and was called up to the Reds on September 1, when Major League rosters expanded. On September 6, 2003, he made his Major League debut in a game against the St. Louis Cardinals. Coming into the game as a pinch hitter for an injured Jason LaRue, he batted 0–2 with a strikeout and caught the final four innings of the game. It was his only game of the 2003 season. On October 10, 2003, he was taken off the roster and accepted an assignment to Double-A.

Sardinha spent his first full season at the Triple-A level in 2004, playing for the Louisville Bats. As the Bats lone representative at the All-Star game, he played in 89 games, batting .262 with 9 home runs. On November 19, 2004, his contract was purchased by the Reds again.

Sardinha had a strong spring training in 2005, batting .353 with one home run in 10 games but did not make the opening day roster. Sardinha spent the majority of the season at Triple-A and played in 86 games, batting .224 with 10 home runs. From June 12 to June 14, Sardinha was called up to the Reds when Jason LaRue was on the bereavement list. On June 14, he made his first career start against the Boston Red Sox, going 0–3 with one strikeout. On August 8, Sardinha suffered a sprained medial collateral ligament in his right knee, ending his 2005 season.

On April 1, 2006, Sardinha was designated for assignment and was later outrighted to Triple-A on April 5. Sardinha spent another season for the Bats, batting .175 with two home runs in 71 games. His .175 batting average was a career low. After the season, he became a minor league free agent.

=== Detroit Tigers ===
On December 15, 2006, the Detroit Tigers signed Sardinha to a minor league contract with an invitation to spring training. Sardinha played the entire 2007 season for the Triple-A Toledo Mud Hens, appearing in 117 games with a batting average of .202 with 10 home runs. In November 2007, the Tigers re-signed him to a minor league contract with an invitation to spring training.

With two catchers on the Tigers active roster, Sardinha began the 2008 season in Triple-A Toledo. The Tigers purchased his contract on June 25 to replace the injured Brandon Inge. On June 29, 2008, against the Colorado Rockies, Sardinha got his first career Major League hit, a two-RBI triple off pitcher Matt Herges. Sardinha returned to Toledo once Inge returned from the disabled list, but was recalled to the Tigers when Iván Rodríguez was traded to the New York Yankees.

Sardinha became a free agent on October 30, 2008, and re-signed with the Tigers in November. Sardinha spent part of the first half of the season with Detroit as the backup catcher, but after hitting .097 over 12 games was designated for assignment to make room for rookie pitcher Alfredo Figaro. In October 2009, Sardinha was granted free agency.

=== Philadelphia Phillies ===
On January 7, 2010, Sardinha signed a minor-league contract with an invitation to spring training with the Philadelphia Phillies. After beginning the season with the Lehigh Valley IronPigs, he was called up to the Phillies to replace Scott Mathieson before a game with the Minnesota Twins on June 19. On June 24, Sardinha hit his first Major League home run against Cleveland Indians reliever Héctor Ambriz. On June 30, he hit his second home run against his former team, the Cincinnati Reds. On July 10, he was designated for assignment as Carlos Ruiz was activated from the disabled list.

The Phillies purchased his contract on April 29, 2011. He was outrighted to Triple-A on June 24, after making 43 plate appearances for Philadelphia and recording a .219 batting average. He elected free agency on October 10.

=== Baltimore Orioles ===
Sardinha signed a minor league contract with the Baltimore Orioles on February 8, 2012. However, he failed his physical examination, nullifying the deal.

=== Hawaii Stars ===
Sardinha signed with the independent Hawaii Stars of the Pacific Association for 2013.

== Personal life ==
Sardinha has two younger brothers, both baseball players. Duke was an infielder in the Colorado Rockies organization and his youngest, Bronson, was an outfielder with the New York Yankees in 2007.
