= Michael Stutes =

American baseball player (born 1986)

- Pitcher
- Born: September 4, 1986 (age 40); Metairie, Louisiana, U.S.
- Batted: Right Threw: Right

MLB debut
- April 25, 2011, for the Philadelphia Phillies

Last MLB appearance
- September 28, 2013, for the Philadelphia Phillies

MLB statistics
- Win–loss record: 9–3
- Earned run average: 4.01
- Strikeouts: 72
- Stats at Baseball Reference

Teams
- Philadelphia Phillies (2011–2013)

Michael Christopher Stutes (born September 4, 1986) is an American former professional baseball pitcher who played for the Philadelphia Phillies from 2011 to 2013.

== Amateur career ==
Stutes is a graduate of Lake Oswego High School in 2004, where he attended high school at the same time as basketball player Kevin Love of the Cleveland Cavaliers (who graduated three years later). He attended Oregon State University, where he played for the Beavers team. In 2005, he played collegiate summer baseball in the Cape Cod Baseball League for the Yarmouth-Dennis Red Sox.

Stutes was drafted by the Phillies in the 11th round of the 2008 Major League Baseball draft. Previously, he had been drafted by the Los Angeles Dodgers in the 32nd round of the 2004 draft, and the St. Louis Cardinals in the ninth round of the 2007 draft, but did not sign either time.

== Professional career ==
=== 2011 ===
Stutes was promoted to the majors for the first time after José Contreras was placed on the 15-day DL on April 25, 2011. He made his debut that day, recording one perfect inning of relief against the Arizona Diamondbacks, as well as recording his first major league strikeout, against Kelly Johnson. Stutes stayed in the majors for the rest of the season, including pitching in Game 1 of the 2011 National League Division Series against the St. Louis Cardinals. In 57 games in 2011, he went 6-2 with a 3.63 ERA and 13 holds, striking out 58 in 62 innings.

=== 2012 ===
After just 5.2 innings pitched in the 2012 season, Stutes was placed on the 15-Day disabled list with right shoulder inflammation. Stutes was then shut down for the season after arthroscopic surgery on the shoulder.

=== 2013 ===
Stutes started the season with the Lehigh Valley IronPigs, the Phillies Triple-A affiliate, before being called up to the Phillies on May 24. He pitched with Philadelphia for a month before being placed on the disabled list on June 23 with biceps tendinitis. At the very end of the season, on September 20, Stutes was activated off the disabled list, and made two more appearances. In 16 games with the Phillies in 2013, he went 3-1 with a 4.58 ERA and three holds, striking out nine in 17.2 innings.

=== 2014 ===
On March 11, 2014, Stutes was sent outright to Triple-A Lehigh Valley IronPigs. He was released on March 26.
