= 2010 Philadelphia Phillies season =

Major League Baseball season

2010 Philadelphia Phillies
- National League East champions
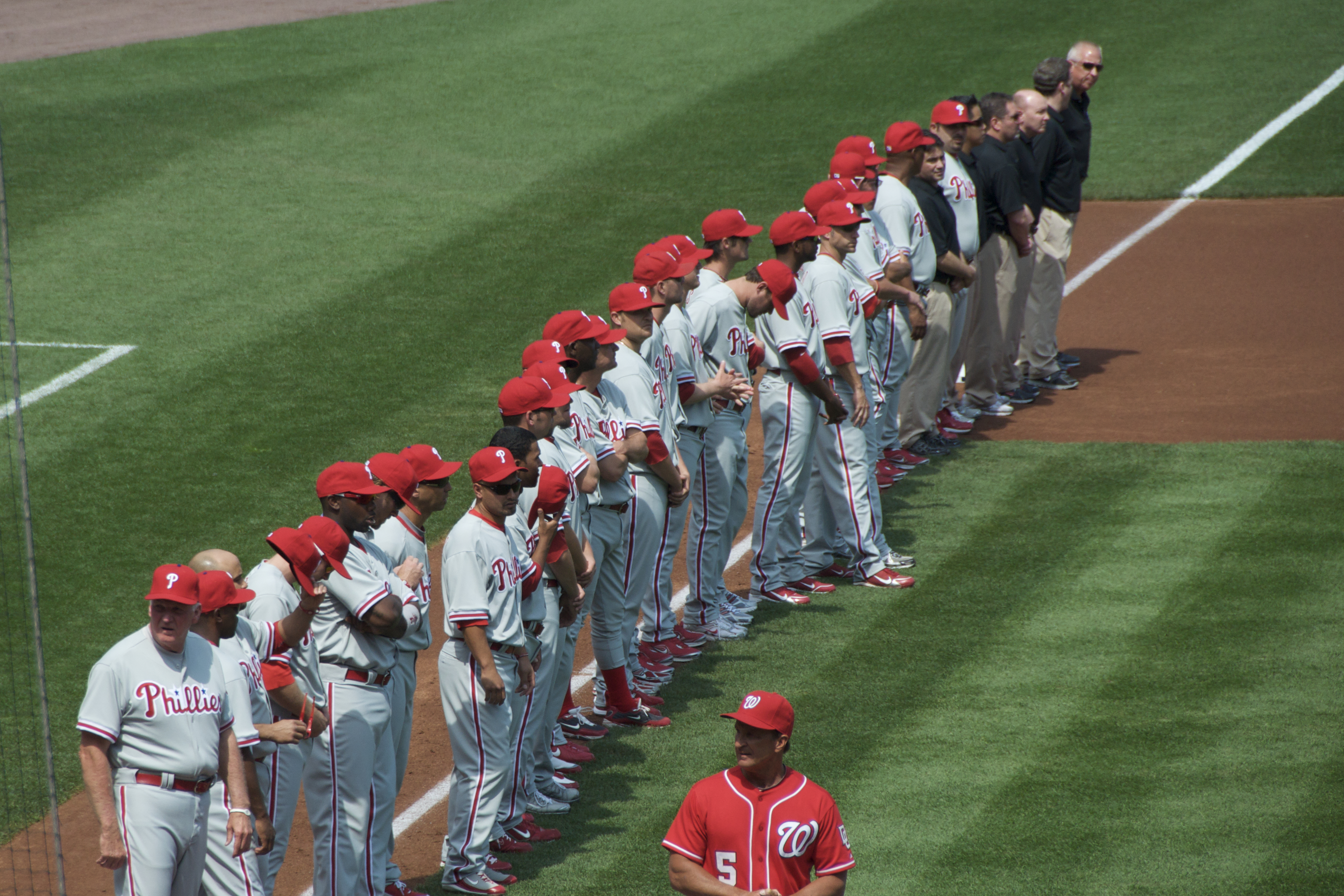
- The 2010 Phillies on the field at Nationals Park on Opening Day
- League: National League
- Division: East
- Ballpark: Citizens Bank Park
- City: Philadelphia, Pennsylvania
- Record: 97–65 (.599)
- Divisional place: 1st
- Owners: Bill Giles, David Montgomery, et al.
- General managers: Rubén Amaro Jr.
- Managers: Charlie Manuel
- Television: Comcast SportsNet Philadelphia, Comcast Network Philadelphia, WPHL-TV (My PHL 17)
- Radio: WPHT 1210 AM (English), WUBA 1480 AM (Spanish), Phillies Radio Network

The Philadelphia Phillies' 2010 season was the 128th season in the history of the franchise. As the two-time defending National League champion—having appeared in the 2008 and 2009 World Series—the Phillies won their fourth consecutive National League East championship, and also finished with the best record in baseball. After sweeping the Cincinnati Reds in the NLDS, however, the team lost to the San Francisco Giants in the NLCS.

== Offseason ==
The Phillies announced, following the 2009 World Series, that they would pick up their 1-year, $9 million option on starting pitcher Cliff Lee, who posted a 4–0 record in the previous postseason. General manager Rubén Amaro Jr. informed pitcher Brett Myers, who had started and relieved in 2009 and sustained several injuries, that the Phillies would not pursue him for a new contract if he filed for free agency. Myers had started the last three opening days for the Phillies. Starting pitcher Pedro Martínez and infielder Miguel Cairo also filed for free agency on November 6, the first possible date. Philadelphia also informed third baseman Pedro Feliz that they declined to pick up his option for the 2010 season, which would have retained him for $5.5 million. The Phillies signed free-agent catcher Brian Schneider to replace Paul Bako behind Carlos Ruiz on the depth chart, and replaced Feliz at third base with Plácido Polanco, who played second base for Philadelphia from 2002 to 2005, and was a Gold Glove-winning second baseman for the prior two seasons with the Detroit Tigers. Polanco had previously played third base in college, when playing with the St. Louis Cardinals, and in Philadelphia when David Bell was injured and Chase Utley took over at second base.

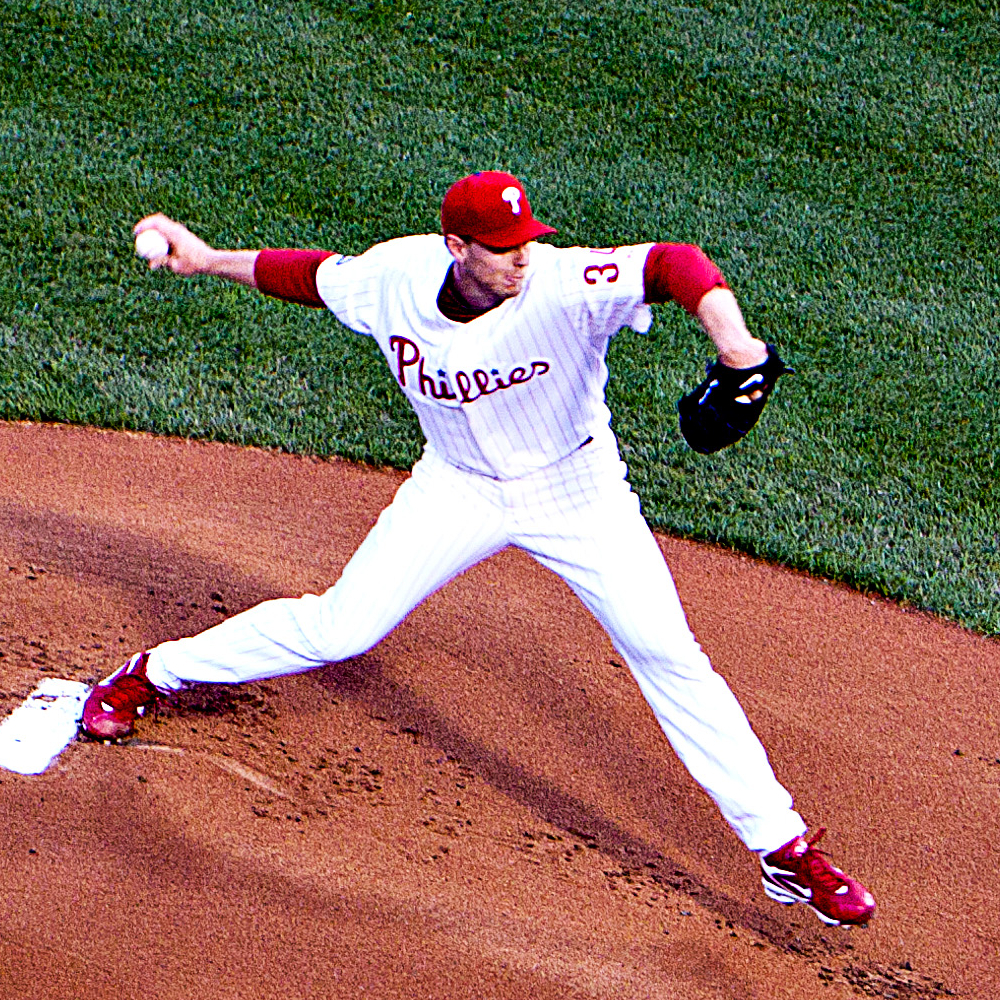
Roy Halladay signed a three-year extension after being traded to Philadelphia.

With Lee under contract for one year, the Phillies traded his rights to the Seattle Mariners, from whom they received three prospects, including Tyson Gillies and Phillippe Aumont. In a related deal, the Phillies traded three prospects to the Toronto Blue Jays for the rights to right-handed starting pitcher Roy Halladay, as well as $6 million cash to cover the difference between the two aces' salaries. The trade for Halladay included a 3-year, $60 million contract extension through 2013 with an option for a 4th season. The trade was the "first of its kind" in the history of the league, the only deal wherein two past winners of the Cy Young Award changed hands in related transactions.

To complete their bench, the Phillies signed utility infielder Juan Castro to a one-year contract to replace Eric Bruntlett, and inked a two-year deal with pinch-hitter and first baseman Ross Gload, who replaced Matt Stairs. In the bullpen, the Phillies signed right-handed relief pitcher Danys Báez to a two-year contract, and agreed to a one-year deal with right-handed starter and long reliever José Contreras. Amaro announced that all of the coaches from the 2009 season had also been invited to return.

== Spring training ==
The Phillies opened their 2010 Grapefruit League play against the New York Yankees, defeating them 3–2; Halladay pitched two innings in the opener against CC Sabathia, striking out three and throwing 21 of 24 pitches for strikes. In total, the Phillies went 13–12 in spring training, where a position battle occurred for the fifth spot in the starting rotation between left-handed veteran Jamie Moyer and young right-hander Kyle Kendrick. The team announced on March 30 that Moyer had won the fifth position based on his Grapefruit League performance (1–0, 0.77 earned run average (ERA) in 11 2/3 innings). However, Kendrick's performance (0–1, 1.66 ERA in 21 2/3 innings) also moved him into the rotation after an oblique injury to third starter Joe Blanton. Closer Brad Lidge and left-handed specialist J. C. Romero also ended spring training on the disabled list after offseason surgeries.

== Regular season ==
=== April ===
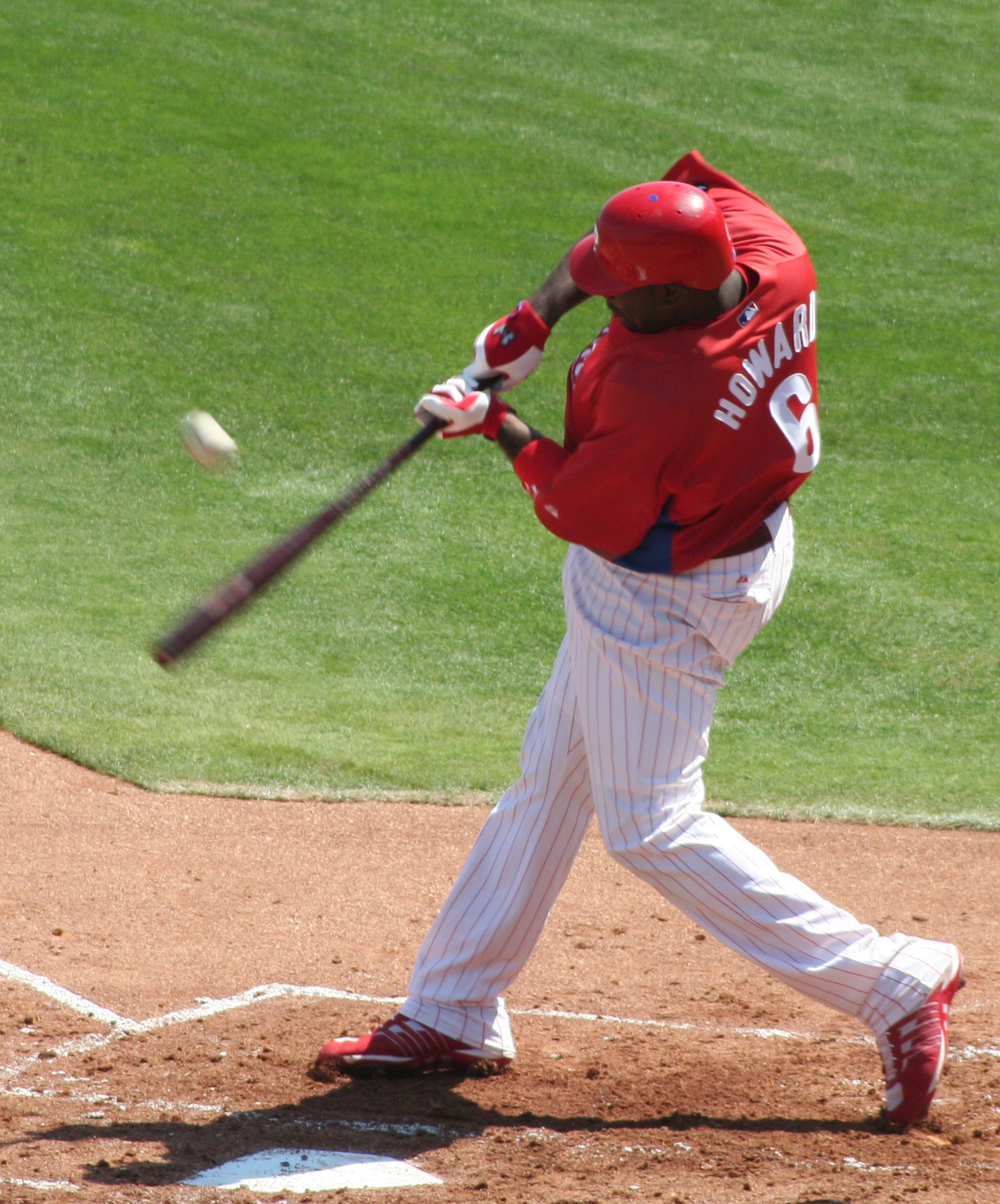
Ryan Howard passed Greg Luzinski to take sole possession of fifth place on the franchise's home run list on April 7.

The Phillies opened the season on the road for the first time since the opening of Citizens Bank Park in 2004; they defeated the Washington Nationals in their first game of the season, 11–1, behind seven innings from Roy Halladay and a grand slam from Plácido Polanco. Ryan Howard moved into a tie for fifth place on the franchise's all-time home run list by hitting his 223rd, matching Greg Luzinski's career total. He passed Luzinski the following day with a two-run home run to center field off of Jason Marquis in Philadelphia's 8–4 victory, sealing the team's first 2–0 start since the 2003 season. They did not complete the sweep, however, as the Nationals won the third game of the series, 6–5, after newly acquired relief pitcher Nelson Figueroa allowed an RBI double to Ryan Zimmerman in the seventh inning. The Phillies took sole possession of first place by defeating the Houston Astros in the opener of their second series on April 9, defeating Brad Mills' new club, 8–0; Raúl Ibañez broke out of a spring slump by collecting three hits and a walk in four official at bats. Jamie Moyer's first start of the season resulted in the Phillies' fourth win, backed by another Howard home run; Philadelphia scored 41 runs in their first 5 games. A complete-game victory for Halladay in his second Phillies start sealed the series sweep for Philadelphia, as they defeated the Astros, 2–1, on April 11. Halladay notched both the 150th win and 50th complete game of his career. In the home opener against Washington, Jimmy Rollins was scratched from the starting lineup due to a calf strain—which later sent him to the disabled list—and Jayson Werth left the game in the fourth inning with a sore hip; however, the Phillies scored five runs in the fifth inning to come from behind and defeat the Nationals, giving Hamels his second victory of the season. Figueroa earned his first victory as a Phillie on April 14 when Philadelphia defeated Washington in the second game of the series, 14–7; their 7–1 start was the best to open a season since 1993, when they appeared in that year's World Series against the Toronto Blue Jays. The bullpen, however, allowed a 4–2 lead to turn into a 7–5 loss in the final game of the series; Danys Báez allowed three runs on home runs by Adam Dunn and Zimmerman to take the loss.

Opening the final series of the homestand against the Florida Marlins, manager Charlie Manuel switched starters Moyer and Halladay in the rotation to keep the latter on normal rest; Halladay responded by allowing two runs in eight innings in an 8–6 victory, supported by Chase Utley's fourth consecutive contest with a home run. The Marlins defeated the Phillies in the second game of the series, 5–1, as Moyer allowed five runs in the first inning and the Phillies' only run came on a late-game home run by Jayson Werth. The Marlins took the rubber game of the series with a 2–0 shutout despite eight innings of two-run baseball by Cole Hamels. Kyle Kendrick followed Hamels' performance with eight shutout innings on April 20, allowing four hits and walking two, but interim closer Ryan Madson allowed back-to-back home runs with two outs in the ninth inning to tie the game and José Contreras gave up another home run in the tenth, sealing the Phillies' third consecutive loss. The next night, Halladay posted the third straight strong performance by the Phillies' rotation, and played the role of stopper by holding the Braves scoreless on five hits to notch his second complete game of the season and the sixteenth shutout of his career. With the win, Halladay became the first pitcher of the season to reach a 4–0 record. The rotation's streak of innings without allowing an earned run extended to 23, as Moyer allowed two unearned runs in six innings; the Phillies won the game, 8–3, and the series, two games to one. The streak was broken, however, the following night, as Hamels allowed four home runs in the span of two innings, and the Phillies lost to the Arizona Diamondbacks in their first trip west, 7–4.

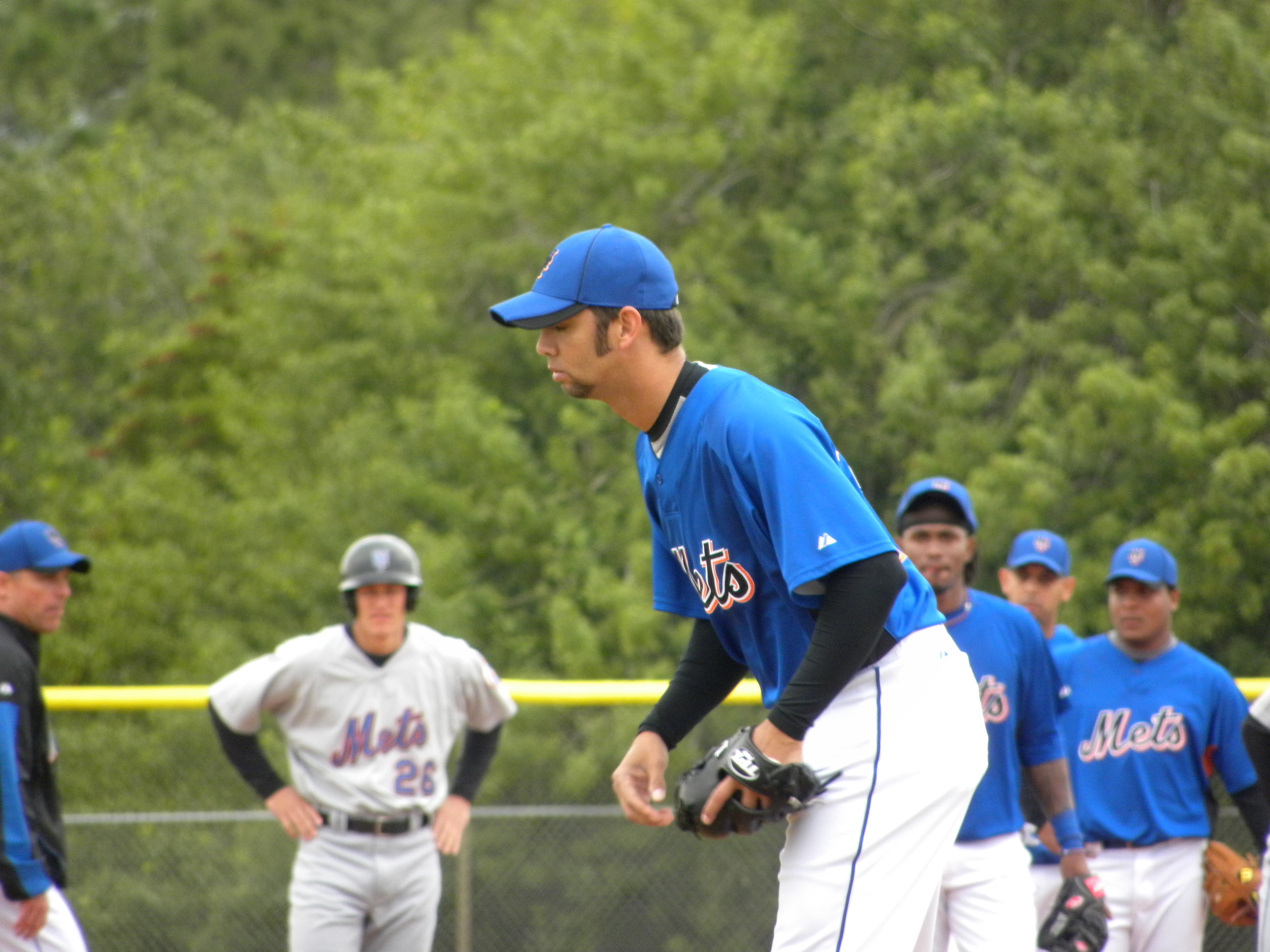
Relief pitcher Nelson Figueroa threw 100 pitches in a spot start against the Arizona Diamondbacks on April 24.

Figueroa made a spot start for the injured J. A. Happ in the second game against Arizona, throwing 100 pitches in 5 innings of work; Contreras earned his first win of the season in the 3–2 Phillies victory. However, the Phillies could not earn their fourth consecutive road series victory, as the Diamondbacks defeated Philadelphia, 8–6, after Arizona scored five runs in the fifth inning of the rubber game. Continuing play against the National League West, Halladay started against the San Francisco Giants, but lost his first decision of the season, 5–1, as the Phillies left 22 men on base. The offense fared no better in the second game of the series, ensuring the second straight series loss with a 6–2 defeat. The loss dropped the Phillies out of first place for the first time all season, ending a streak of 135 consecutive games at the top of the division dating back to May 29, 2009. They managed to avoid being swept for the first time by defeating the Giants in 11 innings on April 28, 7–6; starter Tim Lincecum, winner of the last two National League Cy Young Awards, allowed one run and struck out eleven Phillies through 8 1/3 innings, but a bases-loaded double by Werth against Brian Wilson tied the game in the bottom of the ninth inning and Wilson Valdez batted in the winning run in the eleventh. In the game, Utley became the 5th Phillies player in the last 20 years, and the 32nd in franchise history, to reach 1,000 career hits, with a single to right field. Philadelphia closed the month with their first game of the year against the division-rival New York Mets, losing 9–1 to finish with a 12–10 record in the opening month.

=== May ===
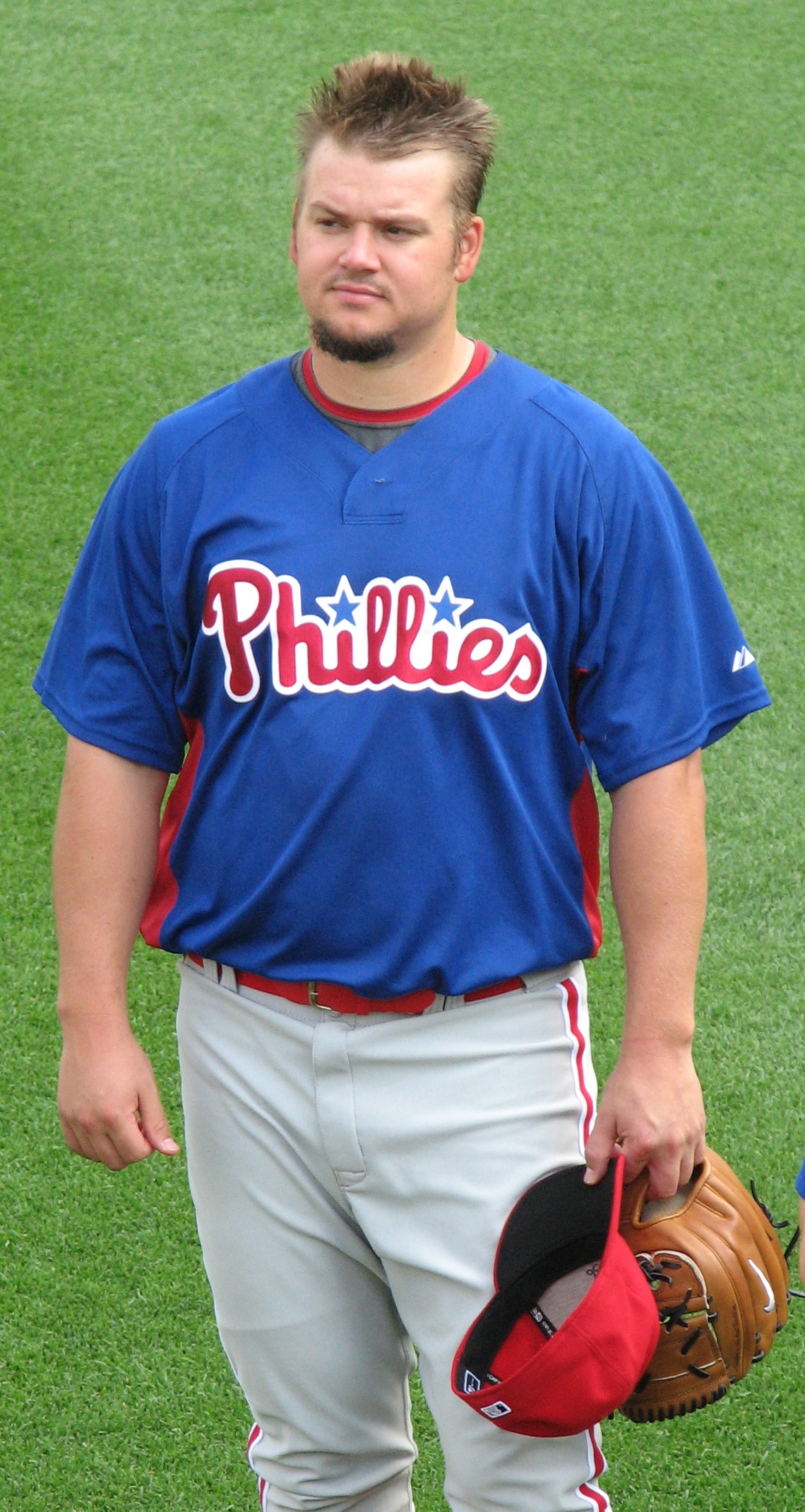
Joe Blanton returned to the Phillies' rotation on May 3.

Continuing the series with the Mets from the previous month, Halladay completed his second shutout of the season, striking out six batters in a 10–0 victory. The Phillies returned to first place in the division with an 11–5 victory in the series' final game, capped by a grand slam by Victorino; the 10 runs scored against Mets starter Johan Santana were the most allowed in a start in his career. Joe Blanton returned to the starting rotation for his first game of the season; though he allowed one run on seven hits in 6 2/3 innings before being relieved, the Phillies lost to the St. Louis Cardinals in their series opener, 6–3, after the bullpen allowed three inherited runners to score. Carlos Ruiz hit a walk-off home run in the bottom of the 10th inning to win the second game of the series for Philadelphia, after Hamels and Adam Wainwright battled to a stalemate, each throwing eight innings of one-run baseball. Home runs by Victorino and Polanco the following evening sealed a second straight victory for the Phillies behind seven scoreless innings from Kendrick. Every starter in the lineup got at least one hit in the final game of the series, save Halladay, who pitched seven innings and allowed two runs. The offense was paced by Werth and Ruiz, who each went 3-for-4 in the game. Werth later said that his three-run home run in the first inning was "big ups to Robin [Roberts]", the Hall of Fame Phillies pitcher who died that morning, and who shared Werth's hometown of Springfield, Illinois. Werth hit another three-run home run on May 7 against the Braves to back a two-hit, no-walk shutout by Moyer, who became the oldest pitcher in Major League Baseball history to throw a complete game without allowing a run. The Phillies lost the second game of the series, 4–1, as Blanton took his second consecutive loss since returning from the disabled list, but came back to win the series with a 5–3 victory in Sunday's contest; Victorino, Polanco, and Werth hit home runs, and Brad Lidge earned his first save of the 2010 campaign.

Playing at Coors Field to open the team's second trip to the National League West, the Phillies scored four runs in the ninth inning to win the series opener against the Colorado Rockies, 9–5. Victorino hit two triples, and Ruiz notched four hits, including a home run, in five at-bats, the highest single-game total of his career. After weather on May 11 forced a day-night doubleheader the following day, the Rockies defeated Philadelphia, 4–3, on a walk-off home run by Miguel Olivo; the second game was postponed again due to additional rain and snow. The Phillies lost Ruiz to a knee injury in the game, sent Lidge back to Philadelphia for tests on his right elbow, and were chastised before the game by Major League Baseball for potentially stealing signs. Next, the team traveled to Wisconsin to face off against the Milwaukee Brewers, taking the first game of the series, 9–5, from former Phillie Randy Wolf; Utley, Howard and Ibáñez each hit a home run in the contest, and Victorino batted in three runs. With Madson and Lidge both on the disabled list, Contreras assumed the closer's role and earned his first career save in a 10–6 Phillies victory on May 15. The team completed the sweep with a 4–2 victory on May 16 behind 6 2/3 innings and an RBI double from Hamels. A three-run home run from Werth and a late-inning grand slam from Howard gave the Phillies a 12–2 victory over the Pittsburgh Pirates on May 17, supporting a career-best eight-inning performance from Kendrick; the pair of batters drove in the 10 runs that were the difference in the final score. The two-game series against Pittsburgh ended in a split, however, as Halladay's two-run complete game on May 18 was overshadowed by six innings of one-run baseball pitched by Zach Duke, handing the Phillies their fourth loss of the month. The team lost consecutive games for the first time in May, as they fell to the Chicago Cubs the following day, 4–1, but notched a second consecutive series split when Ibáñez drove in the winning run in the eighth inning of the May 20 contest.

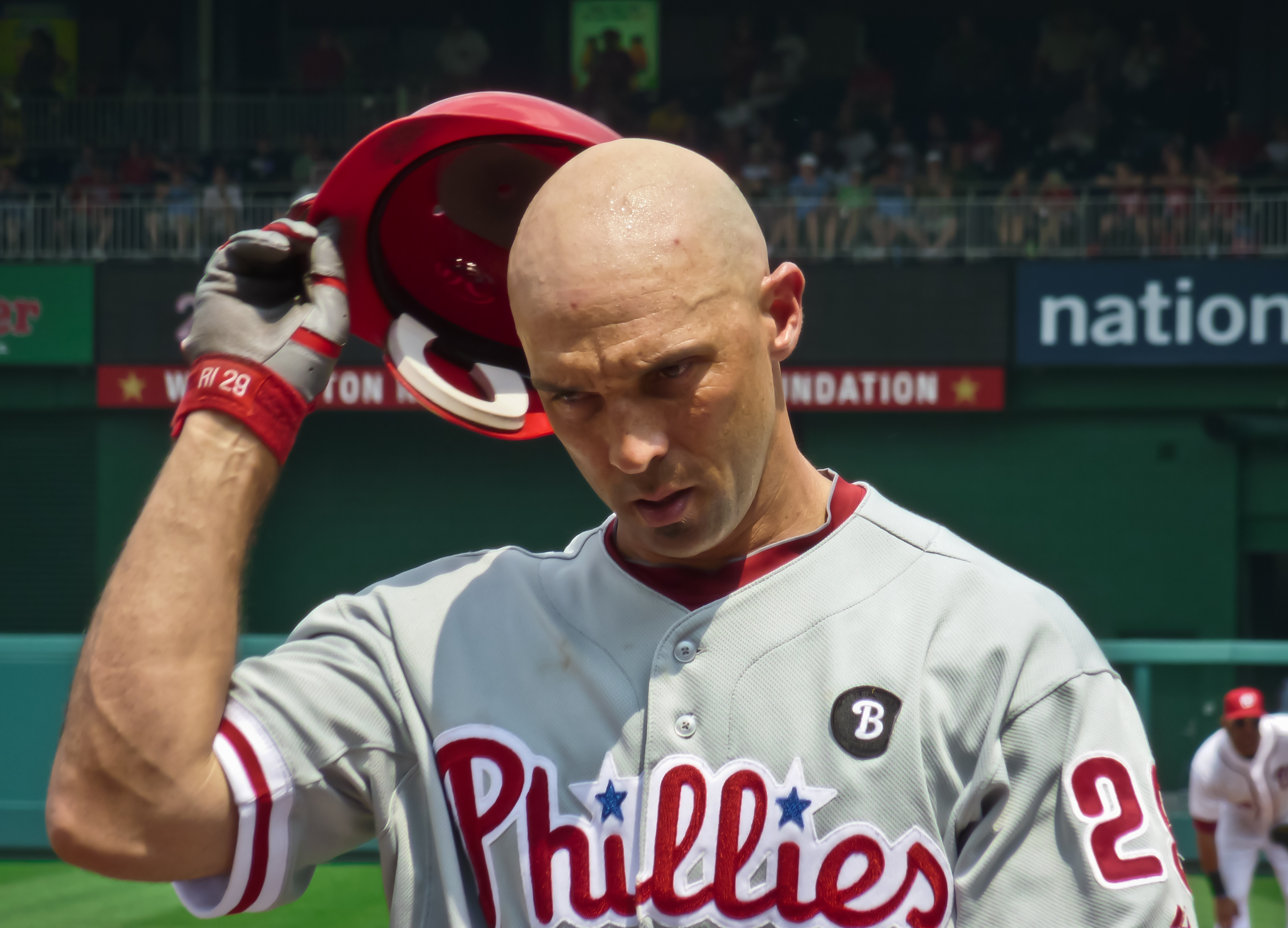
Raúl Ibañez broke the Phillies' 30-inning scoreless streak with an RBI triple on May 28, scoring Howard.

Philadelphia opened interleague play against the Boston Red Sox on May 21, defeating them, 5–1; J. C. Romero collected his second save of the season to close Hamels' fifth victory, and Werth hit a home run to the second deck in left field. Boston's Daisuke Matsuzaka nearly no-hit the Phillies in the second game until Juan Castro singled with two outs in the eighth inning; it was Philadelphia's only hit of the game, as they were defeated, 5–0. The Red Sox took the final game, 8–3, by scoring six earned runs against Halladay, his second consecutive loss and the most runs allowed in a start by the right-hander so far during the season. Traveling to New York for their second series against the Mets, the Phillies were shut out in consecutive games: 8–0 on May 25 by knuckleballer R. A. Dickey; and 5–0 on May 26 by Hisanori Takahashi. Philadelphia was held scoreless for 37 of 38 consecutive innings, with the only runs coming in the final inning of the last game against Boston, and increased that total to 46 of 47 after being shut out again in the final game of the series, 3–0; the Phillies became the first defending league champion in Major League Baseball history not to score a run in a three-game series. It was the first time Philadelphia was shut out in three consecutive games since 1983, the season that they lost to the Baltimore Orioles in the World Series. The streak ended at 30 consecutive innings (49 of 50) when the Phillies scored in the fourth inning of the May 28 contest to open the Memorial Day weekend series with Florida; they defeated the Marlins, 3–2, after taking their first lead in a game in a week. Philadelphia completed its second consecutive victory in a pitcher's duel between Halladay and Marlins ace Josh Johnson; Johnson allowed only an unearned run through seven innings, but Halladay pitched the 20th perfect game in major league history, and the second in franchise history (Jim Bunning), striking out 11 and retiring all 27 Florida batters in order. The tables were turned the following afternoon as the Marlins shut out the Phillies, 1–0, behind Aníbal Sánchez, and the month was finished with a 9–3 loss to Atlanta.

=== June ===
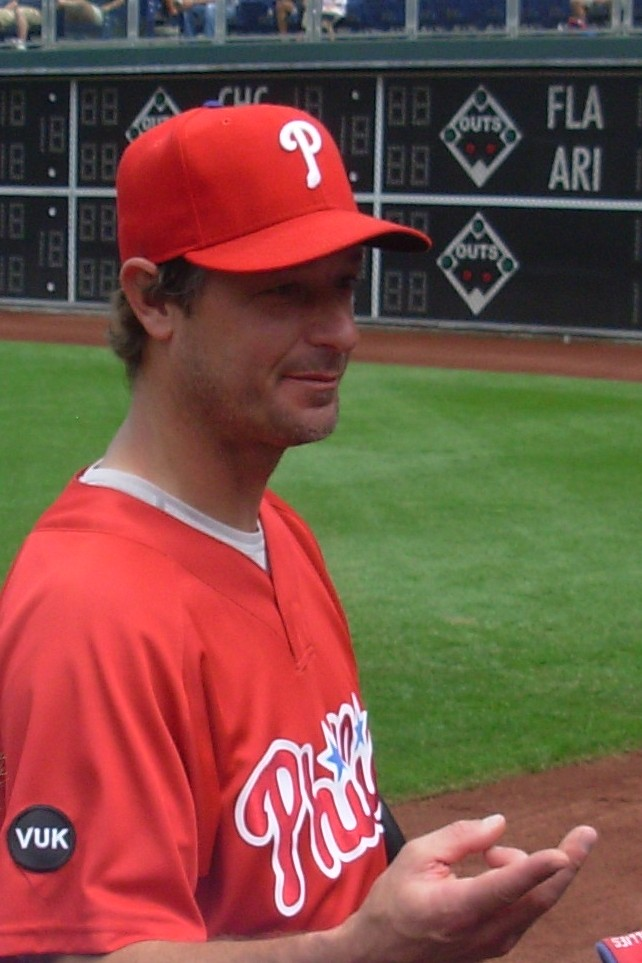
Jamie Moyer became the third pitcher in Major League Baseball history to win 100 games after turning 40.

Philadelphia opened the third month of the season by breaking a 68-inning streak in which no Phillie had hit a home run; Howard's two-run shot in the sixth inning was one of ten hits for the team, but the Braves defeated them, 7–3. The final game of the series did not bring the Phillies a win. Although Kendrick pitched seven innings—recording the three outs of the seventh on four pitches—and allowed only one run, the Braves scored their second run against Contreras in the eighth inning to win the game, 2–1; it was Atlanta's eighth consecutive victory. After a day off, the Phillies defeated the San Diego Padres in consecutive games in the Friars' only visit of the season to Philadelphia; Halladay won his eighth decision in a 3–2 victory on June 4, and Moyer followed by becoming the third pitcher to win 100 games after the age of 40 (Jack Quinn, Phil Niekro) in a complete-game win on June 5. After scoring five runs against Padres starter Kevin Correia in less than two innings in the third game, San Diego's bullpen pitched 8 1/3 scoreless frames as Philadelphia was defeated in extra innings, 6–5. After Hamels lost a potential no-hitter in the seventh inning on June 7, the Phillies settled for a split with the Padres as they lost, 3–1. The score seesawed back and forth in the first game of the next series with Florida. Ben Francisco made an error in the outfield and grounded into two double plays before batting in the winning run in the bottom of the eighth inning; the final score was 10–8. After the second scheduled game of the series was cancelled due to poor weather conditions, the Marlins won the final game, 2–0; Johnson and Halladay matched up for the first time since the latter's perfect game two weeks prior, and the former left as the victor after pitching eight scoreless innings.

In the second round of interleague play, the Phillies faced the Red Sox for the second time. In the first two games, the Phillies allowed 22 runs in 12–2 and 10–2 losses; Moyer and Blanton, as the starting pitchers, became the fourth set of pitchers in franchise history to allow eight or more earned runs in the first three innings of consecutive games, and the first pair since 1895. Philadelphia took the final game of the series to collect their second interleague win of the season, defeating Boston, 5–3, behind a four-run inning by the Phillie offense. In a rematch of both the 1950 World Series and the previous season's Fall Classic, the Phillies traveled north to face the New York Yankees for a three-game series beginning on June 16; they were defeated in the series opener, 8–3, although Halladay, who started the game, had been 18–6 with a 2.84 earned run average against the Yankees in his career. Howard and Werth hit the first back-to-back home runs on the season for the Phillies in the second game of the series to back Moyer's 275th career victory on the 24th anniversary of his first major league start and win, and Philadelphia took the rubber game, 7–1, to close out the series. In the series opener against the Minnesota Twins, Howard had four hits in four at-bats, finishing a single short of the cycle and pacing the Phillies offense with two solo home runs, a triple, and a double as Philadelphia won, 9–5. The offense continued in the second game, as the Phillies hit four home runs and entered the ninth inning leading 9–4, but Lidge blew his first save of the season to send the game to extra innings and the Twins won, 13–10, in the 11th frame. The Twins took the final game and the series victory on June 20 behind a complete game from Carl Pavano; although both pitchers finished the game with identical 8–6 records, it was Halladay's third consecutive loss.

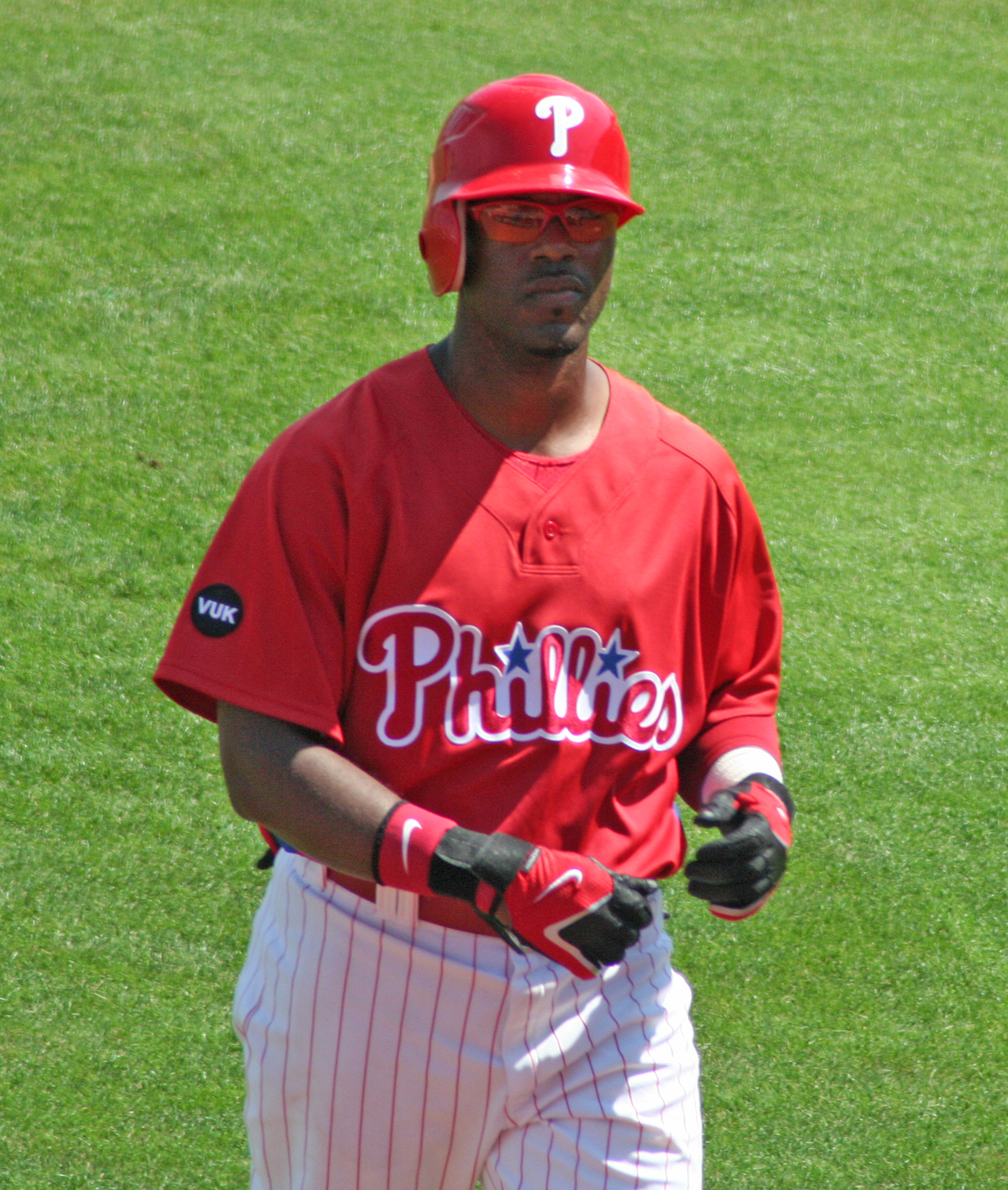
After being activated from the disabled list, Jimmy Rollins hit his first career walk-off home run in his second game back (June 23).

Philadelphia's slate of interleague games was finished with series against the Cleveland Indians and the Toronto Blue Jays. Although Moyer allowed his major league record-tying 505th career home run (tying the recently deceased Roberts), it was the only run, and one of two hits, he gave up to Cleveland in eight innings, and Lidge saved the 2–1 victory for the Phillies in the opener. After being tied 5–5 entering the ninth inning of the second game, the Indians scored in the top of the inning to take a 6–5 lead, but the recently reactivated Rollins hit his first career walk-off home run in the bottom of the ninth to win the game for Philadelphia, 7–6. The Phillies completed the series sweep with a 12–3 victory in which Blanton pitched 7 2/3 innings for his third win of the season; Polanco had four hits in five at-bats—Utley and Werth each added three—while catcher Dane Sardinha hit the first home run of his major league career.

The series with the Blue Jays was originally to have been played in Toronto and marked Halladay's first appearance in Rogers Centre since leaving the Blue Jays. However, on May 12, the Blue Jays announced that the series would be moved to Philadelphia, citing security and logistical concerns for the G-20 Summit. Thus, the Blue Jays batted last as the home team, and the designated hitter was used. Halladay faced off against his former club for the first time in the regular season, defeating Toronto, 9–0; the offense was paced by three hits and four runs batted in for Ross Gload, along with four walks from Rollins from the leadoff spot. The game marked the first time that the designated hitter had been used in a National League ballpark during the regular season; Howard was the first player to fill the role. Hamels allowed five runs in four innings in the second game of the series as the Jays defeated Philadelphia, 5–1, snapping their four-game win streak. However, the Phillies capitalized on four Toronto errors in the rubber game, taking an 11–2 victory and clinching a winning record in interleague play for the first time since the 2007 Phillies season. In a return to National League play, the Phillies closed June with a series at Great American Ball Park. They lost to the Cincinnati Reds in the series opener, 7–3, as Utley sprained his right thumb sliding into second base; the injury led the team to place him on the disabled list, along with Polanco, who had soreness in his elbow. Philadelphia took the second game of the series, 9–6, in extra innings after Lidge gave up a game-tying three-run home run in the bottom of the ninth inning, but lost the series after a 4–3 comeback win by Cincinnati to close the month. The Phillies finished the month with a 13–13 record.

=== July ===
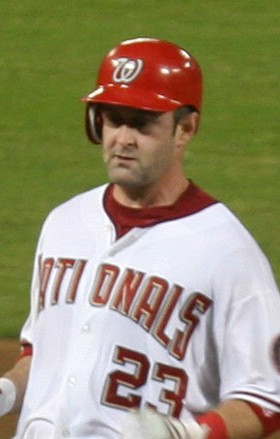
Brian Schneider's July 8 walk-off home run gave the Phillies a 4–3 extra-inning victory over the Cincinnati Reds, their first of three consecutive walk-off wins.

The first game of July was also the first of a four-game series against the Pirates; bench coach Pete Mackanin led the Phillies during Manuel's one-game suspension stemming from an incident with umpire C. B. Bucknor, but Philadelphia lost, 3–2. Their third consecutive loss came from seven scoreless innings by Pirates starter Ross Ohlendorf, but they broke the streak by defeating Pittsburgh, 12–4, on July 3. The Pirates came back to win the final game of the four-game set, 8–5. Halladay's major-league-leading seventh complete-game victory opened the series with Atlanta, a 3–1 win for the Phillies; however, Philadelphia dropped the second game in extra innings despite eight strikeouts in seven innings from Hamels. A second consecutive loss to Atlanta—7–5 on July 7—dropped the Phillies six games behind the division leaders, but they defeated the Reds in extra innings the following night, 4–3, on a walk-off home run by Brian Schneider in the 12th inning. The Phillies continued their winning ways in the late innings the following night, coming back from a six-run deficit in the ninth inning to win, 9–7, in the 10th inning on Howard's home run, and winning the third game on Rollins' RBI single in the eleventh. Another RBI single from Rollins provided the only run in the Phillies' final victory before the All-Star Break and capped the four-game series sweep for Philadelphia.

After the break, the Phillies opened the season's second half with consecutive losses to the Cubs: 12–6 on July 15, and 4–3 on July 16. In the first game, Howard hit two home runs, but the Cubs scored five runs in the seventh inning when they already owned a four-run lead. Another Howard home run gave the Phillies the lead in the sixth inning of the July 16 contest, but the Cubs promptly tied the game in the bottom of the sixth inning and won it with a run in the bottom of the eighth. The Phillies took the third game of the series, 4–1, in Polanco's return from injury, as he tied the game against Chicago closer Carlos Mármol in the ninth inning on July 17, but Philadelphia could not secure a split in the four-game set, dropping the final match, 11–6, with five earned runs allowed by Halladay. Moving to St. Louis for their next series against the Cardinals, the Phillies lost the opener, 8–4, as Kendrick allowed five runs in the fifth inning. St. Louis won their seventh straight game with a 7–1 defeat of the Phillies on July 20, and followed it with their eighth straight victory in a 5–1 win on July 21; it was Philadelphia's fourth straight loss. The Phillies avoided the series sweep, however, by winning the final game of the series, 2–0; Polanco hit a two-run home run in the top of the 11th inning after Hamels one-hit the Cardinals through eight.

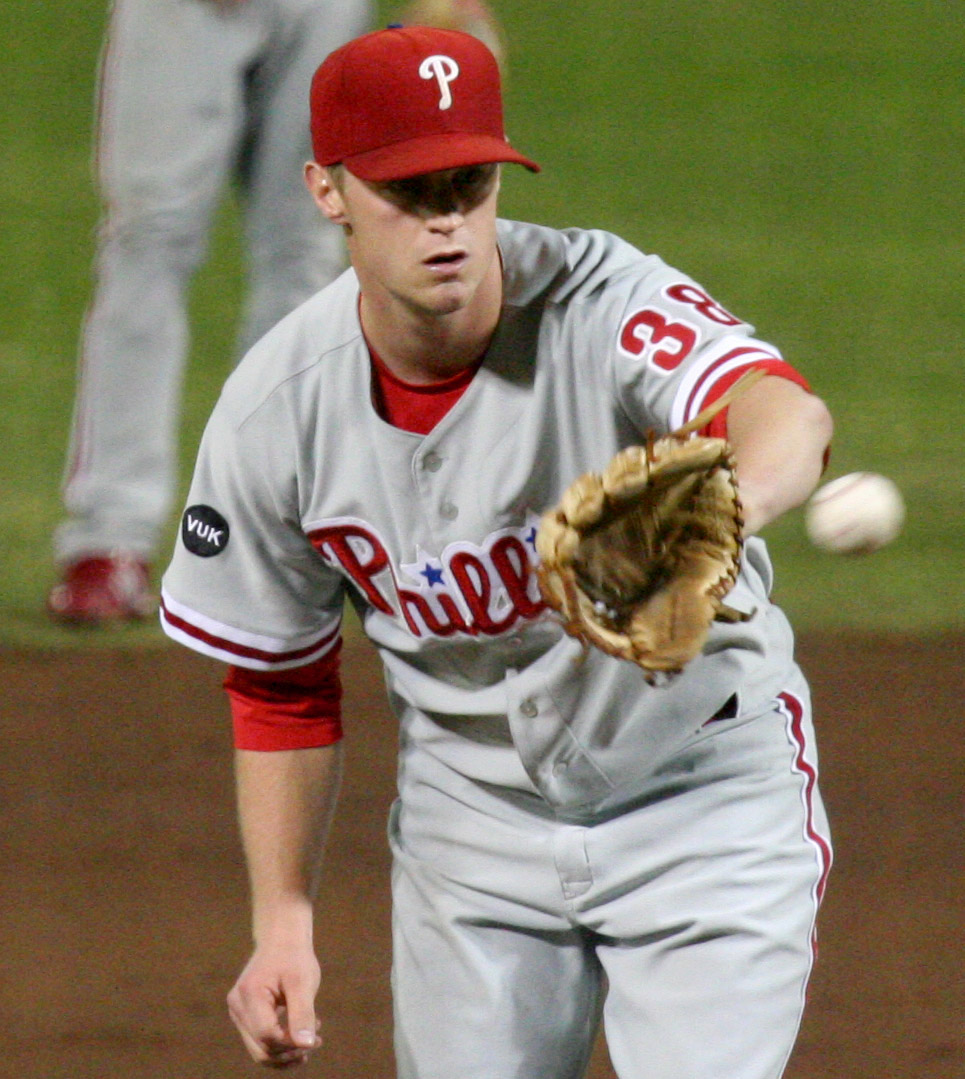
5–4 Kyle Kendrick defeated 15–1 Ubaldo Jiménez on July 24.

The Phillies returned home to face the Rockies in a four-game series; they opened with a five-run fifth inning to support Halladay's 11th victory of the year in a 6–0 win, and won their third straight game by handing Colorado starting pitcher Ubaldo Jiménez his second loss of the season in a 10–2 victory. Two consecutive one-run games—a 4–3 contest on July 25 and a 5–4 win on July 26—sealed the Phillies' series sweep; Schneider hit a two-run triple in the final match to give the Phillies a lead that they did not relinquish, despite two consecutive games of ninth-inning struggles from Lidge. Philadelphia continued against the National League West on July 27 when they opened a series against the Diamondbacks with a 9–5 victory; Howard hit his 23rd home run, but Victorino and Rollins were both injured in the contest. Victorino's abdominal strain put him on the disabled list, and top prospect Domonic Brown was promoted to take his place; Brown went 2-for-3 with two runs scored, two runs batted in, and a sacrifice fly in his major league debut the following night, a 7–1 complete-game victory by Halladay. After acquiring starting pitcher Roy Oswalt in a trade from the Astros for Happ, Valdez sealed Philadelphia's eighth consecutive victory with an 11th-inning single to score Cody Ransom with one out on July 29. Oswalt made his first start as a Phillies the following night, but the Nationals defeated the Phillies to end their winning streak; Werth hit a solo home run to score the Phillies' only run. A second straight loss to Washington closed Philadelphia's month; after taking a one-run lead against Drew Storen in the top of the ninth inning, Ryan Zimmerman hit a walk-off three-run home run against Lidge in the bottom of the ninth. The Phillies finished with a 15–13 record in the month of July.

=== August ===
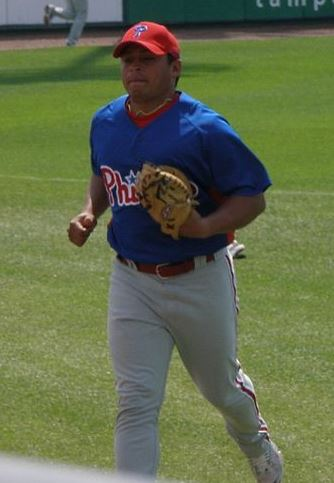
Carlos Ruiz had four hits, including a home run, on August 3, and walked off against the Los Angeles Dodgers on August 12.

In their first August game, the Phillies avoided being swept by Washington with a 6–4 extra-inning victory; Howard was lost to a sprained ankle in the game, but the Phillies scored two runs against Collin Balester in the top of the 11th inning and Lidge earned his 11th save. Howard's ankle injury sent him to the disabled list on August 3; John Mayberry Jr. was called up in his place. The next night, Halladay batted in two runs and struck out nine hitters over seven innings to notch a 6–1 victory in his first return to the location of his perfect game; Ruiz added four hits, and Francisco had a solo home run. The second game of the series marked a third straight Phillies victory, as Brown backed Kendrick's two-run effort with three runs batted in and an outfield assist to put out Marlins first baseman Gaby Sánchez at home plate. Philadelphia won its 60th game of the season in extra innings on a Ruiz home run in the top of the 10th; Lidge earned his 12th save as the Phillies swept the Marlins to climb to 12 games over .500. The Mets visited Citizens Bank Park for a three-game series starting on August 6; the Phillies defeated the Mets, 7–5, after scoring six runs in the eighth inning. New York evened the series with a 1–0 victory to hand Hamels his eighth loss of the season despite 11 strikeouts, but Philadelphia took the series with a 6–5 win in Sunday's rubber match; Ibáñez extended his career-long hitting streak to 16 games, while Halladay struck out ten batters in seven innings.

August 10 saw the Dodgers arriving in Philadelphia for a three-game series; despite Brown's first career home run and two from Gload, Kendrick allowed 6 runs in 3 1/3 innings, and six pitchers from the bullpen allowed nine more to seal the Phillies' 50th loss of the year, 15–9. The offensive outbursts by both teams were followed by a pitcher's duel on August 11—Chad Billingsley allowed two runs in six innings of work, but Oswalt scattered five hits and struck out five in seven shutout innings to pick up his first victory as a Phillie; he was followed by Madson and then Lidge, who earned his 15th save with a perfect ninth inning. In the rubber match, the Dodgers scored three runs in the top of the first inning, and led 9–2 by the eighth inning, but Philadelphia scored four runs in the bottom of the eighth, and another four runs in the bottom of the ninth on only one hit, a walk-off RBI double by Ruiz after a hit batter and two walks by Jonathan Broxton and an error by Casey Blake at third base. It was Ruiz' third double against Broxton in three career at-bats. Another series against the Mets at Citi Field yielded the same results as the prior one; Dickey and Hamels engaged in a pitcher's duel in the first game, which the Mets won, 1–0, after the knuckleballer threw a one-hit shutout. In the second game, Halladay turned the tables with an eight-inning shutout performance after the Phillies scored three unearned runs due to an error by third baseman David Wright, snapping a 38-inning scoreless streak at the Mets' home field. Although the Mets filled their lineup with left-handed batters, who had batted .330 through August 14 against Kendrick, he defeated Pelfrey in the final game of the series, 3–1, to seal the Phillies' third consecutive series win by pitching 6 2/3 innings and allowing one run. In the next series, the Giants visited Citizens Bank Park to open a ten-game Philadelphia homestand; former Phillie Pat Burrell hit a home run in the first inning against Oswalt, but the Phillies won, 9–3, behind a two-run single from Rollins and a two-run double from Ruiz. It was Oswalt's first 2010 victory against the Giants; he had faced Lincecum in each of his first three starts against San Francisco, and he sported an 0–3 record with a 3.15 earned run average. Rollins led the Phillies to a second consecutive victory the following night, going 3-for-5 and falling a double short of the cycle in an 8–2 victory. Assured of the series win, the Phillies tried for a three-game sweep in their 100th consecutive sellout, but Hamels allowed three runs in the first inning, and a total of five; the Phillies scored two runs on a double by Sweeney, but could not seal their third straight victory, losing 5–2.

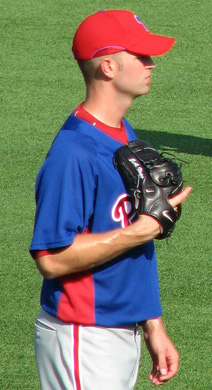
J. A. Happ defeated the Phillies for his fourth victory of the season after being sent to Houston at the trade deadline.

On August 20, Philadelphia began a three-game series against Washington. Halladay captured his sixth straight victory in a 1–0 victory, lowering his ERA to 2.16 despite committing his first balk in over five seasons; the Phillies' only run was plated by Ibáñez in the third inning. Stephen Strasburg made his first start against the Phillies in the second game, leaving early with an injury; Washington, however, scored eight runs to draw even in the series. Oswalt won his third consecutive game the following day, raising his record in a Phillies uniform to 3–0, to take the series with a 6–0 victory. In the opening game of the next series against Houston, Philadelphia led, 2–1, after seven innings of play, when former Phillies outfielder Michael Bourn appeared to leave the basepath running from home plate to first base on an infield single. Though Utley, Howard, and Manuel all argued the call—leading to the latter's ejection—the call by umpire Greg Gibson, later called "controversial", stood and Bourn scored the winning run in the 3–2 Philadelphia loss. Umpiring played a role the following night, as the Phillies and Astros played to extra innings. In the 14th, Howard was called out on a check-swing third strike by Triple-A fill-in umpire Scott Barry. As Howard tossed his bat toward the dugout, Barry ejected Howard from the game for arguing balls and strikes. After a brief on-field altercation, the Phillies, who were out of bench players, moved Ibáñez to first base and brought on Oswalt to play left field, where he made the first putout of the 15th inning on a fly ball. Ibáñez made the third out on a race to first base with Bourn, but made an error in the 16th during a two-run Astros rally; the Phillies lost their longest game of the season, 4–2. Happ defeated Halladay in his first appearance against Philadelphia since being traded; he allowed 2 runs through 6 1/3 innings to secure his fourth victory of the season and seal Halladay's ninth loss. Houston completed the four-game sweep in a 5–1 contest on August 26; it was the Astros' first four-game sweep since they beat the Phillies in four straight games the previous season. After taking the lead from the Padres in the eighth inning of the opener of the next series in San Diego, Lidge balked in the winning run in the bottom of the ninth, but Rollins scored the winning run from second base on a Polanco single in the twelfth with a slide later described as "fantastic", "athletic", and "unbelievable". Victorino notched two hits and two RBI against right-handed pitcher Jon Garland in the series' second game, although he had batted only .220 against right-handers through August 26; the Phillies won, 3–1. Philadelphia completed their three-game sweep of San Diego behind eight shutout innings from Hamels and a two-run home run from Sweeney, his first in a Phillies uniform. Against the Dodgers, Hiroki Kuroda no-hit the Phillies into the eighth inning on August 30 before Victorino singled; the Phillies lost, 3–0. To complete the month, the Phillies defeated Los Angeles behind Howard's first home run since July 27; the final tally was 8–4 in Philadelphia's favor, finishing the month with an 18–10 record.

=== September and October ===
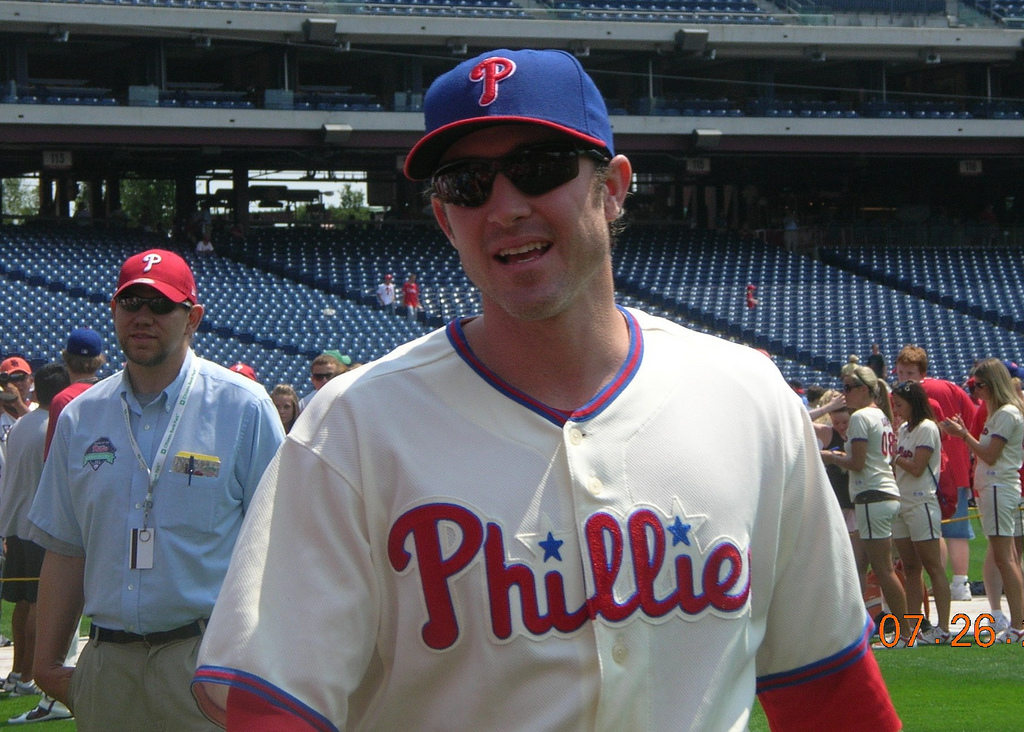
Chase Utley hit a career-high three doubles during the Phillies' first September game.

The Phillies opened the season's final full month with victories on four consecutive days. On September 1, they defeated the Dodgers, 5–1, to complete their last series of the year against a National League West team; Oswalt no-hit Los Angeles through 5 2/3 innings and was supported by a career-high three doubles from Utley. After a one-game stop in Colorado to make up the rainout from May 11—Philadelphia won, 12–11—the Phillies returned home to play their final series against the National League Central, facing the Brewers. Hamels stretched his scoreless streak to 18 consecutive innings in a 1–0 victory, and Philadelphia took a second straight one-run victory on September 4 in a 5–4 win. However, they could not complete the sweep, as Milwaukee won the series' final game, 6–2. The next series against Florida opened with a doubleheader, which the teams split; the Marlins won the day game, 7–1, behind six innings of one-hit ball from rookie Adalberto Méndez, while the Phillies took the nightcap, 7–4. The Phillies took the remaining games of the series as well, winning 8–7 on September 7 and 10–6 the following day, to move into first place in the National League East for the first time since May. Against the rival Mets, Halladay batted in two runs to put the Phillies ahead in the series opener; in doing so, he won his 18th game of the season. New York evened the series in a 4–3 contest on September 11, but Philadelphia bounced back to take their fifth straight series with a 3–0 victory; Oswalt pitched a complete-game shutout, the eighth of his career.

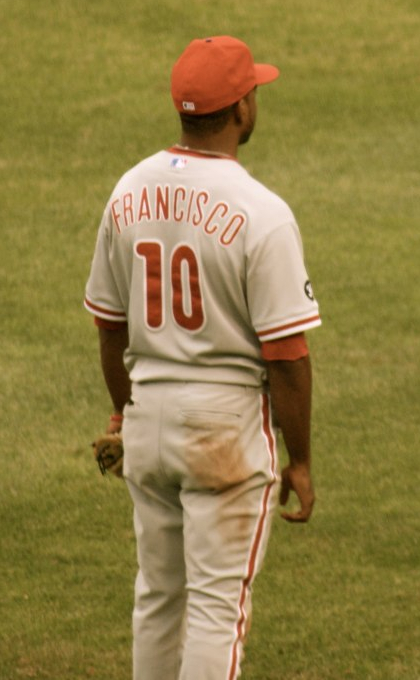
Ben Francisco hit two home runs in the Phillies' first victory after clinching their fourth consecutive division title.

Oswalt's shutout proved to be a harbinger, as it was the first victory in the Phillies' season-long 11-game winning streak. Their next series against Florida resulted in a sweep, the first of three consecutive series; Philadelphia defeated the Marlins, 11–4, in the series opener behind home runs from Werth, Utley, Ruiz, and Greg Dobbs. A 2–1 victory in the second contest—in which Hamels struck out 13 Marlins—was Philadelphia's closest win, which was followed by a 10–5 victory on September 16 to close out the series. Three consecutive wins over Washington completed the next series: a 9–1 victory on September 17, highlighted by a six-run first inning; a 5–2 win the following night in which Howard extended his streak of 30 home run and 100 RBI seasons to five; and the sweep completed by a 7–6 contest in which Werth hit a walk-off two-run home run. The next series came against Atlanta, who entered three games behind Philadelphia in the division standings at the start of play on September 20. However, the Phillies swept the Braves with three consecutive victories, beginning with a 3–1 win in which Hamels threw eight innings, calling the game "a chess match" and crediting his improved cut fastball and curveball. The second game of the series, which Philadelphia won 5–3, was Halladay's 20th victory of the season; he became the first Phillie pitcher to reach the mark since Steve Carlton in 1982, and the first right-hander to do so since Roberts in 1955. Werth scored on an Ibáñez double in the bottom of the eighth inning of the final contest to score the game's only run; the Phillies won, 1–0, after Oswalt and the Braves' Tommy Hanson pitched to a stalemate.

Philadelphia's 11th victory in a row came against the Mets on September 24—they won, 3–2—but they dropped the next two games to New York, 5–2 and 7–3, to notch their first series loss in September. With their magic number at one, Philadelphia visited Washington with Halladay on the mound; they clinched their fourth consecutive NL East title behind the pitcher's 8–0 shutout victory. The Phillies became the third National League team in history to play in the postseason in four consecutive seasons, joining the Braves (1991–2005, excluding 1994) and the New York Giants (1921–1924). In the series' second contest, the Phillies lost, 2–1, while resting several regulars to prepare for the National League Division Series. They salvaged the series victory, however, with a 7–1 win on September 29; three backup players, including Sweeney, Francisco, and John Mayberry Jr., hit home runs in the game; the Phillies finished the month 21–6. Though some, including Chipper Jones, had speculated that the final series against the Braves would decide the division, Atlanta sought a wild-card berth after the Phillies had claimed the NL East crown. Philadelphia won the first game of their final series against the Braves to "put [a] dent in Atlanta's playoff plans" behind a Rollins grand slam in the sixth inning. The Phillies continued to play strongly with a third consecutive win, 7–0; after playing to a scoreless tie through six innings, Philadelphia scored four runs in the seventh to take the first lead of the contest. In the season's final game, the Braves clinched the wild card spot to seal their postseason berth with an 8–7 victory over the Phillies. The Phillies finished October with a 2–1 record, and the season at 97–65; it was the first time in franchise history that Philadelphia had completed a season with Major League Baseball's best record.

Incredibly, the Phillies claimed baseball's best record after a two-month stretch during which they were one of the worst teams. On May 21, they held the best record in the NL at 26–15. Over the next two months, Philadelphia fell seven games out of first place, languishing in third through much of the period. The Phillies' 22–31 record during that stretch was worse than every team except Pittsburgh, Baltimore, Arizona, Washington and Seattle (all teams who finished the season in last place). Starting from July 22, perhaps motivated by the firing that day of batting coach Milt Thompson, the Phillies went an MLB-best 49–19 through the rest of the season.

=== Season standings ===
==== National League East ====
NL East
| Team | W | L | Pct. | GB | Home | Road |
|---|---|---|---|---|---|---|
| Philadelphia Phillies | 97 | 65 | .599 | — | 54‍–‍30 | 43‍–‍35 |
| Atlanta Braves | 91 | 71 | .562 | 6 | 56‍–‍25 | 35‍–‍46 |
| Florida Marlins | 80 | 82 | .494 | 17 | 41‍–‍40 | 39‍–‍42 |
| New York Mets | 79 | 83 | .488 | 18 | 47‍–‍34 | 32‍–‍49 |
| Washington Nationals | 69 | 93 | .426 | 28 | 41‍–‍40 | 28‍–‍53 |

==== National League Wild Card ====
Division leaders
| Team | W | L | Pct. |
|---|---|---|---|
| Philadelphia Phillies | 97 | 65 | .599 |
| San Francisco Giants | 92 | 70 | .568 |
| Cincinnati Reds | 91 | 71 | .562 |

Wild Card team (Top team qualifies for postseason)
| Team | W | L | Pct. | GB |
|---|---|---|---|---|
| Atlanta Braves | 91 | 71 | .562 | — |
| San Diego Padres | 90 | 72 | .556 | 1 |
| St. Louis Cardinals | 86 | 76 | .531 | 5 |
| Colorado Rockies | 83 | 79 | .512 | 8 |
| Florida Marlins | 80 | 82 | .494 | 11 |
| Los Angeles Dodgers | 80 | 82 | .494 | 11 |
| New York Mets | 79 | 83 | .488 | 12 |
| Milwaukee Brewers | 77 | 85 | .475 | 14 |
| Houston Astros | 76 | 86 | .469 | 15 |
| Chicago Cubs | 75 | 87 | .463 | 16 |
| Washington Nationals | 69 | 93 | .426 | 22 |
| Arizona Diamondbacks | 65 | 97 | .401 | 26 |
| Pittsburgh Pirates | 57 | 105 | .352 | 34 |

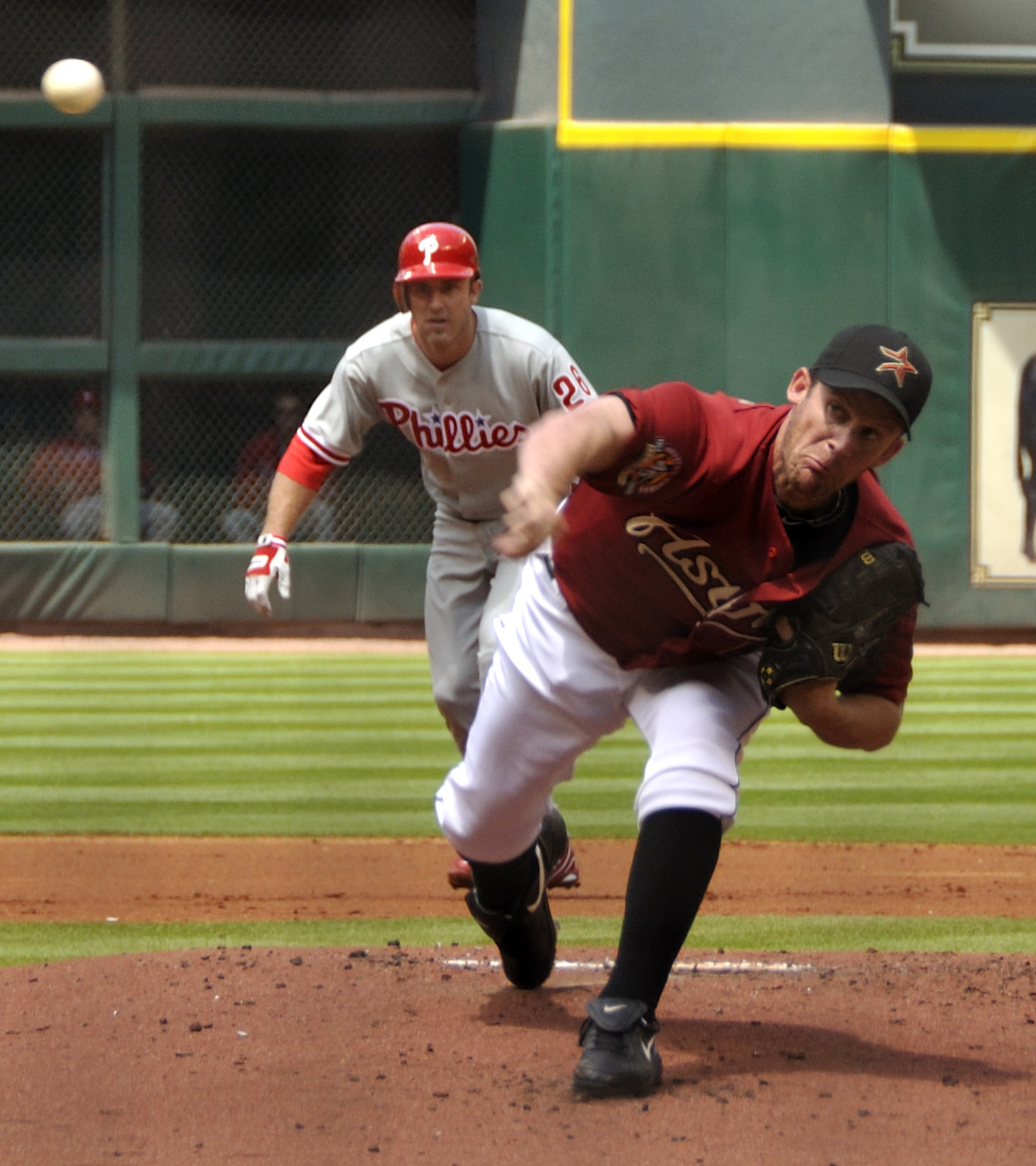
The Phillies acquired starting pitcher Roy Oswalt from the Houston Astros on July 29.

==== Record vs. opponents ====
2010 National League record Source: MLB Standings Grid – 2010
| Team | AZ | ATL | CHC | CIN | COL | FLA | HOU | LAD | MIL | NYM | PHI | PIT | SD | SF | STL | WSH | AL |
|---|---|---|---|---|---|---|---|---|---|---|---|---|---|---|---|---|---|
| Arizona | – | 3–4 | 1–6 | 2–5 | 9–9 | 3–3 | 4–3 | 5–13 | 3–4 | 5–1 | 2–4 | 2–4 | 8–10 | 5–13 | 4–5 | 3–4 | 6–9 |
| Atlanta | 4–3 | – | 4–2 | 3–2 | 2–4 | 11–7 | 5–1 | 5–3 | 5–2 | 11–7 | 8–10 | 6–3 | 4–2 | 4–3 | 2–6 | 8–10 | 9–6 |
| Chicago | 6–1 | 2–4 | – | 4–12 | 2–3 | 4–2 | 7–11 | 3–4 | 9–6 | 3–4 | 4–2 | 5–10 | 3–5 | 2–5 | 9–6 | 4–2 | 8–10 |
| Cincinnati | 5–2 | 2–3 | 12–4 | – | 2–5 | 5–2 | 10–5 | 5–4 | 11–3 | 4–2 | 2–5 | 10–6 | 2–4 | 3–4 | 6–12 | 4–3 | 8–7 |
| Colorado | 9–9 | 4–2 | 3–2 | 5–2 | – | 3–4 | 2–4 | 7–11 | 5–4 | 3–3 | 1–6 | 3–4 | 12–6 | 9–9 | 3–4 | 5–3 | 9–6 |
| Florida | 3–3 | 7–11 | 2–4 | 2–5 | 4–3 | – | 3–3 | 4–2 | 4–4 | 12–6 | 5–13 | 6–2 | 3–6 | 2–5 | 3–2 | 13–5 | 7–8 |
| Houston | 3–4 | 1–5 | 11–7 | 5–10 | 4–2 | 3–3 | – | 2–4 | 8–7 | 3–4 | 4–3 | 11–4 | 2–5 | 2–7 | 10–5 | 4–4 | 3–12 |
| Los Angeles | 13–5 | 3–5 | 4–3 | 4–5 | 11–7 | 2–4 | 4–2 | – | 4–2 | 3–4 | 2–4 | 4–3 | 8–10 | 8–10 | 3–4 | 3–3 | 4–11 |
| Milwaukee | 4–3 | 2–5 | 6–9 | 3–11 | 4–5 | 4–4 | 7–8 | 2–4 | – | 5–2 | 1–5 | 13–5 | 3–4 | 2–5 | 8–7 | 4–2 | 9–6 |
| New York | 1–5 | 7–11 | 4–3 | 2–4 | 3–3 | 6–12 | 4–3 | 4–3 | 2–5 | – | 9–9 | 6–1 | 3–3 | 3–4 | 3–3 | 9–9 | 13–5 |
| Philadelphia | 4–2 | 10–8 | 2–4 | 5–2 | 6–1 | 13–5 | 3–4 | 4–2 | 5–1 | 9–9 | – | 2–4 | 5–2 | 3–3 | 4–4 | 12–6 | 10–8 |
| Pittsburgh | 4–2 | 3–6 | 10–5 | 6–10 | 4–3 | 2–6 | 4–11 | 3–4 | 5–13 | 1–6 | 4–2 | – | 0–6 | 2–4 | 6–9 | 1–5 | 2–13 |
| San Diego | 10–8 | 2–4 | 5–3 | 4–2 | 6–12 | 6–3 | 5–2 | 10–8 | 4–3 | 3–3 | 2–5 | 6–0 | – | 12–6 | 3–4 | 3–3 | 9–6 |
| San Francisco | 13–5 | 3–4 | 5–2 | 4–3 | 9–9 | 5–2 | 7–2 | 10–8 | 5–2 | 4–3 | 3–3 | 4–2 | 6–12 | – | 3–3 | 4–2 | 7–8 |
| St. Louis | 5–4 | 6–2 | 6–9 | 12–6 | 4–3 | 2–3 | 5–10 | 4–3 | 7–8 | 3–3 | 4–4 | 9–6 | 4–3 | 3–3 | – | 3–3 | 9–6 |
| Washington | 4–3 | 10–8 | 2–4 | 3–4 | 3–5 | 5–13 | 4–4 | 3–3 | 2–4 | 9–9 | 6–12 | 5–1 | 3–3 | 2–4 | 3–3 | – | 5–13 |

=== Game log ===
2010 game log
April (12–10)

| # | Date | Opponent | Score | Win | Loss | Save | Attendance | Record |
|---|---|---|---|---|---|---|---|---|
| 1 | April 5 | @ Nationals | 11–1 | **Halladay** (1–0) | Lannan (0–1) | | 41,290 | 1–0 |
| 2 | April 7 | @ Nationals | 8–4 | **Hamels** (1–0) | Marquis (0–1) | **Madson** (1) | 27,240 | 2–0 |
| 3 | April 8 | @ Nationals | 6–5 | Clippard (1–0) | **Figueroa** (0–1) | Capps (1) | 20,217 | 2–1 |
| 4 | April 9 | @ Astros | 8–0 | **Happ** (1–0) | Norris (0–1) | | 27,288 | 3–1 |
| 5 | April 10 | @ Astros | 9–6 | **Moyer** (1–0) | Lyon (0–1) | | 35,138 | 4–1 |
| 6 | April 11 | @ Astros | 2–1 | **Halladay** (2–0) | Oswalt (0–2) | | 28,619 | 5–1 |
| 7 | April 12 | Nationals | 7–4 | **Hamels** (2–0) | Marquis (0–2) | **Madson** (2) | 44,791 | 6–1 |
| 8 | April 14 | Nationals | 14–7 | **Figueroa** (1–1) | Bergmann (0–1) | | 45,438 | 7–1 |
| 9 | April 15 | Nationals | 7–5 | Clippard (2–0) | **Báez** (0–1) | Capps (4) | 44,157 | 7–2 |
| 10 | April 16 | Marlins | 8–6 | **Halladay** (3–0) | Sánchez (0–1) | **Madson** (3) | 45,245 | 8–2 |
| 11 | April 17 | Marlins | 5–1 | Nolasco (1–0) | **Moyer** (1–1) | | 45,305 | 8–3 |
| 12 | April 18 | Marlins | 2–0 | Robertson (2–0) | **Hamels** (2–1) | Núñez (3) | 45,405 | 8–4 |
| 13 | April 20 | @ Braves | 4–3 (10) | Wagner (1–0) | **Contreras** (0–1) | | 18,032 | 8–5 |
| 14 | April 21 | @ Braves | 2–0 | **Halladay** (4–0) | Hudson (1–1) | | 21,171 | 9–5 |
| 15 | April 22 | @ Braves | 8–3 | **Moyer** (2–1) | Lowe (3–1) | | 22,476 | 10–5 |
| 16 | April 23 | @ Diamondbacks | 7–4 | Benson (1–1) | **Hamels** (2–2) | Qualls (3) | 25,980 | 10–6 |
| 17 | April 24 | @ Diamondbacks | 3–2 | **Contreras** (1–1) | Gutiérrez (0–2) | **Madson** (4) | 33,323 | 11–6 |
| 18 | April 25 | @ Diamondbacks | 8–6 | Rosales (2–0) | **Herndon** (0–1) | Qualls (4) | 29,296 | 11–7 |
| 19 | April 26 | @ Giants | 5–1 | Sánchez (2–1) | **Halladay** (4–1) | | 30,035 | 11–8 |
| 20 | April 27 | @ Giants | 6–2 | Wellemeyer (1–3) | **Moyer** (2–2) | | 31,792 | 11–9 |
| 21 | April 28 | @ Giants | 7–6 (11) | **Madson** (1–0) | Romo (0–2) | **Figueroa** (1) | 32,369 | 12–9 |
| 22 | April 30 | Mets | 9–1 | Niese (1–1) | **Kendrick** (0–1) | | 45,296 | 12–10 |

May (16–12)

| # | Date | Opponent | Score | Win | Loss | Save | Attendance | Record |
|---|---|---|---|---|---|---|---|---|
| 23 | May 1 | Mets | 10–0 | **Halladay** (5–1) | Pelfrey (4–0) | | 45,264 | 13–10 |
| 24 | May 2 | Mets | 11–5 | **Moyer** (3–2) | Santana (3–2) | | 45,439 | 14–10 |
| 25 | May 3 | Cardinals | 6–3 | García (3–1) | **Blanton** (0–1) | | 44,817 | 14–11 |
| 26 | May 4 | Cardinals | 2–1 (10) | **Contreras** (2–1) | Hawksworth (0–1) | | 44,890 | 15–11 |
| 27 | May 5 | Cardinals | 4–0 | **Kendrick** (1–1) | Penny (3–2) | | 44,261 | 16–11 |
| 28 | May 6 | Cardinals | 7–2 | **Halladay** (6–1) | Lohse (0–2) | | 44,831 | 17–11 |
| 29 | May 7^{[a]} | Braves | 7–0 | **Moyer** (4–2) | Lowe (4–3) | | 45,349 | 18–11 |
| 30 | May 8 | Braves | 4–1 | O'Flaherty (2–1) | **Blanton** (0–2) | Wagner (4) | 45,395 | 18–12 |
| 31 | May 9 | Braves | 5–3 | **Hamels** (3–2) | Kawakami (0–6) | **Lidge** (1) | 45,193 | 19–12 |
| 32 | May 10 | @ Rockies | 9–5 | **Báez** (1–1) | Corpas (1–2) | | 30,403 | 20–12 |
| — | May 11 | @ Rockies | Postponed due to weather (May 12) | | | | | |
| 33 | May 12 (1) | @ Rockies | 4–3 (10) | Beimel (1–0) | **Durbin** (0–1) | | 23,475 | 20–13 |
| — | May 12 (2) | @ Rockies | Postponed due to weather (September 2) | | | | | |
| 34 | May 14 | @ Brewers | 9–5 | **Moyer** (5–2) | Wolf (3–3) | | 41,706 | 21–13 |
| 35 | May 15 | @ Brewers | 10–6 | **Blanton** (1–2) | Narveson (3–1) | **Contreras** (1) | 43,069 | 22–13 |
| 36 | May 16 | @ Brewers | 4–2 | **Hamels** (4–2) | Bush (1–4) | **Romero** (1) | 37,023 | 23–13 |
| 37 | May 17 | Pirates | 12–2 | **Kendrick** (2–1) | Morton (1–7) | | 45,371 | 24–13 |
| 38 | May 18 | Pirates | 2–1 | Duke (3–4) | **Halladay** (6–2) | Dotel (8) | 45,007 | 24–14 |
| 39 | May 19 | Cubs | 4–1 | Gorzelanny (2–4) | **Moyer** (5–3) | Mármol (7) | 45,140 | 24–15 |
| 40 | May 20 | Cubs | 5–4 | **Báez** (2–1) | Grabow (0–3) | **Contreras** (2) | 45,325 | 25–15 |
| 41 | May 21 | Red Sox | 5–1 | **Hamels** (5–2) | Lackey (4–3) | **Romero** (2) | 45,341 | 26–15 |
| 42 | May 22 | Red Sox | 5–0 | Matsuzaka (3–1) | **Kendrick** (2–2) | | 45,310 | 26–16 |
| 43 | May 23 | Red Sox | 8–3 | Wakefield (1–2) | **Halladay** (6–3) | | 45,068 | 26–17 |
| 44 | May 25 | @ Mets | 8–0 | Dickey (1–0) | **Moyer** (5–4) | Valdés (1) | 33,026 | 26–18 |
| 45 | May 26 | @ Mets | 5–0 | Takahashi (4–1) | **Blanton** (1–3) | | 33,223 | 26–19 |
| 46 | May 27 | @ Mets | 3–0 | Pelfrey (7–1) | **Hamels** (5–3) | Rodríguez (9) | 35,903 | 26–20 |
| 47 | May 28 | @ Marlins | 3–2 | **Kendrick** (3–2) | Volstad (3–6) | **Contreras** (3) | 15,276 | 27–20 |
| 48 | May 29^{[b]} | @ Marlins | 1–0 | **Halladay** (7–3) | Johnson (5–2) | | 25,086 | 28–20 |
| 49 | May 30 | @ Marlins | 1–0 | Sánchez (5–2) | **Moyer** (5–5) | Núñez (10) | 13,324 | 28–21 |
| 50 | May 31 | @ Braves | 9–3 | Hanson (5–3) | **Blanton** (1–4) | | 42,543 | 28–22 |

June (13–13)

| # | Date | Opponent | Score | Win | Loss | Save | Attendance | Record |
|---|---|---|---|---|---|---|---|---|
| 51 | June 1 | @ Braves | 7–3 | Hudson (6–1) | **Hamels** (5–4) | Wagner (8) | 29,731 | 28–23 |
| 52 | June 2 | @ Braves | 2–1 | Lowe (8–4) | **Contreras** (2–2) | Wagner (9) | 26,309 | 28–24 |
| 53 | June 4 | Padres | 3–2 | **Halladay** (8–3) | Latos (5–4) | **Lidge** (2) | 45,080 | 29–24 |
| 54 | June 5 | Padres | 6–2 | **Moyer** (6–5) | Garland (6–3) | | 45,353 | 30–24 |
| 55 | June 6 | Padres | 6–5 (10) | Adams (1–1) | **Báez** (2–2) | Bell (15) | 44,852 | 30–25 |
| 56 | June 7 | Padres | 3–1 | LeBlanc (3–4) | **Hamels** (5–5) | Bell (16) | 45,398 | 30–26 |
| 57 | June 8 | Marlins | 10–8 | **Contreras** (3–2) | Hensley (1–3) | **Lidge** (3) | 44,098 | 31–26 |
| — | June 9 | Marlins | Postponed due to weather (September 6) | | | | | |
| 58 | June 10 | Marlins | 2–0 | Johnson (7–2) | **Halladay** (8–4) | Núñez (13) | 44,479 | 31–27 |
| 59 | June 11 | @ Red Sox | 12–2 | Lackey (7–3) | **Moyer** (6–6) | | 38,021 | 31–28 |
| 60 | June 12 | @ Red Sox | 10–2 | Delcarmen (2–2) | **Blanton** (1–5) | | 37,061 | 31–29 |
| 61 | June 13 | @ Red Sox | 5–3 | **Hamels** (6–5) | Wakefield (2–5) | **Lidge** (4) | 37,230 | 32–29 |
| 62 | June 15 | @ Yankees | 8–3 | Sabathia (7–3) | **Halladay** (8–5) | | 47,135 | 32–30 |
| 63 | June 16 | @ Yankees | 6–3 | **Moyer** (7–6) | Burnett (6–5) | | 47,414 | 33–30 |
| 64 | June 17 | @ Yankees | 7–1 | **Kendrick** (4–2) | Pettitte (8–2) | | 47,204 | 34–30 |
| 65 | June 18 | Twins | 9–5 | **Blanton** (2–5) | Blackburn (6–4) | | 45,120 | 35–30 |
| 66 | June 19 | Twins | 13–10 (11) | Rauch (2–1) | **Báez** (2–3) | | 45,254 | 35–31 |
| 67 | June 20 | Twins | 4–1 | Pavano (8–6) | **Halladay** (8–6) | | 45,202 | 35–32 |
| 68 | June 22 | Indians | 2–1 | **Moyer** (8–6) | Talbot (7–6) | **Lidge** (5) | 44,836 | 36–32 |
| 69 | June 23 | Indians | 7–6 | **Romero** (1–0) | Wood (1–3) | | 44,510 | 37–32 |
| 70 | June 24 | Indians | 12–3 | **Blanton** (3–5) | Carmona (6–6) | | 45,085 | 38–32 |
| 71 | June 25 | @ Jays* | 9–0 | **Halladay** (9–6) | Litsch (0–2) | | 43,076 | 39–32 |
| 72 | June 26 | @ Jays* | 5–1 | Marcum (7–3) | **Hamels** (6–6) | | 44,426 | 39–33 |
| 73 | June 27^{[c]} | @ Jays* | 11–2 | **Moyer** (9–6) | Cecil (7–5) | | 42,571 | 40–33 |
| 74 | June 28 | @ Reds | 7–3 | Cueto (8–2) | **Kendrick** (4–3) | | 22,090 | 40–34 |
| 75 | June 29 | @ Reds | 9–6 (10) | **Lidge** (1–0) | Rhodes (2–2) | **Romero** (3) | 26,679 | 41–34 |
| 76 | June 30 | @ Reds | 4–3 | Rhodes (3–2) | **Halladay** (9–7) | Cordero (21) | 27,245 | 41–35 |
^{*} – in Philadelphia

July (15–13)

| # | Date | Opponent | Score | Win | Loss | Save | Attendance | Record |
|---|---|---|---|---|---|---|---|---|
| 77 | July 1 | @ Pirates | 3–2 | D. McCutchen (1–3) | **Hamels** (6–7) | Dotel (17) | 25,323 | 41–36 |
| 78 | July 2 | @ Pirates | 2–0 | Ohlendorf (1–6) | **Moyer** (9–7) | Dotel (18) | 30,339 | 41–37 |
| 79 | July 3 | @ Pirates | 12–4 | **Kendrick** (5–3) | Maholm (5–7) | | 38,052 | 42–37 |
| 80 | July 4 | @ Pirates | 8–5 | Meek (4–2) | **Contreras** (3–3) | Dotel (19) | | 42–38 |
| 81 | July 5 | Braves | 3–1 | **Halladay** (10–7) | Lowe (9–7) | | 45,404 | 43–38 |
| 82 | July 6 | Braves | 6–3 (11) | Chavez (1–1) | **Herndon** (0–2) | Wagner (18) | 44,715 | 43–39 |
| 83 | July 7 | Braves | 7–5 | Medlen (6–1) | **Moyer** (9–8) | Wagner (19) | 44,282 | 43–40 |
| 84 | July 8 | Reds | 4–3 (12) | **Figueroa** (2–1) | Smith (2–2) | | 45,086 | 44–40 |
| 85 | July 9 | Reds | 9–7 (10) | **Madson** (2–0) | Rhodes (3–3) | | 45,029 | 45–40 |
| 86 | July 10 | Reds | 1–0 (11) | **Contreras** (4–3) | Bray (0–1) | | 45,347 | 46–40 |
| 87 | July 11 | Reds | 1–0 | **Hamels** (7–7) | Maloney (0–2) | **Lidge** (6) | 44,913 | 47–40 |
All-Star Break: NL defeats AL, 3–1
| 88 | July 15 | @ Cubs | 12–6 | Dempster (8–7) | **Moyer** (9–9) | | 40,879 | 47–41 |
| 89 | July 16 | @ Cubs | 4–3 | Marshall (6–2) | **Madson** (2–1) | Mármol (17) | 40,622 | 47–42 |
| 90 | July 17 | @ Cubs | 4–1 | **Durbin** (1–1) | Mármol (2–2) | **Lidge** (7) | 40,924 | 48–42 |
| 91 | July 18 | @ Cubs | 11–6 | Gorzelanny (5–5) | **Halladay** (10–8) | | 39,333 | 48–43 |
| 92 | July 19 | @ Cardinals | 8–4 | Hawksworth (4–5) | **Kendrick** (5–4) | | 40,253 | 48–44 |
| 93 | July 20 | @ Cardinals | 7–1 | Carpenter (11–3) | **Carpenter** (0–1) | | 38,712 | 48–45 |
| 94 | July 21 | @ Cardinals | 5–1 | García (9–4) | **Blanton** (3–6) | Franklin (18) | 41,089 | 48–46 |
| 95 | July 22 | @ Cardinals | 2–0 (11) | **Durbin** (2–1) | McClellan (1–3) | **Lidge** (8) | 40,062 | 49–46 |
| 96 | July 23 | Rockies | 6–0 | **Halladay** (11–8) | Cook (4–6) | | 45,265 | 50–46 |
| 97 | July 24 | Rockies | 10–2 | **Kendrick** (6–4) | Jiménez (15–2) | | 44,781 | 51–46 |
| 98 | July 25 | Rockies | 4–3 | **Madson** (3–1) | Beimel (1–1) | **Lidge** (9) | 44,726 | 52–46 |
| 99 | July 26 | Rockies | 5–4 | **Blanton** (4–6) | Hammel (7–6) | **Lidge** (10) | 44,838 | 53–46 |
| 100 | July 27 | Diamondbacks | 9–5 | **Herndon** (1–2) | Norberto (0–1) | | 44,379 | 54–46 |
| 101 | July 28 | Diamondbacks | 7–1 | **Halladay** (12–8) | Jackson (6–10) | | 45,048 | 55–46 |
| 102 | July 29 | Diamondbacks | 3–2 (11) | **Contreras** (5–3) | Vásquez (1–4) | | 45,232 | 56–46 |
| 103 | July 30 | @ Nationals | 8–1 | Stammen (3–4) | **Oswalt** (6–13) | | 32,590 | 56–47 |
| 104 | July 31 | @ Nationals | 7–5 | Storen (3–2) | **Lidge** (1–1) | | 38,049 | 56–48 |

August (18–10)

| # | Date | Opponent | Score | Win | Loss | Save | Attendance | Record |
|---|---|---|---|---|---|---|---|---|
| 105 | August 1 | @ Nationals | 6–4 (11) | **Contreras** (6–3) | Balester (0–1) | **Lidge** (11) | 35,807 | 57–48 |
| 106 | August 3 | @ Marlins | 6–1 | **Halladay** (13–8) | West (0–1) | | 19,378 | 58–48 |
| 107 | August 4 | @ Marlins | 7–2 | **Kendrick** (7–4) | A. Sánchez (8–7) | | 21,844 | 59–48 |
| 108 | August 5 | @ Marlins | 5–4 (10) | **Madson** (4–1) | Ohman (0–1) | **Lidge** (12) | 19,121 | 60–48 |
| 109 | August 6 | Mets | 7–5 | **Durbin** (3–1) | Parnell (0–1) | **Lidge** (13) | 45,378 | 61–48 |
| 110 | August 7 | Mets | 1–0 | Santana (9–6) | **Hamels** (7–8) | Rodríguez (24) | 45,194 | 61–49 |
| 111 | August 8 | Mets | 6–5 | **Halladay** (14–8) | Dickey (7–5) | **Lidge** (14) | 45,402 | 62–49 |
| 112 | August 10 | Dodgers | 15–9 | Padilla (6–3) | **Kendrick** (7–5) | | 44,881 | 62–50 |
| 113 | August 11 | Dodgers | 2–0 | **Oswalt** (7–13) | Billingsley (9–7) | **Lidge** (15) | 45,144 | 63–50 |
| 114 | August 12 | Dodgers | 10–9 | **Báez** (3–3) | Broxton (4–4) | | 44,819 | 64–50 |
| 115 | August 13 | @ Mets | 1–0 | Dickey (8–5) | **Hamels** (7–9) | | 35,440 | 64–51 |
| 116 | August 14 | @ Mets | 4–0 | **Halladay** (15–8) | Misch (0–1) | | 39,151 | 65–51 |
| 117 | August 15 | @ Mets | 3–1 | **Kendrick** (8–5) | Pelfrey (11–7) | **Lidge** (16) | 31,345 | 66–51 |
| 118 | August 17 | Giants | 9–3 | **Oswalt** (8–13) | Zito (8–7) | | 45,401 | 67–51 |
| 119 | August 18 | Giants | 8–2 | **Blanton** (5–6) | Cain (9–10) | | 44,410 | 68–51 |
| 120 | August 19 | Giants | 5–2 | Sánchez (9–8) | **Hamels** (7–10) | Wilson (34) | 45,449 | 68–52 |
| 121 | August 20 | Nationals | 1–0 | **Halladay** (16–8) | Marquis (0–6) | **Lidge** (17) | 45,093 | 69–52 |
| 122 | August 21 | Nationals | 8–1 | Slaten (3–1) | **Kendrick** (8–6) | | 45,266 | 69–53 |
| 123 | August 22 | Nationals | 6–0 | **Oswalt** (9–13) | Olsen (3–6) | | 44,539 | 70–53 |
| 124 | August 23 | Astros | 3–2 | Myers (9–7) | **Madson** (4–2) | Lyon (7) | 44,081 | 70–54 |
| 125 | August 24 | Astros | 4–2 (16) | Fulchino (1–0) | **Herndon** (1–3) | | 45,494 | 70–55 |
| 126 | August 25 | Astros | 3–2 | Happ (4–2) | **Halladay** (16–9) | Lyon (8) | 44,657 | 70–56 |
| 127 | August 26 | Astros | 5–1 | Rodríguez (10–12) | **Kendrick** (8–7) | | 44,958 | 70–57 |
| 128 | August 27 | @ Padres | 3–2 (12) | **Durbin** (4–1) | Frieri (0–1) | | 34,233 | 71–57 |
| 129 | August 28 | @ Padres | 3–1 | **Blanton** (6–6) | Garland (13–9) | **Lidge** (18) | 37,424 | 72–57 |
| 130 | August 29 | @ Padres | 5–0 | **Hamels** (8–10) | Richard (12–6) | | 30,528 | 73–57 |
| 131 | August 30 | @ Dodgers | 3–0 | Kuroda (10–11) | **Halladay** (16–10) | Kuo (7) | 44,896 | 73–58 |
| 132 | August 31 | @ Dodgers | 8–4 | **Kendrick** (9–7) | Monasterios (3–5) | | 45,164 | 74–58 |

September (21–6)

| # | Date | Opponent | Score | Win | Loss | Save | Attendance | Record |
|---|---|---|---|---|---|---|---|---|
| 133 | September 1 | @ Dodgers | 5–1 | **Oswalt** (10–13) | Kershaw (11–9) | | 37,080 | 75–58 |
| 134 | September 2 | @ Rockies | 12–11 | **Bastardo** (1–0) | Delcarmen (3–3) | **Lidge** (19) | 30,179 | 76–58 |
| 135 | September 3 | Brewers | 1–0 | **Hamels** (9–10) | Capuano (2–3) | **Madson** (5) | 44,570 | 77–58 |
| 136 | September 4 | Brewers | 5–4 | **Halladay** (17–10) | Loe (3–4) | **Lidge** (20) | 45,393 | 78–58 |
| 137 | September 5 | Brewers | 6–2 | Wolf (11–10) | **Kendrick** (9–8) | Axford (20) | 45,006 | 78–59 |
| 138 | September 6 (1) | Marlins | 7–1 | Méndez (1–0) | **Worley** (0–1) | | 45,518 | 78–60 |
| 139 | September 6 (2) | Marlins | 7–4 | **Oswalt** (11–13) | Sánchez (11–9) | **Lidge** (21) | 45,373 | 79–60 |
| 140 | September 7 | Marlins | 8–7 | **Madson** (5–2) | Veras (2–2) | | 43,841 | 80–60 |
| 141 | September 8 | Marlins | 10–6 | **Hamels** (10–10) | Miller (1–1) | | 44,221 | 81–60 |
| 142 | September 10 | @ Mets | 8–4 | **Halladay** (18–10) | Mejía (0–4) | | 33,071 | 82–60 |
| 143 | September 11 | @ Mets | 4–3 | Pelfrey (14–9) | **Kendrick** (9–9) | Takahashi (6) | 35,788 | 82–61 |
| 144 | September 12 | @ Mets | 3–0 | **Oswalt** (12–13) | Niese (9–8) | | 31,563 | 83–61 |
| 145 | September 13 | @ Marlins | 11–4 | **Blanton** (7–6) | Miller (1–2) | | 20,616 | 84–61 |
| 146 | September 14 | @ Marlins | 2–1 | **Hamels** (11–10) | Méndez (1–1) | **Lidge** (22) | 18,234 | 85–61 |
| 147 | September 15 | @ Marlins | 10–5 | **Halladay** (19–10) | Sosa (2–3) | **Contreras** (4) | 19,402 | 86–61 |
| 148 | September 17 | Nationals | 9–1 | **Oswalt** (13–13) | Marquis (2–9) | | 45,338 | 87–61 |
| 149 | September 18 | Nationals | 5–2 | **Kendrick** (10–9) | Zimmermann (0–2) | **Lidge** (23) | 45,222 | 88–61 |
| 150 | September 19 | Nationals | 7–6 | **Worley** (1–1) | Storen (3–4) | | 44,936 | 89–61 |
| 151 | September 20 | Braves | 3–1 | **Hamels** (12–10) | Beachy (0–1) | **Lidge** (24) | 45,256 | 90–61 |
| 152 | September 21 | Braves | 5–3 | **Halladay** (20–10) | Minor (3–2) | **Lidge** (25) | 45,264 | 91–61 |
| 153 | September 22 | Braves | 1–0 | **Madson** (6–2) | Venters (4–3) | **Lidge** (26) | 45,310 | 92–61 |
| 154 | September 24 | Mets | 3–2 | **Blanton** (8–6) | Dickey (11–8) | **Lidge** (27) | 45,309 | 93–61 |
| 155 | September 25 | Mets | 5–2 | Gee (2–1) | **Kendrick** (10–10) | Takahashi (8) | 45,274 | 93–62 |
| 156 | September 26 | Mets | 7–3 | Acosta (3–1) | **Hamels** (12–11) | | 45,302 | 93–63 |
| 157 | September 27 | @ Nationals | 8–0 | **Halladay** (21–10) | Lannan (8–8) | | 14,309 | 94–63 |
| 158 | September 28 | @ Nationals | 2–1 | Storen (4–4) | **Contreras** (6–4) | | 19,117 | 94–64 |
| 159 | September 29 | @ Nationals | 7–1 | **Blanton** (9–6) | Detwiler (1–3) | | 20,026 | 95–64 |

October (2–1)

| # | Date | Opponent | Score | Win | Loss | Save | Attendance | Record |
|---|---|---|---|---|---|---|---|---|
| 160 | October 1 | @ Braves | 11–5 | **Kendrick** (11–10) | Beachy (0–2) | | 51,139 | 96–64 |
| 161 | October 2 | @ Braves | 7–0 | **Bastardo** (2–0) | Venters (4–4) | | 54,296 | 97–64 |
| 162 | October 3 | @ Braves | 8–7 | Hudson (17–9) | **Báez** (3–4) | Wagner (37) | 52,613 | 97–65 |

- Phillies win
- Phillies loss
- Postponement
- Bold: Phillies team member

=== Postseason game log ===
2010 postseason game log
NLDS: 3–0

| # | Date | Opponent | Score | Win | Loss | Save | Attendance | Record |
|---|---|---|---|---|---|---|---|---|
| 1 | October 6 | Reds | 4–0 | **Halladay** (1–0) | Vólquez (0–1) | | 46,411 | 1–0 |
| 2 | October 8 | Reds | 7–4 | **Contreras** (1–0) | Chapman (0–1) | **Lidge** (1) | 46,511 | 2–0 |
| 3 | October 10 | @ Reds | 2–0 | **Hamels** (1–0) | Cueto (0–1) | | 44,599 | 3–0 |

NLCS: 2–4

| # | Date | Opponent | Score | Win | Loss | Save | Attendance | Record |
|---|---|---|---|---|---|---|---|---|
| 1 | October 16 | Giants | 3–4 | Lincecum (1–0) | **Halladay** (0–1) | Wilson (1) | 45,929 | 0–1 |
| 2 | October 17 | Giants | 6–1 | **Oswalt** (1–0) | Sánchez (0–1) | | 46,099 | 1–1 |
| 3 | October 19 | @ Giants | 0–3 | Cain (1–0) | **Hamels** (0–1) | Wilson (2) | 43,320 | 1–2 |
| 4 | October 20 | @ Giants | 5–6 | Wilson (1–0) | **Oswalt** (1–1) | | 43,515 | 1–3 |
| 5 | October 21 | @ Giants | 4–2 | **Halladay** (1–1) | Lincecum (1–1) | **Lidge** (1) | 43,713 | 2–3 |
| 6 | October 23 | Giants | 2–3 | López (1–0) | **Madson** (0–1) | Wilson (3) | 46,062 | 2–4 |

=== Roster ===
All players who made an appearance for the Phillies during 2010 are included.

| † | Indicates players who started on Opening Day in 2010 |

2010 Philadelphia Phillies
**Roster**
| **Pitchers**: 55 Danys Báez; 58 Antonio Bastardo; 56 Joe Blanton; 48 Andrew Carpenter; 52 José Contreras; 37 Chad Durbin; 44 Nelson Figueroa; 34 Roy Halladay ^{†}; 35 Cole Hamels; 43 J. A. Happ; 57 David Herndon; 38 Kyle Kendrick; 54 Brad Lidge; 46 Ryan Madson; 47 Scott Mathieson; 50 Jamie Moyer; 44 Roy Oswalt; 31 Nate Robertson; 16 J. C. Romero; 49 Vance Worley; 59 Mike Zagurski | **Catchers**: 24 Paul Hoover; 51 Carlos Ruiz ^{†}; 4 Dane Sardinha; 23 Brian Schneider; **Infielders**: 7 Brian Bocock; 7 Juan Castro; 19 Greg Dobbs; 3 Ross Gload; 6 Ryan Howard ^{†}; 27 Plácido Polanco ^{†}; 12 Cody Ransom; 11 Jimmy Rollins ^{†}; 5 Mike Sweeney; 26 Chase Utley ^{†}; 21 Wilson Valdez | **Outfielders**: 9 Domonic Brown; 10 Ben Francisco; 29 Raúl Ibañez ^{†}; 40 John Mayberry Jr.; 8 Shane Victorino ^{†}; 28 Jayson Werth ^{†} | **Manager**: 41 Charlie Manuel; **Coaches**: 17 Mick Billmeyer (bullpen); 30 Rich Dubee (pitching); 18 Greg Gross (hitting); 15 Davey Lopes (1B); 22 Pete Mackanin (bench); 2 Sam Perlozzo (3B); 25 Milt Thompson (hitting) |

== Player stats ==
Note: Team leaders in all categories are noted in bold.

- = League leader in category.

=== Batting ===
Note: G = Games played; AB = At bats; R = Runs; H = Hits; 2B = Doubles; 3B = Triples; HR = Home runs; RBI = Runs batted in; SB = Stolen bases; BB = Walks; AVG = Batting average; SLG = Slugging average

| Player | G | AB | R | H | 2B | 3B | HR | RBI | SB | BB | AVG | SLG |
|---|---|---|---|---|---|---|---|---|---|---|---|---|
| Shane Victorino | 147 | **587** | 84 | 152 | 26 | **10** | 18 | 69 | **34** | 53 | .259 | .429 |
| Raúl Ibañez | 155 | 561 | 75 | 154 | 37 | 5 | 16 | 83 | 4 | 68 | .275 | .444 |
| Plácido Polanco | 132 | 554 | 76 | **165** | 27 | 2 | 6 | 52 | 5 | 32 | **.298** | .386 |
| Jayson Werth | **156** | 554 | **106** | 164 | **46** | 2 | 27 | 85 | 13 | **82** | .296 | **.532** |
| Ryan Howard | 143 | 550 | 87 | 152 | 23 | 5 | **31** | **108** | 1 | 59 | .276 | .505 |
| Chase Utley | 115 | 425 | 75 | 117 | 20 | 2 | 16 | 65 | 13 | 63 | .275 | .445 |
| Carlos Ruiz | 121 | 371 | 43 | 112 | 28 | 1 | 8 | 53 | 0 | 55 | .302 | .447 |
| Jimmy Rollins | 88 | 350 | 48 | 85 | 16 | 3 | 8 | 41 | 17 | 40 | .243 | .374 |
| Wilson Valdez | 111 | 333 | 37 | 86 | 16 | 3 | 4 | 35 | 7 | 21 | .258 | .360 |
| Ben Francisco | 88 | 179 | 24 | 48 | 13 | 0 | 6 | 28 | 8 | 14 | .268 | .441 |
| Greg Dobbs | 88 | 163 | 13 | 32 | 7 | 0 | 5 | 15 | 1 | 12 | .196 | .331 |
| Ross Gload | 94 | 128 | 16 | 36 | 8 | 0 | 6 | 22 | 1 | 8 | .281 | 484 |
| Juan Castro | 54 | 126 | 7 | 25 | 5 | 0 | 0 | 13 | 0 | 7 | .198 | .238 |
| Brian Schneider | 47 | 125 | 17 | 30 | 4 | 1 | 4 | 15 | 0 | 19 | .240 | .384 |
| Domonic Brown | 35 | 62 | 8 | 13 | 3 | 0 | 2 | 13 | 2 | 5 | .210 | .355 |
| Mike Sweeney | 26 | 52 | 10 | 12 | 2 | 0 | 2 | 8 | 1 | 5 | .231 | .385 |
| Cody Ransom | 22 | 42 | 6 | 8 | 0 | 0 | 2 | 5 | 1 | 3 | .190 | .333 |
| Dane Sardinha | 13 | 39 | 5 | 8 | 2 | 0 | 3 | 8 | 0 | 1 | .205 | .487 |
| Paul Hoover | 9 | 22 | 6 | 5 | 2 | 0 | 0 | 2 | 0 | 3 | .227 | .318 |
| John Mayberry Jr. | 11 | 12 | 4 | 4 | 0 | 0 | 2 | 6 | 0 | 1 | .333 | .833 |
| Brian Bocock | 6 | 5 | 2 | 0 | 0 | 0 | 0 | 0 | 0 | 0 | .000 | .000 |
| Pitcher totals | 162 | 341 | 23 | 43 | 5 | 0 | 0 | 10 | 0 | 9 | .126 | .141 |
| **Team totals** | **162** | **5581** | **772** | **1451** | **290** | **34** | **166** | **736** | **108** | **560** | **.260** | **.413** |

=== Pitching ===
Note: W = Wins; L = Losses; ERA = Earned run average; G = Games pitched; GS = Games started; SV = Saves; IP = Innings pitched; H = Hits allowed; R = Runs allowed; ER = Earned runs allowed; BB = Walks allowed; SO = Strikeouts

| Player | W | L | ERA | G | GS | SV | IP | H | R | ER | BB | SO |
|---|---|---|---|---|---|---|---|---|---|---|---|---|
| Roy Halladay | **21*** | 10 | **2.44** | 33 | **33** | 0 | **250.2*** | **231*** | 74 | 68 | 30 | **219** |
| Cole Hamels | 12 | **11** | 3.06 | 33 | **33** | 0 | 208.2 | 185 | 74 | 71 | **61** | 211 |
| Kyle Kendrick | 11 | 10 | 4.73 | 33 | 31 | 0 | 180.2 | 199 | 103 | **95** | 49 | 84 |
| Joe Blanton | 9 | 6 | 4.82 | 29 | 28 | 0 | 175.2 | 206 | **104** | 94 | 43 | 134 |
| Jamie Moyer | 9 | 9 | 4.84 | 19 | 19 | 0 | 111.2 | 103 | 64 | 60 | 20 | 63 |
| Roy Oswalt | 7 | 1 | 1.74 | 13 | 12 | 0 | 82.2 | 53 | 18 | 16 | 21 | 73 |
| Chad Durbin | 4 | 1 | 3.80 | 64 | 0 | 0 | 68.2 | 63 | 29 | 29 | 27 | 63 |
| José Contreras | 6 | 4 | 3.34 | **67** | 0 | 4 | 56.2 | 53 | 22 | 21 | 16 | 57 |
| Ryan Madson | 6 | 2 | 2.55 | 55 | 0 | 5 | 53.0 | 42 | 16 | 15 | 13 | 64 |
| David Herndon | 1 | 3 | 4.30 | 47 | 0 | 0 | 52.1 | 67 | 27 | 25 | 17 | 29 |
| Danys Báez | 3 | 4 | 5.48 | 51 | 0 | 0 | 47.2 | 55 | 31 | 29 | 23 | 28 |
| Brad Lidge | 1 | 1 | 2.96 | 50 | 0 | **27** | 45.2 | 32 | 16 | 15 | 24 | 52 |
| J.C. Romero | 1 | 0 | 3.68 | 60 | 0 | 3 | 36.2 | 30 | 17 | 15 | 29 | 28 |
| Nelson Figueroa | 2 | 1 | 3.46 | 13 | 1 | 1 | 26.0 | 20 | 10 | 10 | 9 | 15 |
| Antonio Bastardo | 2 | 0 | 4.34 | 25 | 0 | 0 | 18.2 | 19 | 9 | 9 | 9 | 26 |
| J.A. Happ | 1 | 0 | 1.76 | 3 | 3 | 0 | 15.1 | 13 | 4 | 3 | 12 | 9 |
| Vance Worley | 1 | 1 | 1.38 | 5 | 2 | 0 | 13.0 | 8 | 2 | 2 | 4 | 12 |
| Mike Zagurski | 0 | 0 | 10.29 | 8 | 0 | 0 | 7.0 | 8 | 8 | 8 | 5 | 11 |
| Andrew Carpenter | 0 | 1 | 9.00 | 1 | 0 | 0 | 3.0 | 5 | 3 | 3 | 0 | 2 |
| Scott Mathieson | 0 | 0 | 10.80 | 2 | 0 | 0 | 1.2 | 5 | 3 | 2 | 2 | 1 |
| Nate Robertson | 0 | 0 | 54.00 | 2 | 0 | 0 | 1.0 | 5 | 6 | 6 | 2 | 2 |
| **Team totals** | **97** | **65** | **3.67** | **162** | **162** | **40** | **1456.1** | **1402** | **640** | **594** | **416** | **1183** |

== Postseason ==
=== National League Division Series ===
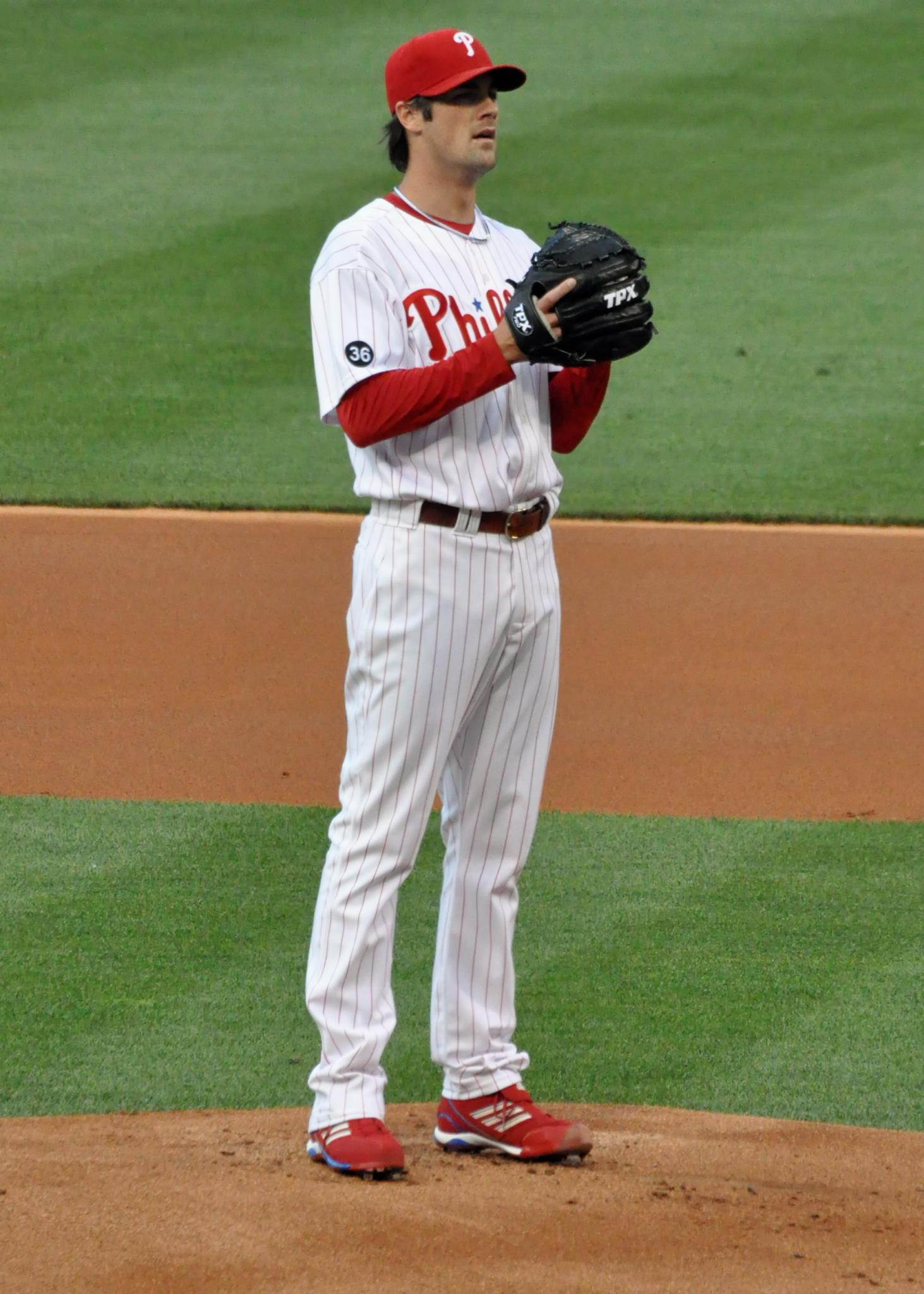
Cole Hamels, the 2008 National League Championship Series MVP, closed out the 2010 NLDS with a complete-game shutout over Cincinnati.

Having clinched the National League's best record, the Phillies were the top seed entering the playoffs; since the wild card winner cannot face a team from their own division in the Division Series, Philadelphia played the third-seeded Cincinnati Reds in the first round of the postseason. In the first game, Roy Halladay threw the second no-hitter of his career, his second of the season, and the first in National League postseason history, blanking the Reds, 4–0, in his first career playoff start. He became the second pitcher to throw a no-hitter in the postseason (Don Larsen, 1956) and the first pitcher to throw two no-hitters in a single season since Nolan Ryan in 1973. In the second game, the Reds' Brandon Phillips had three hits, including a double and a home run against Philadelphia starting pitcher Roy Oswalt, but also committed two of Cincinnati's four errors. The errors allowed the Phillies to score five unearned runs to take a 7–4 victory over the Reds and a 2–0 lead in the series. Displaying the form he showed in 2008 when he won the League Championship Series and World Series Most Valuable Player Awards, Cole Hamels pitched a complete-game shutout in the third game of the series to clinch the Phillies' spot in the National League Championship Series. Philadelphia's pitchers set a Division Series record, allowing only 11 hits in 3 games, better than the 1998 New York Yankees' 13 allowed to the Texas Rangers.

Game 1

| Team | 1 | 2 | 3 | 4 | 5 | 6 | 7 | 8 | 9 | R | H | E |
|---|---|---|---|---|---|---|---|---|---|---|---|---|
| Cincinnati | 0 | 0 | 0 | 0 | 0 | 0 | 0 | 0 | 0 | 0 | 0 | 1 |
| Philadelphia | 1 | 3 | 0 | 0 | 0 | 0 | 0 | 0 | x | 4 | 5 | 0 |
Starting pitchers: CIN: Edinson Vólquez (0–0); PHI: Roy Halladay (0–0); WP: Halladay (1–0) LP: Volquez (0–1); Home runs: CIN: none PHI: none

Game 2

| Team | 1 | 2 | 3 | 4 | 5 | 6 | 7 | 8 | 9 | R | H | E |
|---|---|---|---|---|---|---|---|---|---|---|---|---|
| Cincinnati | 1 | 1 | 0 | 1 | 1 | 0 | 0 | 0 | 0 | 4 | 6 | 4 |
| Philadelphia | 0 | 0 | 0 | 0 | 2 | 1 | 3 | 1 | x | 7 | 8 | 2 |
Starting pitchers: CIN: Bronson Arroyo (0–0); PHI: Roy Oswalt (0–0); WP: José Contreras (1–0) LP: Aroldis Chapman (0–1) Sv: Brad Lidge (1); Home runs: CIN: Brandon Phillips (1), Jay Bruce (1); PHI: none

Game 3

| Team | 1 | 2 | 3 | 4 | 5 | 6 | 7 | 8 | 9 | R | H | E |
|---|---|---|---|---|---|---|---|---|---|---|---|---|
| Philadelphia | 1 | 0 | 0 | 0 | 1 | 0 | 0 | 0 | 0 | 2 | 8 | 1 |
| Cincinnati | 0 | 0 | 0 | 0 | 0 | 0 | 0 | 0 | 0 | 0 | 5 | 2 |
Starting pitchers: PHI: Cole Hamels (0–0); CIN: Johnny Cueto (0–0); WP: Hamels (1–0) LP: Cueto (0–1); Home runs: PHI: Chase Utley (1); CIN: none

=== National League Championship Series ===
Having collected a 22–10 record against the National League West during the season, the Phillies faced off against that division's champions, the San Francisco Giants—with whom they split the season series, 3–3—in the National League Championship Series. Game 1 "had been hyped incessantly because of the matchup between Halladay and Giants ace Tim Lincecum", and the game ended as a 4–3 victory for the Giants. All of the game's offense was generated via the home run, with San Francisco's Cody Ross hitting two solo home runs against Halladay. The second game matched Oswalt against Jonathan Sánchez; Philadelphia's starting pitcher allowed one run through eight innings and scored a run sliding in the seventh after running through third base coach Sam Perlozzo's "stop" sign. The final score was 6–1, with San Francisco's only run coming on Ross' third solo home run of the series. In Game 3, Philadelphia was shut out in the postseason for the sixth time in franchise history; Ross batted in another run to score Édgar Rentería as the Giants defeated the Phillies, 3–0. The Phillies went 0-for-5 with baserunners in scoring position. The following night, manager Charlie Manuel started Joe Blanton, as planned—instead of Halladay, who would have pitched on short rest—and the Phillies dropped their second consecutive contest. Philadelphia took a 4–2 lead in the fifth inning when Victorino singled to center field to score Ben Francisco, but San Francisco came back to take a 5–4 lead in the sixth. After the Phillies tied the game, Oswalt pitched the bottom of the ninth inning in relief and gave up a walk-off sacrifice fly to Juan Uribe. With one loss standing between the Phillies and elimination, Halladay took the mound for Game 5. Although he pulled a groin muscle during the second inning, he completed six innings of work and Philadelphia defeated the Giants, 4–2. The pitcher also sacrificed baserunners to second and third bases with no one out in the third with a bunt "that rolled over home plate", setting up the Phillies' first runs of the game.

Game 1

| Team | 1 | 2 | 3 | 4 | 5 | 6 | 7 | 8 | 9 | R | H | E |
|---|---|---|---|---|---|---|---|---|---|---|---|---|
| San Francisco | 0 | 0 | 1 | 0 | 1 | 2 | 0 | 0 | 0 | 4 | 9 | 0 |
| Philadelphia | 0 | 0 | 1 | 0 | 0 | 2 | 0 | 0 | 0 | 3 | 7 | 0 |
Starting pitchers: SFG: Tim Lincecum (1–0); PHI: Halladay (1–0); WP: Lincecum (2–0) LP: Halladay (1–1); Home runs: SFG: Ross 2 (2); PHI: Carlos Ruiz (1), Jayson Werth (1)

Game 2

| Team | 1 | 2 | 3 | 4 | 5 | 6 | 7 | 8 | 9 | R | H | E |
|---|---|---|---|---|---|---|---|---|---|---|---|---|
| San Francisco | 0 | 0 | 0 | 0 | 1 | 0 | 0 | 0 | 0 | 1 | 4 | 1 |
| Philadelphia | 1 | 0 | 0 | 0 | 1 | 0 | 4 | 0 | x | 6 | 8 | 0 |
Starting pitchers: SFG: Jonathan Sánchez (0–0); PHI: Oswalt (0–0); WP: Oswalt (1–0) LP: Sánchez (0–1); Home runs: SFG: Ross (3); PHI: none

Game 3

| Team | 1 | 2 | 3 | 4 | 5 | 6 | 7 | 8 | 9 | R | H | E |
|---|---|---|---|---|---|---|---|---|---|---|---|---|
| Philadelphia | 0 | 0 | 0 | 0 | 0 | 0 | 0 | 0 | 0 | 0 | 3 | 0 |
| San Francisco | 0 | 0 | 0 | 2 | 1 | 0 | 0 | 0 | x | 3 | 5 | 0 |
Starting pitchers: PHI: Hamels (1–0); SFG: Matt Cain (0–0); WP: Cain (1–0) LP: Hamels (1–1); Home runs: PHI: none SFG: none

Game 4

| Team | 1 | 2 | 3 | 4 | 5 | 6 | 7 | 8 | 9 | R | H | E |
|---|---|---|---|---|---|---|---|---|---|---|---|---|
| Philadelphia | 0 | 0 | 0 | 0 | 4 | 0 | 0 | 1 | 0 | 5 | 9 | 1 |
| San Francisco | 1 | 0 | 1 | 0 | 1 | 2 | 0 | 0 | 1 | 6 | 11 | 0 |
Starting pitchers: PHI: Joe Blanton (0–0); SFG: Madison Bumgarner (1–0); WP: Brian Wilson (1–0) LP: Oswalt (1–1); Home runs: PHI: none SFG: none

Game 5

| Team | 1 | 2 | 3 | 4 | 5 | 6 | 7 | 8 | 9 | R | H | E |
|---|---|---|---|---|---|---|---|---|---|---|---|---|
| Philadelphia | 0 | 0 | 3 | 0 | 0 | 0 | 0 | 0 | 1 | 4 | 6 | 1 |
| San Francisco | 1 | 0 | 0 | 1 | 0 | 0 | 0 | 0 | 0 | 2 | 7 | 2 |
WP: Roy Halladay (1–1) LP: Tim Lincecum (1–1) Sv: Brad Lidge (1); Home runs: PHI: Jayson Werth (2); SF: None

Game 6

| Team | 1 | 2 | 3 | 4 | 5 | 6 | 7 | 8 | 9 | R | H | E |
|---|---|---|---|---|---|---|---|---|---|---|---|---|
| San Francisco | 0 | 0 | 2 | 0 | 0 | 0 | 0 | 1 | 0 | 3 | 13 | 0 |
| Philadelphia | 2 | 0 | 0 | 0 | 0 | 0 | 0 | 0 | 0 | 2 | 8 | 1 |
WP: Javier López (1-0) LP: Ryan Madson (0-1) Sv: Brian Wilson (3); Home runs: SF: Juan Uribe (1); PHI: None

== Awards ==
Roy Halladay won the Baseball America Major League Player of the Year, the Best Major League Baseball Player ESPY Award (2011; presented in June 2011, for his performance since June 2010), the "This Year in Baseball Awards" Starting Pitcher of the Year, the NL Cy Young Award, the Players Choice Awards NL Outstanding Pitcher, the Baseball Prospectus Internet Baseball Awards NL Cy Young, the NLBM Wilbur "Bullet" Rogan Legacy Award (NL Pitcher of the Year), the Sporting News NL Pitcher of the Year Award, and the USA Today NL Cy Young. He also received the MLB Clutch Performer of the Year Award, the Heart & Hustle Award, and the "This Year in Baseball Awards" Postseason Moment of the Year. He was also named the Sporting News Pro Athlete of the Year, the Daily News Sportsperson of the Year, and the Philadelphia Sports Writers Association Pro Athlete of the Year In summer 2011, he received the John Wanamaker Athletic Award from the Philadelphia Sports Congress, based on his performance during the 2010 calendar year.

Shane Victorino won his third consecutive NL Rawlings Gold Glove Award. Chase Utley won the Fielding Bible Award at second base. Carlos Ruiz was named the "This Year in Baseball Awards" X-Factor Player of the Year and received the Pride of Philadelphia Award. Victorino also received the Philadelphia Sports Writers Association Humanitarian Award. Brad Lidge won the Frank Slocum Big B.A.T. Award for "an individual or a group of individuals whose exemplary service to the [MLB Baseball Assistance Team (B.A.T.)] organization has helped provide dignity and self-esteem to members of the Baseball Family."

The Philadelphia chapter of the Baseball Writers' Association of America (BBWAA) presented its annual franchise awards to Ryan Howard ("Mike Schmidt Most Valuable Player Award"), Roy Halladay ("Steve Carlton Most Valuable Pitcher Award"), Roy Halladay ("Dallas Green Special Achievement Award"), and Shane Victorino ("Tug McGraw Good Guy Award").

Charlie Manuel won the Chuck Tanner Major League Baseball Manager of the Year Award.

== Footnotes ==
- ^{a} Jamie Moyer (47 years, 170 days) became the oldest pitcher in Major League Baseball history to throw a shutout.
- ^{b} Roy Halladay became the 20th pitcher in Major League Baseball history to throw a perfect game.
- ^{c} Jamie Moyer broke the record for most home runs allowed in Major League Baseball (506).

== Farm system ==
| Level | Team | League | Manager |
|---|---|---|---|
| AAA | Lehigh Valley IronPigs | International League | Dave Huppert |
| AA | Reading Phillies | Eastern League | Steve Roadcap |
| A | Clearwater Threshers | Florida State League | Dusty Wathan |
| A | Lakewood BlueClaws | South Atlantic League | Mark Parent |
| A-Short Season | Williamsport Crosscutters | New York–Penn League | Chris Truby |
| Rookie | GCL Phillies | Gulf Coast League | Roly de Armas |

LEAGUE CHAMPIONS: Lakewood, GCL Phillies
