= Wilson Valdez =

Dominican baseball player (born 1978)

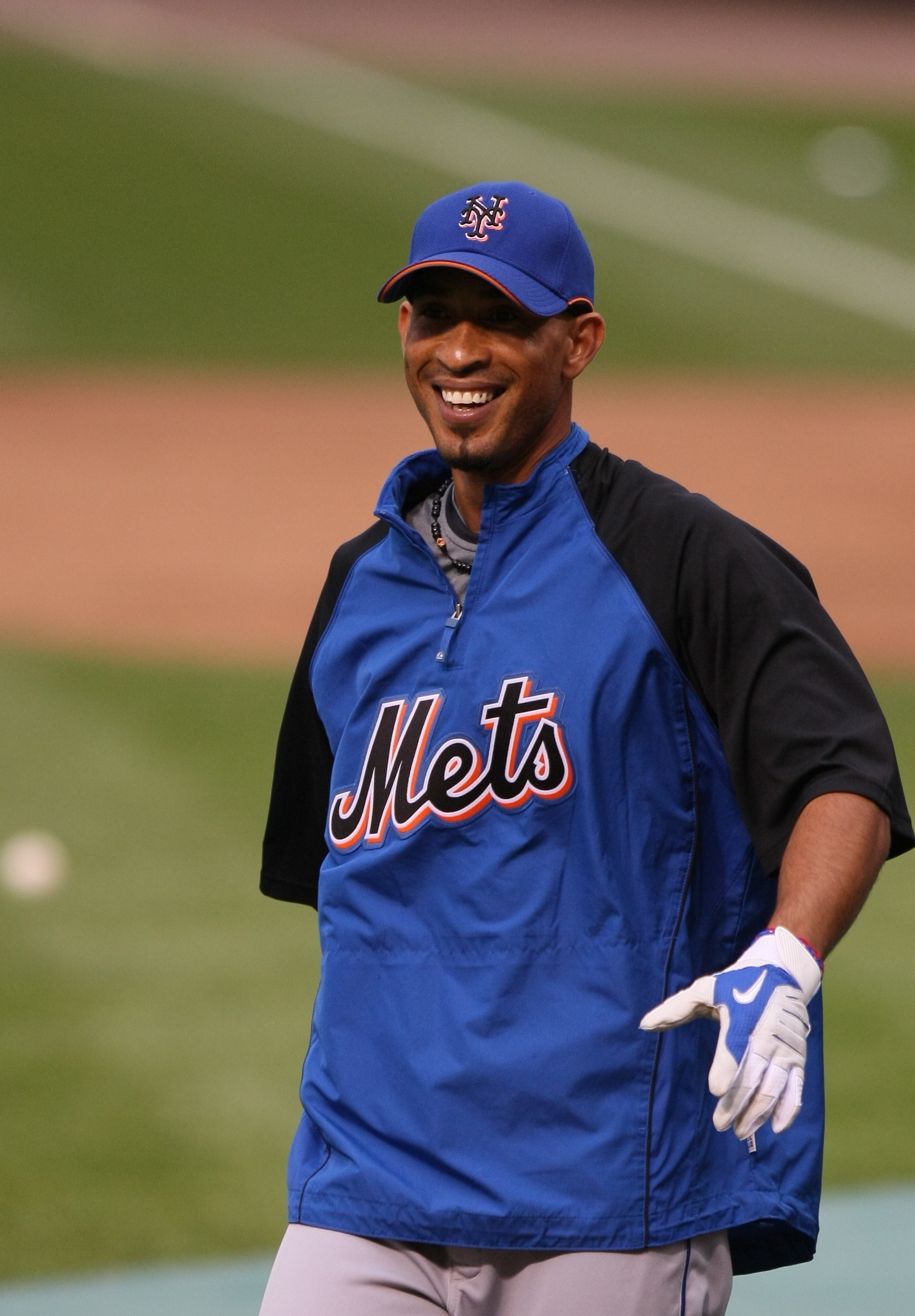
- Valdez with the New York Mets in 2009
- Infielder
- Born: May 20, 1978 (age 47); Nizao, Peravia, Dominican Republic
- Batted: Right Threw: Right

MLB debut
- September 7, 2004, for the Chicago White Sox

Last MLB appearance
- October 3, 2012, for the Cincinnati Reds

MLB statistics
- Batting average: .236
- Home runs: 6
- Runs batted in: 107
- Stats at Baseball Reference

Teams
- Chicago White Sox (2004); Seattle Mariners (2005); San Diego Padres (2005); Los Angeles Dodgers (2007); Kia Tigers (2008); Tokyo Yakult Swallows (2008); New York Mets (2009); Philadelphia Phillies (2010–2011); Cincinnati Reds (2012)

Wilson Antonio Valdez (born May 20, 1978) is a Dominican former professional baseball infielder. He played for the Chicago White Sox, Seattle Mariners, San Diego Padres, Los Angeles Dodgers, New York Mets, Philadelphia Phillies, and Cincinnati Reds of Major League Baseball, the Kia Tigers of the KBO League, and the Tokyo Yakult Swallows of Nippon Professional Baseball from 2004 to 2012.

== Playing career ==
=== Early career ===
Valdez was signed as an undrafted free agent by the Montreal Expos on February 4, 1997. He played on the Expos' Dominican League teams from 1997-1999 and then on various minor league Single-A teams for the Expos through 2001.

On March 29, 2002, the Florida Marlins claimed Valdez off waivers and sent him to the Marlins' Double-A Portland Sea Dogs. He continued in the Marlins organization in 2003, playing with their Double-A Carolina Mudcats and their Triple-A Albuquerque Isotopes.

=== Chicago White Sox ===
On June 17, 2004, while hitting .319 for Albuquerque, he was traded by the Marlins with cash to the Chicago White Sox in exchange for reliever Billy Koch. The White Sox promptly assigned him to their Triple-A affiliate in Charlotte where he hit .302 and earned his first major-league call-up in September of 2004 to the White Sox. On September 26, 2004, he hit his first career home run off Brian Anderson. In limited action he hit .233 for the Sox.

=== Seattle Mariners to San Diego Padres ===
After the season, he was waived by the White Sox and claimed by the Seattle Mariners. He started the 2005 season as the starting shortstop for the Mariners. However, he hit only .198 and was traded to the San Diego Padres on June 9, 2005. After a stint with the Padres' Triple-A team in Portland, he returned to the major leagues with the Padres, hitting .231 in August as a utility player.

=== Los Angeles Dodgers ===
After the 2005 season, he was released by the Padres and signed to a minor league contract by the Kansas City Royals, who promptly traded him to the Los Angeles Dodgers during spring training.

On April 29, 2007, he scored the game-winning run in a game against the San Diego Padres that lasted 17 innings. He spent the 2006 season with the Dodgers' Triple-A team, the Las Vegas 51s, where he hit .297 and stole 26 bases.

=== Korea & Japan ===
In 2007, a spring-training injury to the Dodgers' starting shortstop Rafael Furcal created an opening-day roster spot for Valdez and he got plenty of playing time early for the Dodgers. After a quick start, however, he quickly cooled and was returned to the 51s. On January 3, 2008, Valdez's contract was sold to the Kia Tigers of the Korea Baseball Organization. On June 9, he signed with the Tokyo Yakult Swallows of Japan's Nippon Professional Baseball.

=== New York Mets ===
In December 2008, Valdez signed a minor league contract with the Cleveland Indians. On May 26, 2009, he was traded to the New York Mets and was added to the major league roster. On June 22, 2009, he was designated for assignment.

=== Philadelphia Phillies ===
On November 25, 2009, Valdez signed a minor league contract with the Philadelphia Phillies and was optioned to the Triple-A Lehigh Valley IronPigs. The Phillies selected his contract from the minors on April 14, 2010, as a reserve infielder, when Jimmy Rollins went on the disabled list. When backup Juan Castro was injured, Valdez became the Phillies' starting shortstop for a few weeks in the beginning of the season. On May 17, Rollins was activated from the disabled list (DL) and the Phillies designated Valdez for assignment, but re-activated him five days later when Rollins returned to the DL. In addition to playing shortstop, Valdez filled in at second base for Chase Utley while he was on the disabled list with a hand injury.

On July 29, in a game against the Arizona Diamondbacks, Valdez hit a one-out, walk-off single to score Cody Ransom from second base and give the Phillies a 3–2 win.

In 2010, Valdez set career highs in games, at bats, runs, hits, total bases, doubles, triples, home runs, runs batted in, bases on balls, intentional base on balls, strike outs, stolen bases, slugging percentage and on-base plus slugging percentage (OPS).

In a game started against the Cincinnati Reds on May 25, 2011, (which did not conclude until May 26), Valdez switched from second base to pitcher in the 19th inning, pitching one inning and allowing no runs. This was the first time he had ever pitched in a major league game. When the Phillies won in the bottom of the 19th inning, he was credited with the win. Valdez thus became the first position player to earn a win since catcher Brent Mayne won a game for the Colorado Rockies in 2000, and just the second since 1968. According to Elias Sports Bureau, Valdez was the first player to start a game in the field and end up as the winning pitcher since Babe Ruth did so on October 1, 1921. The next and thus far most recent position player to record a win was Chris Davis, who did so in the 2012 season, although he did not start in the field, having been the starting designated hitter instead.

=== Cincinnati Reds ===
On January 25, 2012, Valdez was traded to the Cincinnati Reds in exchange for left handed pitcher Jeremy Horst. In 77 games with the Reds, Valdez hit .206/.236/.227 with 15 RBI and 3 stolen bases. He made 44 starts, 27 at shortstop. On November 8, Valdez elected free agency.

=== San Francisco Giants ===
He signed a minor league contract with the San Francisco Giants in December 2012.

=== Miami Marlins ===
On March 23, 2013, he signed a minor league contract with the Miami Marlins with an invitation to spring training.

=== Camden Riversharks ===
On May 25, 2013, he signed a contract with the Camden Riversharks of the Atlantic League.

=== York Revolution ===
On February 21, 2014, he signed a contract with the York Revolution of the Atlantic League. He became a free agent after the 2015 season.
