= 2009 Philadelphia Phillies season =

Major League Baseball season

2009 Philadelphia Phillies
- National League champions National League East champions
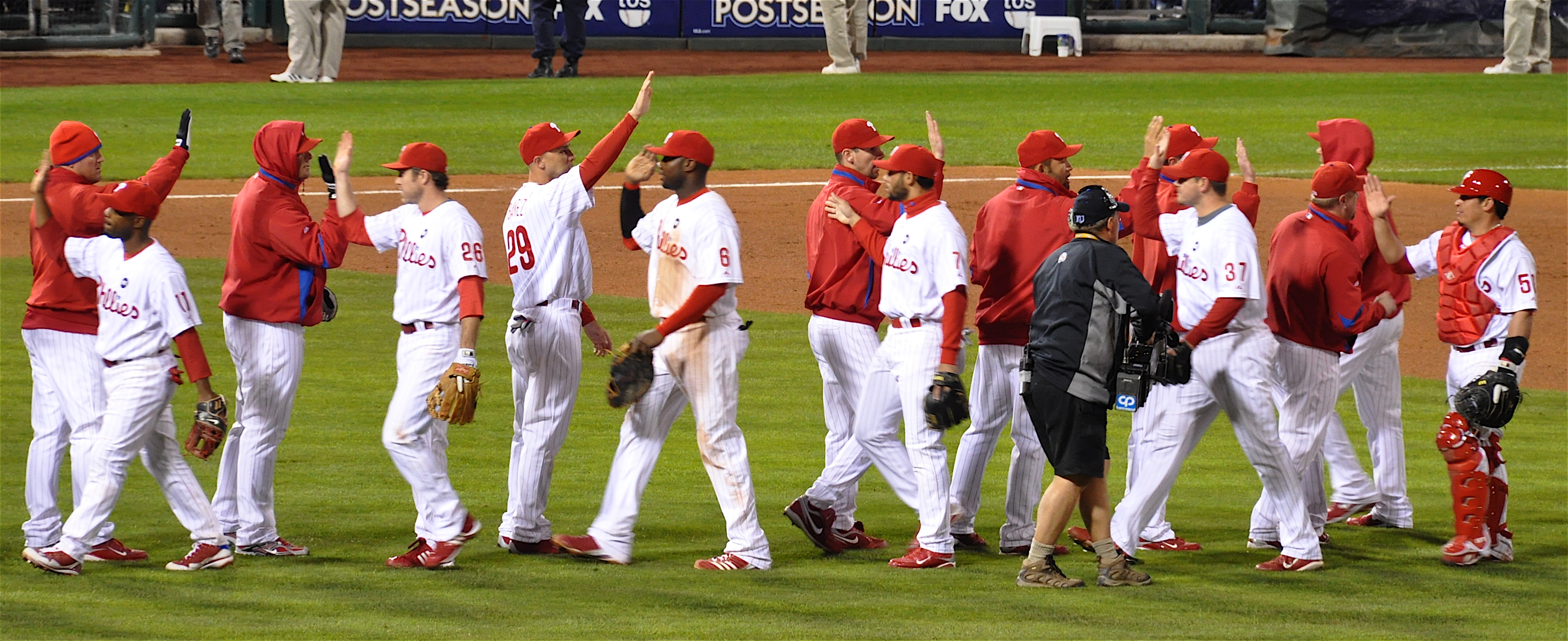
- Phillies players congratulate each other after a win in the 2009 National League Championship Series
- League: National League
- Division: East
- Ballpark: Citizens Bank Park
- City: Philadelphia, Pennsylvania
- Record: 93–69 (.574)
- Divisional place: 1st
- Owners: Bill Giles, David Montgomery, et al.
- General managers: Rubén Amaro, Jr.
- Managers: Charlie Manuel
- Television: Comcast SportsNet Philadelphia, Comcast Network Philadelphia, WPHL-TV (My PHL 17); Harry Kalas through April 12, Chris Wheeler, Gary Matthews, Tom McCarthy
- Radio: WPHT 1210 AM (English) Harry Kalas through April 12, Scott Franzke, Larry Andersen; WUBA 1480 AM (Spanish), Phillies Radio Network

The Philadelphia Phillies' 2009 season was the 127th season in the history of the franchise. The team, managed by Charlie Manuel, began their sixth season at Citizens Bank Park and defense of their 2008 World Series championship on April 5. After collecting a third straight National League East championship, the Phillies won their second consecutive National League (NL) pennant for the first time in franchise history; however they were defeated by the New York Yankees in the World Series.

The Phillies posted a second consecutive winning April to open the season with an 11–9 record, but the month was marred by the death of legendary broadcaster Harry Kalas. After opening the month of May against the rival New York Mets, the Phillies met President Barack Obama to celebrate their World Series victory the previous season and had two rookie pitchers win consecutive starts for the first time since 2007. Starting pitcher Jamie Moyer earned his 250th career win during the month, while first baseman Ryan Howard and outfielder Raúl Ibañez became the first Phillies teammates to hit 10 home runs in the same month. Echoing their strong run in the middle of the 2008 season, the Phillies compiled a 16–4 record in late May and early June, which was countered by weakness during interleague play in late June.

After the team's largest victory of the season (22–1 over the Cincinnati Reds) in early July, five Phillies—Howard, Ibáñez, second baseman Chase Utley, and outfielders Shane Victorino and Jayson Werth—were selected to the All-Star team. July was the team's best showing of the season, as they compiled their first 20-win month since the 2001 season. The Phillies traded for starting pitcher Cliff Lee at the end of the month to bolster their starting rotation, who won his first five starts with the team, and signed free-agent pitcher Pedro Martínez. In August, Eric Bruntlett turned the first game-ending unassisted triple play in NL history and the second in team history. The following month, the team clinched its third consecutive division championship on September 30, becoming the first Phillies team to make a third straight playoff appearance since the 1976–1978 Phillies.

Philadelphia defeated the Colorado Rockies in the NL Division Series, 3–1, and the Los Angeles Dodgers in the NL Championship Series (NLCS) for the second consecutive year, 4–1. Howard was named the most valuable player of the NLCS. The Phillies were defeated by the Yankees in the World Series, 4–2.

Statistical leaders^{[A]} in batting for the team included Victorino (batting average, .292), Howard (home runs, 45; runs batted in, 141), and Utley (runs scored, 112). For his season accomplishments, Utley won his fourth consecutive Silver Slugger Award. Pitching leaders included right-handed starting pitcher Joe Blanton (innings pitched, 195 1/3), left-handed starter J. A. Happ (win–loss record, 12–4), and closer Brad Lidge (saves, 31). Victorino and shortstop Jimmy Rollins also won Gold Glove Awards for their defense.

== Offseason ==
=== Departures ===
On November 4, 2008, following the World Series, the Phillies released third base coach Steve Smith. He had been with the team for two years. The Phillies were expected to have the remaining coaches to return for the 2009 season. However, bench coach Jimy Williams opted not to return to the Phillies, notifying the team on November 10. Charlie Manuel had expected Williams to return for the 2009 season and was surprised that he declined. However, Williams left the team on good terms, and Manuel stated that he was welcome to come back to the Phillies if he changed his mind. Left fielder Pat Burrell became a free agent at the end of the 2008 season, signing with the Tampa Bay Rays, whom the Phillies had defeated in the World Series, on January 5. The team did not tender an offer to Burrell following eight seasons. The Phillies also released outfielder So Taguchi on November 5. Taguchi had served as a pinch hitter and defensive replacement for the Phillies in 2008. Eric Bruntlett replaced Taguchi for the latter half of the 2008 season. Relief pitcher Tom Gordon also filed for free agency, ultimately signing with the Arizona Diamondbacks.

=== Arrivals ===
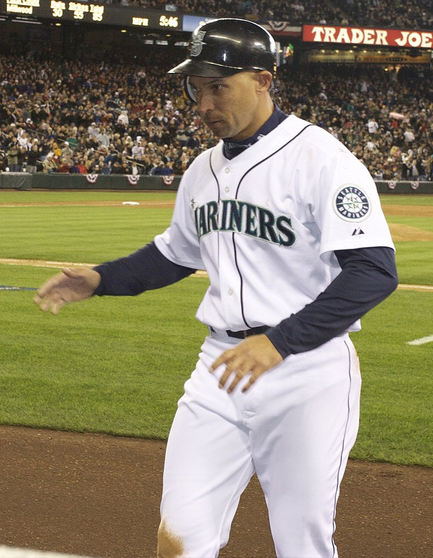
Raúl Ibañez signed a three-year contract with the Phillies in December 2008.

On November 3, the Phillies named Rubén Amaro, Jr. to be the general manager after Pat Gillick retired at the end of a three-year contract. Amaro previously had a long history with the Phillies, serving as a bat boy in the 1980s, a player in the 1990s, and as assistant general manager for the Phillies from 1998 until his appointment as general manager. Gillick remained with the Phillies as an advisor. On November 13, Sam Perlozzo joined the Phillies as third base coach and fielding/infield coach after spending 2008 in the same role for the Seattle Mariners. Perlozzo previously served as the third base coach for the New York Mets, the Cincinnati Reds, and as third base coach, bench coach, and manager for the Baltimore Orioles. Another former manager, Pete Mackanin, was named the team's new bench coach on November 21; he had been interim manager for the Reds when Jerry Narron was fired in Cincinnati in 2007. On November 28, the Phillies signed Mike Koplove Koplove, a right-handed relief pitcher, was optioned to the Triple-A Lehigh Valley IronPigs at the end of spring training. On December 16, Raúl Ibañez agreed to play left field for the Phillies in a three-year, $31.5 million deal. South Korean pitcher Chan Ho Park officially signed a one-year contract to join the Phillies on January 6, after agreeing to a deal in principle in December. Park was originally signed as an insurance policy for the bullpen, as reliever J. C. Romero was assigned a fifty-game suspension after violating the MLB drug policy, but won the fifth starter's job in spring training.

=== Retentions ===
Left-handed reliever Scott Eyre re-signed with the Phillies after becoming a vital part of the bullpen during the stretch run. The Phillies re-signed left-handed starter Jamie Moyer on December 15 after lengthy negotiations. The 46-year-old Moyer was inked to a two-year contract to return to the Phillies and kept a key part of the Phillies' postseason rotation intact. The team also avoided salary arbitration with first baseman Ryan Howard's three-year contract.

=== Injuries ===
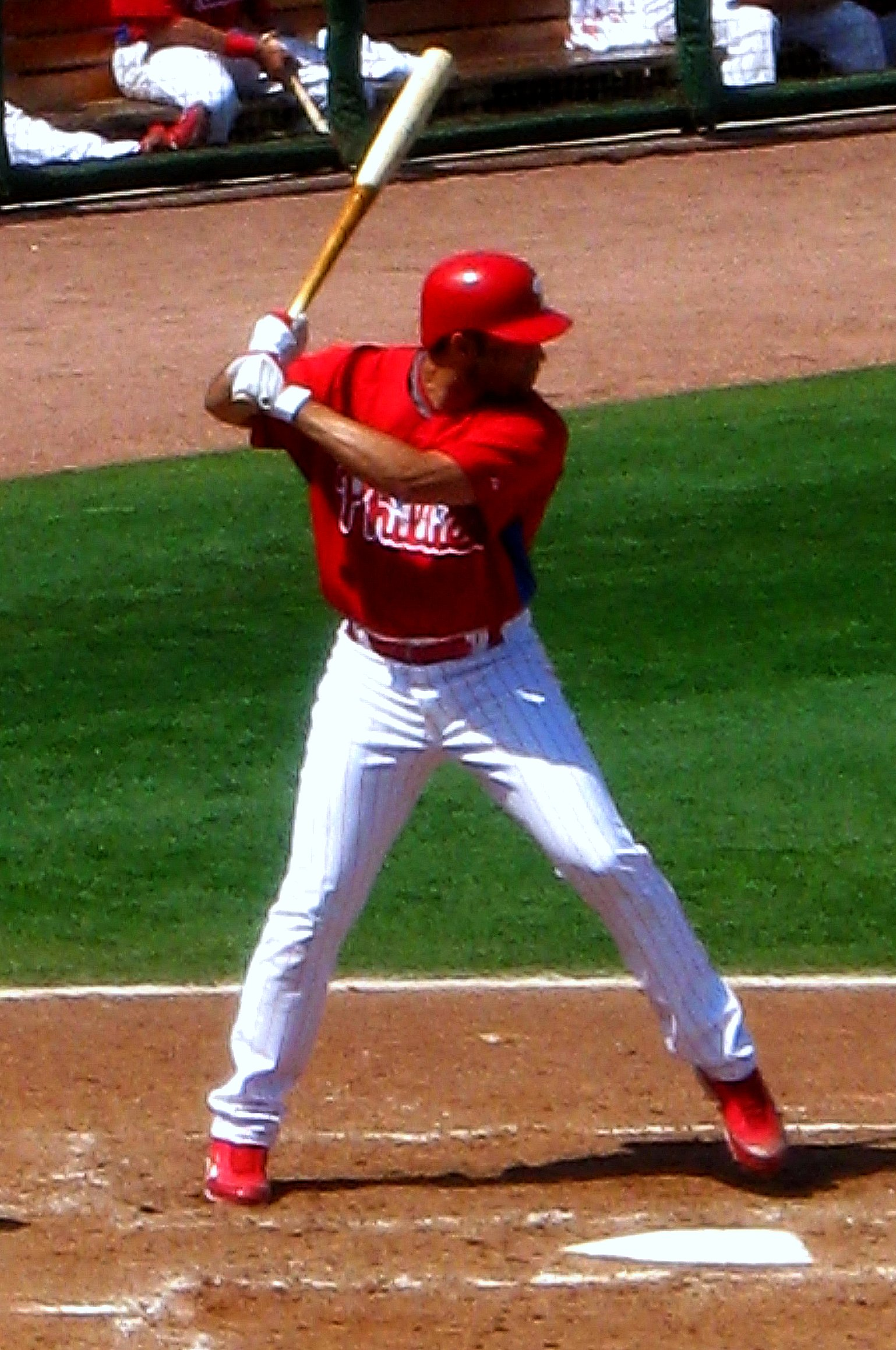
Chase Utley and Pedro Feliz (pictured) both had offseason surgeries after the 2008 World Series.

On November 20, second baseman Chase Utley had hip surgery and was scheduled to be out for four-to-six months. However, on December 15, Utley said in a press conference that he could be ready for Opening Night. Just under four months later, Utley made his first pre-season game appearance in an intersquad game March 14, and his first appearance in actual game competition the next day against the St. Louis Cardinals. Third baseman Pedro Feliz also had surgery on his back to repair a herniated disc on the same day as Utley. Feliz officially returned to spring training action on March 13. During spring training, starting pitcher Cole Hamels left training camp on March 16 and flew to Philadelphia to have his left elbow examined by Dr. Michael Ciccotti. Hamels had felt tightness between innings and after he finished pitching. "This will obviously set me back a couple of days, and I don't think that should be a big deal", said Hamels. However, the injury threw his Opening Night start into doubt, even though Ciccotti found no structural damage in his arm; Brett Myers was announced as Hamels' replacement to start Opening Night.

== Spring training ==
On November 13, the Phillies announced their spring training schedule. In addition to their Grapefruit League games, the Phillies played two games against two World Baseball Classic teams. The Phillies defeated Canada (with Phillie Matt Stairs) on March 4, 9–2, and lost to the U.S. (with Jimmy Rollins and Shane Victorino) on March 5, 9–6. The team broke camp April 2 and headed north to play two "On Deck Series" games on April 3 and 4 against the Tampa Bay Rays at Citizens Bank Park; they split the series, winning 3–2 and losing 9–7.

The Phillies finished the preseason with a record of 13–19, 10 games behind the Grapefruit League-leading New York Yankees. Ryan Howard led all players in spring training with 10 home runs. The team set spring training attendance records for Bright House Field. They set a single-game record with 10,335 people in attendance on March 15 for a game against the Cardinals. The Phillies set the franchise's total spring training attendance record for Bright House Field, with 133,620 attending.

== Regular season ==
=== April ===
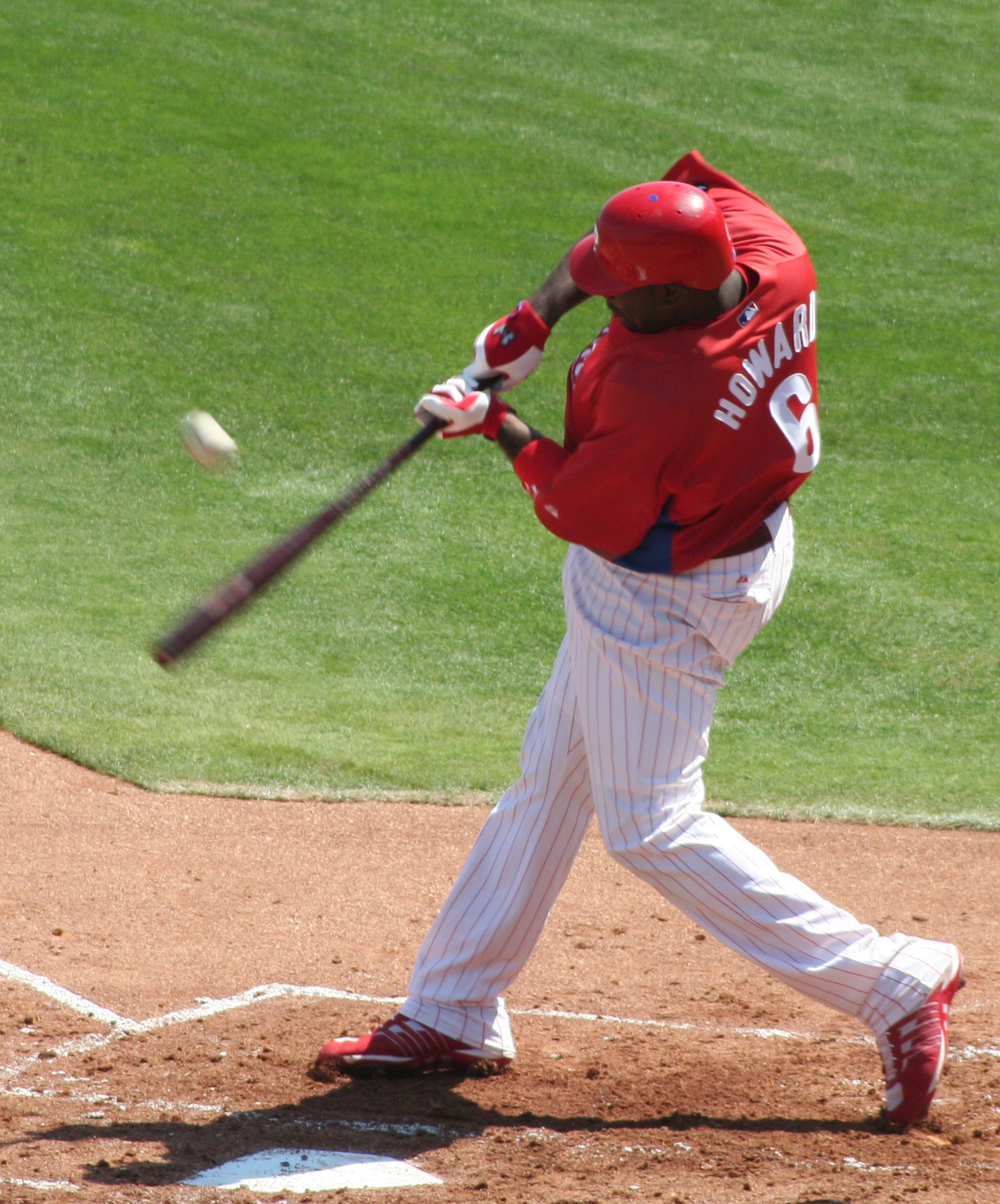
Ryan Howard (pictured) and Raúl Ibañez hit grand slams in the same game against the Washington Nationals.

The Phillies began their 2009 season in front of a sold-out crowd of 44,532 at Citizens Bank Park on April 5, playing against the Atlanta Braves. The Phillies, originally scheduled to play in the afternoon of April 6, earned the distinction of playing the opening game of the entire 2009 Major League Baseball (MLB) season after winning the 2008 World Series. They lost the opener 4–1 to the division-rival Braves, whose new ace, Derek Lowe, pitched eight shutout innings. The Phillies lost the next game, and were in danger of losing the following night and dropping to 0–3 before scoring eight runs in the bottom of the seventh inning for a 12–11 comeback win. The Phillies lost their first game in Denver, but came from behind again in their next two games to take the second series from the Colorado Rockies. The Phillies defeated the Washington Nationals in the opener of their third series, just hours after the death of Hall of Fame broadcaster Harry Kalas, but lost the third scheduled game of the series after the second was cancelled due to poor weather. In their series against the San Diego Padres, the Phillies dropped the first two games as well; during the second game, closer Brad Lidge blew his first save with Philadelphia, breaking his streak of 47 consecutive saves extending back to 2007. The Phillies won the Sunday afternoon matinee against the Padres, 5–4, on a walk-off home run by Ibáñez after trailing the entire game.

The Phillies' offense benefited from rest due to the postponement of the final game of the Padres' series, as they defeated the Milwaukee Brewers in the opener of their mid-week series, 11–4. The next two games did not go as smoothly, as the Phillies were shut out through eight innings in the second game and nearly no-hit by Brewers starter Dave Bush in the third game. Phillies starter Cole Hamels was hit by a line drive in the fourth inning and exited the game; before departing, he had retired nine of the ten batters he faced. Hitting the road for a series against the division-leading Florida Marlins, the Phillies were shut out through eight innings in the first game of the series before scoring seven runs in the top of the ninth against power-throwing closer Matt Lindstrom, winning the game, 7–3 on Shane Victorino's first career regular season grand slam. The following night's game offered another come-from-behind win, as they trailed in the ninth again to win in extra innings, 6–4, and the 13–2 victory on April 26 capped the team's first series sweep. Hosting Washington for their second series against the Nationals, the Phillies fell behind in the seventh inning before a grand slam by Ibáñez capped their 13–11 victory; combined with Ryan Howard's game-tying grand slam in the fifth inning, this was only the fourth time in Phillies history that teammates hit grand slams in the same game. The Phillies split the remaining two games of the series with Washington, finishing with an April record of 11–9, their second consecutive winning April.

=== May ===
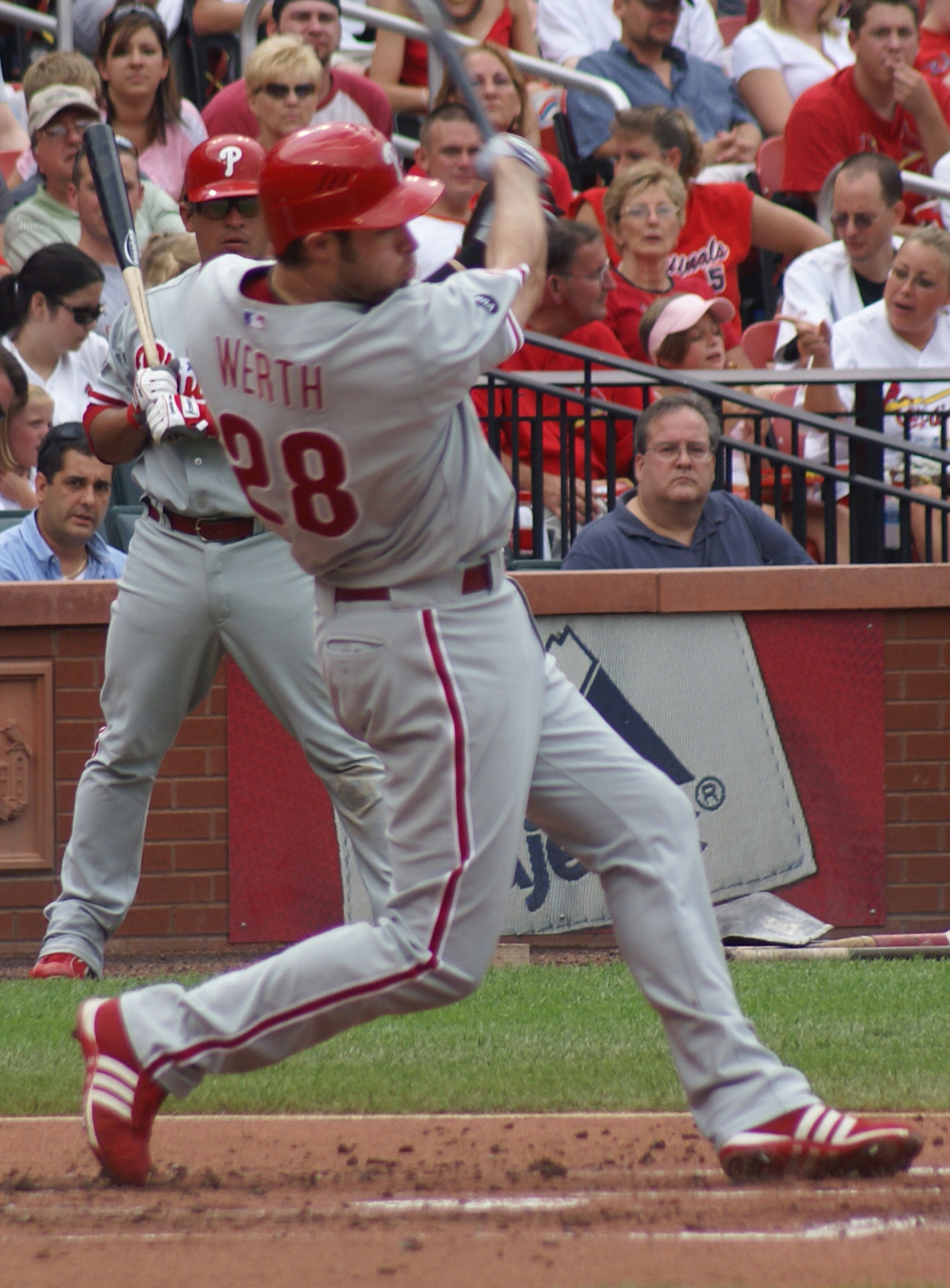
Jayson Werth tied a franchise record with four stolen bases, including home plate, on May 12.

The Phillies opened May against the division-rival New York Mets, losing the opening game of the month, 7–4. Back-to-back walks in the tenth inning of the Saturday afternoon game gave the Phillies their first win of the season over the Mets. After a rainout, the Phillies opened their first series in St. Louis with the Cardinals. They won the first game of the series on Howard's second grand slam in as many weeks after a pitchers' duel between starters Kyle Lohse and Joe Blanton and completed the two-game series sweep with a 10–7 victory on May 5, capped by a Jayson Werth three-run home run and a 4-for-5 performance from Victorino. The Phillies' brief stop in New York was marred by a two-game series sweep; Phillies hitters were shut down by Mets starters Johan Santana and Mike Pelfrey, and closer Francisco Rodríguez recorded saves in both games of the series. The following series was barely better, as the Phillies dropped two games to the Braves.

On May 12, Werth stole four bases, including home plate, tying a Phillies record and leading to a 5–3 win over the Los Angeles Dodgers; however, the series result was the same as the previous one, as the Phillies dropped two games in the set to Los Angeles. Carrying a .500 winning percentage south from Philadelphia to Washington, the team visited the White House and was congratulated by President Barack Obama for their championship the previous season. The visit had been postponed from April 14 due to Kalas' death. After meeting the President, the Phillies opened the series with a second consecutive extra-inning game, defeating the Nationals in 12 innings. Because pitcher J. A. Happ had to enter Friday night's game in relief, the Phillies called up right-handed starting pitcher Andrew Carpenter from Reading to start the second game of Saturday's doubleheader (a make-up of the postponement from April 15). Carpenter earned his first major league win in the rain-shortened second game after Myers earned the win in the afternoon game. Though Sunday's starter Park only pitched 1 1/3 innings, the Phillies swept the series with the Nationals with an 8–6 come-from-behind win, with new call-up Sergio Escalona earning his first major league win. This marked the first time since the 2007 season that rookies had won back-to-back starts for the Phillies (Hamels and Kyle Kendrick). The Phillies took two of three games in each of their next two series with the Cincinnati Reds and the New York Yankees to finish their road trip with an 8–2 record. Though they lost two games against Florida, the final series of the month against Washington resulted in a second straight series sweep, as the Phillies defeated the Nationals in three consecutive games to finish the month with a 17–11 record; the last game of the series was Moyer's 250th career victory. With strong offensive performances in May, Howard and Ibáñez became the first pair of Phillies to hit 10 home runs in the same month.

=== June ===
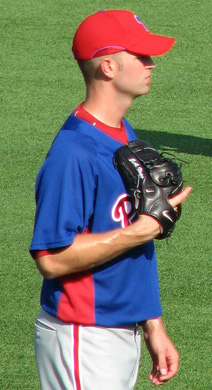
J. A. Happ pitched his first career complete-game shutout on June 27.

The month of June saw the continuation of the Phillies' hot streak; from May 15 to June 4, the team compiled a 16–4 record, culminating with a three-game sweep of the Padres on the Phillies' first trip to the West Coast. In that series, rookie Antonio Bastardo made his major league debut, striking out five batters and allowing one earned run in six innings of work to earn his first career victory. Traveling north to Los Angeles for a rematch of the previous year's playoff series, the Phillies managed a split despite the bullpen's struggles. Lidge blew two saves in consecutive nights, taking the loss in the first game and allowing the game-tying home run in the other. The series was bookended by the team's first shutout of the season, a complete game by Hamels, and a second consecutive strong performance from Bastardo, who pitched five innings and allowed only two runs in a game that ended with a final score of 7–2. The final stop on the road trip was Citi Field, where the Phillies faced off against the Mets. All three games were close, with two one-run wins in the series and two extra-inning victories for the Phillies, won by home runs from Utley and Ibáñez on June 10 and 11.

The team's strong stretch did not continue, however, as the Phillies entered the second period of interleague play with five consecutive series against the American League East. While they managed a single win against the Boston Red Sox, it was followed by a six-game losing streak wherein the Phillies were swept by the Toronto Blue Jays and the Baltimore Orioles; Philadelphia was outscored 38–19 over the two series. The team showed promise in the first game of their World Series rematch series with the Tampa Bay Rays, winning 10–1, but were defeated in the last two games of the series and lost a fourth straight game to Toronto on June 26. However, the Phillies were able to exact a modicum of revenge for both their 1993 World Series defeat and the first series sweep by the Jays by winning the last two games. Happ played the role of stopper by pitching his first career complete-game shutout, and Moyer followed by earning his 252nd victory in the following game. To close the month, the Phillies lost the opener of their next series with the Braves to finish the month with a 10–16 record.

=== July ===
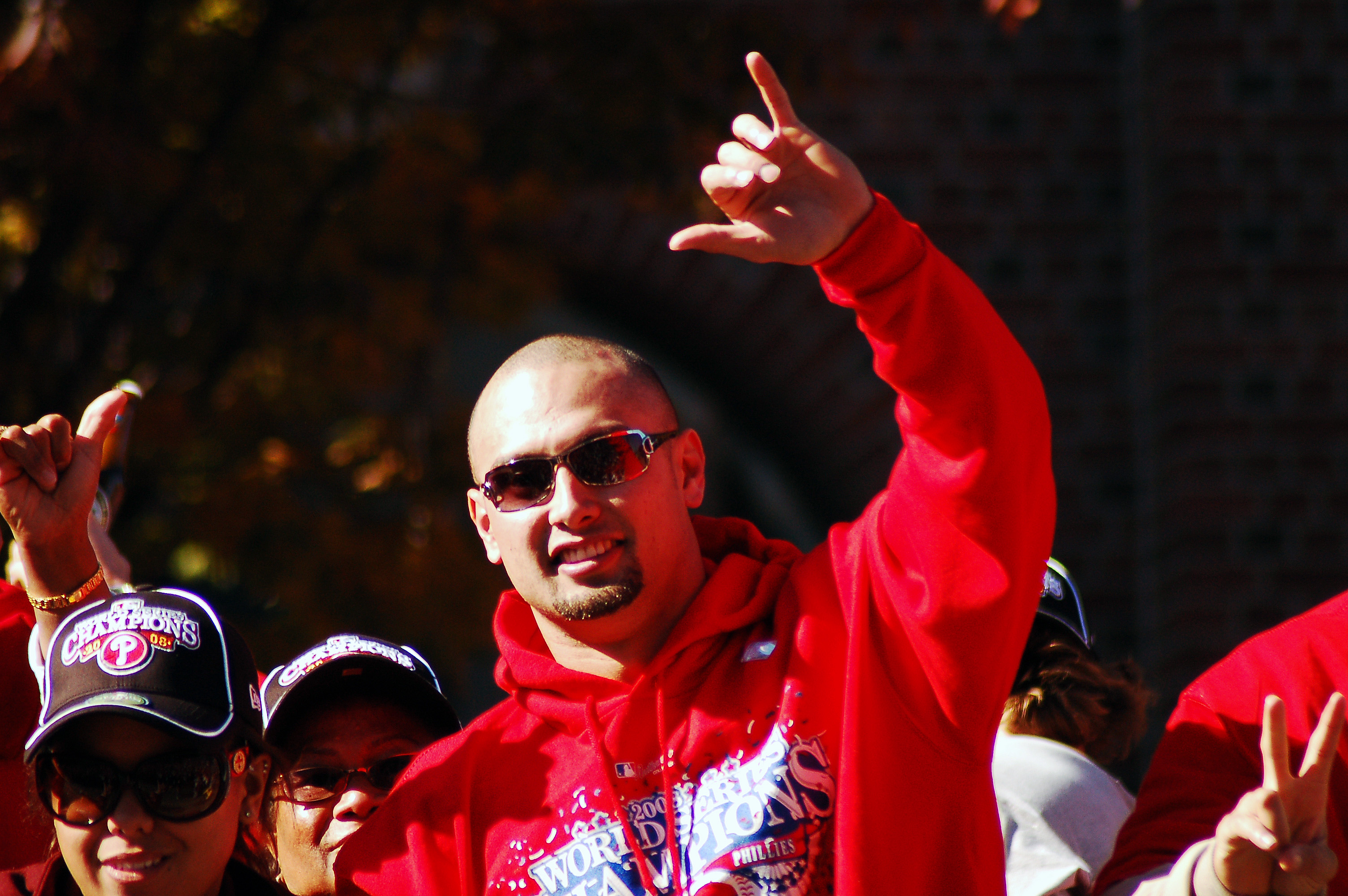
Shane Victorino was named to his first All-Star team as the winner of the Final Vote.

Struggles continued for the Phillies to open July, as the Braves completed a three-game series sweep in the first two days of the month; however, a face-off with the Mets over the Independence Day weekend revitalized the team's fortunes. The Phillies swept their northern rivals as the Mets managed only three runs in three games. During the series, the team's 2009 All-Stars were announced: Utley and Ibáñez were elected as starters, and Howard was named as a reserve, one of four first basemen selected to the National League (NL) squad. It was also announced that Victorino was one of the five Final Vote candidates. Though the Phillies had played much better on the road to this point in the season, home-field advantage paid off the next night, as the offense chased Reds starter Johnny Cueto after 2/3 of an inning by scoring nine runs; the team went on to score 10 in the first inning and 22 in the entire game. Every Phillies starter had at least one hit, Werth hit an eighth-inning grand slam off of Reds infielder Paul Janish, and Rollins and Victorino, at the top of the order, combined to go 7-for-9 with three doubles, a home run, nine runs scored, and five RBIs between them. Though closer Lidge suffered a tough loss on July 7, sacrificing a run in the ninth inning to earn his fourth of the season, the Phillies bounced back with a dramatic ninth-inning win the following night. Victorino hit a walk-off single to drive in Pedro Feliz and solidify his victory in the All-Star Final Vote, which was announced the next day. Werth was named to replace the New York Mets' Carlos Beltrán on the All-Star roster due to injury; Victorino replaced Beltrán as the starter in center field.

After the All-Star break—during which the American League (AL) defeated the NL, 4–3—Moyer, Ryan Madson, and J. C. Romero combined for a one-hit, complete-game shutout of the Marlins in the first game back, extending the Phillies' winning streak to six games, and their record to 10–3 in the month of July. The streak was extended to eight straight games as the Phillies swept Florida in three games of the series (one game was postponed due to weather). Happ raised his record to 7–0 on the season with another seven-inning shutout performance. The streak continued as the Phillies opened a series at home against the Chicago Cubs; Chad Durbin earned his first save in 11 months by pitching three scoreless innings of relief. Werth's three-run home run in the 13th inning the next night gave the Phillies a walk-off win for their tenth consecutive, but Chicago ended the season-high streak with a 10–5 defeat on July 22. The Phillies won three of their next four, and bolstered their rotation by trading for Cliff Lee. The 2008 AL Cy Young Award winner came from the Cleveland Indians along with outfielder Ben Francisco on July 29; the Phillies gave up four minor leaguers—catcher Lou Marson, infielders Jason Donald and pitchers Carlos Carrasco, and Jason Knapp. Lee and Francisco joined the Phillies in San Francisco after the Phillies' series victory over the Arizona Diamondbacks, and both started the final game in July. Lee pitched a complete-game four-hitter on July 31, allowing one run over nine innings of work. The Phillies finished July with a 20–7 record, their first 20-win month since May 2001.

=== August ===
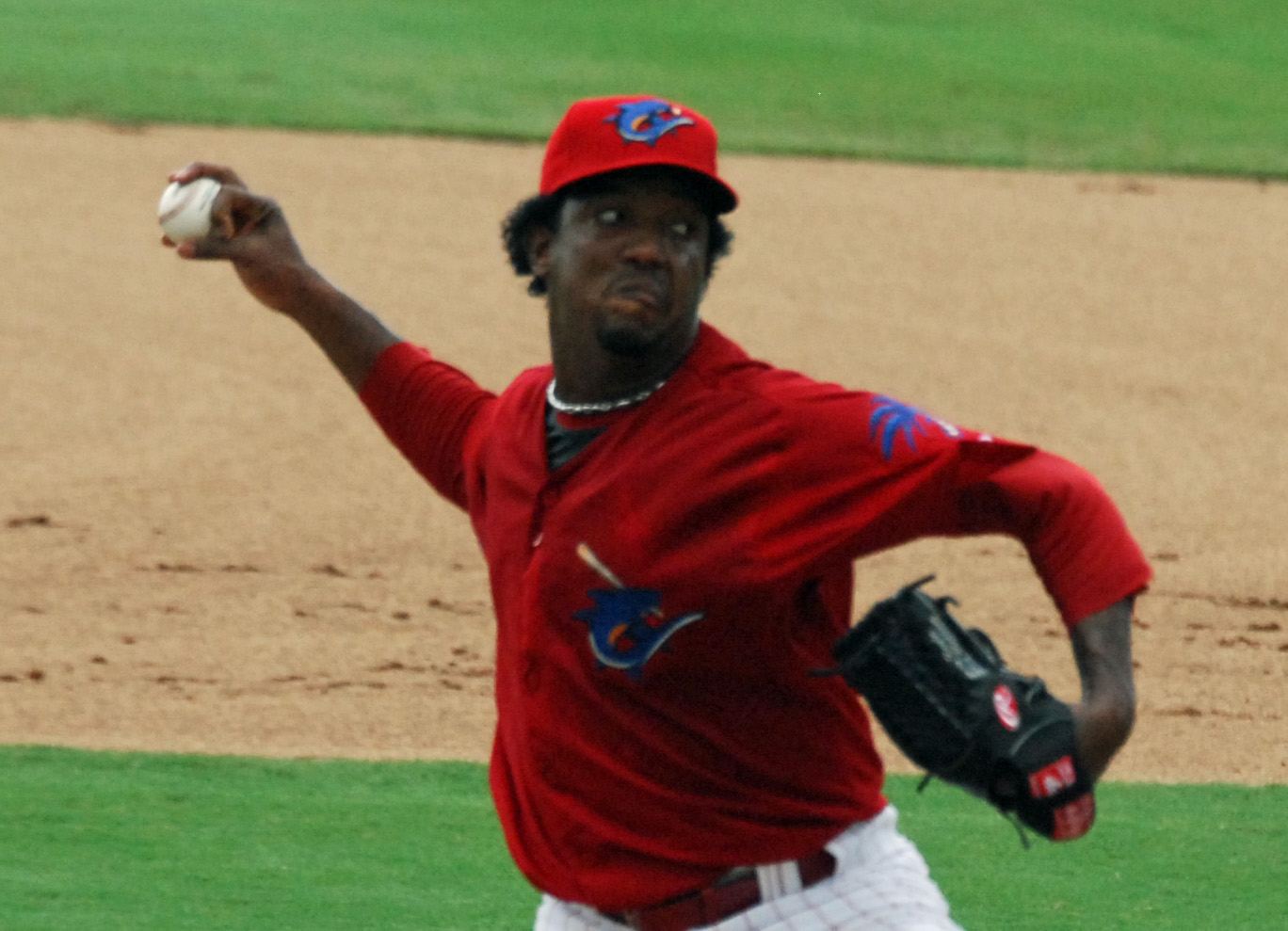
Pedro Martínez joined the rotation in August after Jamie Moyer was demoted to the bullpen.

The Phillies opened the month of August with three straight losses, but the stopper's role again fell to the rookie Happ, who pitched his second shutout of the season—and the second of his career—against the Rockies on August 5. He earned the team's 60th win of the season while allowing four hits and striking out ten batters for the first time in his career. In accordance with his 8–2 record and strong performances, Amaro announced that Happ would remain in the Phillies' starting rotation despite the team's acquisitions of Lee and Pedro Martínez; rumors regarding Happ's status had been rampant since Martínez' signing and during the trade season when Happ was rumored to be the centerpiece of a potential trade for the Blue Jays' Roy Halladay. New pitcher Lee stifled the Rockies the following day to win the series for the Phillies with a second consecutive strong performance, allowing one run over seven innings and allowing only six hits. In the following series with Florida, however, the Phillies struggled. The Marlins swept all three games of the series, which included Victorino's first career ejection on several close calls by umpire Ed Rapuano, and a crucial error by Victorino's center field replacement, Werth, in the final game of the series. Moyer pitched against the Marlins in that game, a team against which he had prior success in his career (13–3, 2.87 ERA in 100 1/3 innings pitched), and allowed two earned runs on eleven singles through five innings; however, with a rotation-high 5.47 ERA, the Phillies demoted Moyer to the bullpen to allow Martínez to start. Francisco hit his second Phillies home run against the Cubs on August 11; it came in the 12th inning and scored the game-winning run for the Phillies. It became the first win of a three-game series sweep, which Lee closed out with a third straight dominant performance (eight innings pitched, one run allowed, eight strikeouts). The Phillies took two of three games from the Braves in their next series, and completed a three-game homestand against the Diamondbacks with a complete game from Lee, who carried a no-hitter into the sixth inning, and eight innings of three-run baseball from Blanton.

Martínez faced off against his former club on August 23, with the series tied 1–1. Mets starter Óliver Pérez allowed six runs in the first inning and was pulled in the middle of Martínez' first at-bat, down in the count 3–0. Ángel Pagán led off the Mets' first with an inside-the-park home run after the ball became lodged underneath the outfield wall. Martínez pitched six innings, allowing four runs, but the score was 9–6 by the end of the eighth inning. Lidge allowed another run to score and had runners on first and second, thanks in part to a booted base hit and an error by Eric Bruntlett. The Mets had no outs and Jeff Francoeur was at the plate representing the go-ahead run. Francoeur hit a line drive over the second base bag, where Bruntlett caught it, stepped on second base, and tagged Daniel Murphy coming from first, completing the 15th unassisted triple play in baseball's modern era and the second in Phillies history (Mickey Morandini) in a game called "the league's quirkiest of the season". The Phillies closed the series with a 6–2 win behind Lee's eighth straight victory (seven innings pitched, no earned runs). With a win on August 26, the Phillies claimed victory in the year's series over the Pirates; however, the Bucs won two games in a three-night set wherein the game-winning run was scored in the eighth inning or later each night. Andrew McCutchen hit a game-winning two-run home run off of Lidge in the ninth inning of the opener; Howard hit a game-winning three-run shot for the Phillies in the top of the tenth on August 26 after the Pirates tied it in the ninth on a Brandon Moss home run. Garrett Jones set a Pirates rookie record with his 15th home run off of Happ in the eighth inning of the series finale. The Phillies closed the month by taking two of three games from the Braves. For his 11-home-run performance in August, Howard won the NL Player of the Month award.

=== September ===
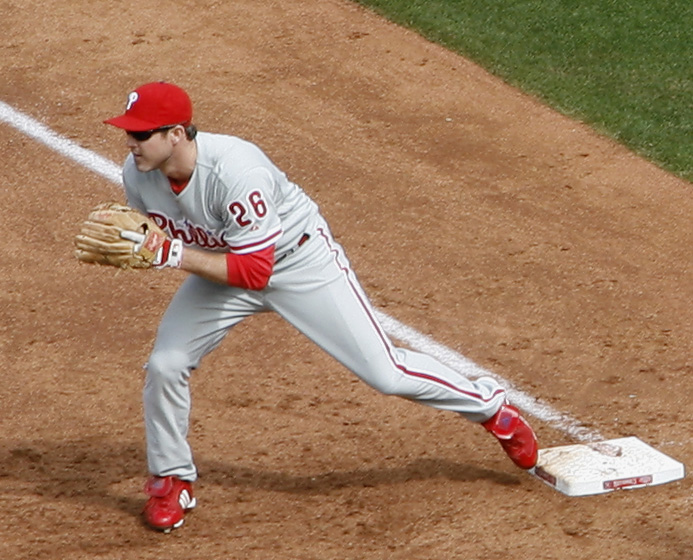
Chase Utley was one of four players on the 2009 Phillies squad to hit 30 home runs.

The Phillies opened the month by taking two of a three-game series against the Giants, besting Jonathan Sánchez, who threw a no-hitter earlier in the 2009 season, and Tim Lincecum, who won the 2008 NL Cy Young Award. This was followed by a trip to Texas for a four-game series against the Houston Astros; the Phillies were unable to muster much offense during the series and were swept. On September 8, in the first game of the series against the Washington Nationals, Ibañez and Utley each hit their 30th home runs of the season, making them members of the 12th quartet of teammates in major league history to each reach 30 in a single season, joining Howard and Werth. The Phillies offense backed Lee to his sixth win the following night, with Madson earning his second consecutive save after assuming the de facto closer's role from Lidge. However, the Phillies could not overcome a pair of three-run home runs by Adam Dunn and Ian Desmond to secure the sweep in the last game of the series, despite Stairs' grand slam; it was their third loss of the season to Washington in fifteen games. The Mets came to Philadelphia for their last series of the season, which began on September 11. The Phillies won game one, 4–2, but the Mets came from behind in the second game of the series, scoring five runs in the final two innings to win 10–9. Making up a postponed game from earlier in the season, the Phillies won the first game of a day-night doubleheader behind Kyle Kendrick's first major league victory in 13 months. Eight shutout innings from Martínez in the nightcap gave the Phillies a 1–0 win, a 3–1 win in the 4-game set, and a 12–6 win in the season series. Martínez' eight innings also began a streak of 26 consecutive scoreless innings by Phillies pitchers: Madson followed with a scoreless ninth for his eighth save of the season; Cliff Lee pitched a complete-game shutout against the Nationals the following night; and Blanton, Park, and Madson combined for eight scoreless innings against Washington on September 16 until Tyler Walker allowed a run in the top of the ninth inning, an RBI single by Willie Harris which scored Justin Maxwell. Hamels closed out the series with a strong performance, perfect through his first five innings and finishing with one run allowed in eight; with their 15th win over the Nationals, the Phillies matched their best season record against the franchise, set against the 1976 Montreal Expos.

The Phillies continued to Atlanta, where they took two of three from the Braves, with Kendrick's second win and Lidge's 30th save in the first game of the series. Martínez was outdueled by Javier Vázquez in the second game of the series, but the Phillies avoided a loss by defeating the Braves, 4–2, on September 20. A doubleheader followed against the Marlins; the Phillies won game one, while the Marlins won game two. In the rubber game, Lidge blew his 11th save after a rain delay to give the Marlins a series victory, keeping the team's number to clinch the division at five. The Phillies and the Brewers split the next series at two games each, with Philadelphia winning the first and last game of the series. The Phillies returned to Citizens Bank Park for their final homestand to close out the season, opening with a fifth consecutive loss to the Astros. However, the Phillies broke the streak with a 7–4 win on September 29, thanks to a Feliz grand slam. The following night, the Phillies clinched their third consecutive division title with a 10–3 win over Houston, guaranteeing a split in the series and a playoff berth, and tying the franchise record for consecutive division titles set by Danny Ozark's teams from 1976 to 1978. After the clinching game, the Phillies rested most of their regular starters, six of whom had started over 150 games during the season; they lost four straight games while the regulars regained their strength, but won the final game of the season in extra innings as Paul Hoover hit a walk-off single in the bottom of the 10th inning. The Phillies finished with a record of 93–69, which was their best record since winning 97 games during the 1993 season.

=== Standings ===
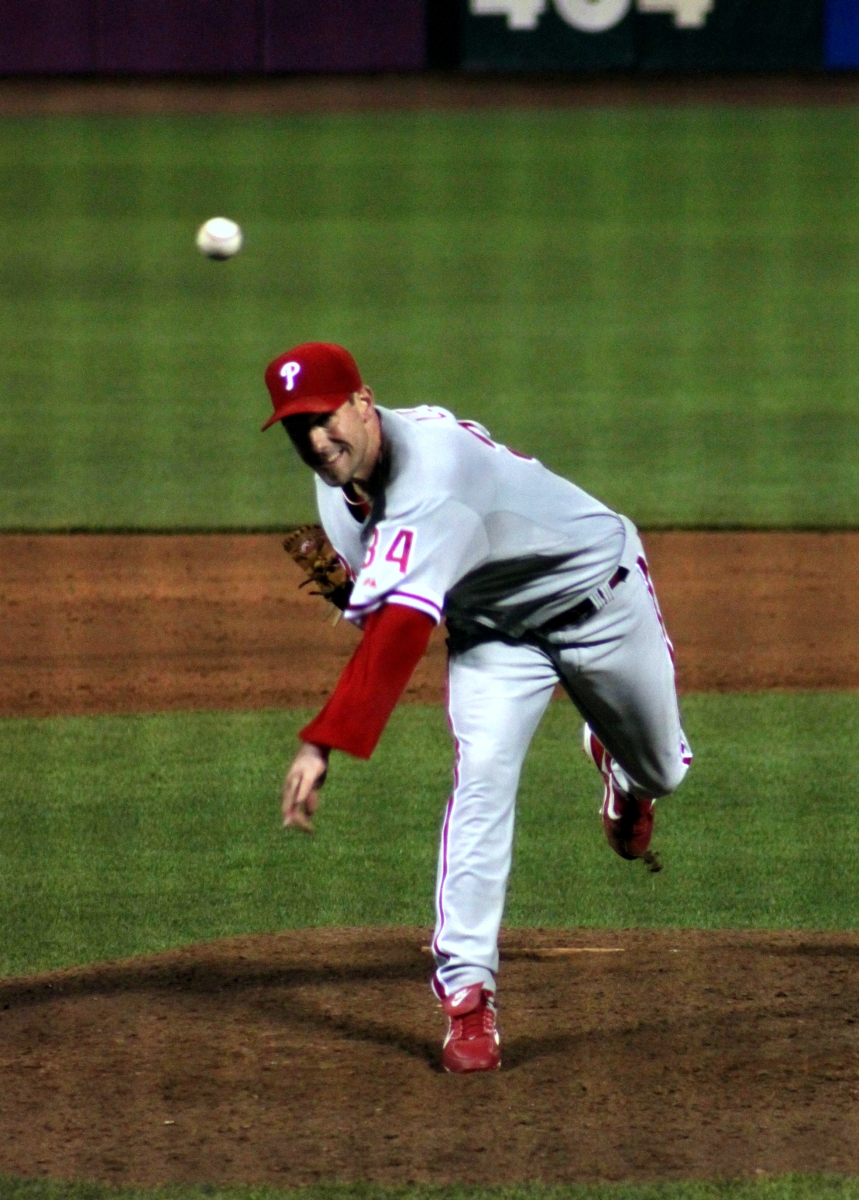
The Phillies acquired Cliff Lee right before the July 31 trading deadline.

NL East
Team	W	L	Pct.	GB	Home	Road
Philadelphia Phillies	93	69	.574	—	45‍–‍36	48‍–‍33
Florida Marlins	87	75	.537	6	43‍–‍38	44‍–‍37
Atlanta Braves	86	76	.531	7	40‍–‍41	46‍–‍35
New York Mets	70	92	.432	23	41‍–‍40	29‍–‍52
Washington Nationals	59	103	.364	34	33‍–‍48	26‍–‍55

=== Record vs. opponents ===
2009 National League record Source: MLB Standings Grid – 2009
Team	AZ	ATL	CHC	CIN	COL	FLA	HOU	LAD	MIL	NYM	PHI	PIT	SD	SF	STL	WAS	AL
Arizona	–	3–4	4-2	1–5	7-11	5–3	5–4	7-11	2–5	5–2	1–5	6–1	11-7	5-13	2–4	1–5	5–10
Atlanta	4–3	–	4–2	3–6	4–4	8-10	3-3	4–3	3–3	13–5	10-8	3–4	3–3	3–4	4–2	10-8	7–8
Chicago	2-4	2–4	–	10-5	2–4	4–3	11–6	3–5	10-7	3-3	1–5	10-4	4–5	4-2	6-10	5–2	6–9
Cincinnati	5-1	6-3	5-10	–	0-7	3-3	12-4	1-5	8-7	2-4	2-5	13-5	1-6	3-3	8-8	3-4	6-9
Colorado	11-7	4-4	4-2	7-0	–	2-4	2-5	4-14	6-0	3-4	2-4	6-3	10-8	8-10	6-1	6-0	11-4
Florida	3-5	10-8	3-4	3-3	4-2	–	4–3	3-3	3-4	11-7	9-9	2-4	4-2	3-4	3-3	12-6	10-8
Houston	4–5	3-3	6-11	4-12	5-2	3-4	–	4–3	5-10	1-5	6-2	10-5	6-1	2-4	6-9	3-3	6-9
Los Angeles	11-7	3-4	5-3	5-1	14-4	3-3	3-4	–	3–3	5-1	4-3	4-3	10-8	11-7	2-5	3-2	9-9
Milwaukee	5-2	3-3	7-10	7-8	0-6	4-3	10-5	3-3	–	3-3	4-3	9-5	2-4	4-5	9-9	5-3	5-10
New York	2-5	5-13	3-3	4-2	4-3	7-11	5-1	1-5	3-3	–	6-12	4-3	2-5	5-3	4-5	10-8	5–10
Philadelphia	5-1	8-10	5-1	5-2	4-2	9-9	2-6	3-4	3-4	12-6	–	4-2	5-2	3-4	4-1	15-3	6-12
Pittsburgh	1-6	4-3	4-10	5-13	3-6	4-2	5-10	3-4	5-9	3-4	2-4	–	3-4	2-4	5-10	5-3	8–7
San Diego	7-11	3-3	5-4	6-1	8-10	2-4	1-6	8-10	4-2	5-2	2-5	4-3	–	10-8	1-6	4-2	5–10
San Francisco	13-5	4–3	2–4	3–3	10-8	4–3	4–2	7-11	5-4	3–5	4–3	4–2	8-10	–	4–3	4–2	9–6
St. Louis	4-2	2-4	10-6	8-8	1-6	3-3	9-6	5-2	9-9	5-4	1-4	10-5	6-1	3-4	–	6–1	9–6
Washington	5-1	8-10	2-5	4-3	0-6	6-12	3-3	2-3	3-5	8-10	3-15	3-5	2-4	2-4	1-6	–	7–11

=== Game log ===
2009 game log
April (11–9)

#	Date	Opponent	Score	Win	Loss	Save	Attendance	Record
1	April 5	Braves	4–1	Lowe (1–0)	**Myers** (0–1)		44,532	0–1
2	April 7	Braves	4–0	Jurrjens (1–0)	**Moyer** (0–1)		44,178	0–2
3	April 8	Braves	12–11	**Condrey** (1–0)	Boyer (0–1)	**Lidge** (1)	44,939	1–2
4	April 10	@ Rockies	10–3	Marquis (1–0)	**Hamels** (0–1)		49,427	1–3
5	April 11	@ Rockies	8–4	**Myers** (1–1)	de la Rosa (0–1)		35,251	2–3
6	April 12	@ Rockies	7–5	**Madson** (1–0)	Street (0–1)	**Lidge** (2)	21,628	3–3
7	April 13	@ Nationals	9–8	**Moyer** (1–1)	Rivera (0–1)	**Lidge** (3)	40,386	4–3
—	April 15	@ Nationals	Game postponed due to rain (May 16)					
8	April 16	@ Nationals	8–2	Martis (1–0)	**Blanton** (0–1)		20,494	4–4
9	April 17	Padres	8–7	Meredith (2–0)	**Madson** (1–1)		44,984	4–5
10	April 18	Padres	8–5	Meredith (3–0)	**Lidge** (0–1)		45,007	4–6
11	April 19	Padres	5–4	**Condrey** (2–0)	Moreno (0–1)		45,266	5–6
—	April 20	Padres	Game postponed due to rain (July 23)					
12	April 21	Brewers	11–4	**Moyer** (2–1)	Parra (0–3)		40,605	6–6
13	April 22	Brewers	3–1	Looper (2–0)	**Blanton** (0–2)		32,759	6–7
14	April 23	Brewers	6–1	Bush (1–0)	**Hamels** (0–2)		36,395	6–8
15	April 24	@ Marlins	7–3	**Condrey** (3–0)	Lindstrom (0–1)		29,032	7–8
16	April 25	@ Marlins	6–4 (10)	**Madson** (2–1)	Kensing (0–1)	**Lidge** (4)	26,412	8–8
17	April 26	@ Marlins	13–2	**Moyer** (3–1)	Taylor (0–1)		17,177	9–8
18	April 27	Nationals	13–11	**Happ** (1–0)	Hanrahan (0–1)	**Madson** (1)	41,620	10–8
19	April 28	Nationals	7–1	**Durbin** (1–0)	Lannan (0–3)		43,930	11–8
20	April 29	Nationals	4–1	Olsen (1–3)	**Myers** (1–2)		36,351	11–9

May (17–11)

#	Date	Opponent	Score	Win	Loss	Save	Attendance	Record
21	May 1	Mets	7–4	Pelfrey (3–0)	**Park** (0–1)		44,773	11–10
22	May 2	Mets	6–5 (10)	**Taschner** (1–0)	Green (0–2)		45,069	12–10
—	May 3	Mets	Game postponed due to rain (September 13)					
23	May 4	@ Cardinals	6–1	**Blanton** (1–2)	Lohse (3–1)		35,990	13–10
24	May 5	@ Cardinals	10–7	**Myers** (2–2)	Wainwright (3–1)		36,754	14–10
25	May 6	@ Mets	1–0	Santana (4–1)	**Eyre** (0–1)	Rodríguez (8)	37,600	14–11
26	May 7	@ Mets	7–5	Pelfrey (4–0)	**Moyer** (3–2)	Rodríguez (9)	37,295	14–12
27	May 8	Braves	10–6	**Hamels** (1–2)	Reyes (0–2)		45,312	15–12
28	May 9	Braves	6–2	Vázquez (3–3)	**Blanton** (1–3)		45,339	15–13
29	May 10	Braves	4–2	Kawakami (2–4)	**Taschner** (1–1)	Soriano (3)	45,343	15–14
30	May 12^{[a]}	Dodgers	5–3	**Park** (1–1)	Kershaw (1–3)	**Lidge** (5)	45,191	16–14
31	May 13	Dodgers	9–2	Wolf (2–1)	**Moyer** (3–3)		45,273	16–15
32	May 14	Dodgers	5–3 (10)	Broxton (4–0)	**Durbin** (1–1)		45,307	16–16
33	May 15	@ Nationals	10–6 (12)	**Happ** (2–0)	Wells (0–1)		23,430	17–16
34	May 16 (DH-1)	@ Nationals	8–5	**Myers** (3–2)	Olsen (1–4)	**Lidge** (6)	19,910	18–16
35	May 16 (DH-2)	@ Nationals	7–5 (6)	**Carpenter** (1–0)	Cabrera (0–5)	**Condrey** (1)	23,896	19–16
36	May 17	@ Nationals	8–6	**Escalona** (1–0)	Tavárez (0–3)	**Lidge** (7)	29,577	20–16
37	May 19	@ Reds	4–3	**Hamels** (2–2)	Cueto (4–2)	**Lidge** (8)	18,449	21–16
38	May 20	@ Reds	5–1	Harang (4–4)	**Moyer** (3–4)		15,661	21–17
39	May 21	@ Reds	12–5	**Blanton** (2–3)	Owings (3–5)		25,901	22–17
40	May 22	@ Yankees	7–3	**Myers** (4–2)	Burnett (2–2)		46,288	23–17
41	May 23	@ Yankees	5–4	Veras (3–1)	**Lidge** (0–2)		46,889	23–18
42	May 24	@ Yankees	4–3 (11)	**Condrey** (4–0)	Tomko (0–1)		46,986	24–18
43	May 25	Marlins	5–3	Volstad (4–3)	**Moyer** (3–5)	Lindstrom (9)	45,186	24–19
44	May 26	Marlins	5–3	**Blanton** (3–3)	Miller (1–2)	**Lidge** (9)	42,249	25–19
45	May 27	Marlins	6–2	Badenhop (3–2)	**Myers** (4–3)		45,256	25–20
46	May 29	Nationals	5–4	**Happ** (3–0)	Detwiler (0–1)	**Lidge** (10)	45,202	26–20
47	May 30	Nationals	9–6	**Hamels** (3–2)	Martis (7–1)	**Lidge** (11)	45,121	27–20
48	May 31^{[b]}	Nationals	4–2	**Moyer** (4–5)	Lannan (2–5)	**Lidge** (12)	45,239	28–20

June (11–15)

#	Date	Opponent	Score	Win	Loss	Save	Attendance	Record
49	June 1	@ Padres	5–3	**Blanton** (4–3)	Correia (1–4)	**Lidge** (13)	22,825	29–20
50	June 2	@ Padres	10–5	**Bastardo** (1–0)	Peavy (5–6)	**Madson** (2)	17,625	30–20
51	June 3	@ Padres	5–1	**Happ** (4–0)	Young (4–4)		15,436	31–20
52	June 4	@ Dodgers	3–0	**Hamels** (4–2)	Kershaw (3–4)		33,839	32–20
53	June 5	@ Dodgers	4–3	Broxton (6–0)	**Lidge** (0–3)		52,538	32–21
54	June 6	@ Dodgers	3–2	Wade (1–3)	**Durbin** (1–2)		41,412	32–22
55	June 7	@ Dodgers	7–2	**Bastardo** (2–0)	Wolf (3–2)		42,288	33–22
56	June 9	@ Mets	6–5	Santana (8–3)	**Condrey** (4–1)	Rodríguez (16)	37,152	33–23
57	June 10	@ Mets	5–4 (11)	**Park** (2–1)	Parnell (2–1)	**Madson** (3)	38,723	34–23
58	June 11	@ Mets	6–3 (10)	**Eyre** (1–1)	Parnell (2–2)	**Madson** (4)	38,532	35–23
59	June 12	Red Sox	5–2 (13)	Saito (2–0)	**Kendrick** (0–1)	Bard (1)	45,321	35–24
60	June 13	Red Sox	11–6	Okajima (3–0)	**Bastardo** (2–1)		45,202	35–25
61	June 14	Red Sox	11–6	**Park** (3–1)	Beckett (7–3)		45,141	36–25
62	June 16	Blue Jays	8–3 (10)	Downs (1–0)	**Condrey** (4–2)		44,958	36–26
63	June 17	Blue Jays	7–1	Richmond (5–3)	**Moyer** (4–6)		42,091	36–27
64	June 18	Blue Jays	8–7	Frasor (5–0)	**Madson** (2–2)	Accardo (1)	44,036	36–28
65	June 19	Orioles	7–2	Hill (3–1)	**Bastardo** (2–2)		45,135	36–29
66	June 20	Orioles	6–5	Hendrickson (2–4)	**Madson** (2–3)	Sherrill (14)	44,939	36–30
67	June 21	Orioles	2–1	Guthrie (5–7)	**Hamels** (4–3)	Sherrill (15)	45,256	36–31
68	June 23	@ Rays	10–1	**Moyer** (5–6)	Price (1–2)		19,608	37–31
69	June 24	@ Rays	7–1	Garza (5–5)	**Blanton** (4–4)		18,862	37–32
70	June 25	@ Rays	10–4	Sonnanstine (6–7)	**Bastardo** (2–3)		20,141	37–33
71	June 26	@ Blue Jays	6–1	R. Romero (5–3)	**Hamels** (4–4)		21,331	37–34
72	June 27	@ Blue Jays	10–0	**Happ** (5–0)	Mills (0–1)		28,801	38–34
73	June 28	@ Blue Jays	5–4	**Moyer** (6–6)	Tallet (5–5)	**Lidge** (14)	36,379	39–34
74	June 30	@ Braves	5–4 (10)	Moylan (2–2)	**Park** (3–2)		31,818	39–35

July (20–7)

#	Date	Opponent	Score	Win	Loss	Save	Attendance	Record
75	July 1	@ Braves	11–1	Jurrjens (6–6)	**Hamels** (4–5)		25,212	39–36
76	July 2	@ Braves	5–2	González (3–0)	**Madson** (2–4)	Soriano (7)	38,254	39–37
77	July 3	Mets	7–2	**López** (1–0)	Hernández (5–4)		45,231	40–37
78	July 4	Mets	4–1	**Moyer** (7–6)	Nieve (3–2)	**Lidge** (15)	45,141	41–37
79	July 5	Mets	2–0	**Blanton** (5–4)	Santana (9–7)	**Lidge** (16)	45,333	42–37
80	July 6^{[b]}	Reds	22–1	**Hamels** (5–5)	Cueto (8–5)		41,548	43–37
81	July 7	Reds	4–3	Weathers (1–1)	**Lidge** (4)	Cordero (21)	43,623	43–38
82	July 8	Reds	3–2	**Madson** (3–4)	Weathers (1–2)		44,179	44–38
83	July 9	Reds	9–6	**Moyer** (8–6)	Owings (6–9)	**Lidge** (17)	45,146	45–38
84	July 10	Pirates	3–2	**Blanton** (6–4)	Duke (8–8)	**Lidge** (18)	45,246	46–38
85	July 11	Pirates	8–7	**Walker** (1–0)	Capps (1–5)		45,209	47–38
86	July 12	Pirates	5–2	**Happ** (6–0)	Vasquez (1–3)		45,245	48–38
All-Star Break: AL defeats NL, 4–3
87	July 16	@ Marlins	4–0	**Moyer** (9–6)	Volstad (6–9)		15,171	49–38
88	July 17	@ Marlins	6–5 (12)	**Condrey** (5–2)	Badenhop (5–4)	**Lidge** (19)	22,891	50–38
—	July 18	@ Marlins	Game postponed due to rain (September 22)					
89	July 19	@ Marlins	5–0	**Happ** (7–0)	Miller (3–5)		15,033	51–38
90	July 20	Cubs	10–1	**López** (2–0)	Lilly (9–7)	**Durbin** (1)	45,268	52–38
91	July 21	Cubs	4–1 (13)	**Condrey** (6–2)	Samardzija (0–1)		45,214	53–38
92	July 22	Cubs	10–5	Zambrano (7–4)	**Moyer** (9–7)	Gregg (19)	45,257	53–39
93	July 23	Padres	9–4	**Hamels** (6–5)	Correia (6–8)		45,242	54–39
94	July 24	Cardinals	8–1	Piñeiro (9–9)	**Happ** (7–1)		45,166	54–40
95	July 25	Cardinals	14–6	**López** (3–0)	Motte (3–4)		45,182	55–40
96	July 26	Cardinals	9–2	**Blanton** (7–4)	Wellemeyer (7–9)		45,271	56–40
97	July 27	@ Diamondbacks	6–2	**Moyer** (10–7)	Garland (5–10)		20,565	57–40
98	July 28	@ Diamondbacks	4–3	**Hamels** (7–5)	Haren (10–6)	**Lidge** (20)	25,044	58–40
99	July 29	@ Diamondbacks	4–0	Petit (1–5)	**Happ** (7–2)		22,952	58–41
100	July 30	@ Giants	7–2	Sánchez (4–9)	**López** (3–1)		36,603	58–42
101	July 31	@ Giants	4–1	**Lee** (1–0)	Sadowski (2–4)		33,934	59–42

August (16–11)

#	Date	Opponent	Score	Win	Loss	Save	Attendance	Record
102	August 1	@ Giants	2–0	Lincecum (12–3)	**Blanton** (7–5)	Wilson (27)	42,964	59–43
103	August 2	@ Giants	7–3	Zito (7–10)	**Hamels** (7–6)		42,744	59–44
104	August 4	Rockies	8–3	Hammel (6–6)	**Moyer** (10–8)		45,203	59–45
105	August 5	Rockies	7–0	**Happ** (8–2)	de la Rosa (9–8)		45,129	60–45
106	August 6	Rockies	3–1	**Lee** (2–0)	Cook (10–4)	**Lidge** (21)	45,316	61–45
107	August 7	Marlins	3–2	Nolasco (8–7)	**Blanton** (7–6)	Núñez (10)	45,114	61–46
108	August 8	Marlins	6–4	Sanches (2–1)	**Hamels** (7–7)	Núñez (11)	45,086	61–47
109	August 9	Marlins	12–3	Johnson (11–2)	**Moyer** (10–9)		45,169	61–48
110	August 11	@ Cubs	4–3 (12)	**Eyre** (2–1)	Gregg (4–4)	**Durbin** (2)	41,477	62–48
111	August 12	@ Cubs	12–5	**Martínez** (1–0)	Samardzija (1–2)		41,133	63–48
112	August 13	@ Cubs	6–1	**Lee** (3–0)	Dempster (6–6)		41,100	64–48
113	August 14	@ Braves	3–2	**Madson** (4–4)	Soriano (1–4)	**Lidge** (22)	37,639	65–48
114	August 15	@ Braves	4–3	Moylan (5–2)	**Lidge** (0–5)		44,043	65–49
115	August 16	@ Braves	4–1	**Happ** (9–2)	Vázquez (10–8)	**Lidge** (23)	25,215	66–49
116	August 18	Diamondbacks	5–1	**Moyer** (11–9)	Garland (6–11)		45,186	67–49
117	August 19	Diamondbacks	8–1	**Lee** (4–0)	Haren (12–8)		45,356	68–49
118	August 20	Diamondbacks	12–3	**Blanton** (8–6)	Davis (7–11)		45,172	69–49
119	August 21	@ Mets	2–4	Pelfrey (9–8)	**Hamels** (7–8)	Rodríguez (27)	38,243	69–50
120	August 22	@ Mets	4–1	**Happ** (10–2)	Misch (0–1)	**Lidge** (24)	38,049	70–50
121	August 23^{[c]}	@ Mets	9–7	**Martínez** (2–0)	Pérez (3–4)	**Lidge** (25)	39,038	71–50
122	August 24	@ Mets	6–2	**Lee** (5–0)	Parnell (3–6)		39,336	72–50
123	August 25	@ Pirates	6–4	Capps (3–7)	**Lidge** (0–6)		17,049	72–51
124	August 26	@ Pirates	4–1 (10)	**Madson** (5–4)	Jackson (2–3)		17,403	73–51
125	August 27	@ Pirates	3–2	Bautista (1–0)	**Happ** (10–3)	Capps (24)	24,470	73–52
126	August 28	Braves	4–2	**Moyer** (12–9)	Hanson (9–3)	**Lidge** (26)	44,747	74–52
127	August 29	Braves	9–1 (8)	Lowe (13–8)	**Lee** (5–1)		45,134	74–53
128	August 30	Braves	3–2	**Blanton** (9–6)	Jurrjens (10–9)	**Lidge** (27)	44,828	75–53

September (17–13)

#	Date	Opponent	Score	Win	Loss	Save	Attendance	Record
129	September 1	Giants	1–0	**Hamels** (8–8)	Sánchez (6–11)		44,679	76–53
130	September 2	Giants	4–0	Penny (1–0)	**Happ** (10–4)		45,086	76–54
131	September 3	Giants	2–1	**Martínez** (3–0)	Lincecum (13–5)	**Lidge** (28)	45,156	77–54
132	September 4	@ Astros	7–0	Rodríguez (13–9)	**Lee** (5–2)		30,043	77–55
133	September 5	@ Astros	5–4	Valverde (3–2)	**Lidge** (0–7)		35,195	77–56
134	September 6	@ Astros	4–3	Norris (4–3)	**Hamels** (8–9)	Valverde (21)	34,754	77–57
135	September 7	@ Astros	4–3	Wright (3–2)	**Park** (3–3)	Valverde (22)	29,040	77–58
136	September 8	@ Nationals	5–3	**Martínez** (4–0)	Lannan (8–11)	**Madson** (5)	17,153	78–58
137	September 9	@ Nationals	6–5	**Lee** (6–2)	Clippard (2–2)	**Madson** (6)	16,818	79–58
138	September 10	@ Nationals	8–7	Hernández (8–10)	**Blanton** (9–7)	Villone (1)	18,706	79–59
139	September 11	Mets	4–2	**Hamels** (9–9)	Figueroa (2–5)	**Madson** (7)	44,377	80–59
140	September 12	Mets	10–9	Feliciano (6–4)	**Madson** (5–5)	Rodríguez (31)	45,243	80–60
141	September 13 (DH-1)	Mets	5–4	**Kendrick** (1–1)	Maine (5–5)	**Lidge** (29)	45,024	81–60
142	September 13 (DH-2)	Mets	1–0	**Martínez** (5–0)	Redding (2–6)	**Madson** (8)	44,901	82–60
143	September 15	Nationals	5–0	**Lee** (7–2)	Mock (3–8)		44,521	83–60
144	September 16	Nationals	6–1	**Blanton** (10–7)	Hernández (8–11)		44,223	84–60
145	September 17	Nationals	4–2	**Hamels** (10–9)	Detwiler (0–6)	**Lidge** (30)	45,210	85–60
146	September 18	@ Braves	9–4	**Kendrick** (2–1)	Hudson (1–1)		27,241	86–60
147	September 19	@ Braves	6–4	Vázquez (14–9)	**Martínez** (5–1)		35,818	86–61
148	September 20	@ Braves	4–2	**Walker** (2–0)	Hanson (10–4)	**Lidge** (31)	29,452	87–61
149	September 22 (DH-1)	@ Marlins	9–3	**Blanton** (11–7)	Johnson (15–5)		—^{[d]}	88–61
150	September 22 (DH-2)	@ Marlins	3–0	Sánchez (3–7)	**Moyer** (12–10)	Núñez (24)	20,039	88–62
151	September 23	@ Marlins	7–6	Meyer (3–1)	**Lidge** (0–8)		31,042	88–63
152	September 24	@ Brewers	9–4	**Happ** (11–4)	Suppan (7–11)		37,678	89–63
153	September 25	@ Brewers	8–4	Parra (11–10)	**Lee** (7–3)	Hoffman (36)	33,428	89–64
154	September 26	@ Brewers	7–5	Hoffman (2–2)	**Walker** (2–1)		40,141	89–65
155	September 27	@ Brewers	6–5	**Blanton** (12–7)	Bush (5–9)	**Madson** (9)	37,197	90–65
156	September 28	Astros	8–2	Bazardo (1–2)	**Hamels** (10–10)		45,146	90–66
157	September 29	Astros	7–4	**Happ** (12–4)	López (0–1)	**Madson** (10)	45,082	91–66
158	September 30	Astros	10–3	**Kendrick** (3–1)	Moehler (8–12)		45,207	92–66

October (1–3)

#	Date	Opponent	Score	Win	Loss	Save	Attendance	Record
159	October 1	Astros	5–3	Paulino (3–11)	**Lee** (7–4)		44,905	92–67
160	October 2	Marlins	7–2	VandenHurk (3–2)	**Blanton** (12–8)		45,135	92–68
161	October 3	Marlins	4–3	Sánchez (4–8)	**Hamels** (10–11)	Núñez (26)	45,141	92–69
162	October 4	Marlins	7–6 (10)	**Durbin** (2–2)	Meyer (3–2)		45,211	93–69

- Phillies win
- Phillies loss
- Postponement
- Bold: Phillies team member

=== Postseason game log ===
2009 postseason game log
NLDS: 3–1

#	Date	Opponent	Score	Win	Loss	Save	Attendance	Record
1	October 7	Rockies	5–1	**Lee** (1–0)	Jiménez (0–1)		46,452	1–0
2	October 8	Rockies	4–5	Cook (1–0)	**Hamels** (0–1)	Street (1)	46,528	1–1
3	October 11	@ Rockies	6–5	**Durbin** (1–0)	Street (0–1)	**Lidge** (1)	50,109	2–1
4	October 12	@ Rockies	5–4	Madson (1–0)	Street (0–2)	**Lidge** (2)	49,940	3–1

NLCS: 4–1

#	Date	Opponent	Score	Win	Loss	Save	Attendance	Record
1	October 15	@ Dodgers	8–6	**Hamels** (1–0)	Kershaw (0–1)	**Lidge** (1)	56,000	1–0
2	October 16	@ Dodgers	1–2	Kuo (1–0)	**Park** (0–1)	Broxton (1)	56,000	1–1
3	October 18	Dodgers	11–0	**Lee** (1–0)	Kuroda (0–1)		45,721	2–1
4	October 19	Dodgers	5–4	**Lidge** (1–0)	Broxton (0–1)		46,157	3–1
5	October 21	Dodgers	10–4	**Durbin** (1–0)	Padilla (0–1)		46,214	4–1

World Series: 2–4

#	Date	Opponent	Score	Win	Loss	Save	Attendance	Record
1	October 28	@ Yankees	6–1	**Lee** (1–0)	Sabathia (0–1)		50,207	1–0
2	October 29	@ Yankees	1–3	Burnett (1–0)	**Martínez** (0–1)	Rivera (1)	50,181	1–1
3	October 31	Yankees	5–8	Pettitte (1–0)	**Hamels** (0–1)		46,061	1–2
4	November 1	Yankees	4–7	Chamberlain (1–0)	**Lidge** (0–1)	Rivera (2)	46,145	1–3
5	November 2	Yankees	8–6	**Lee** (2–0)	Burnett (1–1)	**Madson** (1)	46,178	2–3
6	November 4	@ Yankees	3–7	Pettitte (2–0)	**Martínez** (0–2)		50,315	2–4

=== Roster ===
All players who made an appearance for the Phillies during 2009 are included.

†	Indicates players who started on Opening Day in 2009

2009 Philadelphia Phillies
**Roster**
**Pitchers**: 58 Antonio Bastardo; 56 Joe Blanton; 48 Drew Carpenter; 55 Clay Condrey; 37 Chad Durbin; 53 Sergio Escalona; 47 Scott Eyre; 35 Cole Hamels; 43 J. A. Happ; 38 Kyle Kendrick; 34 Cliff Lee; 54 Brad Lidge; 31 Rodrigo López; 46 Ryan Madson; 45 Pedro Martínez; 50 Jamie Moyer; 39 Brett Myers ^{†}; 61 Chan Ho Park; 21 Steven Register; 16 J. C. Romero; 57 Jack Taschner; 52 Tyler Walker	**Catchers**: 23 Paul Bako; 27 Chris Coste; 24 Paul Hoover; 3 Lou Marson; 51 Carlos Ruiz ^{†}; **Infielders**: 4 Eric Bruntlett; 9 Miguel Cairo; 19 Greg Dobbs; 7 Pedro Feliz ^{†}; 6 Ryan Howard ^{†}; 11 Jimmy Rollins ^{†}; 33 Andy Tracy; 26 Chase Utley ^{†}	**Outfielders**: 10 Ben Francisco; 29 Raúl Ibañez ^{†}; 40 John Mayberry, Jr.; 12 Matt Stairs; 8 Shane Victorino ^{†}; 28 Jayson Werth ^{†}	**Manager**: 41 Charlie Manuel; **Coaches**: 17 Mick Billmeyer (bullpen); 30 Rich Dubee (pitching); 15 Davey Lopes (1B); 22 Pete Mackanin (bench); 2 Sam Perlozzo (3B); 25 Milt Thompson (hitting)

== Postseason ==
=== National League Division Series ===
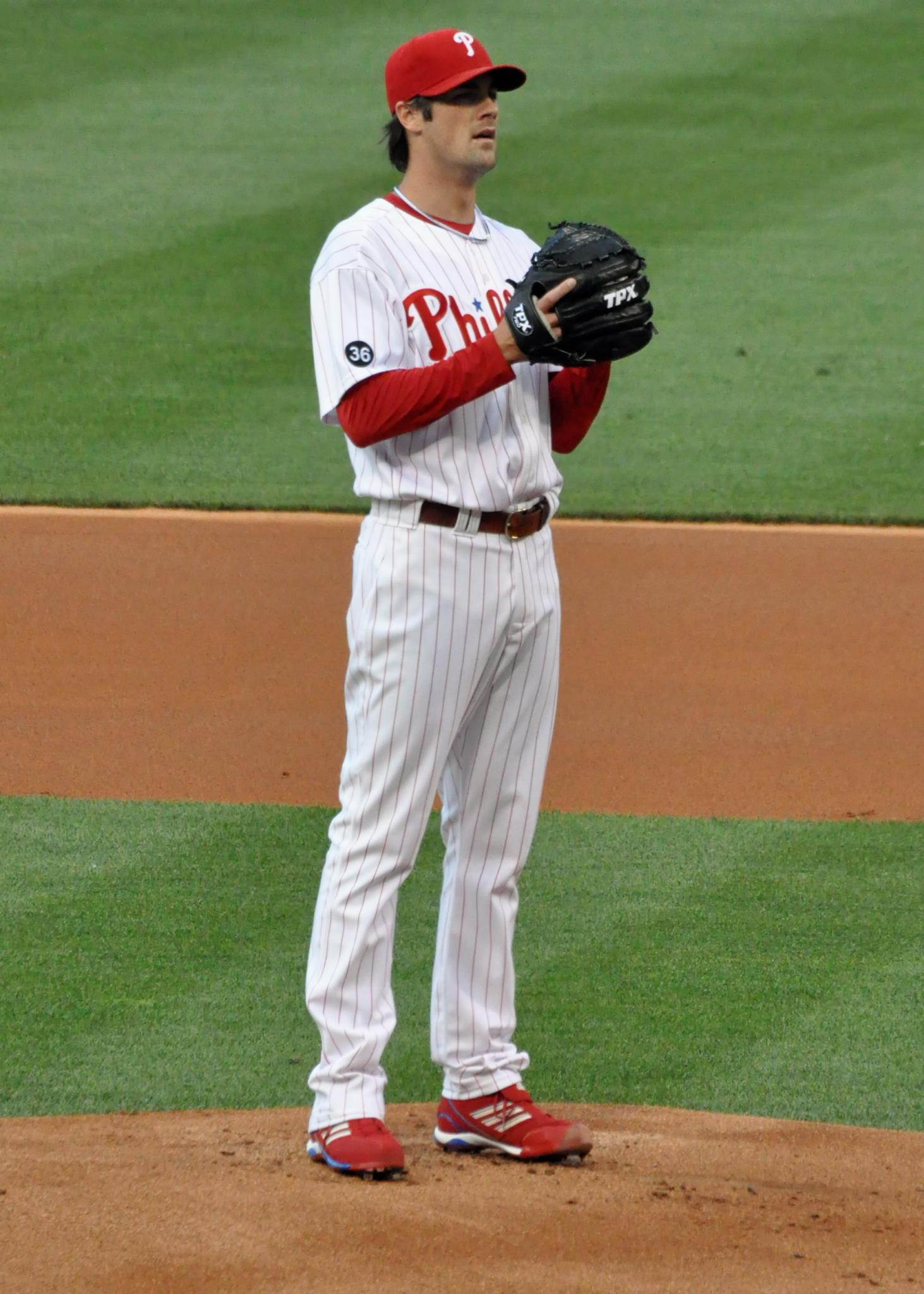
Cole Hamels left Citizens Bank Park during Game 2 of the Division Series to be with his wife, who was in labor.

The Phillies, as the No. 2 seed in the National League, faced off against the wild card Colorado Rockies in the first round of the playoffs. Cliff Lee pitched a complete game in the opener of the series, shutting out the Rockies through 8 2/3 innings before allowing a single run in the ninth. He threw 113 pitches in the game, in addition to getting a hit and a stolen base in his first postseason start. The Rockies evened the series in the second game, as Cole Hamels left the stadium early to be with his wife, who went into labor with their first child. The Phillies staged comebacks twice to bring them within a run of tying the game, but could not close the door as Huston Street saved the game for Aaron Cook.

After Charlie Manuel named Pedro Martínez his Game 3 starter, the game was postponed a day due to the weather forecast of snow and record-low temperatures. The postponement prompted Manuel to change his plans, naming rookie left-hander J. A. Happ the new starter for the game. Happ pitched three innings, allowing three runs, but Manuel brought Joe Blanton out of the bullpen, who pitched 2 2/3 innings and allowed only one run. Brad Lidge, after 11 blown saves during the regular season, preserved the win for the Phillies, a 6–5 victory. In a back-and-forth affair, the Phillies and Rockies traded leads through Game 4 at Coors Field, but the Phillies scored three runs in the top of the ninth to win by one run. Combined with the sweeps in the other three Division Series, 2009 became the first year since the implementation of the wild card in 1995 that all four Championship Series berths were clinched on the road.

Game 1

Team	1	2	3	4	5	6	7	8	9	R	H	E
Colorado	0	0	0	0	0	0	0	0	1	1	6	1
Philadelphia	0	0	0	0	2	3	0	0	x	5	12	1
Starting pitchers: COL: Ubaldo Jiménez (0–0); PHI: Cliff Lee (0–0); WP: Lee (1–0) LP: Jiménez (0–1); Home runs: COL: none PHI: none

Game 2

Team	1	2	3	4	5	6	7	8	9	R	H	E
Colorado	1	0	0	2	1	0	1	0	0	5	9	1
Philadelphia	0	0	0	0	0	3	0	1	0	4	11	0
Starting pitchers: COL: Aaron Cook (0–0); PHI: Cole Hamels (0–0); WP: Cook (1–0) LP: Hamels (0–1) Sv: Huston Street (1); Home runs: COL: Yorvit Torrealba (1); PHI: Jayson Werth (1)

Game 3

Team	1	2	3	4	5	6	7	8	9	R	H	E
Philadelphia	1	0	0	3	0	1	0	0	1	6	8	0
Colorado	2	0	1	1	0	0	1	0	0	5	10	0
Starting pitchers: PHI: J. A. Happ (0–0); COL: Jason Hammel (0–0); WP: Chad Durbin (1–0) LP: Street (0–1) Sv: Brad Lidge (1); Home runs: PHI: Chase Utley (1); COL: Carlos González (1)

Game 4

Team	1	2	3	4	5	6	7	8	9	R	H	E
Philadelphia	1	0	0	0	0	1	0	0	3	5	9	2
Colorado	0	0	0	0	0	1	0	3	0	4	9	0
Starting pitchers: PHI: Lee (1–0); COL: Jiménez (0–1); WP: Ryan Madson (1–0) LP: Street (0–2) Sv: Brad Lidge (2); Home runs: PHI: Shane Victorino (1), Werth (2); COL: none

=== National League Championship Series ===
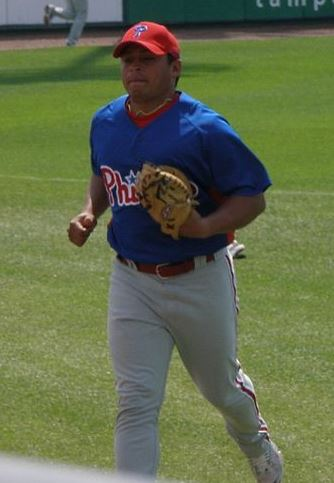
Carlos Ruiz hit a three-run home run in Game 1 of the League Championship Series.

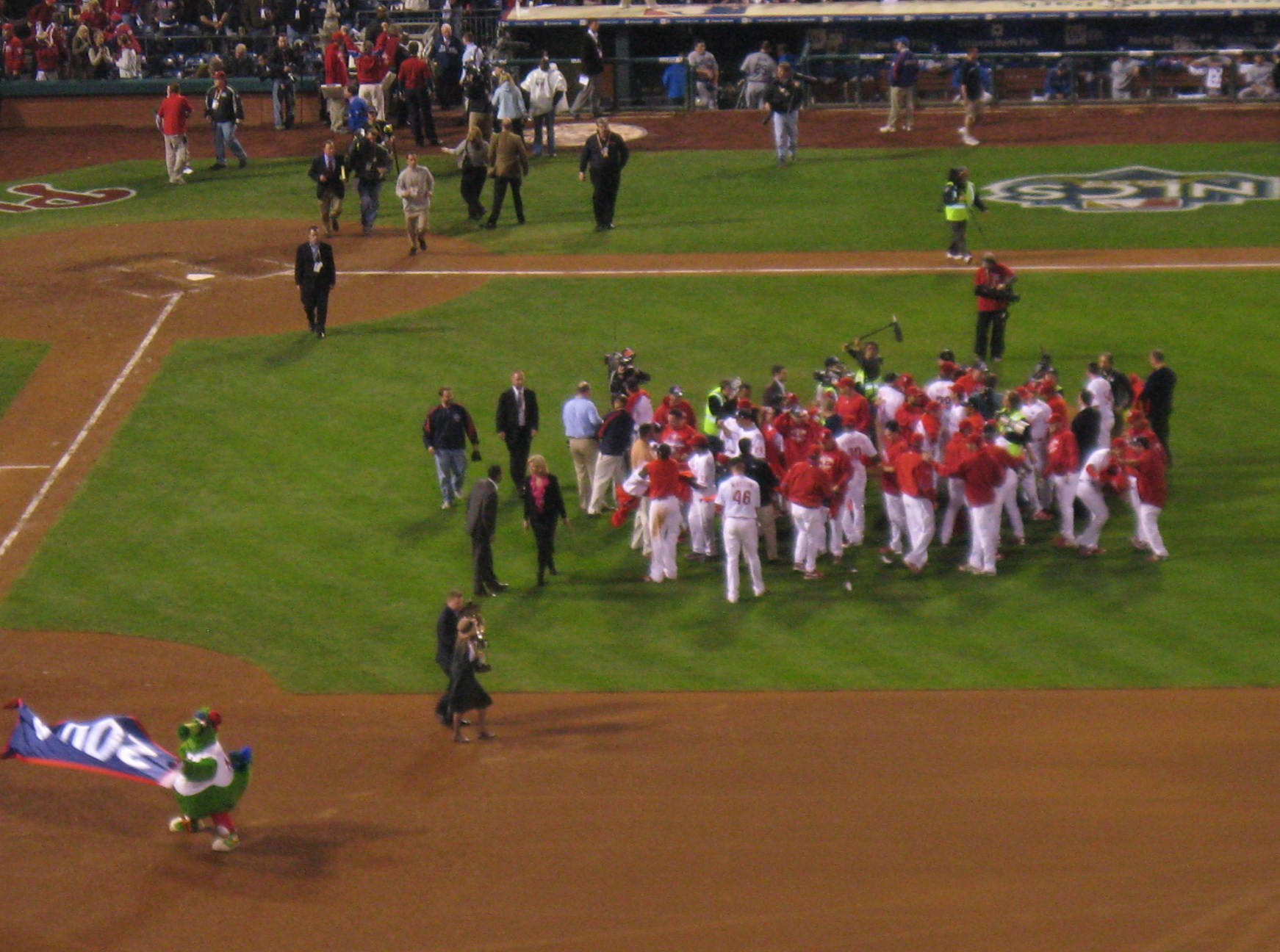
The Phillies celebrate on the field after Game 5 of the NLCS.

The Los Angeles Dodgers were the National League's No. 1 seed by virtue of the best record entering the playoffs; thus, the Phillies traveled to Chavez Ravine for the opener of the playoffs' second round, the fifth postseason meeting between the two clubs. James Loney opened the scoring for the Dodgers with a solo home run in the bottom of the second inning, but the Phillies answered back with a five-run fifth inning, chasing starter Clayton Kershaw. Manny Ramírez' two-run home run in the bottom of the inning made the score 5–4, but Raúl Ibañez followed with a three-run home run in the top of the eighth. Lidge, appearing in his third consecutive postseason game, notched his third consecutive save. Martínez started the second game for the Phillies, throwing 7 scoreless innings on 87 pitches. After his departure, the Phillies used five bullpen pitchers to get three outs in the eighth inning; those pitchers allowed three hits and two walks, allowing two runs to score. Jonathan Broxton saved the second game for the Dodgers, as Los Angeles won, 2–1.

The series moved to Philadelphia for the third game, and the Phillies capitalized on their home crowd immediately, scoring four runs in the first inning of the game. Lee continued his "superb" postseason performance with an eight-inning shutout performance, allowing three singles and a stolen base. Lee and his batterymate Ruiz had higher offensive production in Game 3 (three hits in six at-bats, three runs scored, one run batted in) than the entire Dodger lineup (three hits in twenty-seven at bats, no runs scored). The Phillies won, 11–0. In Game 4, Howard continued to slug, hitting a two-run home run off of former-Phillie Randy Wolf in the first inning; with the run batted in, he tied Lou Gehrig's major league record of eight consecutive postseason games with an RBI. The Dodgers came back to score two runs on a defensive miscue in the fourth inning, adding one run in the fifth on a Matt Kemp home run and one in the sixth on a Casey Blake single. The Phillies got one back in the bottom of the sixth on a Victorino triple and a single by Utley, but were held scoreless until the bottom of the ninth. Los Angeles closer Broxton entered the game in the bottom of the eighth—after George Sherrill allowed two runners to reach base—and coaxed Werth to fly out. Broxton returned to the mound in the bottom of the ninth, inducing a ground ball from Ibáñez before walking Matt Stairs and hitting Ruiz. Greg Dobbs pinch hit for the pitcher's spot, lining out to third base. With two outs and two runners aboard, Jimmy Rollins hit a 99-mile-per-hour (159 km/h) fastball to the right-center field gap, scoring Eric Bruntlett (who had pinch run) and Ruiz. In the fifth game, the Phillies hit four home runs, including two by Jayson Werth, as Hamels allowed three runs in his second start of the series. The Phillies bullpen pitched 4 2/3 innings in the game, allowing only one run as Philadelphia defeated Los Angeles, 10–4. The win clinched the Phillies' first consecutive NL pennants in franchise history, and the first back-to-back World Series appearances by a NL franchise since the Atlanta Braves in 1995 and 1996. Howard was named the MVP of the NLCS.

Game 1

Team	1	2	3	4	5	6	7	8	9	R	H	E
Philadelphia	0	0	0	0	5	0	0	3	0	8	8	1
Los Angeles	0	1	0	0	3	0	0	2	0	6	14	0
Starting pitchers: PHI: Hamels (0–1); LAD: Clayton Kershaw (1–0); WP: Hamels (1–1) LP: Kershaw (1–1) Sv: Brad Lidge (3); Home runs: PHI: Carlos Ruiz (1), Raúl Ibañez (1); LAD: James Loney (1), Manny Ramírez (1)

Game 2

Team	1	2	3	4	5	6	7	8	9	R	H	E
Philadelphia	0	0	0	1	0	0	0	0	0	1	4	1
Los Angeles	0	0	0	0	0	0	0	2	x	2	5	0
Starting pitchers: PHI: Pedro Martínez (0–0); LAD: Vicente Padilla (1–0); WP: Hong-Chih Kuo (1–0) LP: Chan Ho Park (0–1) Sv: Jonathan Broxton (2); Home runs: PHI: Ryan Howard (1); LAD: none

Game 3

Team	1	2	3	4	5	6	7	8	9	R	H	E
Los Angeles	0	0	0	0	0	0	0	0	0	0	3	0
Philadelphia	4	2	0	0	2	0	0	3	x	11	11	0
Starting pitchers: LAD: Hiroki Kuroda (0–0); PHI: Cliff Lee (1–0); WP: Lee (2–0) LP: Kuroda (0–1); Home runs: LAD: none PHI: Werth (3), Victorino (2)

Game 4

Team	1	2	3	4	5	6	7	8	9	R	H	E
Los Angeles	0	0	0	2	1	1	0	0	0	4	8	0
Philadelphia	2	0	0	0	0	1	0	0	2	5	5	1
Starting pitchers: LAD: Randy Wolf (0–0); PHI: Joe Blanton (0–0); WP: Lidge (1–0) LP: Broxton (0–1); Home runs: LAD: Matt Kemp; PHI: Howard (2)

Game 5

Team	1	2	3	4	5	6	7	8	9	R	H	E
Los Angeles	1	1	0	0	1	0	0	1	0	4	8	0
Philadelphia	3	1	0	2	0	2	1	1	x	10	8	0
Starting pitchers: LAD: Padilla (1–0); PHI: Hamels (0–0); WP: Chad Durbin (1–0) LP: Padilla (1–1); Home runs: LAD: Andre Ethier (1), Orlando Hudson (1); PHI: Werth 2× (4, 5), Victorino (3), Pedro Feliz (1)

=== World Series ===
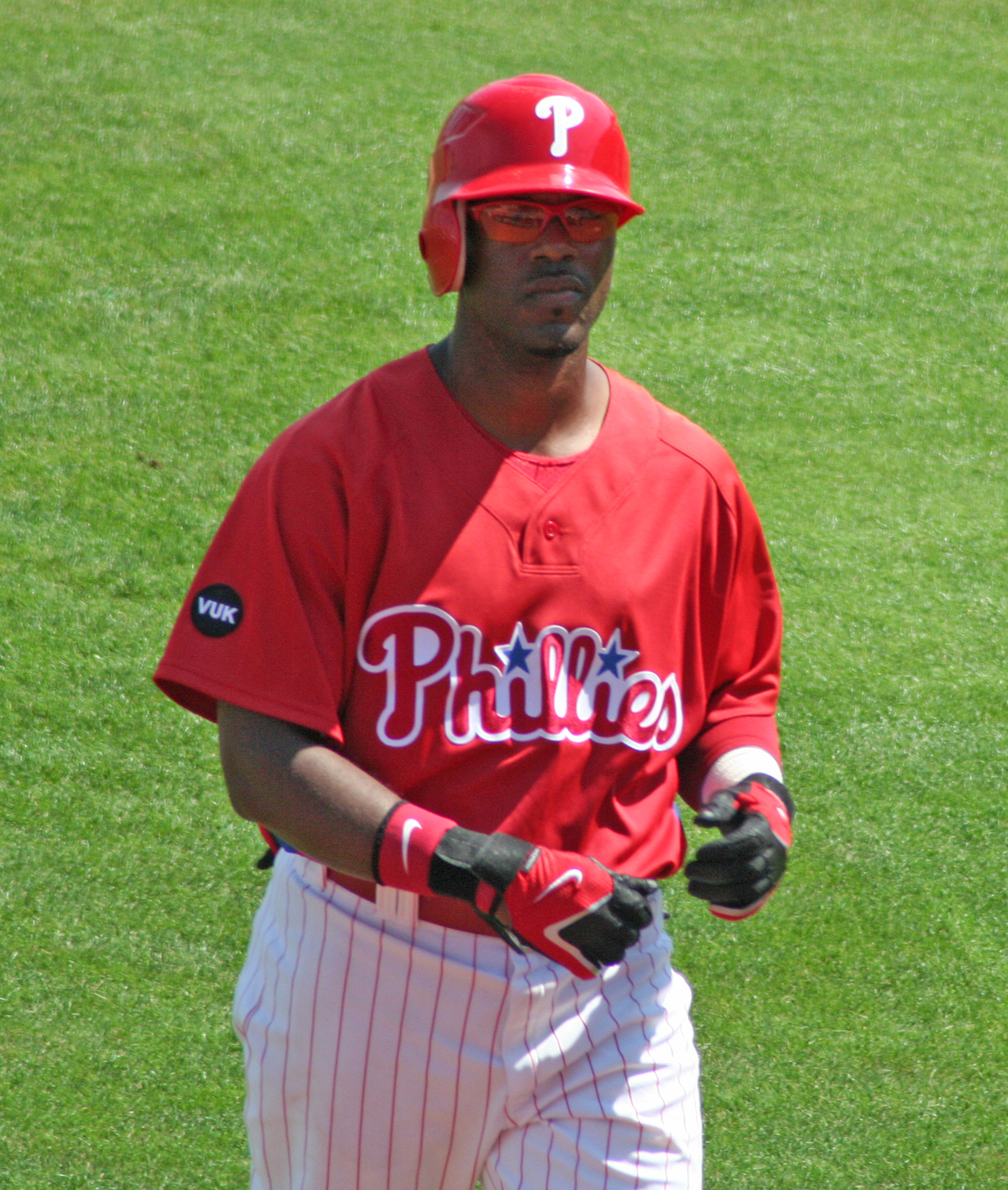
Jimmy Rollins predicted a Phillies–Yankees World Series in May.

The Phillies played the New York Yankees in a three-game series over the Memorial Day weekend during the regular season in May. Rollins said:

How great would that be? A World Series here, us against the Yankees?... We've proved we can put on a pretty good show.

The Yankees defeated the Phillies, four games to two, to win the franchise's record 27th World Series championship. The Yankees had home field advantage for the series, due to an American League victory in the 2009 All-Star Game. In addition to the 27th championship for New York, several records were tied, extended, or broken during the Series, including career postseason wins (Andy Pettitte with 18), World Series saves (Mariano Rivera with 11), home runs in a World Series (Utley, tied with 5), strikeouts by a batter in a World Series (Howard with 13), and RBI in a single World Series game (Hideki Matsui with 6).

==== Game 1 ====
Team	1	2	3	4	5	6	7	8	9	R	H	E
Philadelphia	0	0	1	0	0	1	0	2	2	6	9	1
New York	0	0	0	0	0	0	0	0	1	1	6	0
Starting pitchers: PHI: Cliff Lee (2–0); NYY: CC Sabathia (3–0); WP: Lee (3–0) LP: Sabathia (3–1); Home runs: PHI: Chase Utley 2× (2); NYY: None

The two previous years' American League Cy Young Award winners started the game: CC Sabathia, for the Yankees; and Lee, for the Phillies. Sabathia, who had been 3–0 in the postseason to date, pitched seven innings and allowed two earned runs on four hits; Lee, however, pitched a complete game and allowed no earned runs to go the distance for the second time during the 2009 postseason. The Phillies offense was paced by Utley, who walked in the first inning to set a record of 26 consecutive postseason games reaching base, and hit solo home runs in the third and sixth innings. Philadelphia led 2–0 until the eighth inning, when an Ibáñez single scored Rollins and Victorino, and added two more runs in the top of the ninth inning on a Victorino single and a Howard double. The Phillies allowed an unearned run in the bottom of the ninth when Rollins committed a throwing error, tossing the ball past Howard at first base and into the Yankee dugout.

==== Game 2 ====
Team	1	2	3	4	5	6	7	8	9	R	H	E
Philadelphia	0	1	0	0	0	0	0	0	0	1	6	0
New York	0	0	0	1	0	1	1	0	x	3	8	0
Starting pitchers: PHI: Pedro Martínez (0–0); NYY: A. J. Burnett (0–0); WP: Burnett (1–0) LP: Martínez (0–1) Sv: Mariano Rivera (4); Home runs: PHI: None; NYY: Mark Teixeira (1), Hideki Matsui (1)

The Phillies scored first for the second game in a row in the second inning; Raúl Ibañez hit a ground rule double, and a Matt Stairs single off of A. J. Burnett drove him in. It was the only run allowed by the New York pitching staff. Mark Teixeira tied the game with a solo home run in the fourth inning, and Hideki Matsui broke the tie in the sixth with another, giving the Yankees their first lead. Chan Ho Park allowed an RBI single to Jorge Posada after Martínez put two baserunners on in the top of the seventh. Burnett departed after seven innings, replaced by Mariano Rivera in the eighth. The Phillies put two runners on with a walk to Jimmy Rollins and a single by Shane Victorino with one out in the eighth. However, Chase Utley grounded into an inning-ending double play ending on a close play at first base that drew controversy. Rivera completed the ninth inning for his 38th postseason save.

==== Game 3 ====
Team	1	2	3	4	5	6	7	8	9	R	H	E
New York	0	0	0	2	3	1	1	1	0	8	8	1
Philadelphia	0	3	0	0	0	1	0	0	1	5	6	0
Starting pitchers: NYY: Andy Pettitte (2–0); PHI: Cole Hamels (1–1); WP: Pettitte (3–0) LP: Hamels (1–2); Home runs: NYY: Alex Rodriguez (1), Nick Swisher (1), Matsui (2); PHI: Jayson Werth 2× (2), Carlos Ruiz (1)

After an 80-minute rain delay, the Phillies scored first in the second inning with Jayson Werth's lead-off home run followed by a bases-loaded walk and a sacrifice fly. In the fourth inning, Alex Rodriguez hit a ball down the right field line, which struck a camera at the fence and was ruled a home run after review. Nick Swisher opened the top of the fifth inning with a double and scored on a single to center field by Andy Pettitte. Jeter followed with a single, and both he and Pettite were driven in by a Johnny Damon double. J. A. Happ replaced Hamels and allowed a solo home run to Swisher in the sixth inning. Werth answered with a second home run of the game leading off the bottom of the sixth. Carlos Ruiz homered in the ninth inning for the final run of the game.

==== Game 4 ====
Team	1	2	3	4	5	6	7	8	9	R	H	E
New York	2	0	0	0	2	0	0	0	3	7	9	1
Philadelphia	1	0	0	1	0	0	1	1	0	4	8	1
Starting pitchers: NYY: Sabathia (3–1); PHI: Joe Blanton (0–0); WP: Joba Chamberlain (1–0) LP: Brad Lidge (1–1) Sv: Rivera (5); Home runs: NYY: None; PHI: Utley (3), Pedro Feliz (1)

The Yankees opened the scoring in the first inning with two runs, but the Phillies answered with back-to-back doubles by Shane Victorino and Chase Utley in the bottom of the inning. The Phillies tied the game in the bottom of the fourth as Ryan Howard singled, stole second, and scored on a single by Pedro Feliz. Replays showed that Howard did not touch home plate as he slid across; however, the Yankees did not appeal. Swisher led off the fifth inning with a walk, scoring on a single by Derek Jeter, and Melky Cabrera scored on a single by Damon. Park relieved Blanton in the seventh and held the Yankees scoreless. Chase Utley hit his third home run of the series in the bottom of the seventh with two outs. Dámaso Marte struck out Howard to end the inning. After a game-tying home run by Feliz, Lidge entered the game in the ninth and gave up a two-out single to Damon. With Teixeira batting, Damon stole second and advanced to third as the base was uncovered due to the pull shift against Teixeira. Rodriguez put the Yankees ahead with a double to left field, scoring Damon. Posada added to that lead with a single which scored Teixeira, who had singled, and Rodriguez. Mariano Rivera entered in the bottom of the ninth and notched his second save of the series.

==== Game 5 ====
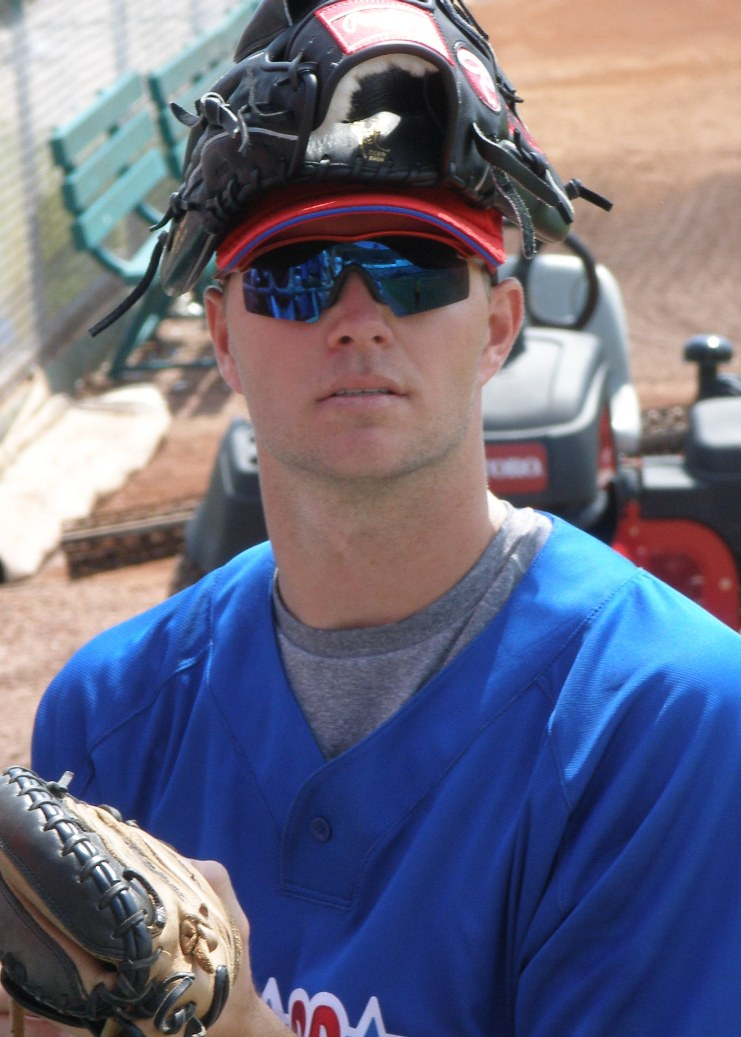
Ryan Madson earned his first career World Series save in Game 5.

Team	1	2	3	4	5	6	7	8	9	R	H	E
New York	1	0	0	0	1	0	0	3	1	6	10	0
Philadelphia	3	0	3	0	0	0	2	0	x	8	9	0
Starting pitchers: NYY: Burnett (1–0); PHI: Lee (3–0); WP: Lee (4–0) LP: Burnett (1–1) Sv: Ryan Madson (1); Home runs: NYY: None; PHI: Utley 2× (5), Raúl Ibañez (1)

The Yankees scored first for the second straight game, but Utley gave the lead back to Philadelphia on a three-run home run. Werth and Ibáñez drove in Utley and Howard in the third inning, which chased the starter, Burnett. David Robertson allowed another run to score on a Carlos Ruiz groundout. Eric Hinske, who entered as a pinch-hitter, scored on a ground out by Johnny Damon. Utley tied Reggie Jackson's record for most home runs in a World Series with a solo home run in the seventh inning, his fifth of the series. Howard struck out for the 12th time in the series, tying Willie Wilson's 1980 record for most strikeouts in a World Series. Ibáñez hit a solo home run to chase pitcher Phil Coke. After being hit in the hand in the first inning, Victorino was replaced defensively in the eighth inning by Ben Francisco. Lee left the game after allowing two runs to score, and Park gave up a sacrifice fly to Robinson Canó to add another earned run to Lee's line. Ryan Madson entered in the ninth to close the game, allowing one run on a double play but earning his first career World Series save.

==== Game 6 ====
Team	1	2	3	4	5	6	7	8	9	R	H	E
Philadelphia	0	0	1	0	0	2	0	0	0	3	6	0
New York	0	2	2	0	3	0	0	0	x	7	8	0
Starting pitchers: PHI: Martínez (0–1); NYY: Petitte (1–0); WP: Petitte (2–0) LP: Martínez (0–2); Home runs: PHI: Ryan Howard (1); NYY: Matsui (3)

The Yankees scored first when Matsui hit a two-run home run with Rodriguez on base after a walk. The Phillies responded with a triple by Ruiz, who scored on a sacrifice fly by Rollins in the top of the third inning. Matsui added to the Yankee lead with a bases-loaded single in the bottom of the inning, scoring Jeter and Damon. Martínez was relieved after four innings by Durbin, who allowed a ground rule double to Jeter, who later scored on a Teixeira single. Durbin hit Rodriguez and was relieved by Happ after recording one out. Happ allowed a two-run double to Matsui, his fifth and sixth RBI of the game which tied a World Series record for most RBI in a single game set by Bobby Richardson in the 1960 World Series.

In the sixth inning, Howard's home run following a walk issued to Utley brought the game to 7–3. After Ibáñez hit a double into right field, Joba Chamberlain relieved Pettitte, allowing no further runs in the inning. In the top of the eighth inning, Dámaso Marte struck out Howard, which set a new World Series record for most strikeouts by a batter in one series (13). After the strikeout, Marte was relieved by Rivera in a non-save situation, who allowed one hit and one walk before closing out the game and the Yankees' 27th championship.

== Awards ==
The 2009 Phillies captured the Warren C. Giles Trophy, as winners of the National League pennant. Baseball America named the Phillies as its Organization of the Year. The Philadelphia Sports Writers Association named the Phillies its "Team of the Year" for the third consecutive year.

Individual awards were won by Rollins, who won a third straight Gold Glove Award at shortstop, Victorino, who won a second Gold Glove in the outfield; Utley, who won his fourth consecutive Silver Slugger Award at second base; Werth, who was named the "This Year in Baseball Awards" Unsung Player of the Year, and Howard, who was named the Most Valuable Player of the NL Championship Series. Happ was named the Players Choice Awards NL Outstanding Rookie by his fellow players and the "This Year in Baseball Awards" Rookie of the Year. He also received the Sporting News NL Rookie of the Year Award and was named to the Baseball America All-Rookie Team (as one of five pitchers) and the Topps All-Star Rookie team (as a left-handed pitcher).

The Philadelphia chapter of the Baseball Writers' Association of America presented its annual franchise awards to Howard ("Mike Schmidt Most Valuable Player Award"), Happ ("Steve Carlton Most Valuable Pitcher Award"), Jamie Moyer ("Dallas Green Special Achievement Award"), and Brad Lidge ("Tug McGraw Good Guy Award").

Rubén Amaro, Jr., was named the "This Year in Baseball Awards" Executive of the Year and the Philadelphia Sports Writers Association Executive of the Year. He was also inducted into the Philadelphia Jewish Sports Hall of Fame.

The Phillie Phanatic was awarded the "Great Friend to Kids" Award by the Please Touch Museum, a children's museum in Philadelphia.

On December 9, Sports Illustrated named Utley as the second baseman on its MLB All-Decade Team. On December 22, Sports Illustrated named Pat Gillick as number 7 on its list of the Top 10 GMs/Executives of the Decade (in all sports).

== Regular season player statistics ==
All statistics are current through the 2009 regular season.

=== Batting ===
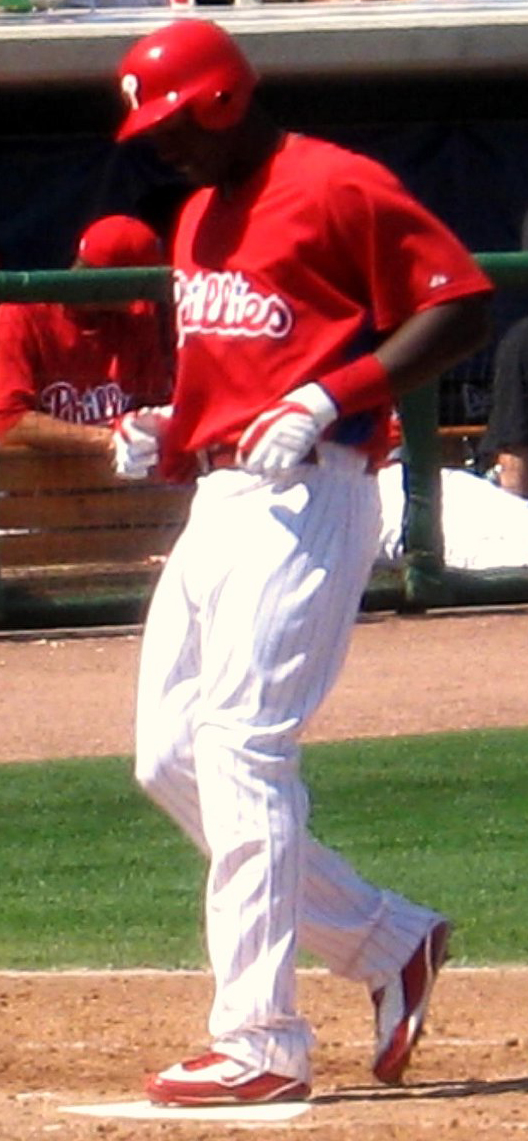
John Mayberry, Jr. made his major league debut with the Phillies in 2009, hitting four home runs in eight games played.

Note: G = Games played; AB = At bats; R = Runs scored; H = Hits; 2B = Doubles; 3B = Triples; HR = Home runs; RBI = Runs batted in; AVG = Batting average; SB = Stolen bases

Player	G	AB	R	H	2B	3B	HR	RBI	AVG	SB
Paul Bako	44	116	12	26	4	0	3	9	.224	0
Antonio Bastardo	5	6	0	0	0	0	0	0	.000	0
Joe Blanton	30	55	4	7	0	0	0	1	.127	0
Eric Bruntlett	72	105	15	18	7	0	0	7	.171	2
Miguel Cairo	27	45	6	12	2	1	1	2	.267	0
Andrew Carpenter	3	3	0	0	0	0	0	0	.000	0
Chris Coste	45	102	12	25	8	0	2	8	.245	0
Greg Dobbs	97	154	15	38	6	0	5	20	.247	1
Chad Durbin	56	7	0	1	0	0	0	0	.143	0
Pedro Feliz	158	580	62	154	30	2	12	82	.266	0
Ben Francisco	37	97	10	27	9	0	5	13	.278	1
Cole Hamels	30	61	6	9	3	0	0	5	.148	1
J. A. Happ	33	43	2	4	1	0	0	1	.093	0
Paul Hoover	3	4	0	3	0	0	0	1	.750	0
Ryan Howard	160	616	105	172	37	4	45	141	.279	8
Raúl Ibañez	134	500	93	136	32	3	34	93	.272	4
Kyle Kendrick	9	8	0	2	0	0	0	0	.250	0
Cliff Lee	12	33	2	7	2	0	0	1	.212	0
Rodrigo López	7	9	0	0	0	0	0	0	.000	0
Lou Marson	7	17	3	4	1	0	0	0	.235	0
Pedro Martínez	9	14	0	1	0	0	0	1	.071	0
John Mayberry Jr.	39	57	8	12	3	0	4	8	.211	0
Jamie Moyer	28	42	2	5	0	0	0	2	.119	0
Brett Myers	17	18	2	4	1	0	0	0	.222	0
Chan Ho Park	42	14	1	2	0	0	1	1	.143	0
Jimmy Rollins	155	672	100	168	43	5	21	77	.250	31
Carlos Ruiz	107	322	32	82	26	1	9	43	.255	3
Matt Stairs	99	103	15	20	4	0	5	17	.194	0
Jack Taschner	23	1	0	0	0	0	0	0	.000	0
Andy Tracy	9	12	1	5	0	1	0	1	.417	0
Chase Utley	156	571	112	161	28	4	31	93	.282	23
Shane Victorino	156	620	102	181	39	13	10	62	.292	25
Jayson Werth	159	571	98	153	26	1	36	99	.268	20
Team totals	162	5578	820	1439	312	35	224	788	.258	119

Note: Pitchers batting stats are included above.

=== Pitching ===
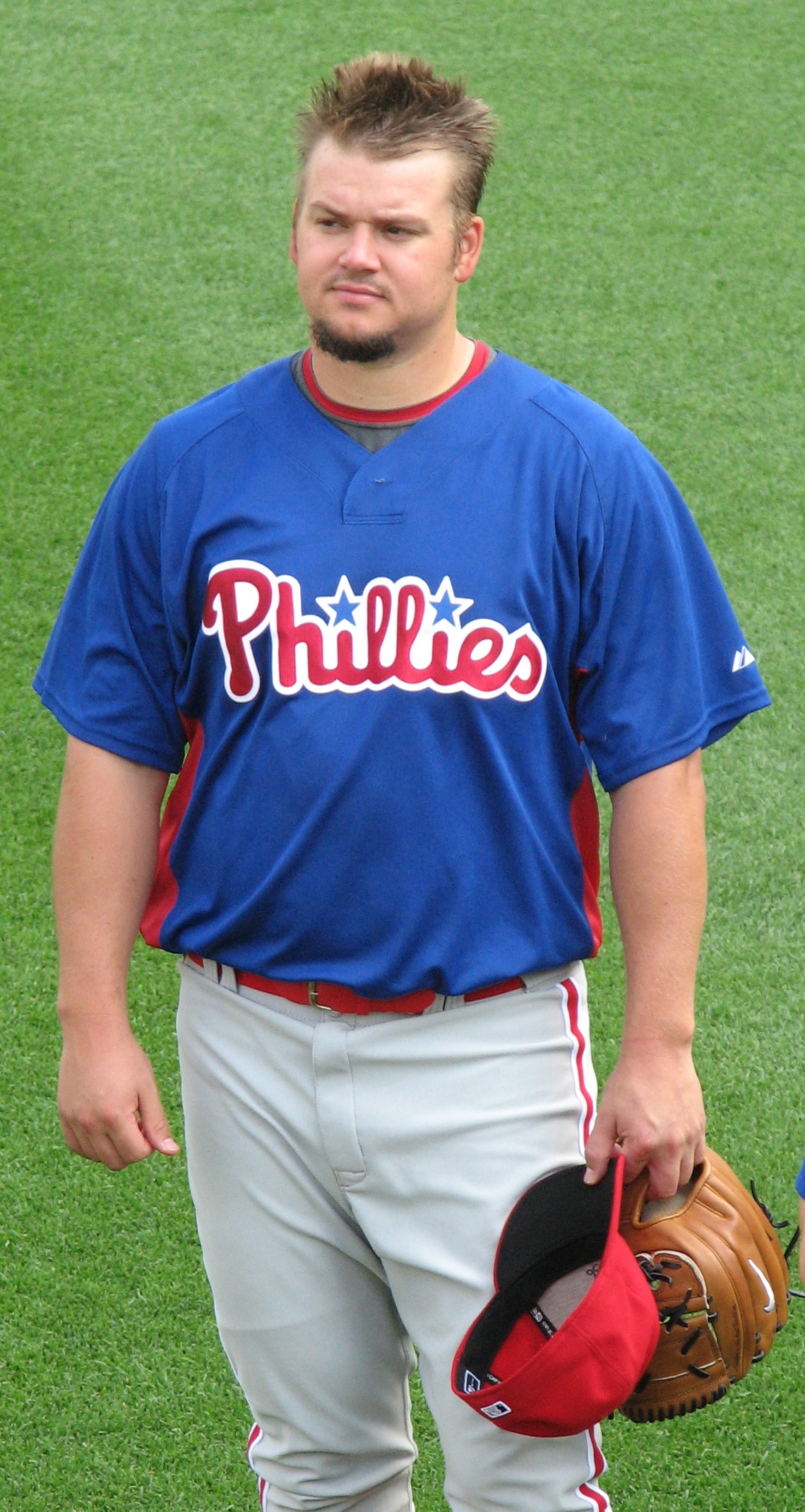
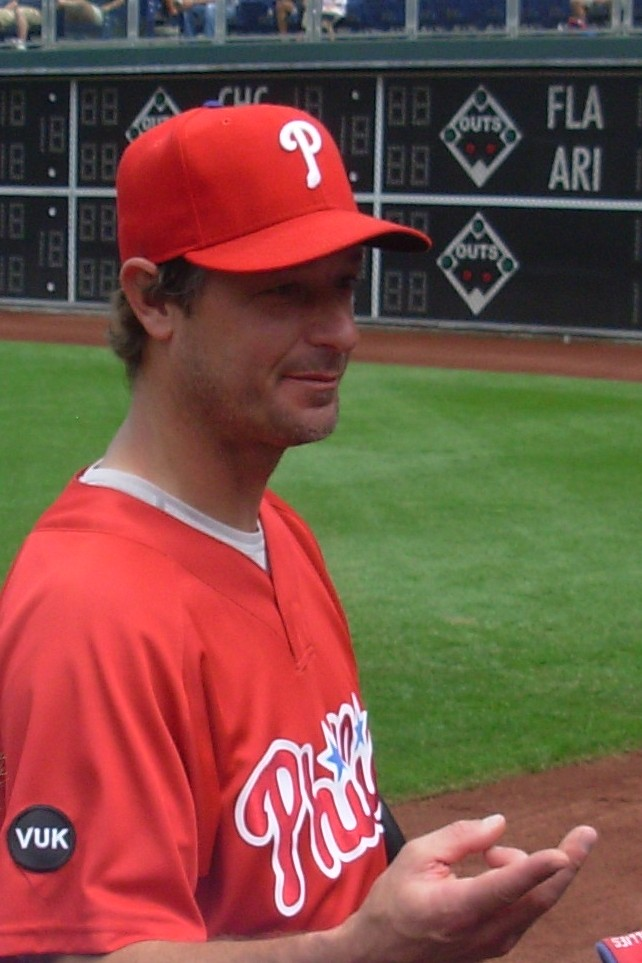
Joe Blanton (top) and Jamie Moyer (bottom) tied J. A. Happ for the team high in wins (12 each).

Note: W = Wins; L = Losses; ERA = Earned run average; G = Games pitched; GS = Games started; SV = Saves; IP = Innings pitched; R = Runs allowed; ER = Earned runs allowed; BB = Walks allowed; K = Strikeouts

Player	W	L	ERA	G	GS	SV	IP	R	ER	BB	K
Antonio Bastardo	2	3	6.46	6	5	0	23 2/3	18	17	9	19
Joe Blanton	12	8	4.05	31	31	0	195 1/3	89	88	59	163
Andrew Carpenter	1	0	11.12	3	1	0	5 2/3	7	7	4	5
Clay Condrey	6	2	3.00	45	0	1	42	17	14	14	25
Chad Durbin	2	2	4.39	59	0	2	69 2/3	38	34	47	62
Sergio Escalona	1	0	4.61	14	0	0	13 2/3	7	7	5	10
Scott Eyre	2	1	1.50	42	0	0	30	6	5	16	22
Cole Hamels	10	11	4.32	32	32	0	193 2/3	95	93	43	168
J. A. Happ	12	4	2.93	35	23	0	166	55	54	56	119
Kyle Kendrick	3	1	3.42	9	2	0	26 1/3	11	10	9	15
Cliff Lee	7	4	3.39	12	12	0	79 2/3	35	30	10	74
Brad Lidge	0	8	7.21	67	0	31	58 2/3	51	47	34	61
Rodrigo López	3	1	5.70	7	5	0	30	24	19	11	19
Ryan Madson	5	5	3.26	79	0	10	77 1/3	29	28	22	78
Pedro Martínez	5	1	3.63	9	9	0	44 2/3	18	18	8	37
Jamie Moyer	12	10	4.94	30	25	0	162	91	89	43	94
Brett Myers	4	3	4.84	18	10	0	70 2/3	38	38	23	50
Chan Ho Park	3	3	4.43	45	7	0	83 1/3	43	41	33	73
Steven Register	0	0	4.50	1	0	0	2	1	1	1	1
J. C. Romero	0	0	2.70	21	0	0	16 2/3	6	5	13	12
Jack Taschner	1	1	4.91	24	0	0	29 1/3	18	16	20	19
Tyler Walker	2	1	3.06	32	0	0	35 1/3	12	12	9	27
Team totals	93	69	4.16	162	162	44	1455 2/3	709	673	489	1153

== Broadcasting ==
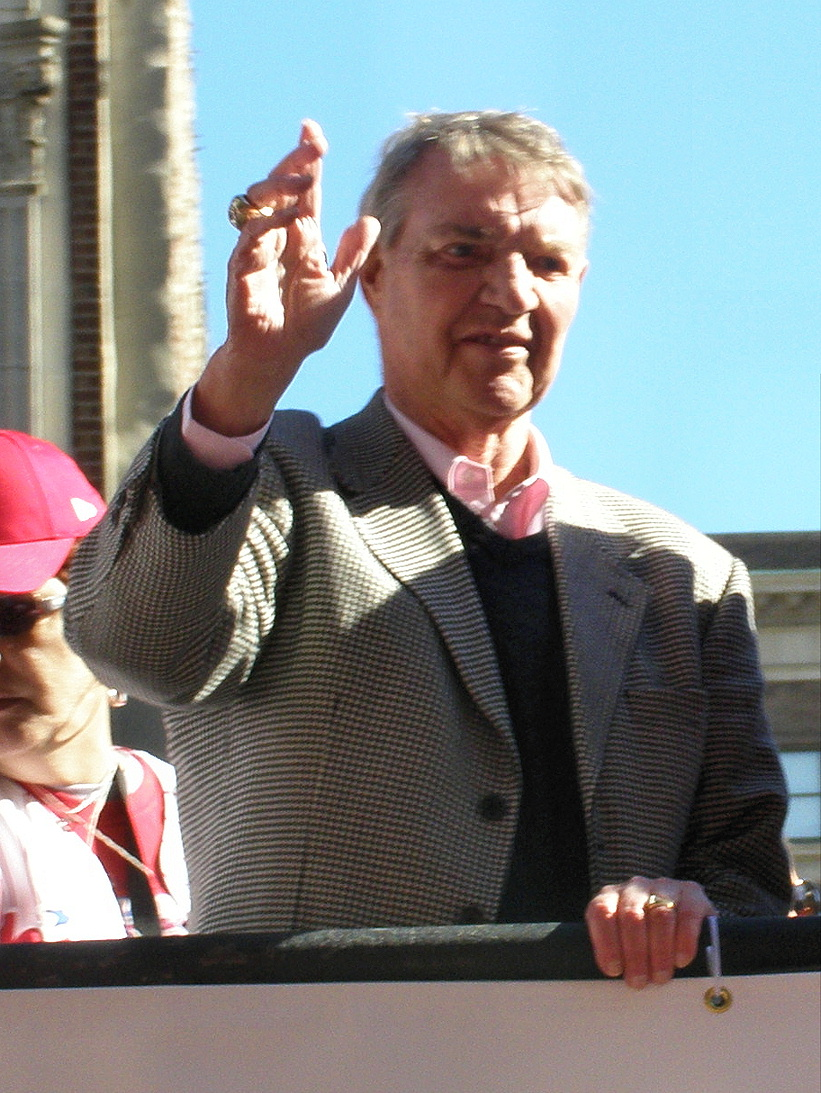
Phillies broadcaster Harry Kalas died during the 2009 season.

Over-the-air television returned to WPHL-TV (My PHL 17) for a three-year period after a ten-year stint at WPSG-TV (CW 57), when the Phillies and the Tribune Broadcasting station signed a three-year contract on November 19, 2008. This marked the third time the station has become the territorial flagship station, the first being from 1971 to 1982 and again from 1993 to 1998.

Tom McCarthy, Chris Wheeler, and Gary Matthews were the members of the television broadcast team. McCarthy took over full-time play-by-play duties from Harry Kalas after his death in mid-April 2009. Wheeler was the color commentator for the first and last three innings of each game, while Matthews did color commentary in the middle three innings. On the radio, Scott Franzke and Larry Andersen were the play-by-play and color commentators, respectively, for English-language broadcasts on WPHT-AM, while Danny Martinez and Bill Kulik provided Spanish-language commentary on WUBA-AM.

The Phillies' postseason radio duties were split between the TV crew and the regular radio crew, while the television broadcasts on TBS were covered by Brian Anderson, Joe Simpson, and David Aldridge for the NLDS, and Chip Caray, Ron Darling, and Buck Martinez for the NLCS. The World Series broadcasters were Joe Buck and Tim McCarver on the Fox telecasts, and Joe Morgan and Jon Miller on ESPN Radio for the national broadcast.

== Farm system ==
Level	Team	League	Manager
AAA	Lehigh Valley IronPigs	International League	Dave Huppert
AA	Reading Phillies	Eastern League	Steve Roadcap
A	Clearwater Threshers	Florida State League	Ernie Whitt
A	Lakewood BlueClaws	South Atlantic League	Dusty Wathan
A-Short Season	Williamsport Crosscutters	New York–Penn League	Chris Truby
Rookie	GCL Phillies	Gulf Coast League	Roly de Armas

League champions: Lakewood BlueClaws

== Footnotes ==
Lead

- ^{A} Statistical leaders must qualify by Major League Baseball's criteria to be considered "leaders".

Game log

- ^{a} Jayson Werth tied a franchise record by stealing four bases, including home plate, in the Phillies' 5–3 victory over the Dodgers.
- ^{b} The Phillies tied a franchise record by scoring ten runs in the first inning, and set season highs in hits (21) and runs scored (22). The 22 runs was the fifth-most in franchise history and was the biggest defeat in the history of the opposing Cincinnati Reds franchise.
- ^{c} Eric Bruntlett turned the 15th unassisted triple play in the modern era of Major League Baseball history. It was the second in Phillies history (Mickey Morandini) and the second game-ending unassisted triple play (Johnny Neun, 1927).
- ^{d} The attendance figure is unavailable (listed as "0") for game one of the doubleheader.
