= Sergio Escalona =

Venezuelan baseball player (born 1984)

- Pitcher
- Born: August 3, 1984 (age 42); El Tocuyo, Lara, Venezuela
- Batted: Left Threw: Left

MLB debut
- May 17, 2009, for the Philadelphia Philles

Last MLB appearance
- September 7, 2011, for the Houston Astros

MLB statistics
- Win–loss record: 3–1
- Earned run average: 3.48
- Strikeouts: 35
- Stats at Baseball Reference

Teams
- Philadelphia Phillies (2009); Houston Astros (2011)

Sergio Luis Escalona Rodríguez (born August 3, 1984) is a Venezuelan professional baseball relief pitcher, who played in Major League Baseball (MLB) for the Philadelphia Phillies (2009) and Houston Astros (2011) and is currently pitching in the Venezuelan Professional Baseball League (VPBL). While still active in MLB, Escalona stood 6 feet 0 inches (1.83 m) tall, weighing 215 pounds (98 kg), according to sources. He throws and bats left-handed.

== Career ==
=== Philadelphia Phillies ===
==== Minor leagues ====
Escalona was signed as an international agent by the Philadelphia Phillies in 2004. He spent around 24 months playing for the Venezuelan Summer League Phillies, where he compiled a 4–5 record between 2005 and 2006. He pitched 107 innings and struck out 105 batters over the two seasons. Escalona was promoted in 2007, playing for the Williamsport Crosscutters, the Lakewood BlueClaws, and the Clearwater Threshers. At Williamsport, he started seven games, posting a 2–2 record and a 7.57 earned run average (ERA). A 1–4 record and 4.15 ERA in Lakewood was not enough to stop him from being promoted again. In Clearwater, he pitched one game, where he allowed one run on eight hits in his only start.

The Phillies sent Escalona back to Lakewood for the 2008 season. He earned a 5–1 record in 28 appearances as a relief pitcher during his first professional season in the bullpen. He notched two saves and compiled a 3.43 ERA. These statistics prompted the Phillies to promote him to the Reading Phillies, where he made 15 appearances. He lost one game there, but had a 2.22 ERA in 15 appearances with 29 strikeouts (90 total between both levels in 2008). Escalona participated in the 2008 Arizona Fall League as a member of the Mesa Solar Sox. Escalona made 14 appearances for Reading in 2009, posting 10 saves in 13 games finished. He struck out 16 batters in 17 1/3 innings with a 2.12 ERA. Due to a need for an additional pitcher in the bullpen, the Phillies purchased Escalona's contract from Reading and promoted him to the Major League club on May 16, 2009.

==== Major leagues ====
Escalona made his major league debut on May 17, 2009, pitching a scoreless inning and striking out one batter against the Washington Nationals. The Phillies went on to defeat their opponents, 8–6; Escalona was the pitcher of record in the game, earning his maiden non-minor league victory in his first game. This was the second consecutive victory by a rookie in a Phillies uniform, as Andrew Carpenter had earned his first victory the night before; the last time that had happened was 2007, when Cole Hamels and Kyle Kendrick won back-to-back games for the Phillies.

=== Houston Astros ===
On January 10, 2011, Escalona was acquired by the Houston Astros, in exchange for minor league second baseman Albert Cartwright after being designated for assignment by the Phillies a few days prior. On May 10, Escalona was called up to replace Nelson Figueroa, who was designated for assignment.

On March 24, 2012, the Astros announced that Escalona would undergo Tommy John surgery due to a torn ulnar collateral ligament in his left elbow, and will be out for the 2012 season. On November 1, Escalona was removed from the 40-man roster and sent outright to the Triple-A Oklahoma City RedHawks.

On August 5, 2013, Escalona was suspended for 50 games by Major League Baseball for using performance-enhancing drugs from Biogenesis. On November 4, Escalona elected free agency.

== See also ==
- List of Major League Baseball players from Venezuela
