= 2008 Philadelphia Phillies season =

Major League Baseball season

2008 Philadelphia Phillies
- World Series champions National League champions National League East champions
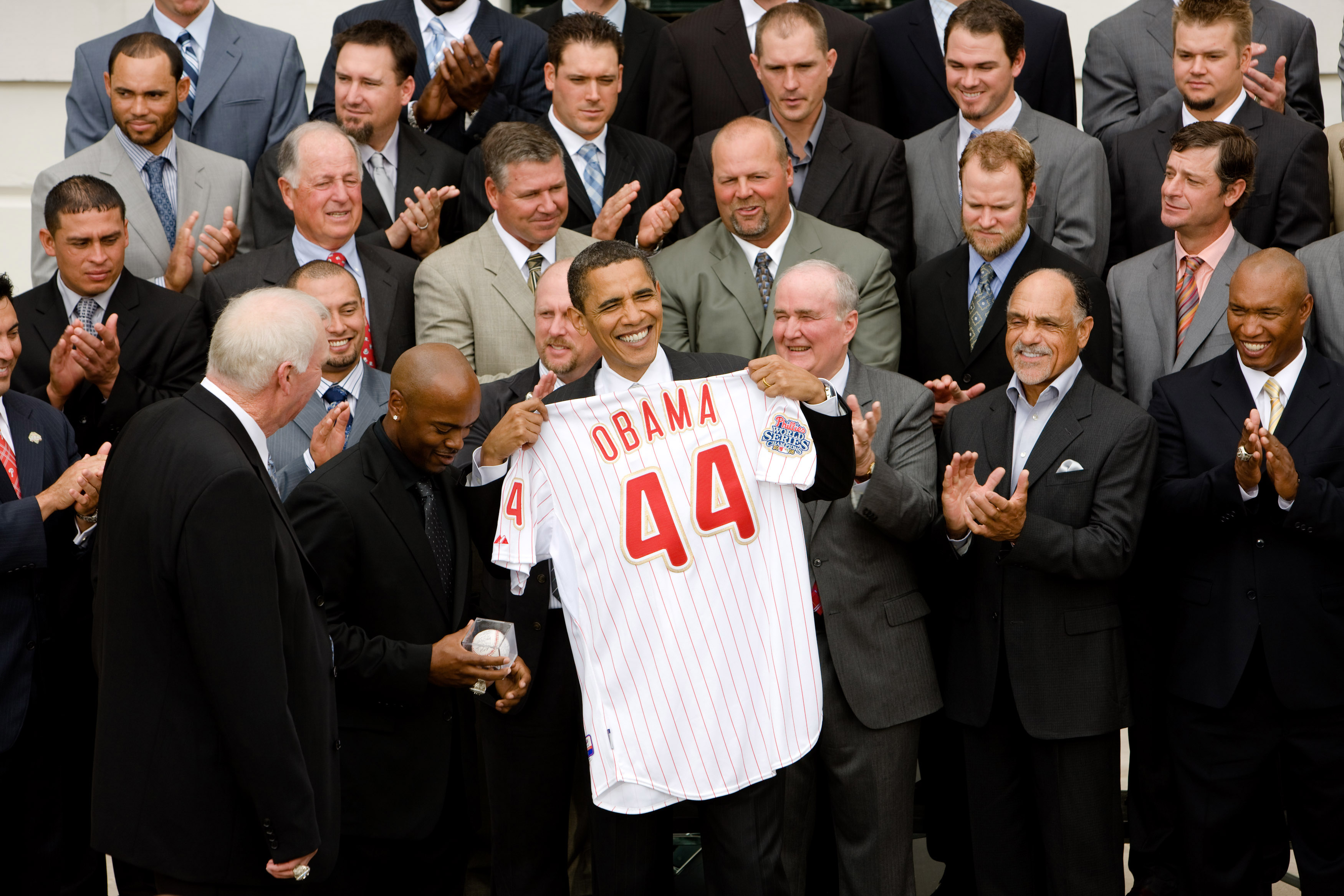
- The world champion Philadelphia Phillies honored at the White House after their 2008 World Series victory
- League: National League
- Division: East
- Ballpark: Citizens Bank Park
- City: Philadelphia
- Record: 92–70 (.568)
- Divisional place: 1st
- Owners: Bill Giles
- General managers: Pat Gillick
- Managers: Charlie Manuel
- Television: Comcast SportsNet; CN8; WPSG-TV (CW 57); KYW-TV (CBS 3); Harry Kalas, Tom McCarthy, Chris Wheeler, Gary Matthews
- Radio: WPHT 1210 AM; Harry Kalas, Chris Wheeler, Larry Andersen, Scott Franzke, Tom McCarthy; WUBA 1480 AM (Spanish)

The Philadelphia Phillies' 2008 season was the 126th in the history of the franchise. The team finished with a regular season record of 92–70, first in the National League East. In the postseason, the Phillies won the World Series; this was the first major sports championship for Philadelphia since the 76ers swept the 1983 NBA Finals. During the season, they were managed by Charlie Manuel. To date, this is the most recent season the Phillies won the World Series.

The Phillies opened the season by posting their first winning April since 2003. They also scored 60 runs over 5 games in late May in a sweep over the Colorado Rockies and accrued a 14–4 record over 18 games entering the month of June. The Phillies' performance declined in late June, but they improved after the All-Star break, going 9–6 immediately following the midseason hiatus. Closer Brad Lidge earned eight saves in those games, and did not blow a save throughout the season and the postseason. Philadelphia traded sweeps with the Los Angeles Dodgers in August and went 13–3 in their last 16 games, taking advantage of a late swoon by the New York Mets for the second year in a row to capture the division crown. The team won its position in the playoffs after its second consecutive East Division title. The Phillies also posted the best road record in the National League, at 44–37.

Philadelphia defeated the Milwaukee Brewers in the NLDS, 3–1, and the Dodgers in the NLCS, 4–1, to win the National League pennant and advance to the World Series. In the World Series, the Phillies defeated the Tampa Bay Rays, 4–1, to win their first championship in 28 years, ending the Curse of Billy Penn. Phillies starting pitcher Cole Hamels was named the Most Valuable Player of the NLCS and the World Series.

Statistical leaders in batting for the 2008 team included center fielder Shane Victorino (batting average, .293), first baseman Ryan Howard (home runs, 48; runs batted in, 146), and second baseman Chase Utley (runs scored, 113). For their accomplishments, Howard won the Josh Gibson Award for the National League, and Utley won his third consecutive Silver Slugger Award. Pitching leaders included left-handed starting pitcher Hamels (innings pitched, 227 1/3), left-hander starter Jamie Moyer (wins, 16), and right-handed relief pitcher Lidge (saves, 41). Lidge won the DHL Delivery Man of the Year and the Major League Baseball Comeback Player of the Year awards for his performance during the season. Victorino and shortstop Jimmy Rollins also won Gold Glove awards for their play in the field.

== Offseason ==
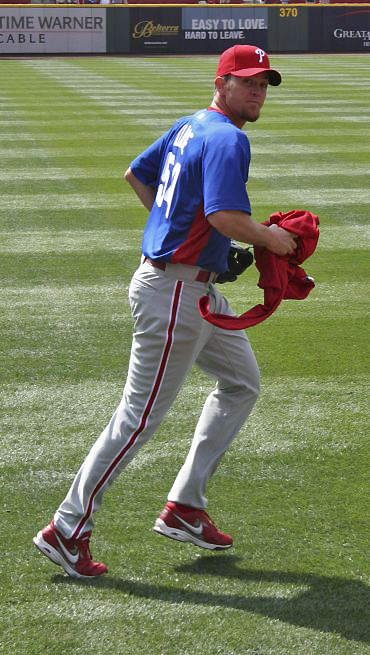
In the offseason, the Phillies acquired Brad Lidge from Houston.

=== Players and coaches ===
On October 29, 2007, Charlie Manuel signed an extension to manage the Phillies for two more years. All of the coaches from the 2007 division championship season were also retained. However, Davey Lopes underwent treatment for cancer and had to be replaced on an interim basis in the early part of the season. The Phillies re-signed left-handed relief pitcher J. C. Romero to a new two-year contract after a dominating 2007, in which he struck out 42 batters in 56 1/3 innings pitched while posting a 1.92 earned run average. Outfielder Michael Bourn and right-handed pitcher Geoff Geary were traded to Houston for closer Brad Lidge and infielder Eric Bruntlett on November 7, 2007. Outfielder Chris Roberson was traded to Baltimore for cash in January 2008, while third baseman Pedro Feliz, outfielder Geoff Jenkins, and outfielder So Taguchi arrived as free agents; Feliz was signed on January 31, while Jenkins and Taguchi signed the month before. In the broadcast booth, Tom McCarthy also returned to the team after two years as a radio announcer for the New York Mets.

=== Uniforms ===
On November 29, 2007, the team announced that in honor of the franchise's 125th anniversary of playing in Philadelphia, the Phillies would wear an alternate home uniform based on their 1948 uniforms for all day home games during the season. The cap formerly used for interleague play, a red-crowned cap with a blue bill and a star within the "P" logo, was retired.

=== Controversy with the Mets ===
On February 16, 2008, Mets center fielder Carlos Beltrán made a statement regarding the upcoming season. He stated that "[without] Santana, we felt, as a team, that we had a chance to win in our division. With him now, I have no doubt that we're going to win in our division. I have no doubt in that. We've got what it takes. To Jimmy Rollins: We are the team to beat." Beltran's statement echoed Rollins' 2007 assertion that the Phillies were "the team to beat in the NL East—finally". Inasmuch as Beltran had imitated Rollins' 2007 preseason prediction, Rollins arrived in camp for Spring training and responded:

"There isn't a team in the National League that's better than us. The pressure's back on them if you ask me. They were on paper the best team in the division last year and they were supposed to win, and they didn't. One, there are four other teams in our division who are going to make sure that doesn't happen, and two, has anyone ever heard of plagiarism? That was pretty good, especially coming from him. He's a quiet guy, so it was probably shocking when he said it. Not shocking in a bad way, like 'Wow, I can't believe he said that.' More like, 'Wow, he finally said something because he's a leader on that team and you definitely need to be a vocal leader.'"

== Regular season ==
=== Monthly summaries ===
==== March/April ====
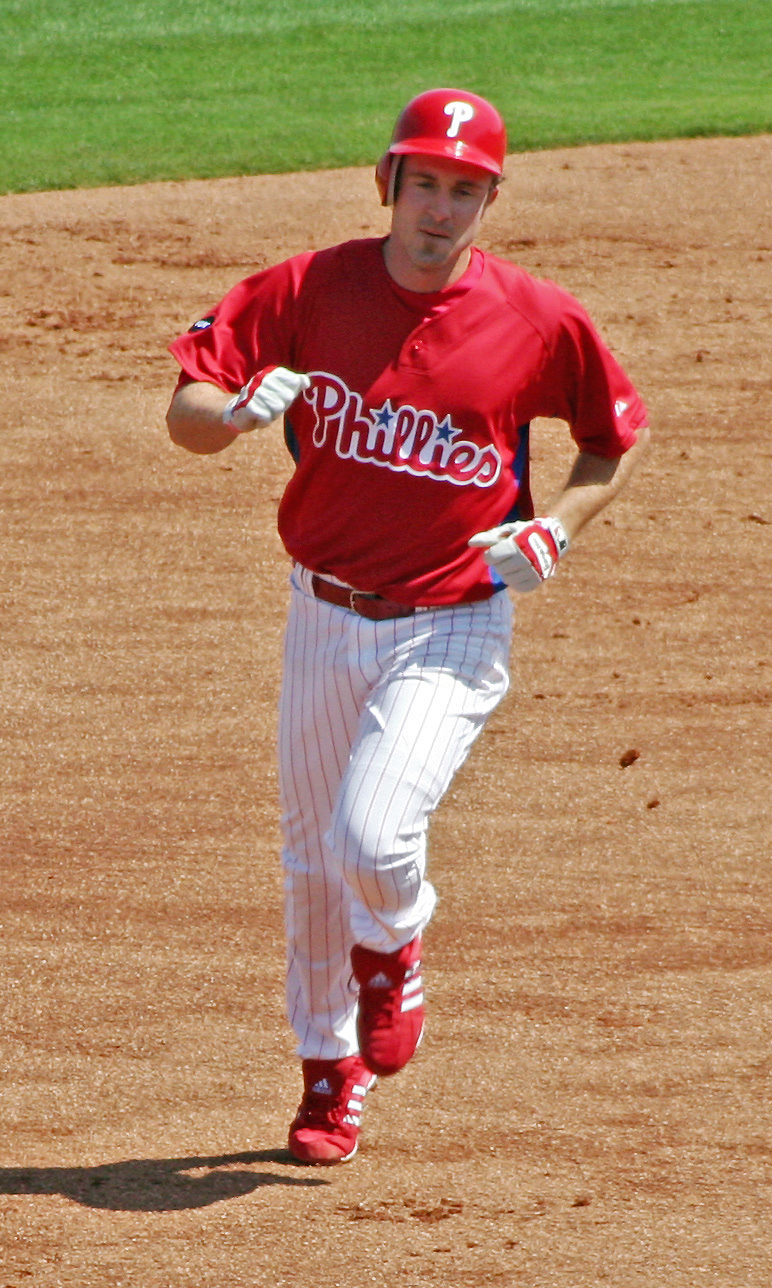
Chase Utley led Major League Baseball with 11 home runs in April.

The Phillies opened the season against the Washington Nationals at home on March 31. They failed to win any of their first three series, losing two of three against the Nationals and New York Mets, with a four-game split against the Cincinnati Reds between those series. The Phillies won their next two series against the Chicago Cubs and the Houston Astros. After dropping a second series to the Mets, the Phillies finished the month with 15 wins and 12 losses. They did not achieve a three-game sweep against any team in the opening month, nor were they swept. By winning at least one game in each series, the Phillies were able to achieve their first winning April in several seasons.

With a batting average of .360 and his Major League Baseball-leading 11 home runs, Chase Utley paced the team's offense, followed closely by a resurgent Pat Burrell and his 25 runs batted in. Though team speed was hampered by the loss of Shane Victorino and Jimmy Rollins to the disabled list, the latter for the first time in his career, the Phillies still pushed forward to a 15–13 record, including their Opening Day loss to Washington. The pitching rotation was led by ace Cole Hamels, who led the team in wins (3), earned run average (ERA) (2.70), and innings pitched (43 1/3). Reliever J. C. Romero and new closer Brad Lidge both went the entire month without sacrificing a single run, over 12 1/3 and 11 innings respectively.

==== May ====
The Phillies did not achieve their first three-game series sweep until almost the end of May, taking two from the San Francisco Giants, the Arizona Diamondbacks (splitting the series 2–2), the Atlanta Braves, and the Nationals, and dropping two to the Giants, the Toronto Blue Jays, and the Astros. However, the Phillies' first sweep was achieved in dramatic fashion, as the offense broke out for 60 runs in five games, including a 20–5 win over the Colorado Rockies.

Though several fill-in players, including Brad Harman and T. J. Bohn, substituted during Victorino's and Rollins' absence, none was more valuable to the team during May than Jayson Werth. Expected to be primarily a platoon player coming into the season, Werth showed positive form. While Utley slowed down, Werth had a game with three home runs and stole four bases in the month. However, as Rollins and Victorino returned, Werth was lost to the disabled list. Ryan Howard broke out of his early-season slump, batting .245 in May, nearly an 80-point increase from his average in April, and hitting ten home runs. Hometown pitcher Jamie Moyer also became the sixth pitcher in Major League Baseball history to defeat all 30 teams in the league on May 26 in a 20–5 Phillies win over Colorado.

==== June ====
June was a tale of two halves for the Phillies, as they started June with a strong combination of offense and pitching. From May 26 to June 13, the team posted a 14–4 record, starting their run with a 15–6 win over the Astros and ended with a 20–2 win over the Cardinals, as their record reached a first-half high of 13 games over .500 at 41–28. However, the offense took a downturn as the Phillies pitchers began to sacrifice more runs in the latter part of the month. The Phillies went 3–11 over the remainder of June, as the pitchers allowed an average of 4.79 runs per game, compared to the offense's 3.36 runs scored per game. This was punctuated by a season-high six-game losing streak. The poor records coincided with the Phillies' stretch of interleague play for 2008, as they were swept by the Angels, and lost their series with the Red Sox, A's, and Rangers, in addition to dropping two NL series against the Cardinals and Marlins. While Hamels and Kyle Kendrick each managed to post a 3–1 record in the rotation, the other starters (Moyer, Adam Eaton, and Brett Myers) were not so lucky. Myers' poor performance received arguably the most scrutiny, based on management's decision to move him back to the rotation from the bullpen after the 2007 season. Myers would eventually accept an option to Triple-A to work on his mechanical issues and confidence.

==== July ====
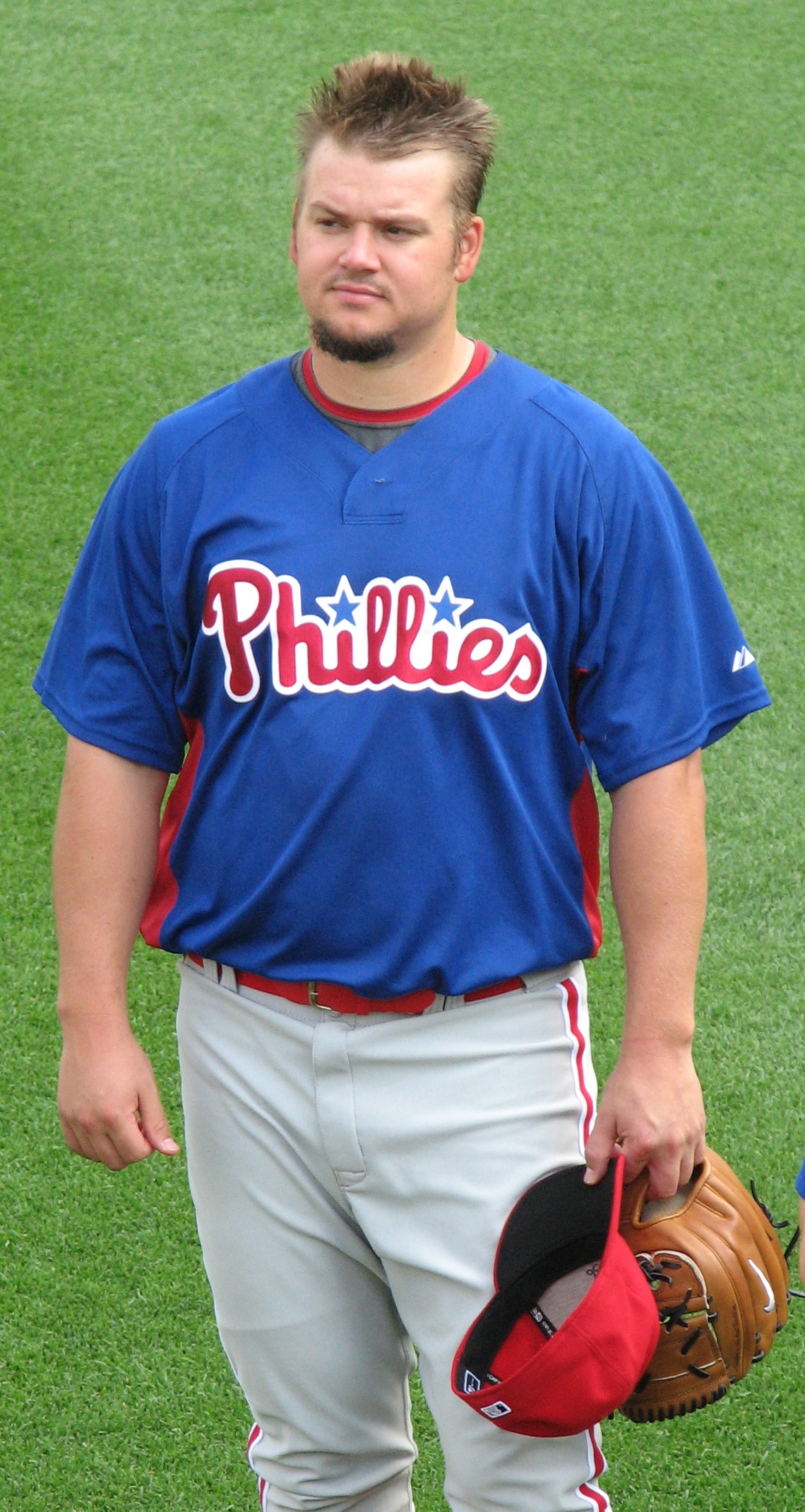
The Phillies acquired Joe Blanton to improve their rotation for a shot at the pennant.

July began with the announcement that Chase Utley and Brad Lidge would represent the team at the 2008 Major League Baseball All-Star Game; Utley garnered the most votes of all National League players. Pat Burrell was also selected as a "Final Vote" candidate, but lost out on the opportunity for his first All-Star appearance to Milwaukee outfielder Corey Hart. The Phillies went 8–5 in July before the All-Star break, compiling a four-game win streak, a four-game losing streak, and winning four of their last five. The team posted a sweep of the Braves, a series loss to the Mets, and series wins over the Cardinals and the Diamondbacks.

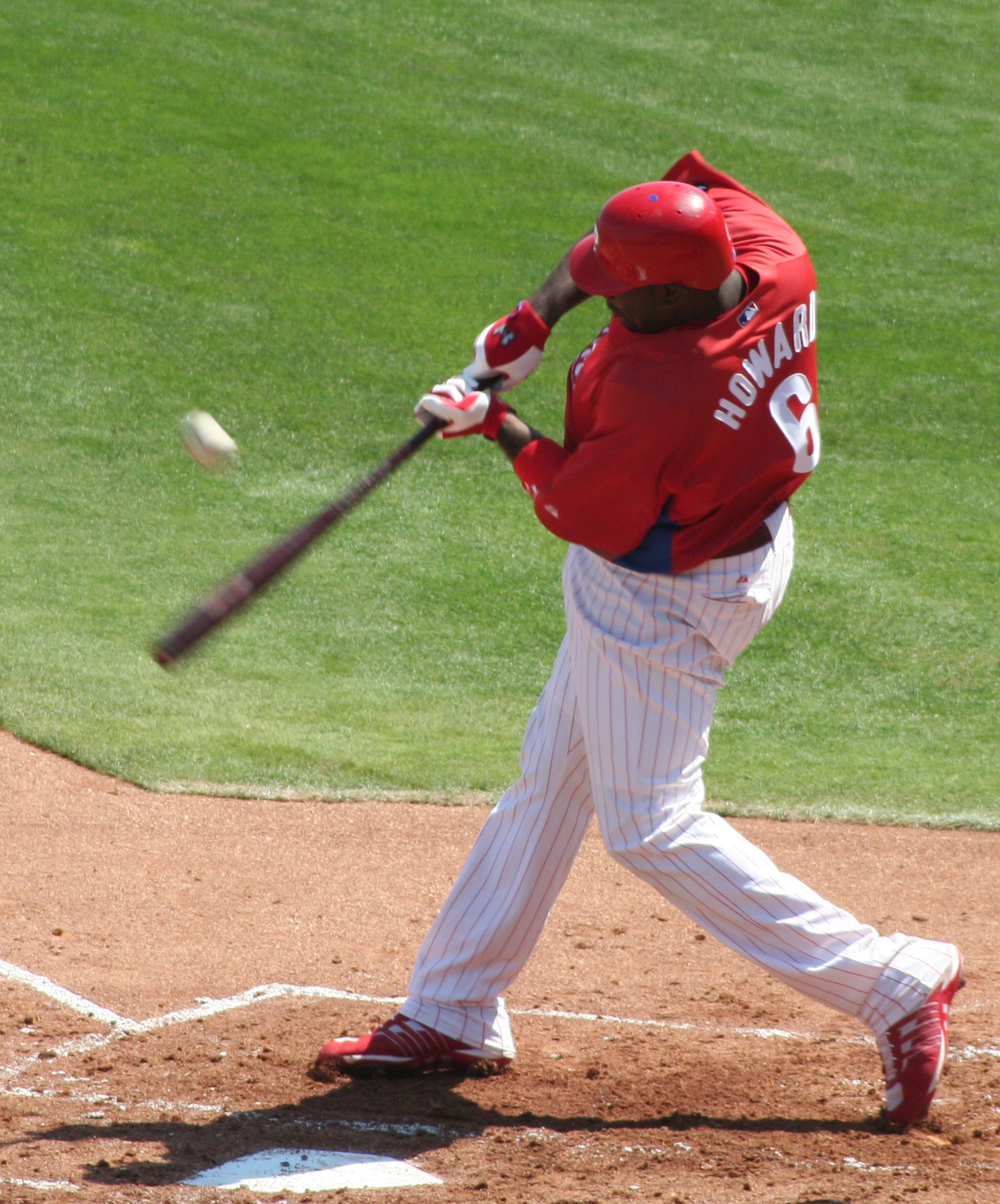
Though he slumped early and struck out often, Ryan Howard found himself among the league leaders in home runs all season, and won both the home run and RBI titles in the National League.

In a move to bolster their starting rotation in preparation for the pennant race, the Phillies traded three minor league players, including second baseman Adrian Cardenas, pitcher Josh Outman, and outfielder Matthew Spencer to the Oakland Athletics for starting pitcher Joe Blanton on July 17. The move would prove necessary, as Blanton's start was the only game of their next series against the Mets that the Phillies would win; bullpen pitchers earned the victory (Chad Durbin) or suffered the loss (Ryan Madson and Romero) in each game of the series. The Phillies managed to go 7–5 after the All-Star break within their own division, dropping series to the Marlins and Mets, but besting the Braves and sweeping the Nationals. Brad Lidge posted a save in six straight Phillies wins, and the team ended the month on a five-game winning streak, with a final record of 15–10.

==== August ====
The Phillies opened August by taking two of three from the Cardinals, though they followed that by dropping a series to the Marlins. On August 7, the Phillies acquired left-handed reliever Scott Eyre from the Cubs. After taking two of three from the Pittsburgh Pirates, the Phillies went west for their first trip to Dodger Stadium, dropping three consecutive games to the Los Angeles Dodgers. The first game saw the team sacrifice a 7-run lead that they could not overcome, and the second two of the series were both blown by the bullpen. The Dodgers' sweep in Los Angeles was completed as the Phillies dropped the last game of the series, leaving them out of first place in the division. However, the Phillies struck back, taking two of three from both the Padres and the Nationals, and completing a revenge sweep of the Dodgers at Citizens Bank Park. The following evening, the Phillies saw starter Jamie Moyer give up seven runs over the first three innings of their game against the Mets. However, the offense made up that deficit by scoring the tying run in the ninth; catcher Chris Coste capped the comeback by going four-for-four coming off of the bench and driving in the winning run with a bases-loaded single to deep center in the bottom of the 13th inning. They ended up splitting the short series with the Mets and the next four-game series against the Cubs to close out the "dog days" of summer.

==== September ====
Fan celebrated Brad Lidge's perfect season at the World Series parade.

With a nearly-full slate of division rivals in the final month, the Phillies opened by dropping series to the Nationals and Marlins, with a 2–1 series win over division leaders New York between the two losses. However, they pushed back into contention on the back of strong pitching, sweeping the Brewers over a four-game set while allowing only eight runs. Brett Myers' return to the rotation in late July bolstered the strength of the Phillies' starters toward the end of the season; he boasted a 7–2 record and a 1.80 ERA from his return until September 15. Taking their winning ways south to Atlanta, the Phillies completed a series sweep of the Braves; the Phillies also swept the Braves at Turner Field for the season and handed the Braves franchise its first nine-game home losing streak against a single team since 1909. With an 8–4 win over the Washington Nationals on September 26, the Phillies secured their first 90-win season since 1993. The next day, the Phillies clinched the NL East Division title for the second consecutive season, beating the Nationals by a score of 4–3. Jamie Moyer contributed a one-run, six-hit performance over six innings and Jayson Werth led off the fifth inning with a home run. They won the division title as Brad Lidge earned his 41st consecutive save on a game-ending double play. Having gone an entire season without losing a save opportunity, Lidge was recognized as 2008's National League Comeback Player of the Year.

=== Season standings ===
==== National League East ====
NL East
Team	W	L	Pct.	GB	Home	Road
Philadelphia Phillies	92	70	.568	—	48‍–‍33	44‍–‍37
New York Mets	89	73	.549	3	48‍–‍33	41‍–‍40
Florida Marlins	84	77	.522	7½	45‍–‍36	39‍–‍41
Atlanta Braves	72	90	.444	20	43‍–‍38	29‍–‍52
Washington Nationals	59	102	.366	32½	34‍–‍46	25‍–‍56

==== Record vs. opponents ====
2008 National League record Source: MLB Standings Grid – 2008
Team	AZ	ATL	CHC	CIN	COL	FLA	HOU	LAD	MIL	NYM	PHI	PIT	SD	SF	STL	WAS	AL
Arizona	–	3–5	2–4	2–4	15–3	2–7	4–2	8–10	2–5	3–3	3–4	4–3	10–8	11–7	3–4	4–2	6–9
Atlanta	5–3	–	0–6	3–3	4–3	10–8	3–3	4–2	3–6	11–7	4–14	2–5	5–1	2–5	2–5	6–12	8–7
Chicago	4–2	6–0	–	8–7	5–1	4–3	8–9	5–2	9–7	4–2	3–4	14–4	5–2	4–3	9–6	3–3	6–9
Cincinnati	4–2	3–3	7–8	–	1–5	6–2	3–12	1–7	10–8	3–4	3–5	6–9	4–3	5–1	5–10	4–3	9–6
Colorado	3–15	3–4	1–5	5–1	–	5–3	3–3	8–10	4–3	3–6	0–5	5–2	9–9	11–7	3–4	4–3	7–8
Florida	7–2	8–10	3–4	2–6	3–5	–	4–2	3–4	5–1	8–10	10–8	3–2	4–2	3–3	2–5	14–3	5–10
Houston	2–4	3–3	9–8	12–3	3–3	2–4	–	4–3	7–8	5–2	3–4	8–8	3–3	7–1	7–8	4–2	7–11
Los Angeles	10–8	2–4	2–5	7–1	10–8	4–3	3–4	–	4–2	3–4	4–4	5–2	11–7	9–9	2–4	3–3	5–10
Milwaukee	5–2	6–3	7–9	8–10	3–4	1–5	8–7	2–4	–	2–4	1–5	14–1	4–3	6–0	10–5	6–2	7–8
New York	3–3	7–11	2–4	4–3	6–3	10–8	2–5	4–3	4–2	–	11–7	4–3	2–5	5–1	4–3	12–6	9–6
Philadelphia	4–3	14–4	4–3	5–3	5–0	8–10	4–3	4–4	5–1	7–11	–	4–2	4–2	3–3	5–4	12–6	4–11
Pittsburgh	3–4	5–2	4–14	9–6	2–5	2–3	8–8	2–5	1–14	3–4	2–4	–	3–4	4–2	10–7	3–4	6–9
San Diego	8–10	1–5	2–5	3–4	9–9	2–4	3–3	7–11	3–4	5–2	2–4	4–3	–	5–13	1–6	5–1	3–15
San Francisco	7–11	5–2	3–4	1–5	7–11	3–3	1–7	9–9	0–6	1–5	3–3	2–4	13–5	–	4–3	7–0	6–12
St. Louis	4–3	5–2	6–9	10–5	4–3	5–2	8–7	4–2	5–10	3–4	4–5	7–10	6–1	3–4	–	5–1	7–8
Washington	2–4	12–6	3–3	3–4	3–4	3–14	2–4	3–3	2–6	6–12	6–12	4–3	1–5	0–7	1–5	–	8–10

=== Game log ===
2008 game log
March (0–1)

#	Date	Opponent	Score	Win	Loss	Save	Attendance	Record
1	March 31	Nationals	11–6	Rivera (1–0)	**Gordon** (0–1)		44,553	0–1

April (15–12)

#	Date	Opponent	Score	Win	Loss	Save	Attendance	Record
2	April 2	Nationals	1–0	Redding (1–0)	**Hamels** (0–1)	Rauch (1)	44,986	0–2
3	April 3	Nationals	8–7 (10)	**Condrey** (1–0)	Colome (0–1)		25,831	1–2
4	April 4	@ Reds	8–4	**Kendrick** (1–0)	Fogg (0–1)		17,905	2–2
5	April 5	@ Reds	4–3	Cordero (1–0)	**Durbin** (0–1)		23,069	2–3
6	April 6	@ Reds	8–2	Vólquez (1–0)	**Myers** (0–1)		26,566	2–4
7	April 7	@ Reds	5–3	**Hamels** (1–1)	Arroyo (0–1)	**Lidge** (1)	14,647	3–4
8	April 8	@ Mets	5–2	**Moyer** (1–0)	Pérez (0–1)	**Gordon** (1)	56,350	4–4
9	April 9	@ Mets	8–2	Pelfrey (1–0)	**Kendrick** (1–1)		47,127	4–5
10	April 10	@ Mets	4–3 (12)	Sosa (1–0)	**Gordon** (0–2)		49,049	4–6
11	April 11	Cubs	5–3	**Myers** (1–1)	Zambrano (1–1)	**Lidge** (2)	37,368	5–6
12	April 12	Cubs	7–1	**Hamels** (2–1)	Lilly (0–2)		45,072	6–6
13	April 13	Cubs	6–5 (10)	Wood (1–0)	**Seánez** (0–1)	Howry (1)	40,095	6–7
14	April 15	Astros	4–3	**Seánez** (1–1)	Valverde (2–1)		34,609	7–7
15	April 16	Astros	2–1	Oswalt (1–3)	**Kendrick** (1–2)	Brocail (1)	31,644	7–8
16	April 17	Astros	10–2	**Myers** (2–1)	Backe (1–2)		33,526	8–8
17	April 18	Mets	6–4	Santana (2–2)	**Hamels** (2–2)	Wagner (3)	45,156	8–9
18	April 19	Mets	4–2	Pérez (2–0)	**Moyer** (1–1)	Wagner (4)	45,149	8–10
19	April 20	Mets	5–4	**Romero** (1–0)	Feliciano (0–1)	**Lidge** (3)	45,173	9–10
20	April 21	@ Rockies	9–5	**Seánez** (2–1)	Buchholz (1–1)		24,886	10–10
21	April 22	@ Rockies	8–6	**Madson** (1–0)	Corpas (0–1)	**Lidge** (4)	26,665	11–10
22	April 23	@ Brewers	5–4	Stetter (1–0)	**Hamels** (2–3)	Turnbow (3)	30,548	11–11
23	April 24	@ Brewers	3–1	**Gordon** (1–2)	Riske 0–1	**Lidge** (5)	23,905	12–11
24	April 25	@ Pirates	6–5	**Gordon** (2–2)	Duke (0–2)	**Lidge** (6)	23,930	13–11
25	April 26	@ Pirates	8–4	**Kendrick** (2–2)	Morris (0–4)		24,791	14–11
26	April 27	@ Pirates	5–1	Maholm (2–2)	**Myers** (2–2)		17,588	14–12
27	April 29	Padres	7–4	**Hamels** (3–3)	Maddux (2–2)		34,207	15–12
28	April 30	Padres	4–2	Young (2–2)	**Moyer** (1–2)	Hoffman (5)	36,648	15–13

May (17–12)

#	Date	Opponent	Score	Win	Loss	Save	Attendance	Record
29	May 1	Padres	3–2	**Gordon** (3–2)	Thatcher (0–3)	**Lidge** (7)	33,001	16–13
30	May 2	Giants	6–5 (10)	**Romero** (2–0)	Wilson (0–1)		38,270	17–13
31	May 3	Giants	3–2 (10)	Taschner (1–0)	**Seánez** (2–2)	Wilson (10)	43,804	17–14
32	May 4	Giants	6–5	**Lidge** (1–0)	Yabu (2–2)		45,110	18–14
33	May 5	@ D-backs	11–4	**Moyer** (2–2)	Scherzer (0–1)		21,266	19–14
34	May 6	@ D-backs	6–4	Johnson (2–1)	**Eaton** (0–1)	Lyon (10)	26,234	19–15
35	May 7	@ D-backs	5–4	**Romero** (3–0)	Qualls (0–3)	**Lidge** (8)	21,260	20–15
36	May 8	@ D-backs	8–3	Webb (8–0)	**Myers** (2–3)		21,942	20–16
37	May 9	@ Giants	7–4	**Hamels** (4–3)	Walker (1–1)	**Lidge** (9)	33,796	21–16
38	May 10	@ Giants	8–2	Lincecum (5–1)	**Moyer** (2–3)		34,064	21–17
39	May 11	@ Giants	4–3	Taschner (2–0)	**Romero** (3–1)	Wilson (11)	35,999	21–18
40	May 13	Braves	5–4	**Kendrick** (3–2)	Reyes (0–1)	**Lidge** (10)	44,101	22–18
41	May 14	Braves	8–6	Glavine (1–1)	**Myers** (2–4)	Boyer (1)	36,001	22–19
42	May 15	Braves	5–0	**Hamels** (5–3)	James (2–3)		34,120	23–19
43	May 16	Blue Jays	10–3	**Moyer** (3–3)	Purcey (0–1)		36,600	24–19
44	May 17	Blue Jays	6–3	Burnett (4–4)	**Eaton** (0–2)	Ryan (8)	42,604	24–20
45	May 18	Blue Jays	6–5	Frasor (1–0)	**Seánez** (2–3)	Ryan (9)	42,858	24–21
46	May 19	@ Nationals	4–0	Redding (6–3)	**Myers** (2–5)		25,394	24–22
47	May 20	@ Nationals	1–0	**Gordon** (4–2)	Rauch (2–1)	**Lidge** (11)	28,105	25–22
48	May 21	@ Nationals	12–2	**Moyer** (4–3)	Chico (0–6)	**Condrey** (1)	28,055	26–22
49	May 22	@ Astros	7–5	**Durbin** (1–1)	Wright (3–2)	**Lidge** (12)	29,263	27–22
50	May 23	@ Astros	4–3	Backe (4–3)	**Eaton** (0–3)	Valverde (15)	41,152	27–23
51	May 24	@ Astros	4–3	Moehler (2–1)	**Myers** (2–6)	Brocail (2)	42,660	27–24
52	May 25	@ Astros	15–6	**Seánez** (3–3)	Nieve (0–1)		43,079	28–24
53	May 26^{[a]}	Rockies	20–5	**Moyer** (5–3)	de la Rosa (1–3)		44,764	29–24
54	May 27	Rockies	7–4	**Kendrick** (4–2)	Jiménez (1–5)		34,716	30–24
55	May 28	Rockies	6–1	**Eaton** (1–3)	Reynolds (0–2)		39,845	31–24
56	May 30	Marlins	12–3	**Myers** (3–6)	Hendrickson (7–3)		45,118	32–24
57	May 31	Marlins	7–3	Nolasco (5–3)	**Hamels** (5–4)		45,261	32–25

June (12–14)

#	Date	Opponent	Score	Win	Loss	Save	Attendance	Record
58	June 1	Marlins	7–5	**Moyer** (6–3)	Waechter (0–1)	**Lidge** (13)	45,312	33–25
59	June 2^{[b]}	Reds	5–4	**Kendrick** (5–2)	Arroyo (4–5)	**Lidge** (14)	38,530	34–25
60	June 3	Reds	3–2	**Eaton** (2–3)	Harang (2–8)	**Lidge** (15)	45,096	35–25
61	June 4	Reds	2–0	Vólquez (8–2)	**Myers** (3–7)	F. Cordero (12)	45,223	35–26
62	June 5	Reds	5–0	**Hamels** (6–4)	Bailey (0–1)		45,492	36–26
63	June 6	@ Braves	4–3 (10)	**Gordon** (5–2)	Acosta (3–4)	**Lidge** (16)	34,074	37–26
64	June 7	@ Braves	6–2	**Romero** (4–1)	Reyes (2–4)		43,854	38–26
65	June 8	@ Braves	6–3	**Durbin** (2–1)	Boyer (1–4)	**Lidge** (17)	33,370	39–26
66	June 10	@ Marlins	5–4	Nolasco (6–4)	**Myers** (3–8)	Gregg (12)	12,411	39–27
67	June 11	@ Marlins	6–2	Gregg (5–2)	**Gordon** (5–3)		14,122	39–28
68	June 12	@ Marlins	3–0	**Moyer** (7–3)	Olsen (4–3)	**Lidge** (18)	15,202	40–28
69	June 13^{[c]}	@ Cardinals	20–2	**Kendrick** (6–2)	Wellemeyer (7–2)		44,376	41–28
70	June 14	@ Cardinals	3–2	Lohse (8–2)	**Eaton** (2–4)	Franklin (9)	45,089	41–29
71	June 15	@ Cardinals	7–6 (10)	Reyes (2–1)	**Gordon** (5–4)		45,391	41–30
72	June 16	Red Sox	8–2	**Hamels** (7–4)	Colón (4–2)		45,026	42–30
73	June 17	Red Sox	3–0	Lester (6–3)	**Moyer** (7–4)	Papelbon (20)	45,160	42–31
74	June 18	Red Sox	7–4	Masterson (4–1)	**Kendrick** (6–3)	Papelbon (21)	45,187	42–32
75	June 20	Angels	7–1	E. Santana (9–3)	**Eaton** (2–5)		45,033	42–33
76	June 21	Angels	6–2	Saunders (11–3)	**Myers** (3–9)	Rodríguez (29)	45,196	42–34
77	June 22	Angels	3–2	Weaver (7–7)	**Hamels** (7–5)	Rodríguez (30)	44,571	42–35
78	June 24	@ Athletics	5–2	Blanton (4–10)	**Moyer** (7–5)	Street (14)	13,348	42–36
79	June 25	@ Athletics	4–0	**Kendrick** (7–3)	Smith (4–6)		22,231	43–36
80	June 26	@ Athletics	5–0	Harden (5–0)	**Eaton** (2–6)		17,228	43–37
81	June 27	@ Rangers	8–7	Rupe (3–1)	**Condrey** (1–1)	Wilson (17)	28,623	43–38
82	June 28	@ Rangers	8–6	**Hamels** (8–5)	Padilla (10–4)	**Lidge** (19)	35,039	44–38
83	June 29	@ Rangers	5–1	Hurley (1–1)	**Moyer** (7–6)		26,283	44–39

July (15–10)

#	Date	Opponent	Score	Win	Loss	Save	Attendance	Record
84	July 1	@ Braves	8–3	**Kendrick** (8–3)	Morton (1–2)		29,206	45–39
85	July 2	@ Braves	7–3	**Eaton** (3–6)	Campillo (3–3)		30,138	46–39
86	July 3	@ Braves	4–1	**Hamels** (9–5)	Jurrjens (8–4)	**Gordon** (2)	28,805	47–39
87	July 4	Mets	3–2	**Lidge** (2–0)	Sánchez (3–1)		44,922	48–39
88	July 5	Mets	9–4	Feliciano (1–2)	**Romero** (4–2)		45,190	48–40
89	July 6	Mets	4–2 (12)	Smith (1–1)	**Durbin** (2–2)		45,203	48–41
90	July 7	Mets	10–9	Martínez (3–2)	**Eaton** (3–7)	Wagner (20)	44,655	48–42
91	July 8	Cardinals	2–0	Piñeiro (3–4)	**Hamels** (9–6)	Franklin (12)	41,519	48–43
92	July 9	Cardinals	4–2	**Condrey** (2–1)	McClellan (1–4)	**Lidge** (20)	44,951	49–43
93	July 10	Cardinals	4–1	**Moyer** (8–6)	Looper (9–7)	**Romero** (1)	44,241	50–43
94	July 11	D-backs	6–5 (12)	**Seánez** (4–3)	Robertson (0–1)		45,028	51–43
95	July 12	D-backs	10–4	Johnson (6–7)	**Eaton** (3–8)		45,006	51–44
96	July 13	D-backs	6–3	**Madson** (2–0)	Qualls (2–7)		45,277	52–44
All-Star Break: AL def. NL at Yankee Stadium, 4–3 (15)
97	July 18	@ Marlins	4–2	**Moyer** (9–6)	Nolasco (10–5)	**Lidge** (21)	23,124	53–44
98	July 19	@ Marlins	9–5	Olsen (6–4)	**Kendrick** (8–4)		26,520	53–45
99	July 20	@ Marlins	3–2 (11)	Waechter (2–2)	**Condrey** (2–2)		17,724	53–46
100	July 22	@ Mets	8–6	**Durbin** (3–2)	Smith (1–2)	**Lidge** (22)	55,081	54–46
101	July 23	@ Mets	6–3	Maine (9–7)	**Madson** (2–1)	Wagner (25)	53,444	54–47
102	July 24	@ Mets	3–1	Heilman (1–3)	**Romero** (4–3)	Wagner (26)	50,962	54–48
103	July 25	Braves	8–2	Jurrjens (10–5)	**Kendrick** (8–5)		45,114	54–49
104	July 26^{[d]}	Braves	10–9	**Eaton** (4–8)	Boyer (2–6)	**Lidge** (23)	45,107	55–49
105	July 27	Braves	12–10	**Condrey** (3–2)	Tavárez (0–3)	**Lidge** (24)	45,096	56–49
106	July 29	@ Nationals	2–1	**Myers** (4–9)	Balester (1–3)	**Lidge** (25)	34,039	57–49
107	July 30	@ Nationals	8–5	**Moyer** (10–6)	Redding (7–6)	**Lidge** (26)	31,798	58–49
108	July 31	@ Nationals	8–4	**Kendrick** (9–5)	Lannan (6–11)		31,658	59–49

August (16–12)

#	Date	Opponent	Score	Win	Loss	Save	Attendance	Record
109	August 1	@ Cardinals	6–3	Lohse (13–3)	**Hamels** (9–7)	Isringhausen (12)	44,234	59–50
110	August 2	@ Cardinals	2–1	**Blanton** (6–12)	Looper (10–9)	**Lidge** (27)	45,450	60–50
111	August 3	@ Cardinals	5–4	**Durbin** (4–2)	García (0–1)	**Lidge** (28)	44,655	61–50
112	August 5	Marlins	8–2	Johnson (2–0)	**Moyer** (10–7)		44,896	61–51
113	August 6	Marlins	5–0	**Kendrick** (10–5)	Sánchez (1–1)		45,078	62–51
114	August 7	Marlins	3–0	Volstad (3–2)	**Hamels** (9–8)	Gregg (25)	45,521	62–52
115	August 8	Pirates	2–0 (12)	Beam (1–1)	**Walrond** (0–1)	Hansen (3)	43,891	62–53
116	August 9	Pirates	4–2	**Myers** (5–9)	Snell (4–9)	**Durbin** (1)	45,060	63–53
117	August 10	Pirates	6–3	**Eyre** (3–0)	Yates (4–3)	**Madson** (1)	45,262	64–53
118	August 11	@ Dodgers	8–6	Lowe (9–10)	**Kendrick** (10–6)	Broxton (8)	45,547	64–54
119	August 12	@ Dodgers	4–3	Kuo (4–2)	**Romero** (4–4)		47,586	64–55
120	August 13	@ Dodgers	7–6	Broxton (3–3)	**Condrey** (3–3)		45,786	64–56
121	August 14	@ Dodgers	3–1	Kuroda (7–8)	**Myers** (5–10)	Kuo (1)	51,060	64–57
122	August 15	@ Padres	1–0	**Moyer** (11–7)	Maddux (6–9)	**Lidge** (29)	37,558	65–57
123	August 16	@ Padres	8–3	Reineke (1–0)	**Kendrick** (10–7)		33,956	65–58
124	August 17	@ Padres	2–1	**Hamels** (10–8)	Baek (4–7)	**Lidge** (30)	34,756	66–58
125	August 19	Nationals	5–4	**Madson** (3–1)	Shell (0–1)	**Lidge** (31)	44,143	67–58
126	August 20	Nationals	4–0	**Myers** (6–10)	Balester (2–6)		45,166	68–58
127	August 21	Nationals	4–3	Rivera (4–5)	**Madson** (3–2)	**Hanrahan** (4)	41,568	68–59
128	August 22	Dodgers	8–1	**Kendrick** (11–7)	Maddux (6–10)		42,620	69–59
129	August 23	Dodgers	9–2	**Hamels** (11–8)	Kershaw (2–4)		45,019	70–59
130	August 24	Dodgers	5–2 (11)	**Durbin** (5–2)	Beimel (4–1)		43,039	71–59
131	August 25	Dodgers	5–0	**Myers** (7–10)	Billingsley (12–10)		40,873	72–59
132	August 26	Mets	8–7 (13)	**Seánez** (5–3)	Schoeneweis (2–3)		45,204	73–59
133	August 27	Mets	6–3	Stokes (1–0)	**Seánez** (5–4)	Ayala (2)	45,138	73–60
134	August 28	@ Cubs	6–4	Howry (6–4)	**Durbin** (5–3)	Wood (28)	40,362	73–61
135	August 29	@ Cubs	3–2	Samardzija (1–0)	**Condrey** (3–4)	Mármol (7)	40,844	73–62
136	August 30	@ Cubs	5–2	**Myers** (8–10)	Lilly (13–8)	**Lidge** (32)	41,511	74–62
137	August 31	@ Cubs	5–3	**Moyer** (12–7)	S. Marshall	**Lidge** (33)	41,544	75–62

September (17–8)

#	Date	Opponent	Score	Win	Loss	Save	Attendance	Record
138	September 1	@ Nationals	7–4	Redding (10–8)	**Kendrick** (11–8)		28,393	75–63
139	September 2	@ Nationals	4–0	**Hamels** (12–8)	Lannan (8–13)		23,150	76–63
140	September 3	@ Nationals	9–7	Rivera (5–5)	**Durbin** (5–4)		23,122	76–64
141	September 5	@ Mets	3–0	**Myers** (9–10)	Pelfrey (13–9)	**Lidge** (34)	48,302	77–64
—	September 6	Postponed due to weather (September 7)						
142	September 7	@ Mets (DH-1)	6–2	**Moyer** (13–7)	Martínez (5–4)		55,797	78–64
143	September 7	@ Mets (DH-2)	6–3	Santana (13–7)	**Hamels** (12–9)		54,980	78–65
144	September 8	Marlins	8–6	**Blanton** (7–12)	Sánchez (2–4)	**Lidge** (35)	38,921	79–65
145	September 9	Marlins	10–8	Gregg (7–8)	**Kendrick** (11–9)	Lindstrom (2)	40,554	79–66
146	September 10	Marlins	7–3	Nolasco (14–7)	**Myers** (9–11)		38,665	79–67
147	September 11	Brewers	6–3	**Moyer** (14–7)	Sheets (13–8)	**Lidge** (36)	39,994	80–67
—	September 12	Postponed due to weather (September 14)						
148	September 13	Brewers	7–3	**Hamels** (13–9)	Parra (10–8)		45,105	81–67
149	September 14	Brewers (DH-1)	7–3	**Eyre** (4–0)	Mota (5–6)		43,950	82–67
150	September 14	Brewers (DH-2)	6–1	**Myers** (10–11)	Suppan (10–9)		39,776	83–67
151	September 16	@ Braves	8–7	**Madson** (4–2)	González (0–3)	**Lidge** (37)	30,319	84–67
152	September 17	@ Braves	6–1	**Happ** (1–0)	Jurrjens (13–10)		32,821	85–67
153	September 18	@ Braves	4–3	**Hamels** (14–9)	Hampton (2–3)	**Lidge** (38)	39,070	86–67
154	September 19	@ Marlins	14–8	Johnson (6–1)	**Myers** (10–12)		20,202	86–68
155	September 20	@ Marlins	3–2	**Blanton** (8–12)	Sánchez (2–5)	**Lidge** (39)	28,757	87–68
156	September 21	@ Marlins	5–2	**Moyer** (15–7)	Volstad (5–4)	**Lidge** (40)	28,173	88–68
157	September 22	Braves	6–2	**Eyre** (5–0)	Bennett (3–7)		36,796	89–68
158	September 23	Braves	3–2	Hampton (3–3)	**Hamels** (14–10)	González (14)	39,322	89–69
159	September 24	Braves	10–4	Carlyle (2–0)	**Myers** (10–13)		41,430	89–70
160	September 26	Nationals	8–4	**Blanton** (9–12)	Balester (3–7)		44,145	90–70
161	September 27	Nationals	4–3	**Moyer** (16–7)	Lannan (9–15)	**Lidge** (41)	45,177	91–70
162	September 28	Nationals	8–3	**Walrond** (1–1)	Pérez (7–12)		44,945	92–70

- Phillies win
- Phillies loss
- Postponement
- Bold: Phillies team member
Source: baseball-reference.com

=== Postseason game log ===
2008 Postseason game log
NLDS: 3–1

#	Date	Opponent	Score	Win	Loss	Save	Attendance	Record
1	October 1	Brewers	3–1	**Hamels** (1–0)	Gallardo (0–1)	**Lidge** (1)	45,929	1–0
2	October 2	Brewers	5–2	**Myers** (1–0)	Sabathia (0–1)	**Lidge** (2)	46,208	2–0
3	October 4	@ Brewers	1–4	Bush (1–0)	**Moyer** (0–1)	Torres (1)	43,992	2–1
4	October 5	@ Brewers	6–2	**Blanton** (1–0)	Suppan (0–1)		43,934	3–1

NLCS: 4–1

#	Date	Opponent	Score	Win	Loss	Save	Attendance	Record
1	October 9	Dodgers	3–2	**Hamels** (1–0)	Lowe (0–1)	**Lidge** (1)	45,839	1–0
2	October 10	Dodgers	8–5	**Myers** (1–0)	Billingsley (0–1)	**Lidge** (2)	45,883	2–0
3	October 12	@ Dodgers	2–7	Kuroda (1–0)	**Moyer** (0–1)		56,800	2–1
4	October 13	@ Dodgers	7–5	**Madson** (1–0)	Wade (0–1)	**Lidge** (3)	56,800	3–1
5	October 15	@ Dodgers	5–1	**Hamels** (2–0)	Billingsley (0–2)		56,800	4–1

World Series: 4–1

#	Date	Opponent	Score	Win	Loss	Save	Attendance	Record
1	October 22	@ Rays	3–2	**Hamels** (1–0)	Kazmir (0–1)	**Lidge** (1)	40,783	1–0
2	October 23	@ Rays	2–4	Shields (1–0)	**Myers** (0–1)		40,843	1–1
3	October 25	Rays	5–4	**Romero** (1–0)	Howell (0–1)		45,900	2–1
4	October 26	Rays	10–2	**Blanton** (1–0)	Sonnanstine (0–1)		45,903	3–1
5	October 27, 29	Rays	4–3	**Romero** (2–0)	Howell (0–2)	**Lidge** (2)	45,940	4–1

=== Roster ===
All players who made an appearance for the Phillies during 2008 are included.

†	Indicates players who started on Opening Day in 2008

2008 Philadelphia Phillies roster
**Roster**
**Pitchers**: 56 Joe Blanton; 46 Andrew Carpenter; 55 Clay Condrey; 37 Chad Durbin; 21 Adam Eaton; 47 Scott Eyre; 45 Tom Gordon; 35 Cole Hamels; 43 J. A. Happ; 38 Kyle Kendrick; 54 Brad Lidge; 63 Ryan Madson; 50 Jamie Moyer; 39 Brett Myers ^{†}; 16 J. C. Romero; 57 Rudy Seánez; 56 R. J. Swindle; 44 Les Walrond	**Catchers**: 27 Chris Coste; 3 Lou Marson; 51 Carlos Ruiz ^{†}; **Infielders**: 4 Eric Bruntlett; 24 Mike Cervenak; 19 Greg Dobbs; 7 Pedro Feliz ^{†}; 18 Brad Harman; 6 Ryan Howard ^{†}; 9 Tadahito Iguchi; 11 Jimmy Rollins ^{†}; 33 Andy Tracy; 26 Chase Utley ^{†}	**Outfielders**: 12 T. J. Bohn; 5 Pat Burrell ^{†}; 40 Greg Golson; 10 Geoff Jenkins; 9 Chris Snelling; 12 Matt Stairs; 99 So Taguchi; 8 Shane Victorino ^{†}; 28 Jayson Werth ^{†}	**Manager**: 41 Charlie Manuel; **General manager**: -- Pat Gillick; **Coaches**: 22 Jimy Williams (bench); 15 Davey Lopes (1B); 2 Steve Smith (3B); 25 Milt Thompson (hitting); 30 Rich Dubee (pitching); 31 Ramon Henderson (bullpen); 29 Roly de Armas (interim bullpen); 17 Mick Billmeyer (catching); 3 Jerry Martin (interim 1B)

== Postseason ==
=== National League Division Series ===
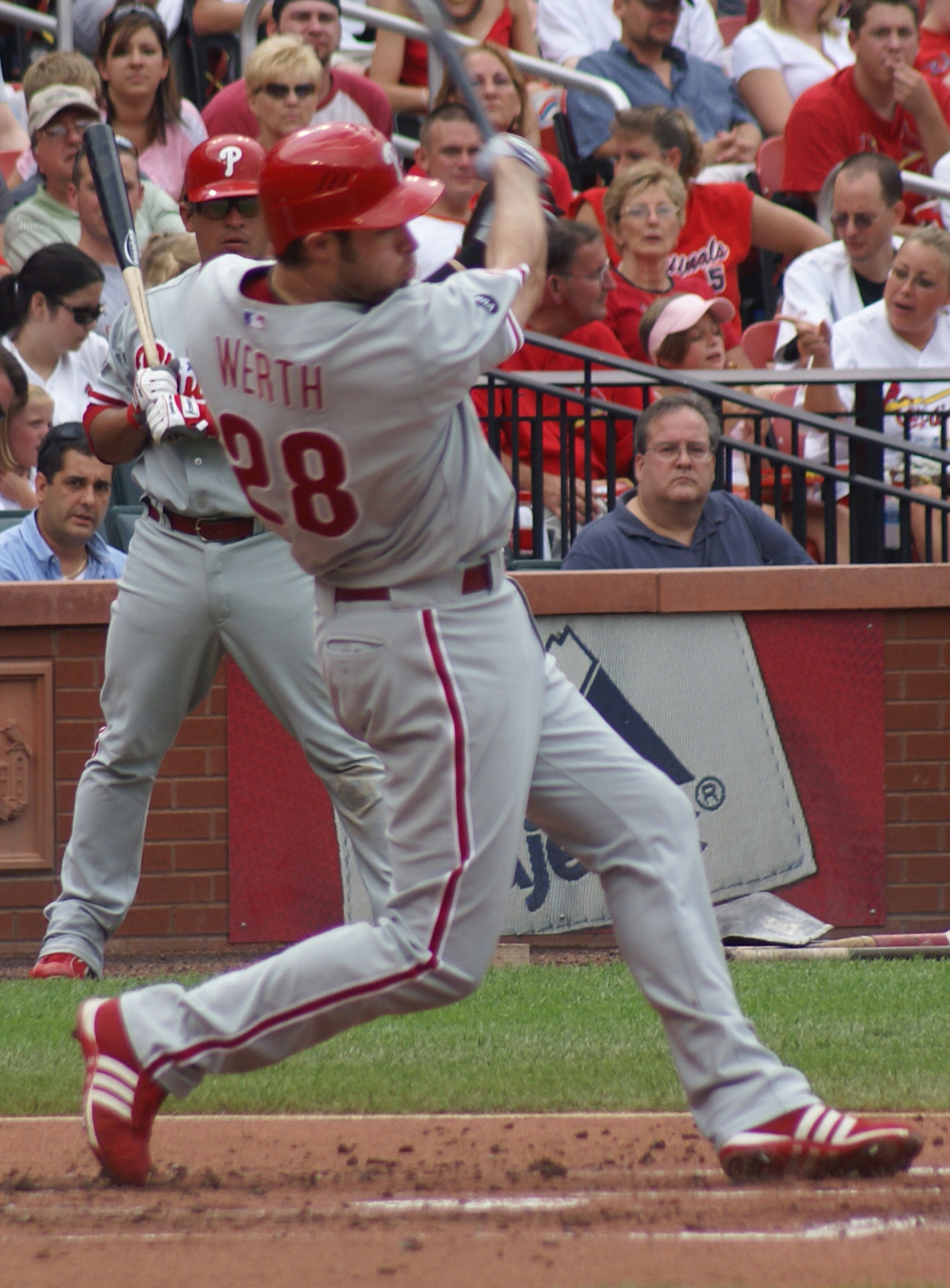
Jayson Werth wielded a hot bat in the 2008 NLDS.

Following their four-game sweep of Milwaukee in the beginning of September, the Phillies recorded their first playoff win since their 1993 World Series appearance on October 1, defeating the Brewers in Game 1. Cole Hamels was the victor, earning his first career playoff win. Hamels allowed no runs and two hits over his eight innings of work. Chase Utley batted in two runs, while Ryan Howard walked three times in the game. In Game 2, Shane Victorino's grand slam was all the run support starter Brett Myers needed, as he pitched seven innings and allowed only two runs. The Phillies' second consecutive victory was also supported by a pair of doubles from Victorino and from Jayson Werth. In a reversal of fortune, the Brewers scored two runs in the first inning of Game 3, and it proved to be enough to win the game. Brewers starter Dave Bush and closer Salomón Torres were able to hold off the Phillies despite a rally in the top of the ninth inning, keeping the Brewers alive for Game 4. However, the Phillies defeated the Brewers in Game 4 at Miller Park to win the series, 3–1. Jimmy Rollins, Jayson Werth and Pat Burrell all hit solo home runs, and Burrell contributed a three-run homer as well. Joe Blanton struck out seven Brewers, holding the team to one run on five hits through six innings.

==== Box scores ====
Game 1

Team	1	2	3	4	5	6	7	8	9	R	H	E
Milwaukee	0	0	0	0	0	0	0	0	1	1	4	1
Philadelphia	0	0	3	0	0	0	0	0	x	3	4	1
Starting pitchers: MIL: Yovani Gallardo (0–0); PHI: Cole Hamels (0–0); WP: Hamels (1–0) LP: Gallardo (0–1) Sv: Brad Lidge (1); Home runs: MIL: none PHI: none

Game 2

Team	1	2	3	4	5	6	7	8	9	R	H	E
Milwaukee	1	0	0	0	0	0	1	0	0	2	3	0
Philadelphia	0	5	0	0	0	0	0	0	x	5	9	1
Starting pitchers: MIL: CC Sabathia (0–0); PHI: Brett Myers (0–0); WP: Myers (1–0) LP: Sabathia (0–1) Sv: Lidge (2); Home runs: MIL: none PHI: Shane Victorino (1)

Game 3

Team	1	2	3	4	5	6	7	8	9	R	H	E
Philadelphia	0	0	0	0	0	1	0	0	0	1	9	0
Milwaukee	2	0	0	0	1	0	1	0	x	4	11	0
Starting pitchers: PHI: Jamie Moyer (0–0); MIL: Dave Bush (0–0); WP: Bush (1–0) LP: Moyer (0–1) Sv: Salomón Torres (1); Home runs: PHI: none MIL: none

Game 4

Team	1	2	3	4	5	6	7	8	9	R	H	E
Philadelphia	1	0	4	0	0	0	0	1	0	6	10	0
Milwaukee	0	0	0	0	0	0	1	1	0	2	8	0
Starting pitchers: PHI: Joe Blanton (0–0); MIL: Jeff Suppan (0–0); WP: Blanton (1–0) LP: Suppan (0–1); Home runs: PHI: Jimmy Rollins (1), Pat Burrell 2 (2), Jayson Werth (1); MIL: Prince Fielder (1)

=== National League Championship Series ===
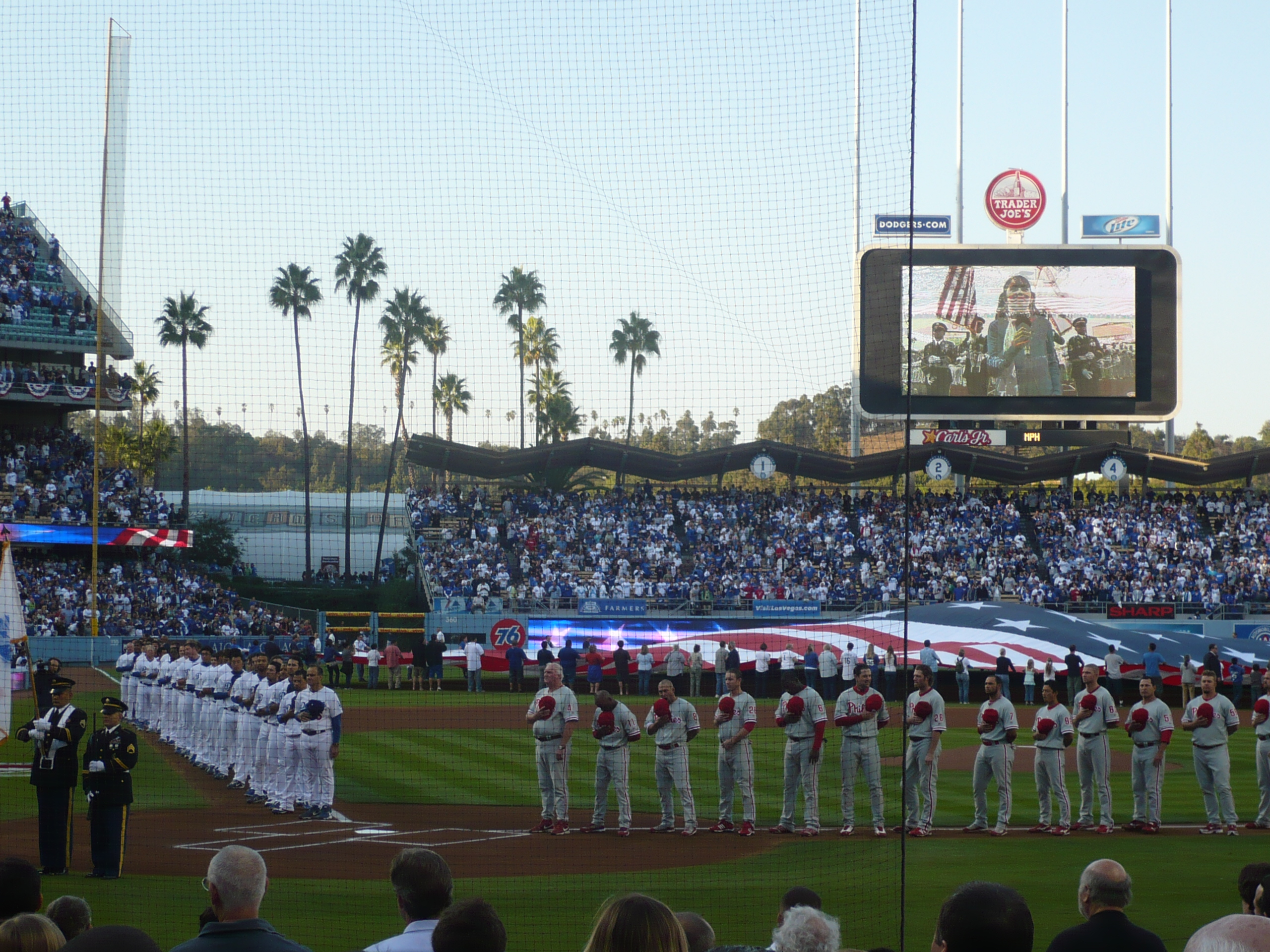
The Phillies and the Dodgers, pictured before Game 3 of the 2008 NLCS

Facing off against the Los Angeles Dodgers in the NLCS for the fourth time in history, Derek Lowe stifled the Phillies' offense for the first five innings of Game 1; however, the Phillies came from behind to score three runs in the sixth on home runs by Utley and Burrell. Hamels followed his stellar NLDS performance with a seven-inning, two-run outing, and Brad Lidge earned his 44th consecutive save in 2008. Manny Ramírez' home run could not overcome the Phillies' potent offense in Game 2, who scored four runs in both the second and third innings to win the game, 8–5. Starting pitcher Brett Myers was 3 for 3 at the plate, driving in three runs to help his own cause. He was supported by two-hit performances from Victorino and Greg Dobbs, who started at third base. Tensions escalated the following night in the third inning. After a beanball and a throw-behind by the Phillies in the previous game and no retaliation from the Dodgers, Los Angeles starter Hiroki Kuroda threw a fastball up and in to Shane Victorino, narrowly missing his head. Victorino gestured angrily, warning Kuroda to throw at other parts of his body, but not his head. This soon escalated to clearing the benches, and the Dodgers rode their momentum to the end of the game, defeating the Phillies 7–2 after posting five runs in the first inning. The Phillies staged another comeback in the following game. Down 5–3 in the eighth inning, two home runs by Shane Victorino and pinch-hitter Matt Stairs plated four runs and put the Dodgers in a hole out of which they could not climb; the Phillies won the game 7–5. In the first decisions of the series for either bullpen, right-handed reliever Ryan Madson got the win for Philadelphia, while Cory Wade suffered the loss for Los Angeles. Dodgers fans were hoping for a comeback in game five; however, Jimmy Rollins started the contest with a leadoff homer off of Chad Billingsley, who was forced out of the game in the third inning because of a pair of Phillies runs. Philadelphia added two runs on a trio of Rafael Furcal errors in the fifth. Ramírez did bring the Dodger Stadium crowd to life with a solo homer in the bottom of the sixth, but the Dodgers never threatened after that. The Phillies won the series in five games; winning pitcher Cole Hamels was named the series Most Valuable Player (MVP). Thus, the Phillies advanced to the World Series for the first time since 1993.

==== Box scores ====
Game 1

Team	1	2	3	4	5	6	7	8	9	R	H	E
Los Angeles	1	0	0	1	0	0	0	0	0	2	7	1
Philadelphia	0	0	0	0	0	3	0	0	x	3	7	0
Starting pitchers: LAD: Derek Lowe (0–0); PHI: Hamels (0–0); WP: Hamels (1–0) LP: Lowe (0–1) Sv: Lidge (1); Home runs: LAD: none PHI: Burrell (1), Utley (1)

Game 2

Team	1	2	3	4	5	6	7	8	9	R	H	E
Los Angeles	0	1	1	3	0	0	0	0	0	5	8	1
Philadelphia	0	4	4	0	0	0	0	0	x	8	11	1
Starting pitchers: LAD: Chad Billingsley (0–0); PHI: Myers (0–0); WP: Myers (1–0) LP: Billingsley (0–1) Sv: Lidge (2); Home runs: LAD: Manny Ramirez (1); PHI: none

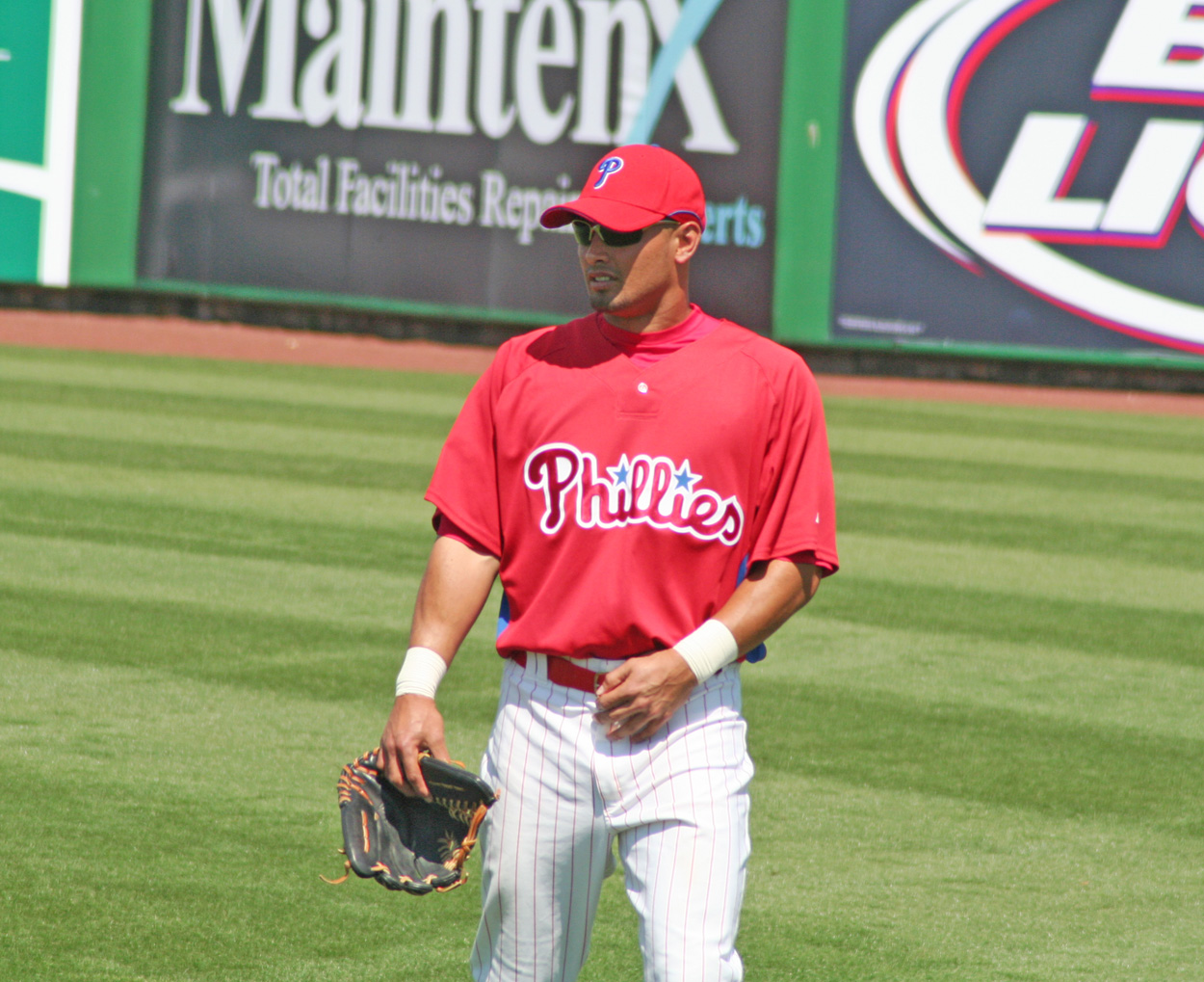
Despite hitting only 14 home runs in the regular season, Shane Victorino hit crucial home runs in both the first and second rounds of the playoffs.

Game 3

Team	1	2	3	4	5	6	7	8	9	R	H	E
Philadelphia	0	1	0	0	0	0	1	0	0	2	7	0
Los Angeles	5	1	0	1	0	0	0	0	x	7	10	0
Starting pitchers: PHI: Moyer (0–0); LAD: Hiroki Kuroda (0–0); WP: Kuroda (1–0) LP: Moyer (0–1); Home runs: PHI: none LAD: Rafael Furcal (1)

Game 4

Team	1	2	3	4	5	6	7	8	9	R	H	E
Philadelphia	2	0	0	0	0	1	0	4	0	7	12	1
Los Angeles	1	0	0	0	2	2	0	0	0	5	11	0
Starting pitchers: PHI: Blanton (0–0); LAD: Lowe (0–1); WP: Ryan Madson (1–0) LP: Cory Wade (0–1) Sv: Lidge (3); Home runs: PHI: Victorino (1), Matt Stairs (1); LAD: Casey Blake (1)

Game 5

Team	1	2	3	4	5	6	7	8	9	R	H	E
Philadelphia	1	0	2	0	2	0	0	0	0	5	8	0
Los Angeles	0	0	0	0	0	1	0	0	0	1	7	3
Starting pitchers: PHI: Cole Hamels (1–0); LAD: Chad Billingsley (0–1); WP: Hamels (2–0) LP: Billingsley (0–2); Home runs: PHI: Jimmy Rollins (1); LAD: Ramírez (2)

=== 2008 World Series ===
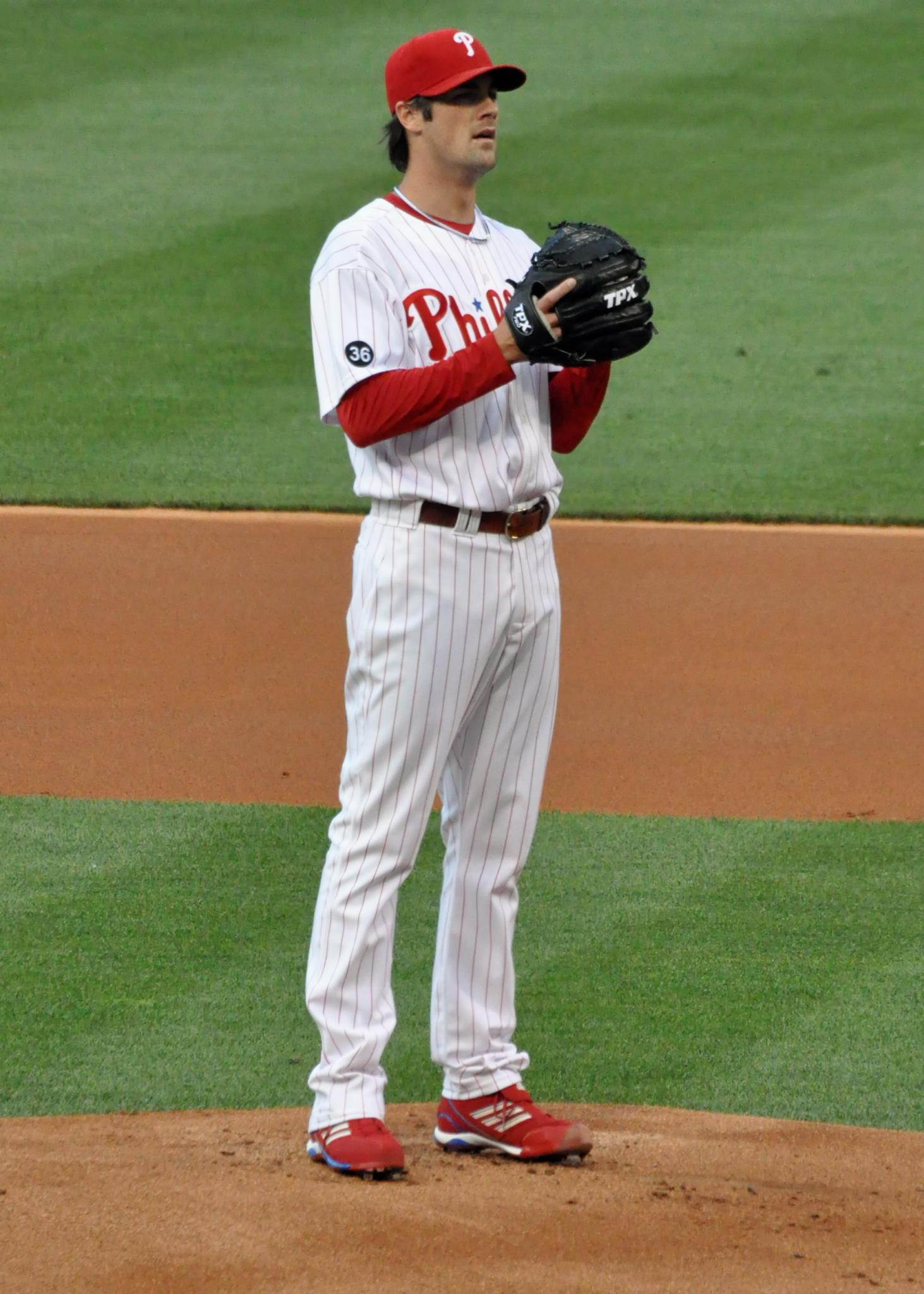
Cole Hamels, the Phillies' ace and the MVP of both the NLCS and the World Series

The Phillies played in their first Fall Classic in fifteen years, which began on October 22 against the Tampa Bay Rays. The first two games were played at Tropicana Field in St. Petersburg, followed by three games at Citizens Bank Park. The Rays had home field advantage for the series, due to an American League victory in the 2008 All-Star Game. The Phillies defeated Tampa Bay, four games to one. Starting pitcher Cole Hamels (4–0, 1.80 ERA, 30 K in the postseason) was named the series MVP.

==== Game 1 ====
Team	1	2	3	4	5	6	7	8	9	R	H	E
Philadelphia	2	0	0	1	0	0	0	0	0	3	8	1
Tampa Bay	0	0	0	1	1	0	0	0	0	2	5	1
Starting pitchers: PHI: Cole Hamels; TB: Scott Kazmir; WP: Hamels (1–0) LP: Kazmir (0–1) Sv: Brad Lidge (1); Home runs: PHI: Chase Utley (1); TB: Carl Crawford (1)

Philadelphia scored the first runs of the series when Chase Utley hit a home run with Jayson Werth on base in the top of the first inning. Tampa Bay loaded the bases in the bottom of the third inning; however, Upton grounded into an inning-ending double play and the score remained 2–0. The Phillies extended their lead when Carlos Ruiz batted in Victorino in the fourth inning. A solo home run from Carl Crawford pulled the Rays back within two runs. Tampa Bay added their second run the following inning on an RBI double by Akinori Iwamura. Philadelphia starter Cole Hamels pitched seven innings and allowed only two runs, while Brad Lidge recorded his 47th consecutive save in 2008.

==== Game 2 ====
Team	1	2	3	4	5	6	7	8	9	R	H	E
Philadelphia	0	0	0	0	0	0	0	1	1	2	9	2
Tampa Bay	2	1	0	1	0	0	0	0	x	4	7	1
Starting pitchers: PHI: Brett Myers (0–0); TB: James Shields (0–0); WP: Shields (1–0) LP: Myers (0–1); Home runs: PHI: Eric Bruntlett (1); TB: none

Tampa starter James Shields shut down the Phillies lineup, scattering seven hits and allowing no runs in 5 2/3 innings of work. Outfielder B. J. Upton (2 for 4, one run scored, one RBI) and catcher Dioner Navarro (2 for 3, one run scored) led the offensive charge for the Rays as Brett Myers gave up four runs (three earned) while notching two strikeouts and three walks. Rather than power-hitting Matt Stairs, Charlie Manuel opted to go with Greg Dobbs as the DH; Dobbs was 1 for 3 for the Phillies, while Victorino and Howard supplied two hits each. Cliff Floyd extended the Rays' lead to four runs after leading off the bottom of the fourth inning with a single, advancing to third base, and scoring on a Jason Bartlett sacrifice bunt. The Phillies' loss tied the series at 1–1.

==== Game 3 ====
Team	1	2	3	4	5	6	7	8	9	R	H	E
Tampa Bay	0	1	0	0	0	0	2	1	0	4	6	1
Philadelphia	1	1	0	0	0	2	0	0	1	5	7	1
Starting pitchers: TB: Matt Garza; PHI: Jamie Moyer; WP: J. C. Romero (1–0) LP: J. P. Howell (0–1); Home runs: TB: none PHI: Carlos Ruiz (1), Utley (2), Ryan Howard (1)

After a 91-minute rain delay, the offenses fought back and forth, scoring run after run in an up-and-down affair in Philadelphia. Ryan Howard ended his home run drought, hitting his first round-tripper since the end of September. Chase Utley and Carlos Ruiz also hit home runs for the Phillies, while Carl Crawford and Dioner Navarro contributed a double each for the Rays. Philadelphia starter Jamie Moyer turned in his first strong performance of the postseason, allowing three runs over 6 1/3 innings. His counterpart Matt Garza allowed four runs over six innings, but neither would factor in the decision. After the Rays tied the game in the top of the eighth, the Phillies loaded the bases on two intentional walks with Eric Bruntlett on third base. Even with a five-man infield, Ruiz was still able to engineer some late-game heroics, sneaking a dribbling ground ball down the third base line to score Bruntlett. Philadelphia took a 2–1 series lead.

==== Game 4 ====
Team	1	2	3	4	5	6	7	8	9	R	H	E
Tampa Bay	0	0	0	1	1	0	0	0	0	2	5	2
Philadelphia	1	0	1	3	1	0	0	4	x	10	12	1
Starting pitchers: TB: Andy Sonnanstine (0–0); PHI: Joe Blanton (0–0); WP: Blanton (1–0) LP: Sonnanstine (0–1); Home runs: TB: Crawford (2), Eric Hinske (1); PHI: Howard 2 (3), Blanton (1), Jayson Werth (1)

The Phillies' offensive woes seemed in the distant past as the lineup broke out in a big way during Game 4. Led by Ryan Howard's 3-for-4, 2 home run performance, and home runs by Jayson Werth and starting pitcher Joe Blanton, the Phillies pushed 10 runs across the plate. Blanton became the first World Series pitcher to hit a home run in 34 years, in addition to a strong performance on the mound, pitching six innings and allowing two earned runs on four hits. Roster addition Eric Hinske hit a home run for the Rays, as did left fielder Carl Crawford, his second of the series.

==== Game 5 ====
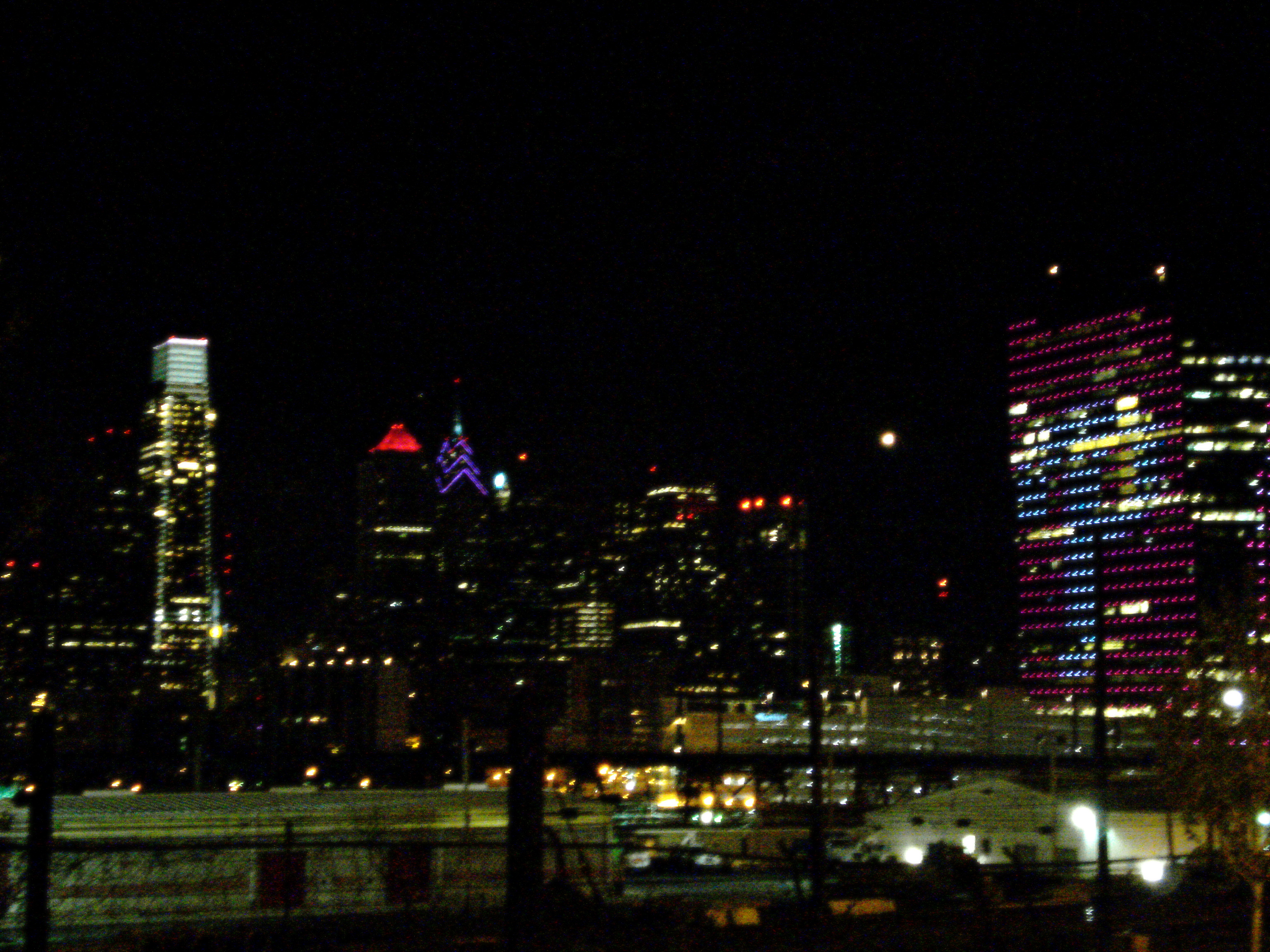
The Cira Centre in downtown Philadelphia was illuminated with the Phillies' "P" logo after their World Series victory.

Team	1	2	3	4	5	6	7	8	9	R	H	E
Tampa Bay	0	0	0	1	0	1	1	0	0	3	10	0
Philadelphia	2	0	0	0	0	1	1	0	x	4	8	1
Starting pitchers: TB: Kazmir (0–1); PHI: Hamels (1–0); WP: Romero (2–0) LP: Howell (0–2) Sv: Lidge (2); Home runs: TB: Rocco Baldelli (1); PHI: None

Philadelphia scored in the first inning for the third consecutive game, taking a 2–0 lead when Shane Victorino batted in Chase Utley and Jayson Werth. Tampa Bay cut the lead in half in the fourth inning; Carlos Peña doubled and was batted in on Evan Longoria's single, both players' first hits of the Series. The Rays then tied the game in the sixth inning when B. J. Upton scored from second base on a Peña single. The game was suspended after the top of the sixth inning due to rain, making it the first game in World Series history to not be played through to completion or declared a tie.

After the game was suspended, home plate umpire Tim Tschida told reporters that he and his crew ordered the players off the field because the wind and rain threatened to make the game "comical". Chase Utley agreed, saying that by the middle of the sixth inning, "the infield was basically underwater." Rain continued to fall in Philadelphia on Tuesday, further postponing the game to Wednesday.

Under normal conditions, games are considered to be official games after five innings, or four and a half if the home team is leading at that point. However, both Rays and Phillies management knew before the first pitch that Commissioner Bud Selig, who is responsible for the scheduling of post-season games, would not allow a team to clinch the Series by winning a rain-shortened game. Thus, the game resumed on October 29 in the middle of the sixth inning at Citizens Bank Park, with the Phillies batting in the bottom of the sixth inning. Pinch hitter Geoff Jenkins led off with a double and was bunted to third by Rollins. Batting third, Jayson Werth batted in Jenkins to give the Phillies the lead, 3–2. Rocco Baldelli re-tied the game at three runs with a solo home run in the top of the seventh inning, but Jason Bartlett was thrown out at home to end the inning on a fake throw-over by Utley, which went down as one of the greatest plays in World Series history. In the bottom of the seventh, Pat Burrell led off with a double; Eric Bruntlett entered as a pinch runner and scored on a hit by Pedro Feliz to put the Phillies up by a run again. Brad Lidge gave up a single and a stolen base but struck out Eric Hinske for the final out, sealing the Phillies' first World Series championship since the 1980 World Series, and the city's first major sports championship in 25 years.

=== Breaking the curse ===
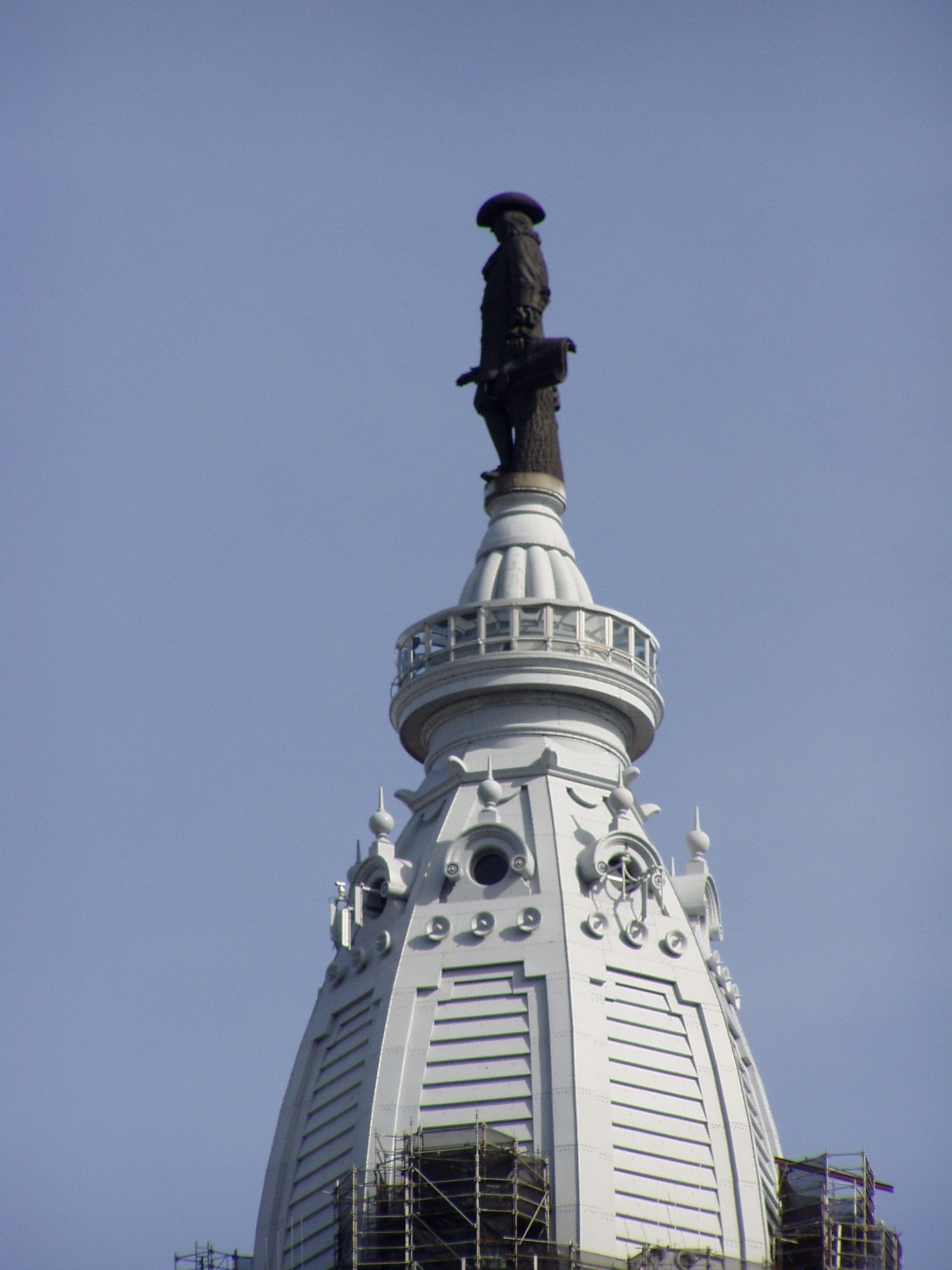
The statue of William Penn atop City Hall in downtown Philadelphia

The alleged curse of Billy Penn was sometimes used to explain the failure of professional sports teams based in Philadelphia to win championships. In March 1987, One Liberty Place, a 945-foot (288 m) tall skyscraper, opened three blocks from the 548 ft (167 m) high statue of William Penn atop Philadelphia City Hall. For many decades, a gentlemen's agreement stated that the Philadelphia Art Commission would approve no building in the city that would rise above this statue. The supposed curse had gained such prominence in Philadelphia that a documentary film entitled The Curse of William Penn was produced about it.

The curse ended on October 29, 2008, when the Phillies won the World Series, a year and four months after a statuette of the William Penn figure atop City Hall was affixed to the final beam put in place during the June 2007 topping-off of the Comcast Center, then the tallest building in the city.

== Awards ==
The 2008 team won the Commissioner's Trophy for its World Series title and the Warren C. Giles Trophy as National League champions. It was also named "Team of the Year" by the Philadelphia Sports Writers Association and received the Pride of Philadelphia Award from the Philadelphia Sports Hall of Fame. In 2009, the Philadelphia Sports Congress presented the team with the John Wanamaker Athletic Award. In May 2009, the team was recognized at the White House.

Starter Cole Hamels received the NLCS and World Series MVP awards. He also received the Babe Ruth Award from the New York chapter of the Baseball Writers' Association of America (BBWAA).

Closer Brad Lidge was named the Major League Baseball Comeback Player of the Year and the DHL Delivery Man of the Year for his perfect 48-for-48 performance throughout the 2008 regular season and postseason. He also received the Rolaids NL Relief Man Award, the Sporting News NL Reliever of the Year Award, the Philadelphia Sports Writers Association (PSWA) Outstanding Pro Athlete award, and the Daily News Sportsperson of the Year award.

Shortstop Jimmy Rollins and center fielder Shane Victorino were honored by Rawlings with Gold Gloves, honoring their defense in 2008. Rollins also received the Fielding Bible Award for shortstop. Rollins posted a fielding percentage of .988, compiling 193 putouts and 393 assists while making only seven errors; Victorino's fielding percentage was even higher, at .994, notching 7 assists from the outfield along with 328 putouts.

Clean-up hitter and first baseman Ryan Howard was named the recipient of the Babe Ruth Home Run Award (in MLB) and the Negro Baseball League Museum's Josh Gibson Legacy Award, as the NL leader in home runs. Howard hit 48 home runs in 2008, more than any other player in the National League. Howard also batted in 146 runs, and finished the regular season with 11 homers and 32 RBIs during September. Second baseman Chase Utley also won his third consecutive Silver Slugger Award, given annually to the best hitter in each league at his position.

Four of the This Year in Baseball Awards also went to the Phillies. Lidge was recognized as the Closer of the Year, while Utley won the Postseason Moment of the Year award for his fake throw to first base which allowed him to throw out Rays' shortstop Jason Bartlett at home plate during the World Series. Manager Charlie Manuel and general manager Pat Gillick were also named Manager of the Year (distinct from Major League Baseball's Manager of the Year award) and Executive of the Year, respectively, for their leadership of the 2008 team and for winning the World Series.

The Philadelphia chapter of the Baseball Writers' Association of America (BBWAA) presented its annual franchise awards to Brad Lidge ("Mike Schmidt Most Valuable Player Award"), Cole Hamels ("Steve Carlton Most Valuable Pitcher Award"), Jamie Moyer ("Dallas Green Special Achievement Award"), and Greg Dobbs ("Tug McGraw Good Guy Award").

Shane Victorino also received the Lou Gehrig Memorial Award for displaying character and integrity both on and off the field.

Pat Gillick also received the ceremonial title of King of Baseball from Minor League Baseball, in recognition of longtime dedication and service to professional baseball.

== Regular season player statistics ==
All statistics are current through the 2008 regular season.

=== Key ===
Statistic^{†}	Indicates team leader in this category among batters (player must qualify by MLB rules to lead a category)
Statistic^{§}	Indicates team leader in this category among starting pitchers (player must qualify by MLB rules to lead a category)
Statistic^{¶}	Indicates team leader in this category among relief pitchers (player must qualify by MLB rules to lead a category)
*	Indicates that two or more players tied for the lead in the category

=== Batting ===
Note: G = Games played; AB = At bats; R = Runs scored; H = Hits; 2B = Doubles; 3B = Triples; HR = Home runs; RBI = Runs batted in; AVG = Batting average; SB = Stolen bases

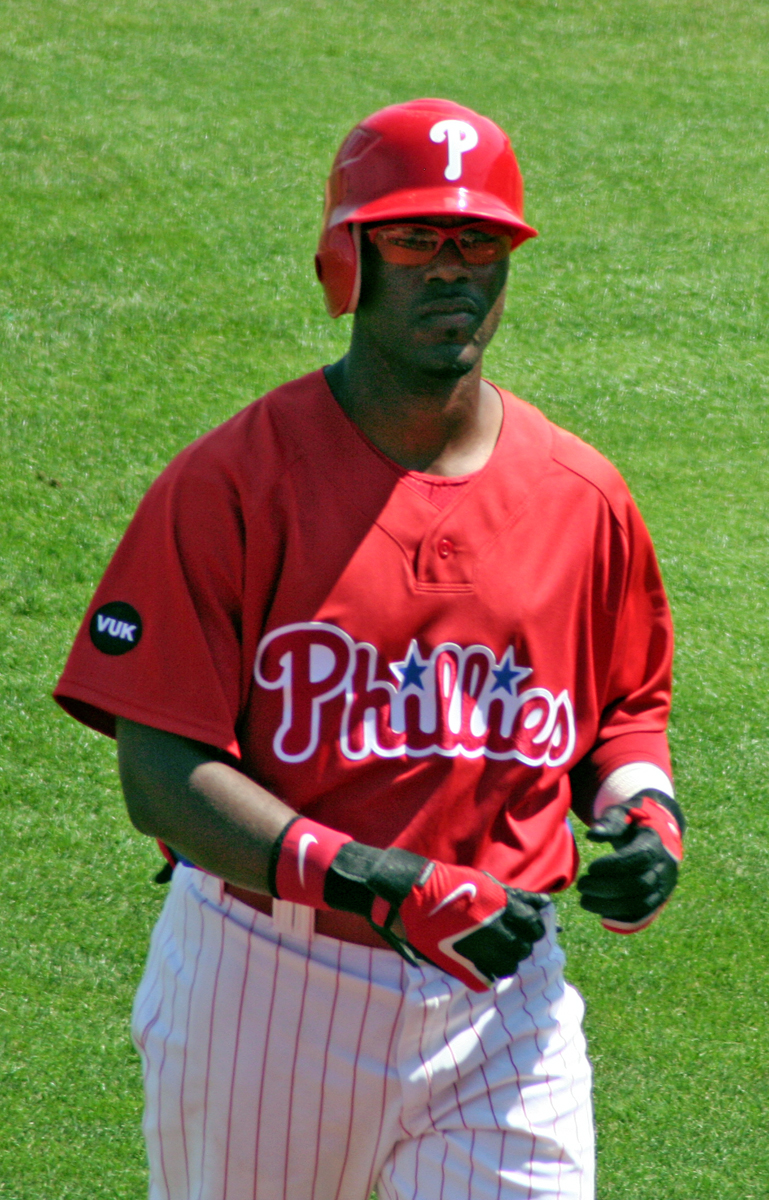
2007 National League MVP Jimmy Rollins

Player	G	AB	R	H	2B	3B	HR	RBI	AVG	SB
Joe Blanton	13	16	0	1	0	0	0	1	.063	0
T. J. Bohn	14	5	1	2	1	0	0	3	.400	0
Eric Bruntlett	120	212	37	46	9	1	2	15	.217	9
Pat Burrell	157	536	74	134	33	3	33	86	.250	0
Mike Cervenak	10	13	0	2	0	0	0	1	.154	0
Clay Condrey	55	3	1	1	1	0	0	0	.333	0
Chris Coste	98	274	28	72	17	0	9	36	.262	0
Greg Dobbs	128	226	30	68	14	1	9	40	.301	3
Chad Durbin	69	9	0	1	0	0	0	0	.111	0
Adam Eaton	22	28	1	5	2	0	0	1	.179	0
Pedro Feliz	133	425	43	106	19	2	14	58	.249	0
Greg Golson	6	6	2	0	0	0	0	0	.000	1
Cole Hamels	35	76	3	17	2	0	0	3	.224	0
J. A. Happ	8	7	0	0	0	0	0	0	.000	0
Brad Harman	6	10	1	1	1	0	0	1	.100	0
Ryan Howard	162^{†}	610^{†}	105	153	26	4	48^{†}	146^{†}	.251	1
Tadahito Iguchi	4	7	0	2	1	0	0	0	.286	0
Geoff Jenkins	115	293	27	72	16	0	9	29	.246	1
Kyle Kendrick	31	50	3	5	1	0	0	2	.100	0
Ryan Madson	73	2	0	0	0	0	0	0	.000	0
Lou Marson	1	4	2	2	0	1	2	2	.500	0
Jamie Moyer	31	51	4	4	1	0	0	1	.078	0
Brett Myers	30	58	3	4	1	0	0	1	.069	0
Jimmy Rollins	137	556	76	154	38	9^{†}	11	59	.277	47^{†}
Carlos Ruiz	117	320	47	70	14	0	4	31	.219	1
Chris Snelling	4	4	1	2	1	0	1	1	.500	0
Matt Stairs	16	17	4	5	1	0	2	5	.294	0
R. J. Swindle	3	2	0	0	0	0	0	1	.000	0
So Taguchi	88	91	18	20	5	1	0	9	.220	3
Andy Tracy	4	2	0	0	0	0	0	1	.000	0
Chase Utley	159	607	113^{†}	177^{†}	41^{†}	4	33	104	.292	14
Shane Victorino	146	570	102	167	30	8	14	58	.293^{†}	36
Les Walrond	6	1	0	0	0	0	0	0	.000	0
Jayson Werth	134	418	73	114	16	3	24	67	.273	20
Team Totals	162	5509	799	1407	291	36	214	762	.255	136

=== Pitching ===
Note: W = Wins; L = Losses; ERA = Earned run average; G = Games pitched; GS = Games started; SV = Saves; IP = Innings pitched; R = Runs allowed; ER = Earned runs allowed; BB = Walks allowed; K = Strikeouts

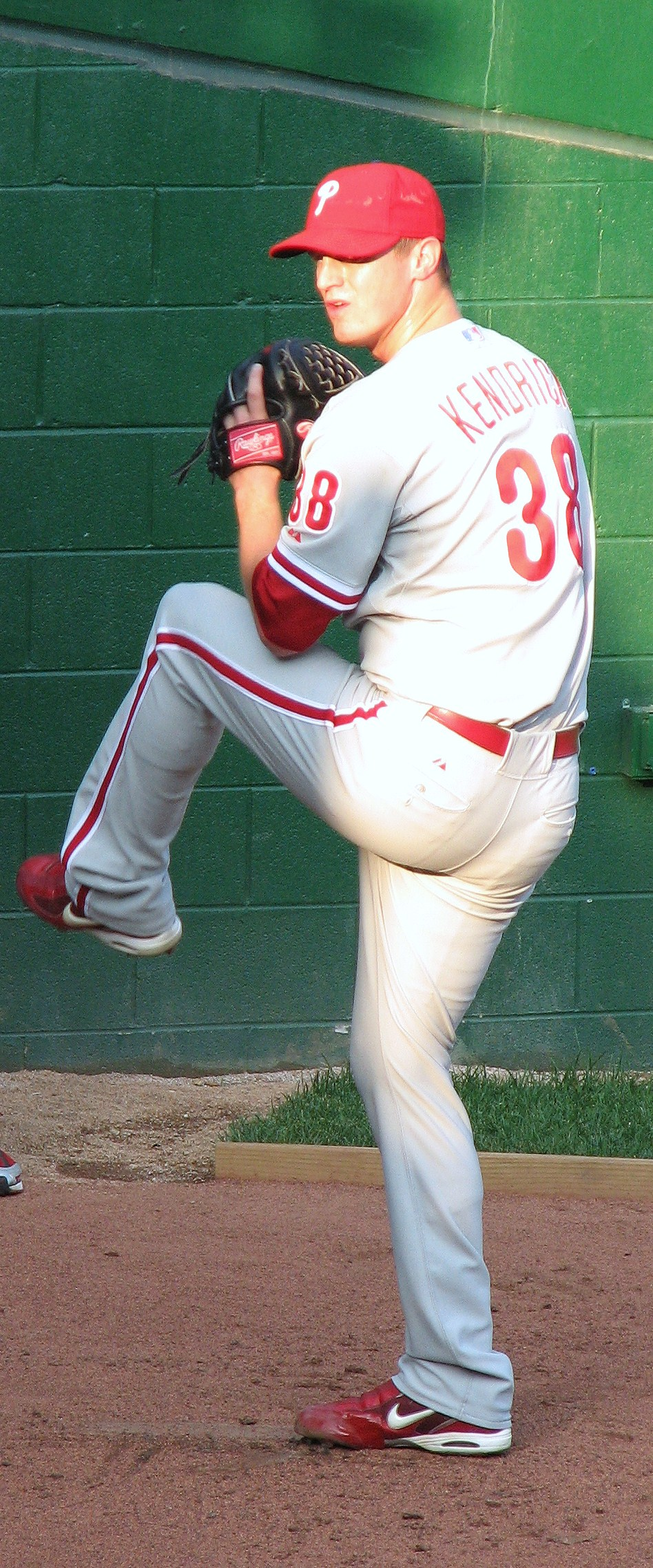
Starting pitcher Kyle Kendrick, 11–9 through his 30 starts in 2008

Player	W	L	ERA	G	GS	SV	IP	R	ER	BB	K
Joe Blanton	4	0	4.20	13	13	0	70 2/3	36	33	31	49
Andrew Carpenter	0	0	0.00	1	0	0	1	0	0	1	1
Clay Condrey	3	4*	3.26	52	0	1	69	26	25	19	34
Chad Durbin	5*	4*	2.87	71	0	1	87 2/3^{¶}	33^{¶}	28*	35	63
Adam Eaton	4	8	5.80	21	19	0	107	71	69	44	57
Scott Eyre	3	0	1.88	19	0	0	14 1/3	3	3	3	18
Tom Gordon	5*	4*	5.16	34	0	2	29⅔	19	17	17	26
Cole Hamels	14	10	3.09^{§}	33*	33*	0	227 1/3^{§}	89	78	53	196^{§}
J. A. Happ	1	0	3.69	8	4	0	31 2/3	24	17	14	26
Kyle Kendrick	11	9	5.49	30	30	0	155 2/3	103*	95	57	68
Brad Lidge	2	0	1.95^{¶}	72	0	41^{¶}	69 1/3	17	15	35	92^{¶}
Ryan Madson	4	2	3.05	76	0	1	70 2/3	29	28*	23	67
Jamie Moyer	16^{§}	7	3.71	33*	33*	0	196 1/3	85	81	62	123
Brett Myers	10	13^{§}	4.55	30	30	0	190	103*	96^{§}	65^{§}	163
J. C. Romero	4	4*	2.75	81^{¶}	0	1	59	18	18	38^{¶}	52
Rudy Seánez	5*	4*	3.53	42	0	0	43 1/3	24	17	25	30
R. J. Swindle	0	0	7.71	3	0	0	4 2/3	4	4	2	4
Les Walrond	1	1	6.10	6	0	0	10 1/3	7	7	9	12
Team Totals	92	70	3.89	162	162	47	1449 2/3	680	627	533	1081

== Footnotes ==
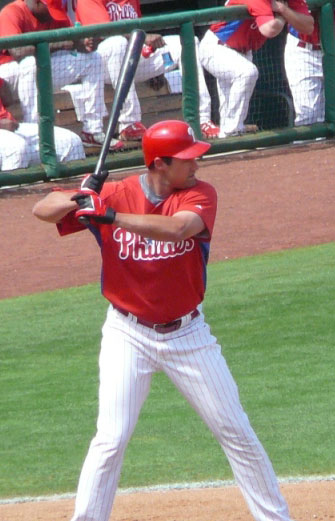
Pat Burrell hit the last of three consecutive home runs on June 13.

- ^{a} Jamie Moyer became the sixth pitcher in history to defeat every team in Major League Baseball with a 20–5 win over the Rockies. Also, the Phillies won back-to-back games by more than 10 runs for the third time in their history.
- ^{b} Chase Utley tied a franchise record by hitting a home run in his fifth straight game.
- ^{c} Utley, Ryan Howard, and Pat Burrell hit back-to-back-to-back home runs in the first inning. The Phillies' 20 runs were the most ever scored in a game at Busch Stadium III. The Phillies sent 15 batters to the plate in a nine-run fourth inning, and every Phillies starter, as well as pinch-hitter Eric Bruntlett, reached base at least once in the game, with only pinch-hitter Greg Dobbs being denied.
- ^{d} With a pinch-hit three-run home run in the fifth inning, Greg Dobbs tied a Phillies' franchise record with his twentieth pinch-hit of the season, tying Doc Miller. The home run turned out to be the game-winning RBI, as the Phillies overcame a nine-run Atlanta fourth inning with a seven-run fifth of their own.

== Farm system ==
Level	Team	League	Manager
AAA	Lehigh Valley IronPigs	International League	Dave Huppert
AA	Reading Phillies	Eastern League	P. J. Forbes
A	Clearwater Threshers	Florida State League	Razor Shines
A	Lakewood BlueClaws	South Atlantic League	Steve Roadcap
A-Short Season	Williamsport Crosscutters	New York–Penn League	Dusty Wathan
Rookie	GCL Phillies	Gulf Coast League	Roly de Armas

- League champion: GCL Phillies
