= R. J. Swindle =

Canadian baseball player (born 1983)

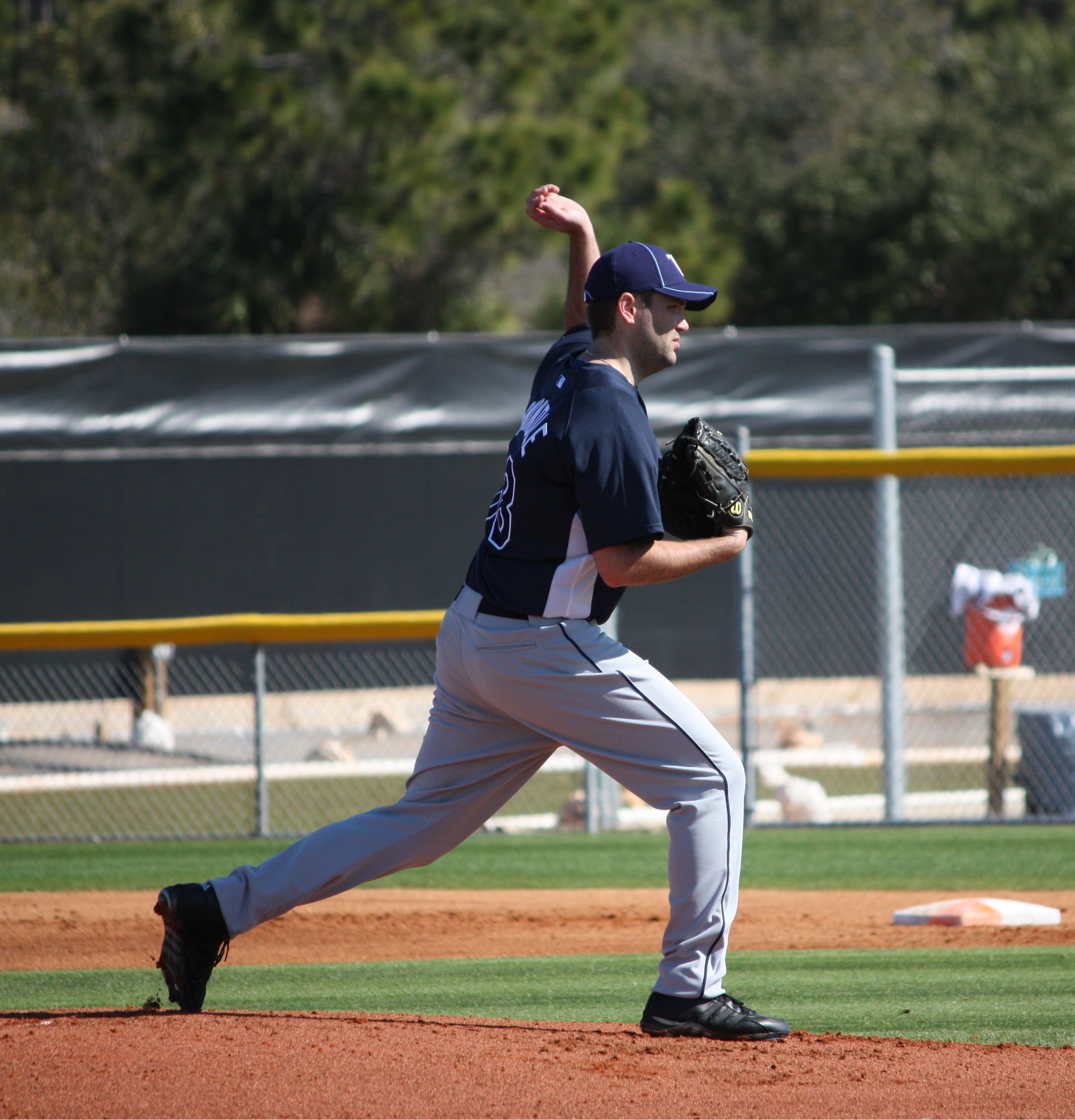
- Swindle with the Tampa Bay Rays
- Pitcher
- Born: July 7, 1983 (age 42); Vancouver, British Columbia, Canada
- Batted: Left Threw: Left

MLB debut
- July 7, 2008, for the Philadelphia Phillies

Last MLB appearance
- August 4, 2009, for the Milwaukee Brewers

MLB statistics
- Win–loss record: 0–0
- Earned run average: 12.71
- Strikeouts: 12
- Stats at Baseball Reference

Teams
- Philadelphia Phillies (2008); Milwaukee Brewers (2009)

Career highlights and awards
- World Series champion (2008)

Robert Joseph "R. J." Swindle (born July 7, 1983) is a Canadian former Major League Baseball (MLB) pitcher who played for the Philadelphia Phillies and Milwaukee Brewers in 2008 and 2009.

== Amateur career ==
A native of Vancouver, British Columbia, Swindle graduated from University High School in Orlando, Florida. He played travel ball for the Central Florida Renegades – leading them to the Connie Mack SE Regional Championship game before falling to East Cobb.

Swindle attended Charleston Southern University, where he was 21–13 over his three seasons playing for the Buccaneers. His strongest season was 2003, when he posted a 10–4 record as a starter with an ERA of 1.96. After the 2003 season, he played collegiate summer baseball with the Harwich Mariners of the Cape Cod Baseball League. Overall in his college career, he struck out 330 batters over three years, with a career ERA of 3.13.

== Professional career ==
=== 2004 ===
Swindle was selected by the Boston Red Sox in the 14th round (425th overall) of the 2004 MLB draft. He began his professional career as a reliever for the Lowell Spinners of the New York–Penn League. In 12 games, Swindle posted a 5–1 record with a 1.94 ERA, leading the Spinners in wins in 2004. He pitched 51 innings, allowing 11 earned runs and striking out 56, also leading the team in WHIP. Despite his statistics, he was released by the Red Sox at the end of the year.

=== 2005 ===
In 2005, Swindle played for the Schaumburg Flyers of the independent Northern League. Posting a 6–4 record in 18 games (16 starts), he was second on his team in innings pitched, with 118 1/3, and in strikeouts, with 102. Swindle also tossed two complete games for Schaumburg at the age of 21.

=== 2006–07 ===
Swindle started his 2006 season with the Flyers as a member of their starting rotation. After being signed by the New York Yankees organization in June, he posted an ERA of 0.61 in 21 appearances for Single-A Charleston, earning him a late-season promotion to Columbus. After beginning 2007 with the Newark Bears in the Atlantic League, he split the remainder of the year between Lakewood and Clearwater in the Phillies' farm system, compiling a 2–2 record with a 2.25 ERA in 44 innings pitched, including 57 strikeouts and only 8 walks.

=== 2008 ===
Swindle was first called up to the majors on July 2, 2008, to replace Clay Condrey in the Phillies' bullpen; he took the roster spot vacated by Brett Myers. As a reliever, he had a 1–1 record and a 2.19 ERA for Lehigh Valley, after posting a 1–0 record with an 0.54 ERA at Reading. Swindle was sent back down on July 4 to open a roster spot for J. A. Happ without playing in a major league game, but returned to the majors on July 7 when Tom Gordon went on the disabled list. He made his major league debut the same day, also his 25th birthday, against the New York Mets. He pitched three innings, allowing two runs, walking one and striking out three. Batting for himself against Arizona on July 12, Swindle drove in Eric Bruntlett on a fielders' choice for his first major league RBI in his second career at-bat. However, the Phillies optioned him back to Lehigh Valley the next day, July 13, in favor of Joe Bisenius. He was recalled to the majors when the Phillies made the postseason and got his first career championship ring when the Phillies prevailed in the 2008 World Series.

=== 2009 ===
Swindle signed with the Milwaukee Brewers on November 25, 2008, for the 2009 season.

On August 7, Swindle was designated for assignment by the Brewers, and was claimed by the Tampa Bay Rays. However, the Rays designated him for assignment the following day.

On August 12, 2009, Swindle was claimed off waivers by the Cleveland Indians.

=== 2011 ===
He signed with the Tampa Bay Rays for the 2011 season, before opting out of his contract on July 20.

=== 2012 ===
On December 21, 2011, he signed a minor league contract with the St. Louis Cardinals. He also received an invitation to spring training.
