= Brad Harman =

Australian baseball player (born 1985)

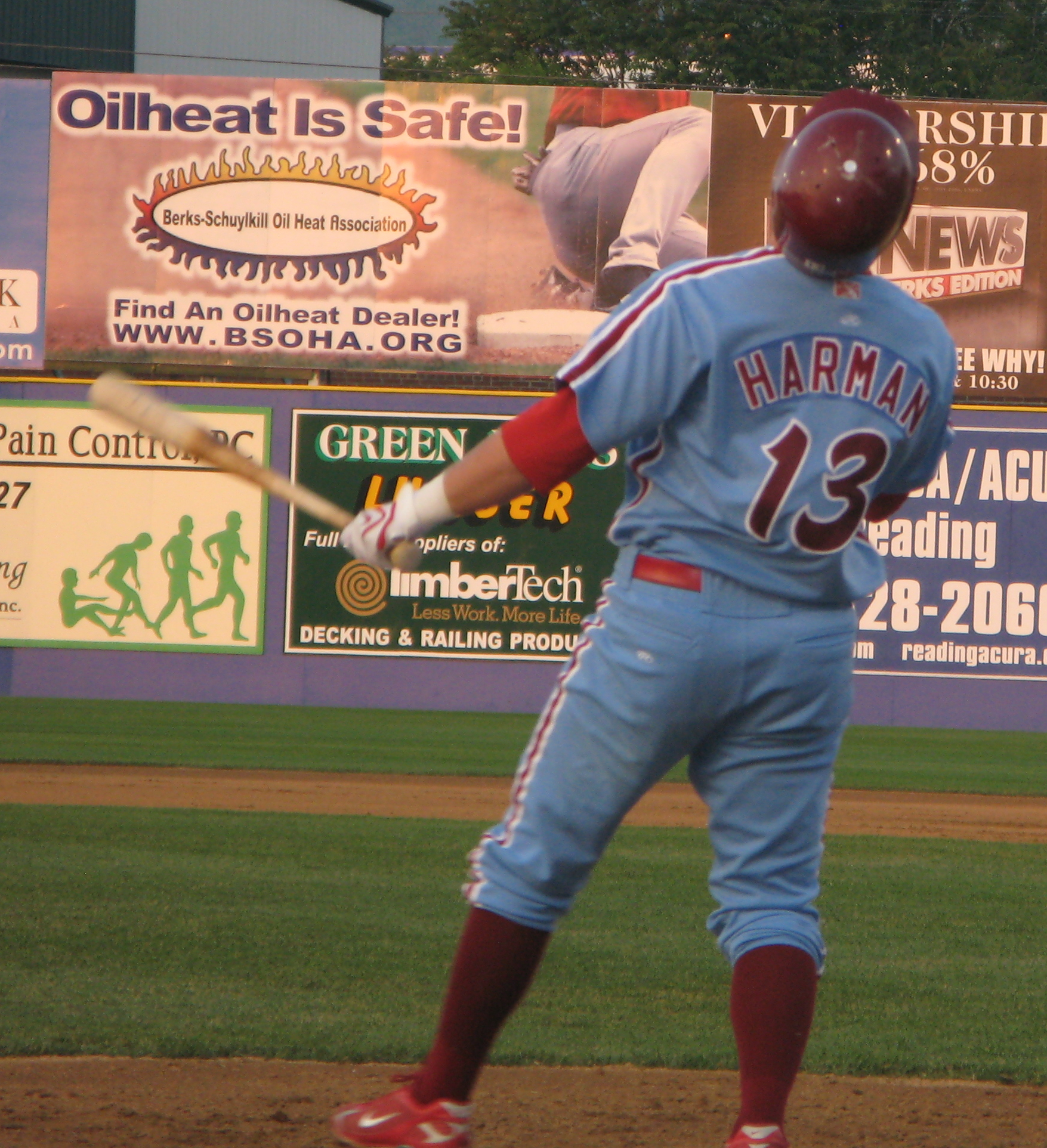
- Harman with the Reading Phillies in 2008

Free agent
- Second baseman
- Born: 19 November 1985 (age 40); Melbourne, Australia
- Batted: Right Threw: Right

MLB debut
- April 22, 2008, for the Philadelphia Phillies

Last MLB appearance
- May 8, 2008, for the Philadelphia Phillies

MLB statistics
- Batting average: .100
- Home runs: 0
- Runs batted in: 1
- Stats at Baseball Reference

Teams
- Philadelphia Phillies (2008)

Bradley Christopher Harman (born 19 November 1985) is an Australian former professional baseball second baseman. He previously played in Major League Baseball (MLB) for the Philadelphia Phillies.

== Professional career ==
Born Bradley Christopher Harman, he signed with the Phillies organisation in 2003 and debuted with the GCL Phillies the next year. At the end of the season, he led shortstops with a .928 fielding percentage. Later that year he played for the Australian under-19 national team.

Harman starred in the 2005 Claxton Shield, winning both the Gold Glove Award and Helms Award as the MVP of the tournament while leading the New South Wales Patriots to the title.

In 2005, Harman averaged .303 for the Lakewood BlueClaws. In his debut for the Australia national baseball team, he hit .333 in the 2005 Baseball World Cup, playing error-free ball in six games at shortstop; he split time at short with Rodney van Buizen in his debut tournament with the senior team.

In 2007, Harman hit .281 for Clearwater with 13 home runs. In the 2007 Baseball World Cup, he batted .275 and scored 11 runs in 10 games for Australia. He was one run behind the tournament leader, teammate Trent Oeltjen. Harman scored the 7th-inning go-ahead run against the Cuban national team in a game Australia lost, 3–2, in 10 innings. Harman sparked the winning rally in the bottom of the ninth inning against the Dutch national team closer Michiel van Kampen. Against Team Canada, Harman doubled in Luke Hughes with the go-ahead run in the 9th inning.

Right after the Cup ended, the Phillies added Harman to their 40-man roster. He started with the Reading Phillies in 2008 and, though he only hit .222, was called up to the majors on 20 April 2008 when Jimmy Rollins got injured. He debuted as a pinch-hitter on 22 April for Ryan Madson.

On 31 August 2009 Harman was designated for assignment by the Phillies. Four days later it was announced that he'd been selected for the Australian team at the 2009 Baseball World Cup.

On 20 May 2010, Herald Sun reported that Harman had been suspended for 14 months by the Australian Sports Anti-Doping Authority for failing to declare his whereabouts.

Due to his ASADA related suspension, Harman did not join his hometown Melbourne Aces in the Australian Baseball League until the 2011-12 season where he batted .305 and broke the single season home run record with 15 in 34 games.

Harman played his last professional baseball game 11 February 2017 with the Aces in the 2016-17 ABL Championship Series against the eventual champion Brisbane Bandits.
