= Australia national under-19 baseball team =

Australian AAA baseball team

Information
- Country: Australia
- Federation: Australian Baseball Federation
- Confederation: BCO
- Manager: Tony Harris

The Australian U-19 baseball team or National AAA represents Australia on a national level at baseball at an under-19-year-old age. The team has competed at the IBAF 'AAA' World Championships, and in the 2008 Canada Championship, the team finished 4th overall, losing to Cuba in the Bronze Medal match 6–2.

The team often competes above itself, finishing 2nd in 1994 and 2010 and 3rd in 1989.
