= Greg Dobbs =

American baseball player (born 1978)

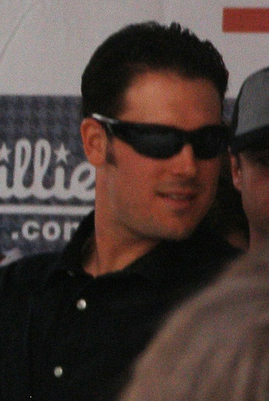
- Third baseman
- Born: July 2, 1978 (age 48); Los Angeles, California, U.S.
- Batted: Left Threw: Right

MLB debut
- September 8, 2004, for the Seattle Mariners

Last MLB appearance
- June 24, 2014, for the Washington Nationals

MLB statistics
- Batting average: .261
- Home runs: 46
- Runs batted in: 274
- Stats at Baseball Reference

Teams
- Seattle Mariners (2004–2006); Philadelphia Phillies (2007–2010); Florida / Miami Marlins (2011–2014); Washington Nationals (2014)

Career highlights and awards
- World Series champion (2008)

Gregory Stuart Dobbs (born July 2, 1978), is an American former professional baseball infielder, who played in Major League Baseball (MLB) for the Seattle Mariners, Philadelphia Phillies, Florida / Miami Marlins and Washington Nationals. Dobbs was primarily a third baseman and could also play the corner outfield positions and first base.

== Early career ==
Dobbs graduated from Canyon Springs High School (CA) in June 1996. He was drafted by the Seattle Mariners in the 52nd round of the 1996 Major League Baseball draft, but opted to attend Riverside (CA) Community College instead. While at the Long Beach State University in 1999, he was drafted in the 10th round of the 1999 Major League Baseball draft by the Houston Astros, but opted to stay in school. Dobbs led the Sooners as a senior in 2001 with a .438 average, 104 hits, 25 doubles, 62 RBIs and 12 steals, and graduated with a degree in sociology.

== Major leagues ==
=== Seattle Mariners ===
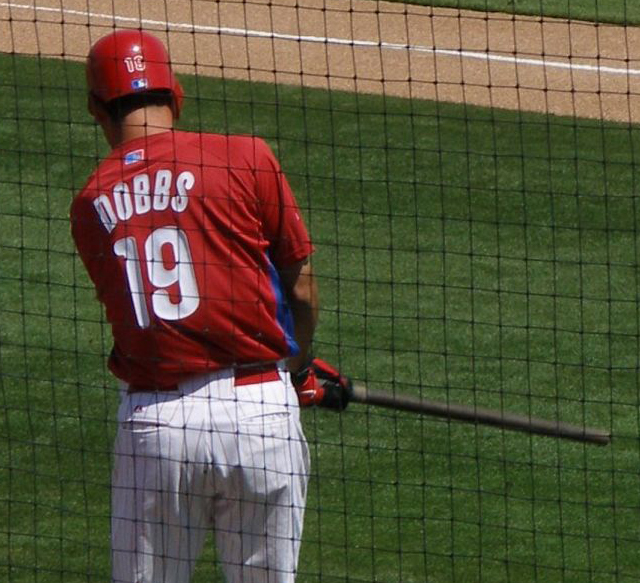
Greg Dobbs in 2007 spring training

Dobbs was signed by the Seattle Mariners as an amateur free agent on May 28, 2001.

=== Philadelphia Phillies ===
He was placed on waivers by the Mariners on January 15, 2007, and quickly claimed by former Mariners general manager (GM) Pat Gillick (then GM of the Philadelphia Phillies), who had previously drafted Dobbs while still with Seattle. After a strong 2007 spring training with the Phillies, Dobbs made the major league roster, platooning at third base with Wes Helms.

Dobbs' great hitting gave him more starts in 2007. He was mainly used as a pinch hitter in the beginning of the season, but his clutch pinch hits and good at-bats while starting got him more playing time with the Phillies.

Over 2007 and 2008, Dobbs led the majors in pinch-hit RBIs. In 2007, he finished in first place with 18 pinch-hit RBIs, the most in the major leagues. In 2008, his pinch-hitting prowess continued as he led the majors with 22 pinch hits and a .355 batting average while finishing second among pinch hitters with 16 RBIs.

Dobbs struggled to replicate his 2008 season in 2009, hitting just .247 with 5 home runs and 20 RBIs. In the 2010 season, Dobbs batted .152 before the Phillies designated him for assignment on June 22 to activate Jimmy Rollins from the disabled list. He cleared waivers and began to play for the Lehigh Valley IronPigs. After appearing in four games for Lehigh Valley, Dobbs was recalled to the major leagues, where he replaced Plácido Polanco, who was placed on the disabled list. On August 17, he was designated for assignment when the Phillies removed Chase Utley from the 15-day disabled list. On September 3 Dobbs was recalled from Lehigh Valley.

=== Florida/Miami Marlins ===
On January 31, 2011, Dobbs signed a minor league contract with the Florida Marlins with an invite to spring training. He made it in the 25-man roster for the 2011 season. He was designated for assignment on April 29, 2014. He was released on May 6.

=== Washington Nationals ===
On May 12, 2014, Dobbs signed a minor league contract with the Washington Nationals. His contract was selected on May 16, 2014, and he was added to the active roster.

== Personal life ==
Dobbs resides in La Cañada Flintridge, California, with his wife Heidi. He also has a daughter, Taylor, born December 20, 2006. He was pursuing a degree in business during the Major League Baseball offseason.

== See also ==
- Home run in first Major League at-bat
