= Clay Condrey =

American baseball player (born 1975)

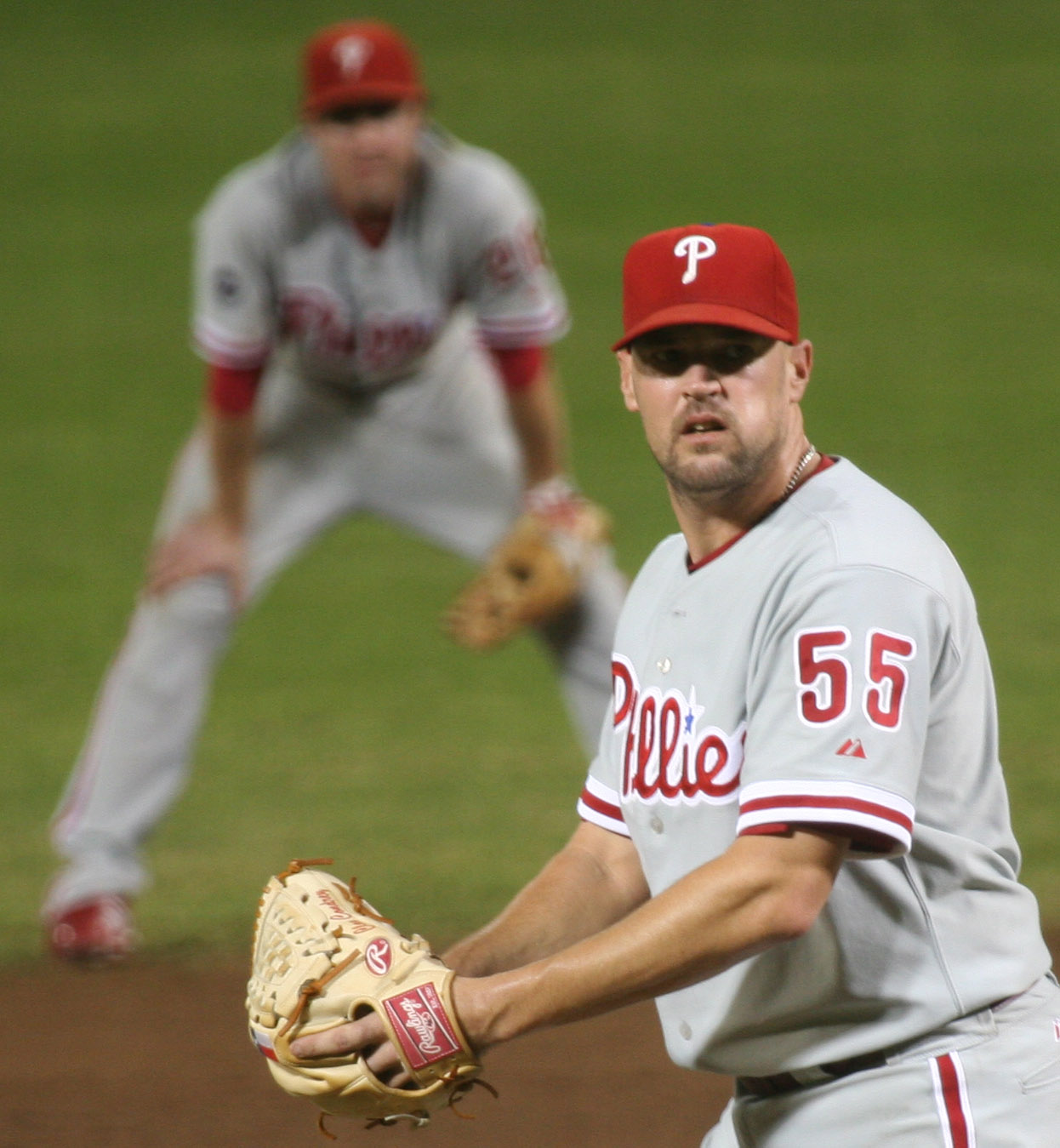
- Condrey with the Philadelphia Phillies
- Pitcher
- Born: November 19, 1975 (age 50); Beaumont, Texas, U.S.
- Batted: Right Threw: Right

MLB debut
- August 28, 2002, for the San Diego Padres

Last MLB appearance
- October 4, 2009, for the Philadelphia Phillies

MLB statistics
- Win–loss record: 18–12
- Earned run average: 4.10
- Strikeouts: 143
- Stats at Baseball Reference

Teams
- San Diego Padres (2002–2003); Philadelphia Phillies (2006–2009)

Career highlights and awards
- World Series champion (2008)

Clayton Lee Condrey (born November 19, 1975) is an American former professional baseball relief pitcher. He played in Major League Baseball (MLB) for the San Diego Padres and Philadelphia Phillies. Condrey featured five pitches: a sinker, cutter, curveball, changeup, and a four-seam fastball.

== Early life ==
The right-handed pitcher played at Navasota High School and McNeese State University. The New York Yankees selected Condrey in the 94th round, with selection No. 1,730 of the 1996 Major League Baseball draft out of Angelina (Texas) Junior College.

== Professional career ==
Condrey would eventually sign with the San Diego Padres in 1998. He was signed by then-Padres scout Theo Epstein.

Condrey pitched with the San Diego Padres in the 2002 and 2003 seasons before he moved to the Phillies in the offseason. In the Padres organization as a starter, Clay started 43 games between the Triple-A Portland Beavers and the major leagues, giving up 118 earned runs in 257.1 innings (ERA of 4.13).

Condrey pitched his entire 2004 season for the Triple-A Scranton/Wilkes-Barre Red Barons of the International League, where he led the team in starts and innings pitched (28 ST, 162 IP), compiling an ERA of 5.50. His 2005 campaign dropped slightly in appearances, where he appeared in only 24 starts (132.1 IP), but he subsequently lowered his ERA to 4.15. After being converted to relief, he was off to a strong start in 2006 as well, allowing only 3 earned runs in eight appearances, and was called up to the Phillies in May.

Condrey began the 2007 season on the Phillies' active roster, but on April 14, 2007, Condrey was designated for assignment by the Phillies to make room on the roster for starting pitcher Freddy García, who had been on the DL since the end of spring training. Condrey would be designated for assignment three other times, up until August 3, 2007, when he was recalled from Triple-A Ottawa for his fifth stint of the season with the Phillies. Condrey was included on the postseason roster for the National League East Champion Phillies in 2007 and appeared in Game 2 of the NLDS against the Colorado Rockies.

In 2008, Condrey made the Phillies' Opening Day squad and pitched well in middle-relief. In accordance with one of the oddities of the baseball rulebook, he earned a save in a 12–2 Phillies victory over the Nationals on May 21 by pitching three innings in relief of Jamie Moyer and not surrendering the lead, though he entered the game with the Phillies leading by twelve runs. Philadelphia won its second straight NL East title in 2008, and Condrey was again part of the postseason roster. He appeared in Game 3 of the NLDS against the Milwaukee Brewers and Game 3 of the NLCS against the Los Angeles Dodgers. Condrey would get a World Series ring as the Phillies defeated the Tampa Bay Rays in five games. Though still part of the active roster, Condrey did not appear in any World Series games.

Condrey went 6–2 with one save and a 3.00 ERA in 45 appearances for the Phillies in 2009, but was not included on the postseason roster as Philadelphia returned to the World Series before falling to the Yankees in six games. On December 12, 2009, Condrey was non-tendered by the Phillies and became a free agent.

On January 6, 2010, Condrey signed a one-year deal with the Minnesota Twins. but experienced some elbow discomfort at the beginning of the season and did not pitch after 2010.
