= 2009 San Francisco Giants season =

2009 San Francisco Giants
- League: National League
- Division: West
- Ballpark: AT&T Park
- City: San Francisco, California
- Record: 88–74 (.543)
- Divisional place: 3rd
- Owners: Bill Neukom (managing general partner)
- General managers: Brian Sabean
- Managers: Bruce Bochy
- Television: KNTV (NBC 11); CSN Bay Area (Duane Kuiper, Jon Miller, Mike Krukow)
- Radio: KNBR (680 AM) (Jon Miller, Greg Papa, Dave Flemming); KIQI (1010 AM, Spanish) (Erwin Higueros, Tito Fuentes)

The 2009 San Francisco Giants season was the Giants' 127th year in Major League Baseball, their 52nd year in San Francisco since their move from New York following the 1957 season, and their tenth at AT&T Park. After four consecutive losing seasons, the team finished in third place in the National League West with an 88–74 record, 7 games behind the Los Angeles Dodgers. Following Peter Magowan's retirement, Bill Neukom served as general managing partner of the Giants. After a season with the fewest home runs of any team since the 1993 Florida Marlins, general manager Brian Sabean said the Giants would attempt to bring in a power hitter as well as strengthening a bullpen that held a 4.45 ERA in 2008, 14th in the National League.

After leading the National League Wild Card race for most of the season, the Giants were ultimately passed by the Colorado Rockies. The team finished third in the NL West and second in the Wild Card. Though they missed the playoffs, the Giants surpassed most expectations for their season; for example, Sports Illustrated projected that the Giants would finish with a record of 77–85. Sports Illustrated's Lee Jenkins noted San Francisco's promising farm system (including products Pablo Sandoval and Madison Bumgarner) and the perceived weakness of the NL West as reasons to be optimistic about the Giants' potential. Additionally, the Giants' starting rotation boasted three Cy Young Award winners: Randy Johnson, Tim Lincecum, and Barry Zito. After the season ended, Lincecum won his second straight Cy Young. The Giants would build on their surprising 2009 season the following year, winning the World Series. It would be their first in San Francisco.

== Regular season ==
=== Notable events ===
- June 4 — Randy Johnson joins the 300 win club with a 5–1 victory over the Washington Nationals
- July 10 — Jonathan Sánchez throws a no-hitter against the San Diego Padres, the first by a Giant since September 29, 1976
- July 14 — Starting pitchers Tim Lincecum and Matt Cain are voted to the 2009 All-Star Game, with Lincecum being named the NL starting pitcher
- July 19 – Team majority owner Sue Burns dies of lung cancer
- July 27 — Giants trade pitching prospect Scott Barnes to the Cleveland Indians for first baseman Ryan Garko
- July 29 — Giants trade pitching prospect Tim Alderson to the Pittsburgh Pirates for second baseman Freddy Sanchez
- September 23 — Giants defeat the Arizona Diamondbacks 5–2, guaranteeing their first winning season since the 2004 campaign
- November 19 — Tim Lincecum wins his second consecutive Cy Young Award

=== Season standings ===
NL West
Team	W	L	Pct.	GB	Home	Road
Los Angeles Dodgers	95	67	.586	—	50‍–‍31	45‍–‍36
Colorado Rockies	92	70	.568	3	51‍–‍30	41‍–‍40
San Francisco Giants	88	74	.543	7	52‍–‍29	36‍–‍45
San Diego Padres	75	87	.463	20	42‍–‍39	33‍–‍48
Arizona Diamondbacks	70	92	.432	25	36‍–‍45	34‍–‍47

=== Record vs. opponents ===
2009 National League record Source: MLB Standings Grid – 2009
Team	AZ	ATL	CHC	CIN	COL	FLA	HOU	LAD	MIL	NYM	PHI	PIT	SD	SF	STL	WAS	AL
Arizona	–	3–4	4-2	1–5	7-11	5–3	5–4	7-11	2–5	5–2	1–5	6–1	11-7	5-13	2–4	1–5	5–10
Atlanta	4–3	–	4–2	3–6	4–4	8-10	3-3	4–3	3–3	13–5	10-8	3–4	3–3	3–4	4–2	10-8	7–8
Chicago	2-4	2–4	–	10-5	2–4	4–3	11–6	3–5	10-7	3-3	1–5	10-4	4–5	4-2	6-10	5–2	6–9
Cincinnati	5-1	6-3	5-10	–	0-7	3-3	12-4	1-5	8-7	2-4	2-5	13-5	1-6	3-3	8-8	3-4	6-9
Colorado	11-7	4-4	4-2	7-0	–	2-4	2-5	4-14	6-0	3-4	2-4	6-3	10-8	8-10	6-1	6-0	11-4
Florida	3-5	10-8	3-4	3-3	4-2	–	4–3	3-3	3-4	11-7	9-9	2-4	4-2	3-4	3-3	12-6	10-8
Houston	4–5	3-3	6-11	4-12	5-2	3-4	–	4–3	5-10	1-5	6-2	10-5	6-1	2-4	6-9	3-3	6-9
Los Angeles	11-7	3-4	5-3	5-1	14-4	3-3	3-4	–	3–3	5-1	4-3	4-3	10-8	11-7	2-5	3-2	9-9
Milwaukee	5-2	3-3	7-10	7-8	0-6	4-3	10-5	3-3	–	3-3	4-3	9-5	2-4	4-5	9-9	5-3	5-10
New York	2-5	5-13	3-3	4-2	4-3	7-11	5-1	1-5	3-3	–	6-12	4-3	2-5	5-3	4-5	10-8	5–10
Philadelphia	5-1	8-10	5-1	5-2	4-2	9-9	2-6	3-4	3-4	12-6	–	4-2	5-2	3-4	4-1	15-3	6-12
Pittsburgh	1-6	4-3	4-10	5-13	3-6	4-2	5-10	3-4	5-9	3-4	2-4	–	3-4	2-4	5-10	5-3	8–7
San Diego	7-11	3-3	5-4	6-1	8-10	2-4	1-6	8-10	4-2	5-2	2-5	4-3	–	10-8	1-6	4-2	5–10
San Francisco	13-5	4–3	2–4	3–3	10-8	4–3	4–2	7-11	5-4	3–5	4–3	4–2	8-10	–	4–3	4–2	9–6
St. Louis	4-2	2-4	10-6	8-8	1-6	3-3	9-6	5-2	9-9	5-4	1-4	10-5	6-1	3-4	–	6–1	9–6
Washington	5-1	8-10	2-5	4-3	0-6	6-12	3-3	2-3	3-5	8-10	3-15	3-5	2-4	2-4	1-6	–	7–11

=== Game log ===
Legend
Giants Win	Giants Loss	Postponed

Game Log
April (10–10)

#	Date	Opponent	Score	Win	Loss	Save	Attendance	Record
1	April 7	Brewers	10–6	Martinez (1–0)	Suppan (0–1)		42,767	1–0
2	April 8	Brewers	4–2	Gallardo (1–0)	Johnson (0–1)	Villanueva (1)	40,764	1–1
3	April 9	Brewers	7–1	Cain (1–0)	Parra (0–1)		30,027	2–1
4	April 10	@ Padres	7–3	Hill (1–0)	Zito (0–1)		20,507	2–2
5	April 11	@ Padres	6–3	Peavy (1–1)	Sánchez (0–1)	Bell (3)	35,305	2–3
6	April 12	@ Padres	6–1	Young (2–0)	Lincecum (0–1)		19,415	2–4
7	April 13	@ Dodgers	11–1	Billingsley (2–0)	Johnson (0–2)		57,099	2–5
8	April 15	@ Dodgers	5–4	Broxton (1–0)	Howry (0–1)		42,511	2–6
9	April 16	@ Dodgers	7–2	Stults (2–0)	Zito (0–2)		36,553	2–7
10	April 17	Diamondbacks	2–0	Sánchez (1–1)	Haren (0–3)	Wilson (1)	34,898	3–7
11	April 18	Diamondbacks	2–0	Davis (1–2)	Affeldt (0–1)	Qualls	37,409	3–8
12	April 19	Diamondbacks	2–0	Johnson (1–2)	Scherzer (0–1)	Wilson (2)	35,350	4–8
13	April 21	Padres	8–3	Cain (2–0)	Peavy (2–2)		39,314	5–8
14	April 22	Padres	1–0 (10)	Wilson (1–0)	Moreno (0–2)		26,593	6–8
15	April 24	@ Diamondbacks	5–1	Lincecum (1–1)	Davis (1–3)		27,865	7–8
16	April 25	@ Diamondbacks	5–3	Miller (1–0)	Scherzer (0–2)	Wilson (3)	37,253	8–8
17	April 26	@ Diamondbacks	5–4 (12)	Gutiérrez (1–1)	Medders (0–1)		31,862	8–9
18	April 27	Dodgers	5–4	Valdéz (1–0)	Belisario (0–2)	Wilson (4)	30,091	9–9
19	April 28	Dodgers	5–3	Broxton (2–0)	Howry (0–2)	Ohman (1)	30,482	9–10
20	April 29	Dodgers	9–4	Lincecum (2–1)	Stults (2–1)	Wilson (5)	37,717	10–10

May (15–14)

#	Date	Opponent	Score	Win	Loss	Save	Attendance	Record
21	May 1	Rockies	3–2	Johnson (2–2)	Jiménez (1–4)	Wilson (6)	30,791	11–10
22	May 2	Rockies	5–1	Marquis (4–1)	Cain (2–1)		30,166	11–11
23	May 3	Rockies	1–0 (10)	Medders (1–1)	Corpas (0–3)		30,650	12–11
24	May 4	@ Cubs	4–2	Dempster (2–1)	Sánchez (1–2)	Gregg (4)	39,112	12–12
25	May 5	@ Cubs	6–2	Lincecum (3–1)	Marshall (0–2)		39,497	13–12
26	May 6	@ Rockies	11–1	Jiménez (2–4)	Johnson (2–3)		22,105	13–13
27	May 7	@ Rockies	8–3	Cain (3–1)	Marquis (4–2)		23,453	14–13
28	May 8	@ Dodgers	3–1	Zito (1–2)	Billingsley (5–1)	Wilson (7)	51,209	15–13
29	May 9	@ Dodgers	8–0	Stults (4–1)	Sánchez (1–3)		41,425	15–14
30	May 10	@ Dodgers	7–5 (13)	Wilson (2–0)	Mota (2–1)		37,529	16–14
31	May 11	Nationals	11–7	Johnson (3–3)	Cabrera (0–4)	Wilson (8)	23,934	17–14
32	May 12	Nationals	9–7	Medders (2–1)	Beimel (0–2)		25,701	18–14
33	May 13	Nationals	6–3	Martis (5–0)	Zito (1–3)	Wells (2)	30,120	18–15
34	May 14	Mets	7–4	Parnell (2–0)	Wilson (2–1)	Rodríguez (10)	30,154	18–16
35	May 15	Mets	8–6	Stokes (1–1)	Wilson (2–2)	Rodríguez (11)	41,684	18–17
36	May 16	Mets	9–6	Santana (5–2)	Johnson (3–4)	Putz (1)	41,366	18–18
37	May 17	Mets	2–0	Cain (4–1)	Pelfrey (4–1)	Wilson (9)	43,012	19–18
38	May 19	@ Padres	2–1	Young (3–2)	Zito (1–4)	Bell (10)	16,175	19–19
39	May 20	@ Padres	2–1	Gaudin (1–3)	Sánchez (1–4)	Bell (11)	15,208	19–20
40	May 21	@ Padres	3–2	Bell (2–0)	Wilson (2–3)		19,921	19–21
41	May 22	@ Mariners	2–1 (12)	White (1–0)	Miller (1–1)		38,520	19–22
42	May 23	@ Mariners	5–1	Cain (5–1)	Lowe (0–2)		33,348	20–22
43	May 24	@ Mariners	5–4	Hernández (5–3)	Zito (1–5)	Aardsma (6)	36,616	20–23
44	May 25	Braves	8–2	Sánchez (2–4)	Vázquez (4–4)		40,034	21–23
45	May 26	Braves	4–0	Lincecum (4–1)	Medlen (0–2)		29,485	22–23
46	May 27	Braves	6–3	Johnson (4–4)	Kawakami (3–6)	Wilson (10)	27,744	23–23
47	May 29	Cardinals	4–2	Cain (6–1)	Piñeiro (5–5)	Wilson (11)	35,266	24–23
48	May 30	Cardinals	6–2	Carpenter (3–0)	Zito (1–6)		35,592	24–24
49	May 31	Cardinals	5–3	Valdéz (2–0)	Wainwright (5–3)	Wilson (12)	41,440	25–24

June (17–10)

#	Date	Opponent	Score	Win	Loss	Save	Attendance	Record
50	June 2	@ Nationals	10–6	Villone (3–0)	Howry (0–3)		17,331	25–25
–	June 3	@ Nationals	Postponed (rain) Rescheduled for June 4					
51	June 4	@ Nationals	5–1	Johnson (5–4)	Zimmermann (2–3)	Wilson (13)		26–25
52	June 4	@ Nationals	4–1 (6)	Cain (7–1)	Detwiler (0–2)		16,787	27–25
53	June 5	@ Marlins	2–1	Zito (2–6)	Volstad (4–5)	Wilson (14)	12,841	28–25
54	June 6	@ Marlins	5–4	Miller (2–2)	Sánchez (2–5)	Núñez (2)	16,294	28–26
55	June 7	@ Marlins	3–2	Lincecum (5–1)	Nolasco (2–6)	Wilson (15)	11,505	29–26
56	June 8	@ Marlins	4–0	West (1–1)	Johnson (5–5)		12,068	29–27
57	June 9	@ Diamondbacks	9–4	Cain (8–1)	Buckner (2–2)		22,428	30–27
58	June 10	@ Diamondbacks	6–4	Zito (3–6)	Davis (3–7)	Wilson (16)	19,837	31–27
59	June 11	@ Diamondbacks	2–1	Scherzer (3–4)	Sánchez (2–6)	Qualls (13)	24,389	31–28
60	June 12	Athletics	3–0	Lincecum (6–1)	Mazzaro (2–1)		36,035	32–28
61	June 13	Athletics	5–2	Johnson (6–5)	Outman (4–1)	Wilson (17)	37,874	33–28
62	June 14	Athletics	7–1	Cain (9–1)	Anderson (3–7)		37,728	34–28
63	June 15	Angels	9–7	Lackey (2–2)	Zito (3–7)	Fuentes (17)	33,613	34–29
64	June 16	Angels	8–1	O'Sullivan (1–0)	Sánchez (2–7)		34,716	34–30
65	June 17	Angels	4–3	Jepsen (1–2)	Lincecum (6–2)	Fuentes (18)	37,431	34–31
66	June 19	Rangers	6–4	Romo (1–0)	Feldman (5–2)	Wilson (18)	31,241	35–31
67	June 20	Rangers	2–1 (11)	Romo (2–0)	Jennings (2–3)		33,312	36–31
68	June 21	Rangers	3–2	Zito (4–7)	Millwood (7–5)	Wilson (19)	41,292	37–31
69	June 22	@ Athletics	5–1	Cahill (5–5)	Sánchez (2–8)	Ziegler (6)	27,324	37–32
70	June 23	@ Athletics	4–1	Lincecum (7–2)	Mazzaro (2–2)		32,854	38–32
71	June 24	@ Athletics	6–3	Johnson (7–5)	Gonzalez (0–1)	Wilson (20)	35,067	39–32
72	June 26	@ Brewers	5–1	Gallardo (8–4)	Cain (9–2)		37,345	39–33
73	June 27	@ Brewers	7–6	Hoffman (1–1)	Wilson (2–4)		42,065	39–34
74	June 28	@ Brewers	7–0	Sadowski (1–0)	Suppan (5–6)		43,391	40–34
75	June 29	@ Cardinals	10–0	Lincecum (8–2)	Thompson (2–4)		37,737	41–34
76	June 30	@ Cardinals	6–3	Johnson (8–5)	Carpenter (5–3)	Wilson (21)	37,174	42–34

July (14–13)

#	Date	Opponent	Score	Win	Loss	Save	Attendance	Record
77	July 1	@ Cardinals	2–1 (10)	Franklin (2–0)	Howry (0–4)		36,928	42–35
78	July 2	@ Cardinals	5–2	Wellemeyer (7–7)	Zito (4–8)	Franklin (19)	41,875	42–36
79	July 3	Astros	13–0	Sadowski (2–0)	Paulino (2–5)		42,199	43–36
80	July 4	Astros	9–0	Lincecum (9–2)	Ortiz (3–4)		34,582	44–36
81	July 5	Astros	7–1	Oswalt (5–4)	Johnson (8–6)		30,157	44–37
82	July 6	Marlins	5–4	Cain (10–2)	West (3–3)	Wilson (22)	26,995	45–37
83	July 7	Marlins	3–0	Zito (5–8)	Johnson (7–2)	Romo (1)	27,799	46–37
84	July 8	Marlins	7–0	Volstad (6–8)	Sadowski (2–1)		34,157	36–38
85	July 9	Padres	9–3	Lincecum (10–2)	Geer (1–4)		33,508	47–38
86	July 10	Padres	8–0	Sánchez (3–8)	Banks (1–1)		30,298	48–38
87	July 11	Padres	2–1	Miller (2–1)	Stauffer (0–1)	Wilson (23)	38,112	49–38
88	July 12	Padres	10–4	Correia (6–7)	Zito (5–9)		41,913	49–39
89	July 17	@ Pirates	2–1 (14)	Meek (1–0)	Howry (0–5)		26,709	49–40
90	July 18	@ Pirates	2–0	Morton (2–2)	Zito (5–10)	Capps (20)	37,023	49–41
91	July 19	@ Pirates	4–3	Cain (11–2)	Duke (8–9)	Wilson (24)	24,842	50–41
92	July 20	@ Braves	11–3	Hanson (5–0)	Romo (2–1)		21,988	50–42
93	July 21	@ Braves	8–1	Lowe (9–7)	Sadowki (2–2)		25,135	50–43
94	July 22	@ Braves	4–2	Jurrjens (9–7)	Lincecum (10–3)	Soriano (14)	34,672	50–44
95	July 23	@ Braves	5–1	Zito (6–10)	Gonzalez (3–3)		31,727	51–44
96	July 24	@ Rockies	3–1	Cain (12–2)	Hammel (5–5)	Wilson (25)	40,524	52–44
97	July 25	@ Rockies	8–2	de la Rosa (8–7)	Sánchez		42,201	52–45
98	July 26	@ Rockies	4–2	Cook (10–3)	Sadowski (2–3)	Street (25)	40,723	52–46
99	July 27	Pirates	4–2	Lincecum (11–3)	Maholm (6–5)		40,008	53–46
100	July 28	Pirates	3–2	Romo (3–1)	Morton (2–3)	Wilson (26)	35,972	54–46
101	July 29	Pirates	1–0 (10)	Wilson (3–4)	Capps (2–6)		37,582	55–46
102	July 30	Phillies	7–2	Sánchez (4–9)	López (3–1)		36,603	56–46
103	July 31	Phillies	5–1	Lee (8–9)	Sadowski (2–4)		33,934	56–47

August (16–12)

#	Date	Opponent	Score	Win	Loss	Save	Attendance	Record
104	August 1	Phillies	2–0	Lincecum (12–3)	Blanton (7–5)	Wilson (27)	42,694	57–47
105	August 2	Phillies	7–3	Zito (7–10)	Hamels (7–6)		42,744	58–47
106	August 3	@ Astros	4–3	Hampton (7–8)	Cain (12–3)	Valverde (13)	29,835	58–48
107	August 4	@ Astros	8–1	Sánchez (5–9)	Paulino (2–6)		29,747	59–48
108	August 5	@ Astros	10–6	Martinez (2–0)	Moehler (7–7)		31,710	60–48
109	August 7	Reds	10–5	Weathers (3–3)	Wilson (3–5)		41,744	60–49
110	August 8	Reds	4–2	Zito (8–10)	Arroyo (10–11)	Wilson (28)	37,057	61–49
111	August 9	Reds	5–2	Harang (6–13)	Cain (12–4)	Cordero (24)	36,705	61–50
112	August 10	Dodgers	4–2	Kuroda (5–5)	Sánchez (5–10)	Broxton (25)	40,522	61–51
113	August 11	Dodgers	9–1	Wolf (6–6)	Martinez (2–1)		41,167	61–52
114	August 12	Dodgers	4–2 (10)	Wilson (4–5)	Mota (4–5)		43,300	62–52
115	August 14	@ Mets	3–0	Parnell (3–4)	Zito (8–11)	Rodríguez (26)	38,997	62–53
116	August 15	@ Mets	5–4 (10)	Wilson (5–5)	Rodríguez (2–4)		39,652	63–53
117	August 16	@ Mets	3–2	Rodríguez (3–4)	Romo (3–2)		38,793	63–54
118	August 17	@ Mets	10–1	Martinez (3–1)	Hernández (7–8)		38,584	64–54
119	August 18	@ Reds	8–5 (10)	Howry (1–5)	Cordero (1–3)	Wilson (29)	13,334	65–54
120	August 19	@ Reds	1–0	Romo (4–2)	Arroyo (11–12)	Wilson (30)	11,302	66–54
121	August 20	@ Reds	2–1 (10)	Cordero (2–3)	Howry (1–6)		13,390	66–55
122	August 21	@ Rockies	6–3	Sánchez (6–10)	Cook (10–6)		43,666	67–55
123	August 22	@ Rockies	14–11	de la Rosa (12–8)	Miller (2–2)		47,178	67–56
124	August 23	@ Rockies	4–2	Jiménez (12–9)	Lincecum (12–4)	Street (33)	48,704	67–57
125	August 24	@ Rockies	6–4 (14)	Eaton (3–5)	Miller (2–3)		27,670	67–58
126	August 25	Diamondbacks	5–4	Affeldt (1–1)	Rauch (2–2)	Romo (2)	37,492	68–58
127	August 26	Diamondbacks	4–3	Miller (3–3)	Qualls (2–2)	Medders (1)	27,645	69–58
128	August 27	Diamondbacks	11–0	Petit (3–8)	Martinez (3–2)		28,575	69–59
129	August 28	Rockies	2–0	Lincecum (13–4)	Jiménez (12–10)	Wilson (31)	39,047	70–59
130	August 29	Rockies	5–3	Zito (9–11)	Marquis (14–9)	Wilson (32)	41,200	71–59
131	August 30	Rockies	9–5	Medders (3–1)	Betancourt (1–3)		42,571	72–59

September (13–13)

#	Date	Opponent	Score	Win	Loss	Save	Attendance	Record
132	September 1	@ Phillies	1–0	Hamels (8–8)	Sánchez (6–11)		44,679	72–60
133	September 2	@ Phillies	4–0	Penny (8–8)	Happ (10–4)		45,086	73–60
134	September 3	@ Phillies	2–1	Martínez (3–0)	Lincecum (13–5)	Lidge (28)	45,156	73–61
135	September 4	@ Brewers	3–2	Medders (4–1)	Coffey (4–4)	Wilson (33)	37,511	74–61
136	September 5	@ Brewers	3–2	Cain (13–4)	Gallardo (12–11)	Wilson (34)	30,254	75–61
137	September 6	@ Brewers	2–1 (12)	Stetter (4–1)	Valdez (2–1)		36,590	75–62
138	September 7	Padres	9–4	Penny (9–8)	Richard (8–5)		37,132	76–62
139	September 8	Padres	4–3	Gregerson (1–3)	Affeldt (1–2)	Bell (36)	34,524	76–63
140	September 9	Padres	4–2	LeBlanc (2–1)	Zito (9–12)	Bell (37)	30,312	76–64
141	September 11	Dodgers	10–3	Kuroda (6–6)	Cain (13–5)		39,212	76–65
142	September 12	Dodgers	9–1	Padilla (11–6)	Sánchez (6–12)		41,710	76–66
143	September 13	Dodgers	7–2	Penny (10–8)	Billingsley (12–10)		40,579	77–66
144	September 14	Rockies	9–1	Lincecum (14–5)	Hammel (8–8)		31,307	78–66
145	September 15	Rockies	10–2	Zito (10–12)	Jiménez (13–11)		30,353	79–66
146	September 16	Rockies	4–3	de la Rosa (15–9)	Cain (13–6)	Betancourt (2)	38,696	79–67
147	September 18	@ Dodgers	8–4	Howry (2–4)	Troncoso (4–4)		53,679	80–67
148	September 19	@ Dodgers	12–1	Garland (11–11)	Penny (10–9)		52,438	80–68
149	September 20	@ Dodgers	6–2	Wolf (11–6)	Lincecum (14–6)		53,233	80–69
150	September 21	@ Diamondbacks	5–4	Romo (5–2)	Vásquez (3–3)	Wilson (35)	25,485	81–69
151	September 22	@ Diamondbacks	10–8	Davis (8–13)	Cain (13–7)		25,591	81–70
152	September 23	@ Diamondbacks	5–2	Sánchez (7–12)	Mulvey (0–2)	Wilson (36)	25,851	82–70
153	September 24	Cubs	3–2	Heilman (4–4)	Wilson (5–6)	Mármol (15)	31,603	82–71
154	September 25	Cubs	3–0	Zambrano (9–6)	Lincecum (14–7)		33,970	82–72
155	September 26	Cubs	6–2	Gorzelanny (7–2)	Zito (10–13)		35,885	82–73
156	September 27	Cubs	5–1	Cain (14–7)	Wells (11–10)	Wilson (37)	38,330	83–73
157	September 29	Diamondbacks	8–4	Sánchez (8–12)	Davis (8–14)		28,039	84–73
158	September 30	Diamondbacks	4–1	Penny (11–9)	Mulvey (0–3)		29,473	85–73

October (3–1)

#	Date	Opponent	Score	Win	Loss	Save	Attendance	Record
159	October 1	Diamondbacks	7–3	Lincecum (15–7)	Haren (14–10)		27,941	86–73
160	October 2	@ Padres	7–2	Medders (5–1)	Correia (12–11)		26,776	87–73
161	October 3	@ Padres	2–0	LeBlanc (3–1)	Cain (14–8)	Bell (42)	25,732	87–74
162	October 4	@ Padres	4–3 (10)	Affeldt (2–2)	Webb (2–1)	Wilson (38)	25,082	88–74

=== Roster ===
2009 San Francisco Giants
Roster
Pitchers: 41 Jeremy Affeldt; 40 Madison Bumgarner; 18 Matt Cain; 43 Alex Hinshaw; 46 Bob Howry; 60 Waldis Joaquín; 51 Randy Johnson; 55 Tim Lincecum; 49 Joe Martinez; 56 Osiris Matos; 52 Brandon Medders; 45 Justin Miller; 37 Pat Misch; 31 Brad Penny; 54 Sergio Romo; 37 Dan Runzler; 56 Ryan Sadowski; 57 Jonathan Sánchez; 47 Merkin Valdez; 38 Brian Wilson; 75 Barry Zito	Catchers: 20 Steve Holm; 1 Bengie Molina; 28 Buster Posey; 22 Eli Whiteside; Infielders: 35 Rich Aurilia; 7 Emmanuel Burriss; 37 Matt Downs; 19 Kevin Frandsen; 23 Ryan Garko; 29,13 Jesús Guzmán; 10 Travis Ishikawa; 16 Édgar Rentería; 29 Ryan Rohlinger; 21 Freddy Sanchez; 48 Pablo Sandoval; 5 Juan Uribe; Outfielders: 21,20 John Bowker; 14 Fred Lewis; 33 Aaron Rowand; 12 Nate Schierholtz; 59 Andrés Torres; 8 Eugenio Vélez; 2 Randy Winn	Manager: 15 Bruce Bochy; Coaches: 6 Tim Flannery (third base); 26 Mark Gardner (bullpen); 39 Roberto Kelly (first base); 9 Carney Lansford (hitting); 32 Dave Righetti (pitching); 17 Ron Wotus (bench)

== Player stats ==
=== Batting ===
Note: G = Games played; AB = At bats; R = Runs scored; H = Hits; 2B = Doubles; 3B = Triples; HR = Home runs; RBI = Runs batted in; AVG = Batting average; SB = Stolen bases

Player	G	AB	R	H	2B	3B	HR	RBI	AVG	SB
Pablo Sandoval	153	572	79	189	44	5	25	90	.330	5
Randy Winn	149	538	65	141	33	5	2	51	.262	16
Aaron Rowand	144	499	61	130	30	2	15	64	.261	4
Bengie Molina	132	491	52	130	25	1	20	80	.265	0
Edgar Rentería	124	460	50	115	19	1	5	48	.250	7
Freddy Sanchez	111	457	56	134	29	3	7	41	.293	5
Juan Uribe	122	398	50	115	26	4	16	55	.289	3
Travis Ishikawa	120	326	49	85	10	2	9	39	.261	2
Fred Lewis	122	295	49	76	21	3	4	20	.258	8
Nate Schierholtz	116	285	33	76	19	2	5	29	.267	3
Eugenio Vélez	84	285	40	76	13	5	5	31	.267	11
Emmanuel Burriss	61	202	18	48	6	0	0	13	.238	11
Andrés Torres	75	152	30	41	6	8	6	23	.270	6
Eli Whiteside	49	127	15	29	6	1	2	13	.228	0
Rich Aurilia	60	122	10	26	2	0	2	16	.213	0
Ryan Garko	40	115	10	27	3	1	2	12	.235	0
John Bowker	31	67	7	13	2	2	2	7	.194	1
Tim Lincecum	32	66	8	10	1	0	0	3	.152	0
Matt Cain	32	60	2	9	2	1	0	3	.150	0
Matt Downs	17	53	6	9	2	0	1	2	.170	1
Barry Zito	32	51	2	6	0	0	0	0	.118	0
Kevin Frandsen	23	50	3	7	2	0	0	1	.140	0
Jonathan Sánchez	31	41	2	3	0	0	0	0	.073	0
Randy Johnson	20	26	1	2	0	0	0	0	.077	0
Jesus Guzman	12	20	0	5	0	0	0	0	.250	0
Ryan Rohlinger	12	19	0	3	1	0	0	4	.158	0
Buster Posey	7	17	1	2	0	0	0	0	.118	0
Brad Penny	6	14	0	0	0	0	0	0	.143	0
Ryan Sadowski	6	10	0	1	0	0	0	0	.100	0
Joe Martinez	10	8	2	2	1	0	0	0	.250	0
Steve Holm	4	7	1	2	0	0	0	0	.286	0
Justin Miller	42	3	0	0	0	0	0	0	.000	0
Jeremy Affeldt	73	2	0	1	0	0	0	0	.500	0
Madison Bumgarner	4	2	0	0	0	0	0	0	.000	0
Bob Howry	61	2	0	0	0	0	0	0	.000	0
Brandon Medders	60	2	0	0	0	0	0	0	.000	0
Brian Wilson	67	2	0	0	0	0	0	0	.000	0
Osiris Matos	5	1	0	1	0	0	0	1	1.000	0
Sergio Romo	44	1	0	0	0	0	0	0	.000	0
Alex Hinshaw	9	0	0	0	0	0	0	0	.000	0
Waldis Joaquín	10	0	0	0	0	0	0	0	.000	0
Dan Runzler	11	0	0	0	0	0	0	0	.000	0
Merkin Valdéz	46	0	0	0	0	0	0	0	.000	0
Team totals	162	5493	657	1411	275	43	122	612	.257	78

=== Pitching ===
Note: W = Wins; L = Losses; ERA = Earned run average; G = Games pitched; GS = Games started; SV = Saves; IP = Innings pitched; R = Runs allowed; ER = Earned runs allowed; BB = Walks allowed; K = Strikeouts

Player	W	L	ERA	G	GS	SV	IP	H	R	ER	BB	K
Tim Lincecum	15	7	2.48	32	32	0	225.1	168	69	62	68	261
Matt Cain	14	8	2.89	33	33	0	217.2	184	73	70	73	171
Barry Zito	10	13	4.03	33	33	0	192.0	179	89	86	81	154
Jonathan Sánchez	8	12	4.24	32	29	0	163.1	135	82	77	88	177
Randy Johnson	8	6	4.88	22	17	0	96.0	97	55	52	31	86
Brian Wilson	5	6	2.74	68	0	38	72.1	60	27	22	27	83
Brandon Medders	5	1	3.01	61	0	1	68.2	63	26	23	32	58
Bob Howry	2	6	3.39	63	0	0	63.2	50	26	24	23	46
Jeremy Affeldt	2	2	1.73	74	0	0	62.1	42	14	12	31	55
Justin Miller	3	3	3.18	44	0	0	56.2	47	20	20	27	36
Merkin Valdéz	2	1	5.66	48	0	0	49.1	57	33	31	28	38
Brad Penny	4	1	2.59	6	6	0	41.2	31	13	12	9	20
Sergio Romo	5	2	3.97	45	0	2	34.0	30	15	15	11	41
Joe Martinez	3	2	7.50	9	5	0	30.0	46	27	25	12	19
Ryan Sadowski	2	4	4.45	6	6	0	28.1	28	15	14	17	17
Waldis Joaquín	0	0	4.22	10	0	0	10.2	10	5	5	7	12
Madison Bumgarner	0	0	1.80	4	1	0	10.0	8	2	2	3	10
Dan Runzler	0	0	1.04	11	0	0	8.2	6	1	1	5	11
Alex Hinshaw	0	0	12.00	9	0	0	6.0	10	8	8	7	2
Osiris Matos	0	0	9.00	5	0	0	6.0	11	7	6	1	5
Pat Misch	0	0	10.80	4	0	0	3.1	6	4	4	3	0
Team totals	88	74	3.55	162	162	41	1446.0	1268	611	571	584	1302

== Farm system ==
Level	Team	League	Manager
AAA	Fresno Grizzlies	Pacific Coast League	Dan Rohn
AA	Connecticut Defenders	Eastern League	Steve Decker
A	San Jose Giants	California League	Andy Skeels
A	Augusta GreenJackets	South Atlantic League	Dave Machemer
A-Short Season	Salem-Keizer Volcanoes	Northwest League	Tom Trebelhorn
Rookie	AZL Giants	Arizona League	Mike Goff

LEAGUE CHAMPIONS: San Jose, Salem-Keizer
