= Waldis =

Waldis is a given name and surname. Notable people with the name include:

- Andrea Waldis (born 1994), Swiss racing cyclist
- Otto Waldis (1901–1974), Austrian-American actor
- Waldis Joaquín (born 1986), Dominican baseball player
