= Emmanuel Burriss =

American baseball player (born 1985)

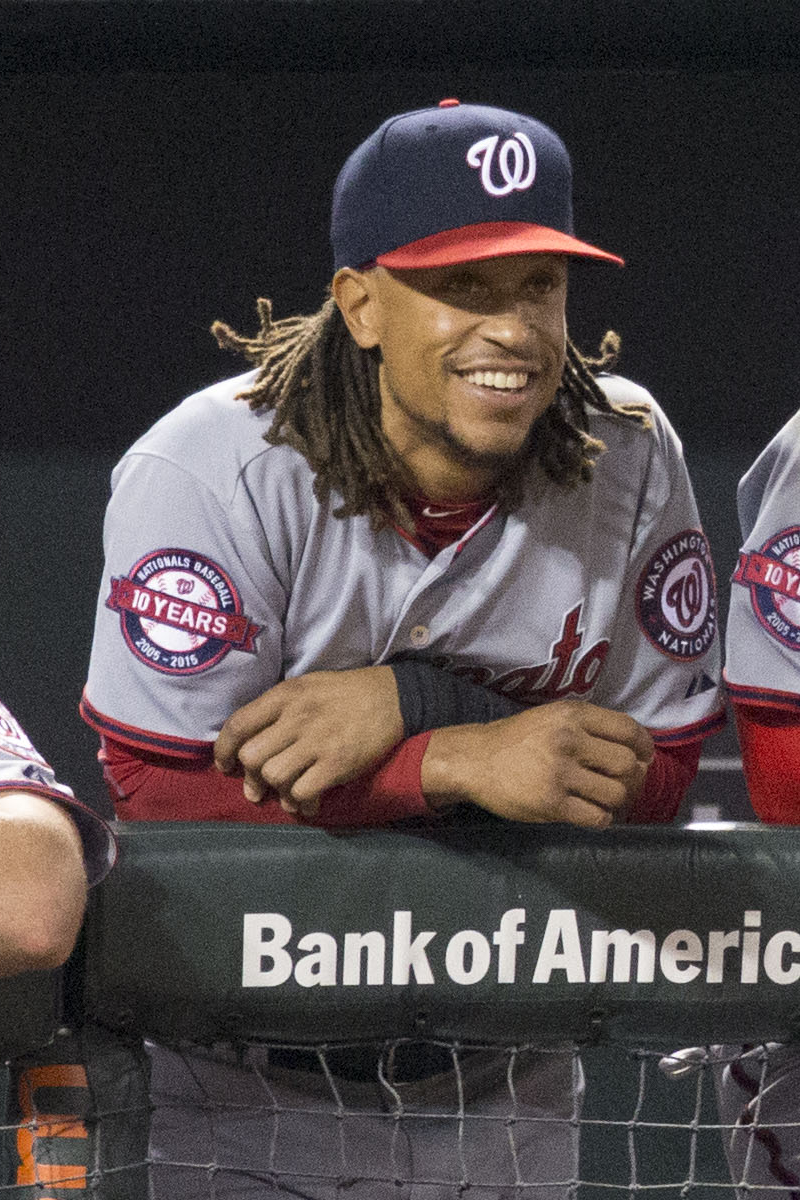
- Burriss with the Washington Nationals
- Utility player
- Born: January 17, 1985 (age 41); Washington, D.C., U.S.
- Batted: Switch Threw: Right

MLB debut
- April 20, 2008, for the San Francisco Giants

Last MLB appearance
- September 28, 2016, for the Philadelphia Phillies

MLB statistics
- Batting average: .237
- Home runs: 1
- Runs batted in: 42
- Stolen bases: 41
- Stats at Baseball Reference

Teams
- San Francisco Giants (2008–2012); Washington Nationals (2015); Philadelphia Phillies (2016)

Emmanuel Allen Burriss (born January 17, 1985) is an American former professional baseball utility player. He played in Major League Baseball (MLB) for the San Francisco Giants, Washington Nationals, and Philadelphia Phillies. He is a switch-hitter who throws right-handed. While primarily a second baseman, Burriss played a variety of positions during his career.

== Early life ==
Emmanuel Allen Burriss was born to parents Allen and Denise on January 17, 1985, in Washington, D.C. His mother works for Washington's Department of Employment Services. Also an ordained minister in the African Methodist Episcopal Church, she administers "serenity yoga workshops" as part of an independent ministry. Raised in the Shaw neighborhood of D.C., Burriss attended St. Ann's Catholic Elementary School. Though he resided in Cardozo High School's district, he attended Woodrow Wilson High School, because that institution offered better opportunities for baseball. At Wilson, he played basketball as well as baseball before graduating in 2003. With his Major League Baseball (MLB) debut in 2008, he became the first MLB player who was a graduate from the Washington, D.C. public school system since catcher Willie Royster played in four games for the Baltimore Orioles in 1981. In 2014, Dave McKenna of The Washington Post called him "the best player to come out of D.C. schools since Los Angeles Dodger great Maury Wills".

Burriss played college baseball at Kent State University (KSU) in Kent, Ohio. In 2005, he played collegiate summer baseball for the Orleans Cardinals of the Cape Cod Baseball League, where he was named a league All-Star and was named the co-Most Valuable Player (MVP) of the playoffs for his performance as the Cardinals won the season championship. With KSU in 2006, he was the Mid-American Conference Player of the Year, leading the conference with 70 runs scored and NCAA Division I players with 42 stolen bases. In his 158-game career at Kent State, Burriss batted .325 and scored 146 runs. Scott Stricklin, his college coach, was extremely impressed with his natural quickness and baseball instincts. The San Francisco Giants drafted Burriss in the first round of the 2006 MLB draft.

== Professional career ==
=== San Francisco Giants ===
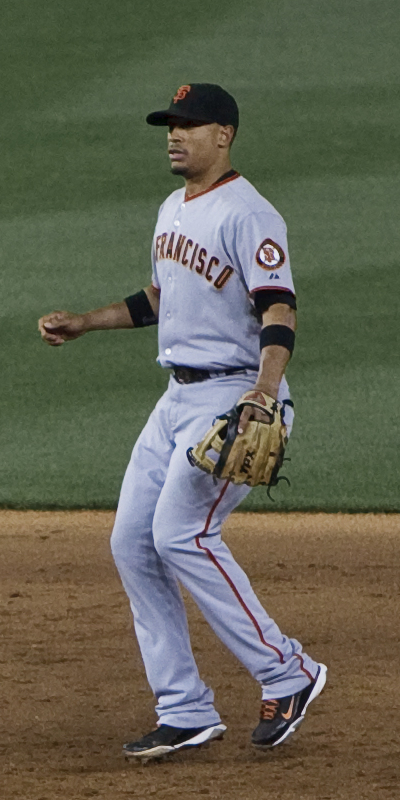
Burris playing for the San Francisco Giants in 2009

Burriss began his professional career in 2006 with the Salem-Keizer Volcanoes of the Single-A short season Northwest League. Playing 65 games, he batted .307. Burriss' 35 stolen bases led the league, and he finished third with 50 runs scored (tied with Tyler Colvin's total behind Mike Epping's 53 and Matt Camp's 51) and fourth with 78 hits (behind Camp's 87, Daniel Mayora's 84, and Cyle Hankerd's 83).

In 2007, Burriss began the year with the Single-A advanced San Jose Giants of the California League. After batting .166 in 36 games, he was demoted to the Augusta GreenJackets of the Single-A South Atlantic League. With Augusta, he was named a postseason all-star, batting .321 with 64 runs scored and 117 hits in 89 games. Burriss stole a combined 68 bases between the teams, the highest total in the Giants' organization. Following the regular season, Burriss played 17 games for the Scottsdale Scorpions of the Arizona Fall League (AFL), batting .365 with eight stolen bases. Used exclusively as a shortstop in his first two regular seasons, Burriss began playing second base as well in the AFL.

Coming into the 2008 season, Burriss was rated the Giants' tenth best prospect and fastest baserunning prospect by Baseball America. He did not make the Giants out of spring training that year, but the Giants purchased his contract from the Triple-A Fresno Grizzlies on April 20 after shortstop Brian Bocock started the season poorly. That same day, he made his MLB debut, replacing Bocock at shortstop in the ninth inning of an 8–2 victory over the St. Louis Cardinals. Against the Los Angeles Dodgers on September 26, he pinch-ran for Bengie Molina on a play that umpires initially deemed a single. The Giants challenged the ruling, and baseball's new instant replay revealed that Molina had actually hit a home run. However, because Burriss had been inserted into the game already, he was credited with the run scored on the play. He finished his rookie season with a .283 batting average in 95 games. After the season, the Giants sent Burriss to the 2008 Arizona Fall League where he played as a member of the Scottsdale Scorpions.

During 2009 spring training, Burriss competed with Kevin Frandsen for the starting second baseman position before being named the starter on April 1. "[Burriss'] all-around play was very solid," remarked Brian Sabean, the Giants' general manager. "It was a unanimous opinion from all involved -- front-office, coaching staff, scouts. He had a tremendous spring." On June 4, Burriss was playing second base as Randy Johnson won his 300th game against the Washington Nationals. Burriss' RBI single in the second inning proved to be the game-winning RBI. Despite that, on Tuesday, June 16, he was sent down to the Triple-A Fresno Grizzlies in favor of Matt Downs after hitting .238/.292/.267 in 61 games. On July 5, 2009, Burriss fractured the fifth metatarsal in his left foot rounding second base at Fresno, ending his season.

Burriss refractured the foot in Spring training 2010. He returned (in Fresno) late in the 2010 season, and was awarded with a call up to the Giants once the Grizzlies' season ended, however he was not placed on the Giants' postseason roster. He appeared in 59 games for the Giants in 2011, splitting time between the Major League club and Fresno. In 2012, Burriss made the Giants out of Spring Training, but on July 28, 2012, he was designated for assignment. Then on September 4, 2012, Burriss was added back to the Giants' roster and finished the year in the Major Leagues only to be sent outright to the Fresno Grizzlies after the end of the season. By outrighting him to the minors, the Giants prevented him from being eligible for arbitration after the season. On November 8, 2012, Burriss elected free agency.

=== Cincinnati Reds ===
On November 21, 2012, Burriss signed a minor league deal with the Cincinnati Reds that included an invitation to spring training. In 2013 spring training, he competed with Jason Donald and César Izturis for the last reserve position on Cincinnati's roster. Ultimately, the Reds added Izturis to their roster on March 31 and reassigned Burriss to the minor leagues. In 108 games for the Triple-A Louisville Bats of the International League, he batted .241 with 32 runs scored, 89 hits, one home run, 24 RBI, and 17 stolen bases. On November 4, he became a free agent.

=== Washington Nationals ===
On December 19, 2013, Burriss signed a minor league contract with the Washington Nationals. In 2014, he has played for the Triple–A Syracuse Chiefs. On June 26, 2015, he had his contract purchased when Anthony Rendon was placed on the disabled list. He made five plate appearances, his first in the major leagues since 2012, and picked up two hits and two walks. He was given and accepted an outright assignment to Syracuse on July 28, 2015. Burriss elected free agency immediately after the 2015 season.

=== Philadelphia Phillies ===
On November 18, 2015, Burriss signed a minor league contract with the Philadelphia Phillies. On April 2, 2016, Burriss had his contract selected after making Philadelphia's Opening Day roster. Burris was designated for assignment by the Phillies on June 1. He cleared waivers and was sent outright to the Triple-A Lehigh Valley IronPigs on June 4. Burriss was recalled by the Phillies on August 19. In 39 games for the team, he went 5-for-45 (.111) with no home run or RBI. On October 7, Burriss was removed from the 40-man roster and sent outright to Triple-A Lehigh Valley. He elected free agency October 15.

=== Washington Nationals (second stint) ===
On December 13, 2016, Burriss signed a minor league contract to return to the Washington Nationals organization. He spent the 2017 season with the Triple–A Syracuse Chiefs, hitting .253/.283/.274 with no home runs and 18 RBI in 42 games. Burriss elected free agency following the season on November 6, 2017.

=== Los Angeles Angels ===
Burriss signed a minor league contract with the Los Angeles Angels on February 7, 2018. He never played a game in the organization.

== Coaching career ==
On February 25, 2024, Burriss was announced as the hitting coach for the Oklahoma City Dodgers, the Triple-A affiliate of the Los Angeles Dodgers.

On January 16, 2026, Burriss was hired to serve as the hitting coach for the Quad Cities River Bandits, the High-A affiliate of the Kansas City Royals.

== Personal life ==
Burriss is a Christian. During his career, he performed the sign of the cross before batting.
