= Eli Whiteside =

American baseball player (born 1979)

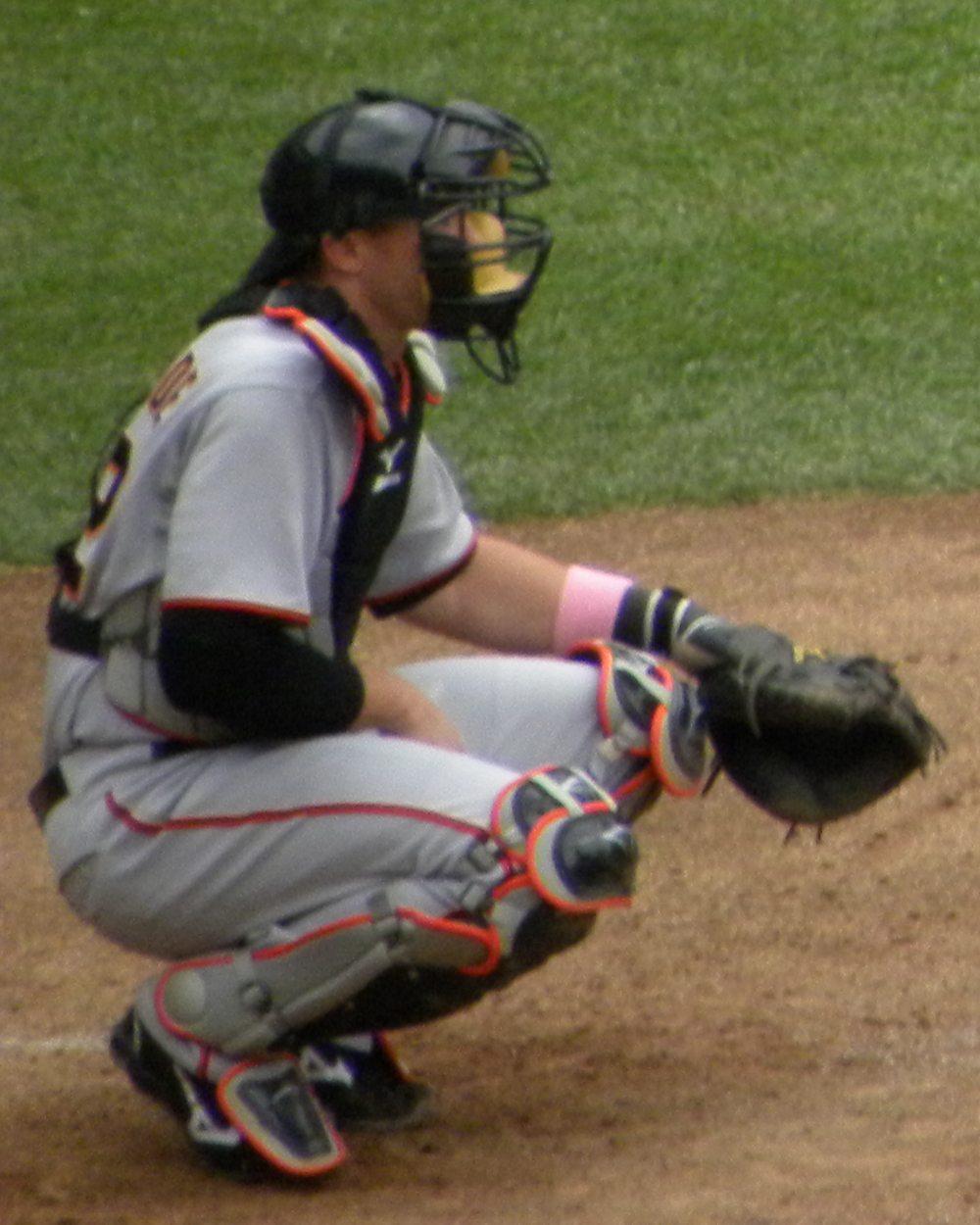
- Whiteside with the San Francisco Giants
- Catcher / Bullpen catcher
- Born: October 22, 1979 (age 46); New Albany, Mississippi, U.S.
- Batted: Right Threw: Right

MLB debut
- July 5, 2005, for the Baltimore Orioles

Last MLB appearance
- June 21, 2014, for the Chicago Cubs

MLB statistics
- Batting average: .210
- Home runs: 10
- Runs batted in: 45
- Stats at Baseball Reference

Teams
- As player: Baltimore Orioles (2005); San Francisco Giants (2009–2012); Chicago Cubs (2014); As coach: San Francisco Giants (2015–present)

Career highlights and awards
- World Series champion (2010)

Dustin Eli Whiteside (born October 22, 1979) is an American former professional baseball catcher who is currently a roving catching instructor for the San Francisco Giants. He stands 6 feet 2 inches (1.88 m) tall, weighs 220 pounds (100 kg). He batted and threw right-handed. He played in Major League Baseball (MLB) for the Baltimore Orioles, San Francisco Giants, and Chicago Cubs.

Whiteside attended Delta State University before being drafted in the sixth round of the 2001 Major League Baseball (MLB) Draft by the Baltimore Orioles. He played in their organization through 2007, though he only played nine games in the major leagues with the Orioles, all coming in 2005. He signed with the Minnesota Twins in 2008 but was released after playing for their Triple-A team for a month. The San Francisco Giants then signed him, assigning him to the minor leagues. He was called up to be their backup catcher in May 2009, and he caught Jonathan Sánchez's no-hitter on July 10. In 2010, he remained the backup catcher and was on the Giants' roster when they won the World Series, despite not playing any playoff games.

After an injury to Buster Posey in May 2011, Whiteside split time catching with Chris Stewart for the rest of the year. He lost the role of backup to Héctor Sánchez in 2012 and appeared in just 12 games for the Giants during their second World Series-winning season in three years. Following 2012, Whiteside was claimed off waivers multiple times by different clubs before finally winding up with the Texas Rangers, who assigned him to their Triple-A team in 2013. In 2014, he competed for a spot on the Cubs' roster but was beaten out by John Baker and sent to the minors.

== Early life ==
Whiteside was born on October 22, 1979, in New Albany, Mississippi. He was raised on an 80-acre farm that belonged to his grandfather. Whiteside attended W. P. Daniel High School, where he played both baseball and soccer before graduation in 1998.

He then spent three years at Delta State University, majoring in business. At Delta State, he was an All-American, an All-Gulf South Conference, and an All-Region player all three years with the baseball team, in which he batted .390/.440/.620. After his junior year in 2001, the Baltimore Orioles drafted Whiteside in the sixth round of the Major League Baseball (MLB) Draft.

== Professional career ==
=== Baltimore Orioles (2005) ===
Whiteside began his minor league career in 2001 with the Single-A Delmarva Shorebirds of the South Atlantic League. In 61 games (212 at bats), he batted .250 with 53 hits, seven home runs, and 28 runs batted in (RBI). He finished second on the club in home runs and had a caught stealing percentage of 41%. Next season, he played for both the Single-A advanced Frederick Keys of the Carolina League and the Double-A Bowie Baysox of the Eastern League. He spent most of the season with Frederick, batting .259 with 89 hits, eight home runs, and 42 RBI in 80 games (313 at bats). In 27 games (99 at bats) with Bowie, he hit .263 with 26 hits, two home runs, and 11 RBI. His combined totals for the two leagues were 107 hits, 10 home runs, and 53 RBI in 107 games (412 at bats).

Outside of a rehab assignment, Whiteside spent all of 2003 with Bowie. In 81 games (265 at bats), he batted .204 with 54 hits, one home run, and 23 RBI. Defensively, he had a .989 fielding percentage and threw out 37% of baserunners. In 2004, Whiteside again played with Bowie. He had two-home-run games against the Akron Aeros on May 17 and the Erie SeaWolves on July 28, finishing fourth in the Orioles' organization on the season with 18 home runs. He batted .279 before the Eastern League All-Star break but hit just .206 afterwards. In 90 games (297 at bats), he hit .253 with 75 hits. Defensively, he posted a .986 fielding percentage. He batted .310 in away games as opposed to .187 in home games. Following the season, he played for the Peoria Javelinas of the Arizona Fall League, batting .329 with 20 RBI in 18 games.

Whiteside moved up to the Triple-A Ottawa Lynx of the International League in 2005, and the Orioles signed veteran catcher Sal Fasano to mentor him. On July 4, Whiteside was called up by the Orioles after Gerónimo Gil was placed on the disabled list. He made his major league debut the next day, entering as a defensive replacement for Fasano in a 12–3 loss to the New York Yankees. Four days later, making his first major league start, he got his first hit, an RBI single against Scott Cassidy in a 9–1 victory over the Boston Red Sox. He appeared in six games and committed two throwing errors, one of which was important. On July 19, he made a wild throw to second base on a stolen base attempt that put Joe Mauer in position to score the tying run from third on a wild pitch in a 4–3 loss to the Minnesota Twins. Whiteside was sent back to Ottawa on July 25 when Javy López came off the disabled list. In 95 games (317 at bats) with Ottawa, Whiteside hit .233 with 74 hits, four home runs, and 27 RBI while posting a caught stealing percentage of 40%. He was also called up in September, appearing in three more games. In nine games (12 at bats) with the Orioles, Whiteside had three hits and one RBI.

Whiteside was considered a "long shot" to make the Orioles' roster in 2006, but he remained in spring training with the Orioles until they made their final cuts on April 1 and sent him to Ottawa. On May 21, Whiteside had four RBI in a game against the Rochester Red Wings, and he had back-to-back three-hit games against the Norfolk Tides from July 23 through 24. In 92 games (315 at bats) with Ottawa in 2006, Whiteside batted .244 with 77 hits, 11 home runs, and 47 RBI. His batting average was .281 at home compared to .201 on the road. In 2007, Whiteside attended spring training but was reassigned to the minors on March 27, coinciding with the Orioles' acquisition of Alberto Castillo. Whiteside began the season with the Orioles' Triple-A affiliate, which was now the Norfolk Tides, but after he batted .180 in 18 games he was reassigned to Bowie on May 11. He spent time on the disabled list from June 18 through July 12 with a fractured right cheekbone. Upon returning, he had a seven-game hitting streak, but he was lost for the season on August 6 after suffering a concussion. In 42 games (141 at bats) with Bowie, Whiteside hit .291 with 41 hits, four home runs, and 30 RBI. After 2007, he filed for free agency, having played in only nine major league games during his seven years with the Orioles.

=== Minnesota Twins organization (2008) ===
On November 24, 2007, Whiteside signed a contract with the Minnesota Twins for the 2008 season. He played in eight games with the Rochester Red Wings of the International League, batting .167 before getting released on April 30 when Ryan Jorgensen returned from serving a suspension for performance-enhancing drugs.

=== San Francisco Giants (2009-2012) ===
Five days after getting released by the Twins, the San Francisco Giants signed Whiteside. He spent the rest of the year with the Triple-A Fresno Grizzlies of the Pacific Coast League. In 49 games, the most by any catcher with Fresno in 2008, Whiteside batted .238 with 36 hits, two home runs, and 22 RBI. He had a .986 fielding percentage but only threw out seven percent of attempted base-stealers. In 57 games (175 at bats) between Rochester and Fresno, he hit .229 with 40 hits, three home runs, and 23 RBI.

The next season, Whiteside started the year at Fresno again, batting .241 with 28 hits, six home runs, and 24 RBI in 34 games (116 at bats). However, after an elbow injury prevented Pablo Sandoval from catching, the Giants called up Whiteside to be the backup catcher for Bengie Molina on May 24, 2009. The same day, he played his first major league game in four years (and his first for a National League team). He finished the game with a hit and an RBI in three at-bats. Matt Cain said of Whiteside, "He's been great. He's a guy who definitely takes advantage of his days in between, when he's not catching, and asking what guys threw in situations and what the pitches were, so he isn't thrown into the fire the days he's starting. Even if he doesn't see a team, he's still figuring out how guys got them out. He's definitely always learning." On July 10, 2009, Molina was scheduled to catch, but was unable to because he went to see his wife, who was having a baby. Whiteside caught in his place, and Jonathan Sánchez, starting in place of the injured Randy Johnson, threw a no-hitter against the San Diego Padres. When asked if he thought it was more unlikely for Sánchez to throw a no-hitter or for him to catch it, he said, "Probably me catching one." He hit a grand slam, his first Major League home run, against Brian Moehler of the Houston Astros in a 10–6 Giants' victory on August 5, 2009. He joined Bobby Bonds, Dave Kingman, Brandon Crawford and Brian Dallimore as the only Giants to hit a grand slam for their first home run. He finished the year with 29 hits in 49 games (126 at-bats), two home runs, and 13 RBI. Defensively, he posted a .993 fielding percentage while catching 39% of attempted base stealers.

In 2010, for the first time in his career, Whiteside made an MLB team out of spring training. He served as Sánchez's personal catcher for much of the season, catching 19 of his starts. Following Molina's trade to the Texas Rangers on June 30, Whiteside saw his playing time reduced as Buster Posey caught more and more games; Whiteside would only start six of the Giants' final 57 games. He finished the regular season with a .238 batting average, appearing in 73 games. Though Whiteside did not appear in any playoff games, he was on the team's roster throughout the playoffs, earning his first career championship title after the Giants won the series against the Rangers.

In 2011, Whiteside again began the year as the backup catcher. However, following Posey's season-ending leg injury on May 25, 2011, he moved into a more prominent role, splitting starting time with Chris Stewart. On June 22, he had two hits (including a triple) and a season-high three RBI in a 5–2 victory over the Twins. He had a season-high three hits on July 14 in a 12-inning, 6–2 victory over San Diego. From August 19 through August 25, he was on the seven-day disabled list with a concussion. In 82 games (213 at bats), Whiteside hit .197 with 42 hits, four home runs, and 17 RBI. Defensively, he threw out 25% of attempted base stealers. He was non-tendered after the season and briefly became a free agent before being re-signed to a one-year deal with the Giants.

In 2012 spring training, Whiteside competed with Stewart for the backup catcher job. However, the Giants ultimately decided to give the role to prospect Héctor Sánchez, a promising hitter who had been expected to start the season with Fresno to work on his defense. Stewart was traded to the Yankees and Whiteside was sent to Fresno. In 60 games (201 at bats) with Fresno, he hit .224 with 45 hits, one home run, and 20 RBI. On July 18, 2012, Whiteside was called up from Fresno when Héctor Sánchez was placed on the disabled list, appearing in six games before being optioned back to Fresno on August 1 when Sánchez returned from the disabled list. He was then recalled on August 26 to be the third-string catcher. Whiteside appeared in 12 games with the Giants in 2012, having one hit (an RBI double) in 11 at bats. He threw out three out of five attempted base stealers. This time, he was left off the playoff roster as the Giants went on to win the World Series in a four-game sweep against the Detroit Tigers.

=== 2012-13 offseason ===
Due to the emergence of Héctor Sánchez, Whiteside did not expect to return to the Giants after 2012. "I didn't really think I'd be back with the Giants. Love that team and love that organization. They've got a good thing going there. Good group of guys and I've enjoyed the time I've spent there." On November 5, 2012, Whiteside was claimed off waivers by the New York Yankees, agreeing to terms with them on a one-year contract worth $625,000 in the Major Leagues and $200,000 in the Minors on November 26. Just two days later, the Yankees designated Whiteside for assignment to make room for Andy Pettitte. On December 3, he was claimed off waivers by the Toronto Blue Jays.

=== Texas Rangers organization (2013) ===
Nine days later, Whiteside was claimed off waivers by the Texas Rangers. He was designated for assignment by the Rangers on January 3, 2013, and removed from the 40 man roster to make room for Jason Frasor. Whiteside cleared waivers the next day and was assigned to the Rangers' Triple-A affiliate Round Rock Express of the Pacific Coast League.

Whiteside attended 2013 spring training as a non-roster invitee, appearing in five games. He played 2013 with the Round Rock Express, where he split time at catcher with Robinson Chirinos and José Félix. In 67 games (225 at bats) with the Express, he hit .187 with 5 home runs and 25 RBI. On October 1, he filed for free agency.

=== Chicago Cubs ===
On November 15, 2013, Whiteside signed a minor league contract with the Chicago Cubs, with an invitation to spring training. He competed with John Baker and George Kottaras for the backup catcher role, and was assigned to the Triple-A Iowa Cubs of the Pacific Coast League on March 27 when Baker was given the role. His contract was selected from Iowa on June 3 when Welington Castillo was placed on the disabled list. Whiteside appeared in eight games, batting .120. He was designated for assignment on June 22 when Castillo returned from the disabled list, and sent outright to the Iowa Cubs on June 25. Whiteside elected free agency in October 2014.

=== Retirement ===
He signed a minor league contract with the Atlanta Braves during the off-season in 2015, but decided to retire instead. He returned to the San Francisco Giants as a bullpen catcher.

== Personal life ==
Whiteside married his high school sweetheart, Amy, in 2004. They have two sons: Whit and Wake who play soccer at TFC New albany. Whiteside is easily recognized by his completely gray hair, which he said began to gray when he was in high school. Whiteside said, "I've come to terms with it. As long as it doesn't fall out, I'll be doing all right, I think." After Whiteside won the 2010 World Series, his hometown of New Albany declared an "Eli Whiteside Day" and presented Whiteside with a key to the city.
