= Matt Downs =

American baseball player (born 1984)

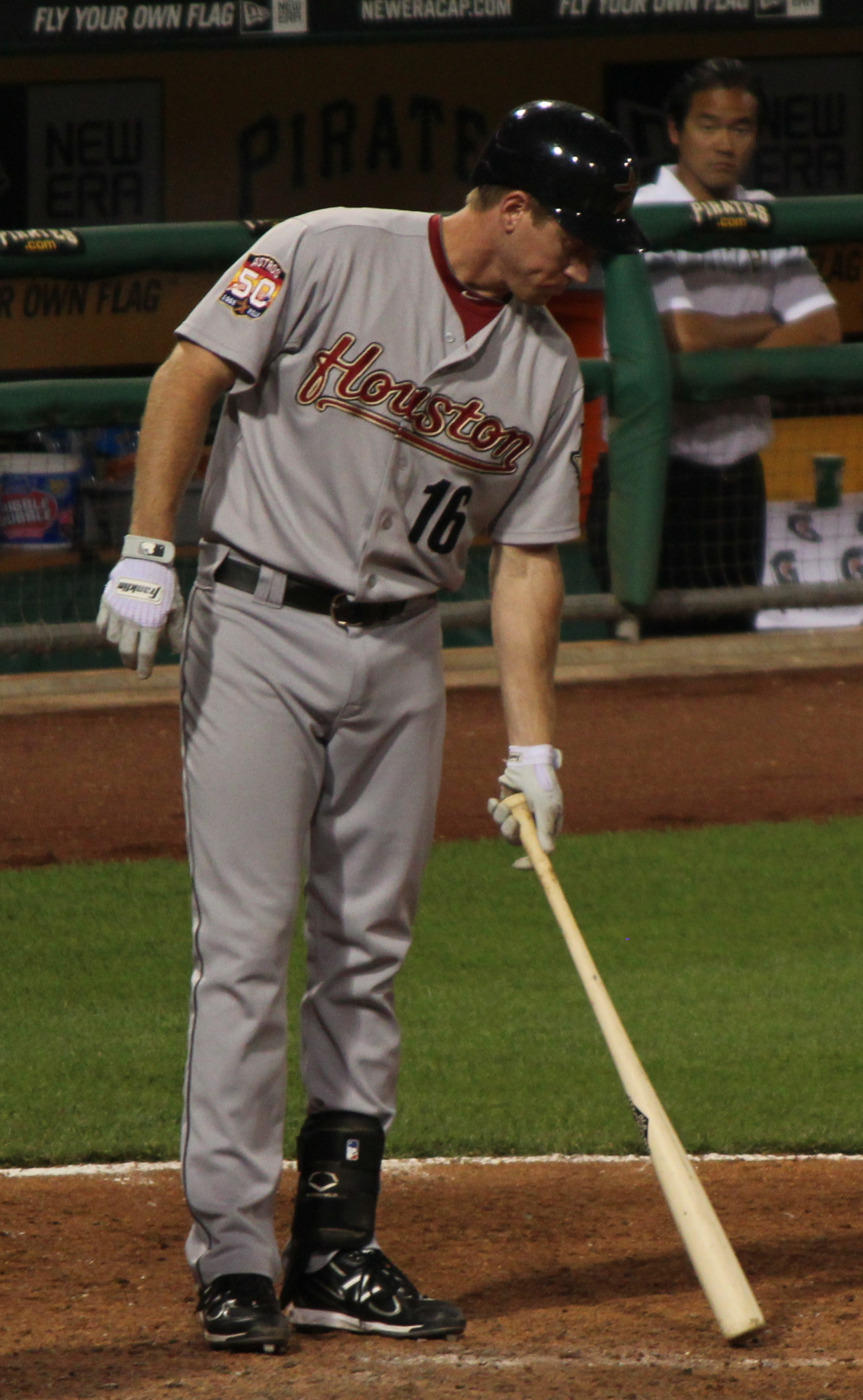
- Downs with the Houston Astros in 2012
- Infielder
- Born: March 19, 1984 (age 42); Tuscaloosa, Alabama, U.S.
- Batted: Right Threw: Right

MLB debut
- June 16, 2009, for the San Francisco Giants

Last MLB appearance
- October 3, 2012, for the Houston Astros

MLB statistics
- Batting average: .230
- Home runs: 20
- Runs batted in: 66
- Stats at Baseball Reference

Teams
- San Francisco Giants (2009–2010); Houston Astros (2010–2012)

Matthew Russell Downs Sr. (born March 19, 1984) is an American former professional baseball infielder. He played in Major League Baseball (MLB) for the San Francisco Giants and Houston Astros. He bats and throws right-handed. He stands 6 feet 1 inch (1.85 m) tall and weighs 190 pounds (86 kg).

Downs attended Shelton State Community College and the University of Alabama; he was drafted out of Alabama by the San Francisco Giants in 2006. Despite being a 36th round draft pick, Downs reached the major leagues in 2009, starting at second base temporarily for the Giants during the season. He played a few games with them in 2010 before he was claimed off waivers by the Houston Astros in August. Downs spent the entire 2011 season in the major leagues, batting .276 and leading the major leagues with 15 pinch-hit RBI. In 2012, his average dropped to .202. Following the season, the Astros made him a free agent. He signed a minor league contract with the Miami Marlins in 2013, spending the season in the minor leagues before getting released. Currently, Downs is the head coach of Marion Military Institute baseball team.

== Early life ==
Downs graduated from Bibb County High School in Centreville, Alabama, following which he played a year as a pitcher/infielder for Shelton State Community College in 2003. For the next three years, he played college baseball at the University of Alabama. He was used mostly as a pitcher in 2004 and 2005, posting a 2–1 record and a 4.91 earned run average (ERA). In 2006, used only as a batter, he batted .298 with seven home runs and 62 runs batted in (RBI). Downs helped Alabama win the Southeastern Conference Championship in 2006, earning a Player of the Week Award in May after his strong hitting against the University of Tennessee helped Alabama clinch the championship.

== Professional career ==
=== San Francisco Giants ===
==== 2006–2008 ====
He was drafted in the 25th round by the Pittsburgh Pirates in the 2003 MLB June Amateur Draft, while he still played for Shelton State Community College. In 2006, the San Francisco Giants drafted him in the 36th round out of Alabama. He played in 2006 for the Arizona League Giants of the rookie Arizona League, batting .310 with 34 runs scored, 52 hits, 16 doubles (second in the league behind John Alonso's 17), zero home runs, and 29 RBI.

Downs played in 2007 for the Salem-Keizer Volcanoes of the Single-A (short season) Northwest League. In 73 games (tied with Garrett Baker and Helder Velazquez for second in the league behind Darin Holcomb), he hit eight home runs and had 48 RBI. He led the league in runs scored (68) and doubles (33); he finished second to Luis Durango in batting average (.338) and hits (97). He was named the Northwest League co-MVP in 2007 while playing for the Volcanoes; aided by his contributions, the Volcanoes won the Northwest League championship.

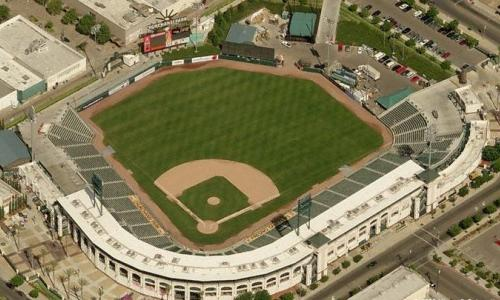
Chukchansi Park was Downs's home stadium during his tenure with the Grizzlies from 2008 through 2010

In 2008, Downs played for the Giants' Single-A San Jose Giants of the California League. In 109 games, he batted .304 with 74 runs scored, 133 hits, 30 doubles, 17 home runs, and 75 RBI. After the season, he was named to the California League All-Star team. From June 23 through July 18, he played for the Triple-A Fresno Grizzlies of the Pacific Coast League. In 22 games with Fresno, he batted .244 with 10 runs scored, 21 hits, five doubles, three home runs, and seven RBI.

==== 2009 ====
In 2009, Downs attended spring training with the Giants, but he began the season at Fresno. On June 16, Downs was called up to the Giants, replacing Emmanuel Burriss as the Giants' second baseman. On June 17, he recorded his first two major league hits against Matt Palmer in a 4–3 loss to the Los Angeles Angels of Anaheim. On June 28, he hit his first home run (against Jeff Suppan) in a 7–0 victory over the Milwaukee Brewers. He was optioned back to Triple-A July 3 after batting .194, but he was recalled again on July 21 after Juan Uribe (his replacement at second base) struggled. Downs started five games in a row at second on this stint; after recording two hits in 17 at-bats, he was returned to Fresno where he finished the season. In 109 games with Fresno, Downs batted .300 with 68 runs scored, 127 hits, 33 doubles, 14 home runs, and 74 RBI.

==== 2010 ====
Downs attended spring training with the Giants again in 2010 but began the season in Fresno. On April 17, he was called up to be a reserve player after Aaron Rowand was injured. At the beginning of May, he became the Giants' everyday second baseman when Uribe was moved to shortstop to replace the injured Édgar Rentería. Downs batted .264 with five RBI in 15 games as the Giants' second baseman, but on May 19, he returned to a utility role as Freddy Sanchez was activated from the disabled list. He was sent to Fresno on May 27 to make room for Waldis Joaquín on the roster. He was called up again in June; he appeared in three games before he was returned to Fresno. Downs was designated for assignment by the San Francisco Giants on August 23 to make room for Cody Ross. In 29 games with the Giants, he batted .244 with six runs scored, 19 hits, seven doubles, one home run, and seven RBI. In 56 games with Fresno, he batted .254 with 37 runs scored, 50 hits, nine doubles, seven home runs, and 28 RBI.

=== Houston Astros ===
==== 2010 ====
Downs was claimed off waivers by the Houston Astros on August 25 and sent to the Triple-A Round Rock Express of the Pacific Coast League. He was called up by the Astros on September 1 but was unavailable for a few days due to a rule which requires players claimed off waivers to spend at least 10 days in the minor leagues. Used sparingly by the Astros, Downs batted .105 with two runs scored, two hits, no home runs, and no RBI in 11 games. In 40 games with San Francisco and Houston in 2010, he batted .216 with eight runs scored, 21 hits, seven doubles, one home run, and seven RBI. In six games with Round Rock, he batted .105 with two hits, one double, no home runs, and two RBI.

==== 2011 ====
In 2011, Downs made the Astros out of spring training as a reserve player. He had a game-winning double against Nick Masset on April 7, giving the Astros their first victory of the year as they defeated the Cincinnati Reds 3–2. On June 22, he hit a game-winning, pinch-hit, two-run home run against Neftalí Feliz as the Astros defeated the Texas Rangers 5–3. On September 19, he hit a game-winning home run against Masset as the Astros beat the Reds 3–2. He also made his first major league start in the outfield that day. Three days later, he had a game-winning, pinch-hit, three-run double against Matt Reynolds as the Astros beat the Colorado Rockies 9–6. In 106 games (199 at bats), Downs batted .276 with 29 runs scored, 55 hits, 18 doubles, 10 home runs, and 41 RBI. He batted .349 as a pinch hitter, (fifth in the league among pinch hitters), and he tied for the league lead with three pinch-hit home runs. His 15 pinch-hit RBI led the majors and were second for a single season in Astros' history to Orlando Merced's 17 in 2001.

==== 2012 ====
Downs was again used as a reserve player in 2012. He received starts occasionally at several positions, most often at first base. His home run against Clayton Richard accounted for all of the scoring on June 27 as the Astros beat the San Diego Padres 1–0. On July 18, he had three hits, two home runs, and four RBI against Richard in an 8–4 loss to the Padres. He was optioned to the Oklahoma City RedHawks of the Pacific Coast League on August 9 to make room for the newly acquired Tyler Greene on the roster; however, he was recalled on September 1. In 91 games (178 at-bats) with the Astros, Downs batted .202 with 15 runs scored, 36 hits, four doubles, eight home runs, and 16 RBI. In 24 games with Oklahoma City, he batted .267 with 14 runs scored, 24 hits, two doubles, three home runs, and 15 RBI. After the season, Downs was outrighted off the Astros' roster; he became a free agent.

=== Miami Marlins ===
On January 31, 2013, the Miami Marlins signed Downs to a minor league contract with an invitation to spring training. He failed to make the team and was sent to minor league camp on March 26. Downs spent the season with the New Orleans Zephyrs of the Pacific Coast League where, in 82 games, he batted .215 with 27 runs scored, 58 hits, 11 doubles, eight home runs, and 35 RBI before getting released by the Marlins.

== Coaching career ==
On November 7, 2013, Downs was hired as the head coach of Marion Military Institute baseball team.

== Personal life ==
Downs is married to Leah. The couple has one child, Matthew Russell Downs, Jr., born July 18, 2011.
