= John Bowker (baseball) =

American baseball player (born 1983)

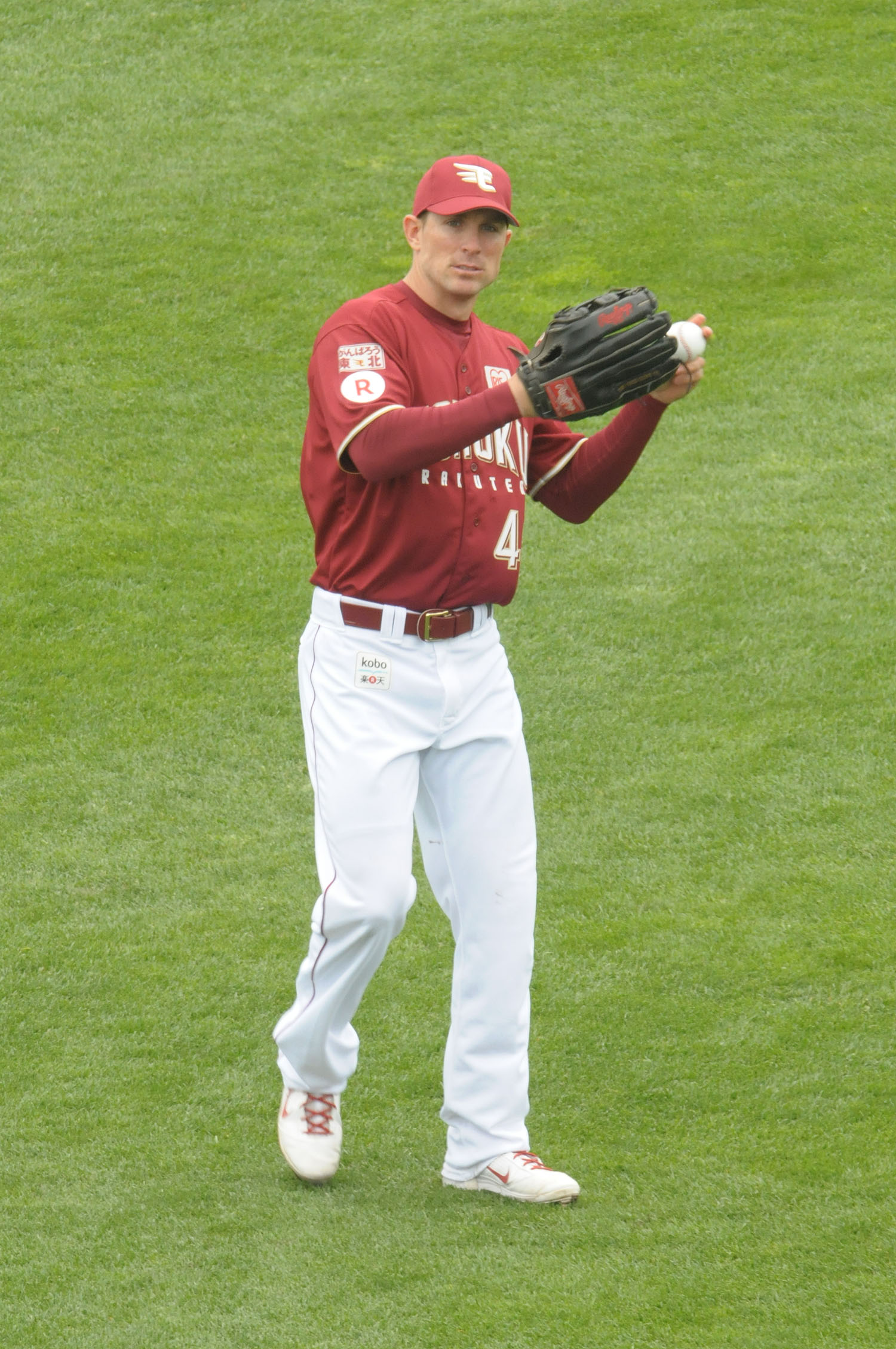
- Bowker with the Tohoku Rakuten Golden Eagles
- First baseman / Outfielder
- Born: July 8, 1983 (age 43); Sacramento, California, U.S.
- Batted: Left Threw: Left

Professional debut
- MLB: April 12, 2008, for the San Francisco Giants
- NPB: March 30, 2012, for the Yomiuri Giants

Last appearance
- MLB: September 27, 2011, for the Philadelphia Phillies
- NPB: August 16, 2014, for the Tohoku Rakuten Golden Eagles

MLB statistics
- Batting average: .232
- Hits: 133
- Home runs: 17
- Runs batted in: 73

NPB statistics
- Batting average: .239
- Hits: 160
- Home runs: 24
- Runs batted in: 78
- Stats at Baseball Reference

Teams
- San Francisco Giants (2008–2010); Pittsburgh Pirates (2010–2011); Philadelphia Phillies (2011); Yomiuri Giants (2012–2013); Tohoku Rakuten Golden Eagles (2014)

Career highlights and awards
- Japan Series champion (2012)

John Brite Bowker (born July 8, 1983) is an American former professional baseball player. An outfielder and first baseman, he played in Major League Baseball (MLB) for the San Francisco Giants, Pittsburgh Pirates, and Philadelphia Phillies and in Nippon Professional Baseball (NPB) for the Yomiuri Giants and Tohoku Rakuten Golden Eagles. Bowker stands 6 feet 1 inch (1.85 m) tall and weighs 205 pounds (93 kg); he bats and throws left-handed.

Bowker was drafted out of Long Beach State University in the third round of the 2004 MLB draft by the San Francisco Giants. He spent the next few years in their minor league system and ranked among the Eastern League leaders in several hitting categories in 2007. He was called up by the Giants shortly after the 2008 season began, and he became the first San Francisco-era Giant to hit a home run in his first two major league games. He was the Giants' starting first baseman for much of the season and finished the year batting .255 with 10 home runs in 111 games.

In 2009, Bowker won the Pacific Coast League batting title with a .342 average. However, he batted .194 in 31 major league games. He began 2010 as the Giants' right fielder, but lost the job soon after the season started. He was optioned to Fresno in June and was traded to the Pittsburgh Pirates at the trade deadline. Bowker was called up by the Pirates in September and finished the 2010 season batting .219 with 5 home runs in 67 games. He started the 2011 season as a reserve outfielder on the Pirates' team but was designated for assignment and sent to the minors after April. He batted .306 with 15 home runs and 76 RBI in 106 games with their International League team before getting traded to the Philadelphia Phillies at the end of August, where he was used mainly as a pinch hitter.

Three seasons in Nippon Professional Baseball followed: two with the Yomiuri Giants, where he won a Japan Series championship in 2012 and was named an Outstanding Player for his contribution, and one with the Rakuten Golden Eagles. He returned to America for a year, spending more time in the minor league systems of both the San Francisco Giants and the Pirates, before he concluded his playing career with a three year spell in independent minor league baseball in Japan.

== Early life ==
Bowker was born to Brite and Chris Bowker on July 8, 1983, in Sacramento, California. Growing up, he attended Mariemont Elementary School, Arden Middle School, and Rio Americano High School. He began his baseball career playing for an Arden Park Little League team coached by his father, and he played baseball at Rio Americano, along with football and basketball. He decided to concentrate on baseball as a sophomore. He lettered three seasons in baseball, two seasons in football and one season in basketball in addition to being named all-league in each of these sports. He set Rio Americano's single-season records for batting average (.463) hits (41), home runs (8) and runs batted in (RBI) (41).

== College career ==
Bowker was not recruited to play baseball out of high school. After graduating from Rio Americano, he enrolled at Long Beach State University (LBSU), and joined the baseball team as a walk-on. As a redshirt freshman, he led the LBSU Dirtbags in home runs (7) and slugging percentage (.563), and was given an honorable mention for the All-Big West team. The following year, he was named to the All-Conference First Team, as the Dirtbags reached the Super Regionals of the NCAA Division I baseball tournament, where they lost to the Arizona Wildcasts. Bowker batted .323 in his two years at Long Beach.

== Professional career ==
=== Draft and minor leagues ===
Bowker entered the 2004 Major League Baseball (MLB) Draft and was selected in the third round by the San Francisco Giants.

To begin his minor league career, Bowker was assigned to the rookie-league Arizona League Giants. After batting .512 with 22 hits, 2 home runs, and 11 RBI in 10 games for the Giants, he was promoted to the Salem-Keizer Volcanoes of the single-A short season Northwest League. With Salem-Keizer, he batted .323 with 41 hits, 4 home runs, and 16 RBI in 31 games. Between the AZL Giants and Salem-Keizer, he appeared in 41 games, batting .371 with 63 hits, 6 home runs, and 27 RBI in 41 games.

In 2005, Bowker attended Giants' spring training but was sent to the minors on March 2. He spent the season with the single-A advanced San Jose Giants. In 121 games, he had 124 hits, 27 doubles, 13 home runs, and 67 RBI while batting .267. He batted .238 with a double, a home run, and 4 RBI in 5 playoff games as San Jose won the California League championship.

Bowker attended spring training with the Giants in 2006, but he was sent to the minors on March 2. He spent most of the season with San Jose, where he batted .284 with 131 hits, 6 triples, 7 home runs, and 66 RBI in 112 games. His 32 doubles ranked tenth overall in the league. In 5 playoff games, he batted .182 with 4 hits, 2 doubles, and 1 triple. He also appeared in two games for the triple-A Fresno Grizzlies of the Pacific Coast League, where he had two hits in four at bats.

Bowker attended spring training with the Giants in 2007 but only appeared in two spring training games. He spent the entire season with the Connecticut Defenders, the Giants' double-A affiliate in the Eastern League. He set career highs with 139 games played, a .307 batting average, 160 hits, 22 home runs, 90 RBI, 35 doubles, and 6 triples. He ranked seventh in the league in batting average (among qualifiers), first in games, second in hits (to Jordan Brown), fifth in doubles (tied with David Smith), fifth in triples (tied with Clete Thomas and Michael Spidale), and third in RBI (behind Jeff Larish and Oscar Salazar). His 22 home runs were tied for fifth in the league (with Salazar and Luis Jiménez) and set a Connecticut franchise record.

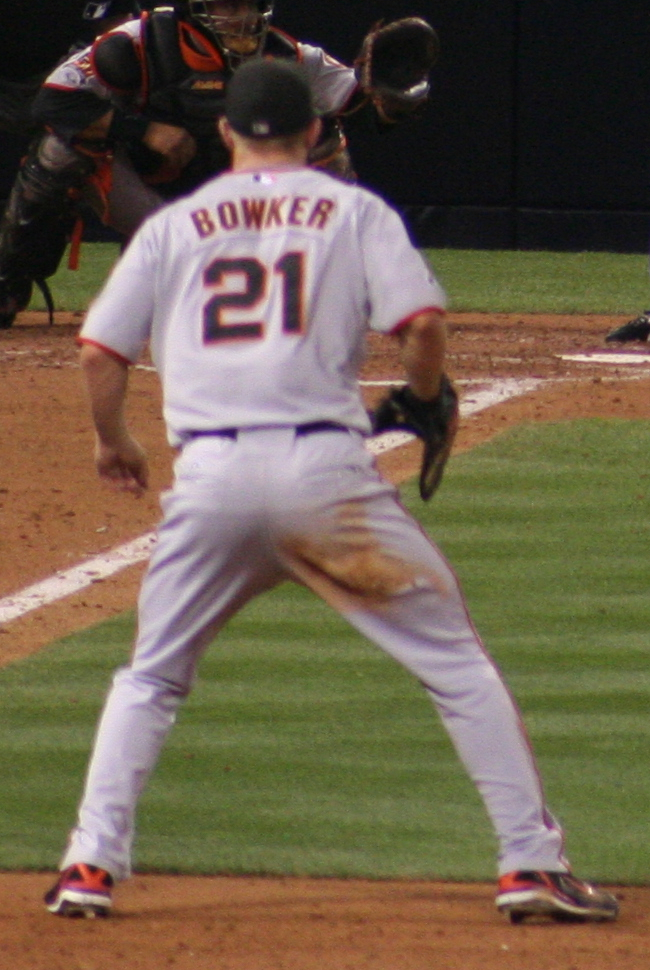
Bowker playing first base with the San Francisco Giants

Entering the 2008 season, Bowker was named the ninth best prospect in the Giants' organization by Baseball America. He attended spring training again but was sent to Fresno on March 11.

=== San Francisco Giants (2008–2010) ===
==== 2008 ====
On April 11, Bowker was called up by the Giants, and he joined the team the next day after having only 3 hours of sleep the night before. In a 7–5 loss to the St. Louis Cardinals that day, he got his first hit (a single) and drove in three runs with his first home run, both against Todd Wellemeyer, as he became the eighth player in San Francisco Giants history to hit a home run in his debut. The next day, in the Giants' 7–4 victory over the Cardinals, Bowker had four RBI and hit his second home run, against Joel Piñeiro, becoming the first player in San Francisco Giants history to hit a home run in each of his first two Major League games. He had seven RBI in his first two games, the most by any major leaguer in his first two games since Joe Cunningham had seven in 1954.

Bowker replaced Rich Aurilia as the Giants' starting first baseman on April 21. On June 7, he hit the first grand slam of his career, against Luis Ayala, in a 6–0 victory over the Washington Nationals. On July 2, Bowker hit a two-run "Splash Hit" home run into McCovey Cove against Ryan Dempster in a 6–5 loss to the Chicago Cubs. He was batting .274 before the All-Star break, but after batting .152 with two RBI in 21 games after the break, he was optioned to Fresno on August 13 to make room on the roster for Travis Ishikawa, who replaced him as the Giants' first baseman. He was recalled by the Giants on September 2 after rosters expanded. Used mainly as a pinch-hitter in September, he batted .346 with 1 home run in 15 games to finish the season with a .255 batting average (10th among NL rookies), 83 hits (9th among NL rookies), 14 doubles, 3 triples (tied for 4th among NL rookies), 10 home runs (tied for 4th among NL rookies), and 43 RBI (6th among NL rookies) in 111 games. At Fresno, he batted .237 with 22 hits, 3 doubles, 1 triple, 2 home runs, and 9 RBI in 23 games.

==== 2009 ====
On March 29, 2009, Bowker was optioned to Fresno. In June, Bowker was named the Pacific Coast League player of the week for two straight weeks (May 24–31 and June 1–7) after batting .519 with five doubles, six home runs, 16 runs scored, and 18 RBI over that span. He was called up to the Giants on July 9 when Ryan Sadowski was optioned to Fresno. On July 19, he had a game-winning sacrifice fly against Zach Duke in the Giants' 4–3 victory over the Pittsburgh Pirates. Bowker split time in left field with Randy Winn and at first base with Ishikawa, but he was returned to Fresno on July 26 so the Giants could call up Eugenio Vélez after Bowker batted .156 with 4 RBI in 11 games. He was recalled at the beginning of August but was sent back to Fresno after appearing in two games.

On August 16, Bowker tied a Grizzlies' record (shared by Dante Powell) by driving in seven runs in an 8–5 victory over the Nashville Sounds. He hit three-run home runs against Tim Dillard and John Axford, and he was walked with the bases loaded by David Johnson. On September 1, he was recalled when rosters expanded. He was used mainly as a pinch-hitter until September 23, when he took over left field after Vélez was moved from left field to second base to replace the injured Freddy Sanchez. In 31 games with the Giants that year, Bowker batted .194 with 13 hits, 2 doubles, 2 triples, 2 home runs, and 7 RBI in 67 at bats. In 104 games at Fresno, he batted .342 with 125 hits, 22 doubles, 4 triples, 21 home runs, and 83 RBI. He tied for ninth in the league in home runs (with Prentice Redman) and tied for eight in RBI (with Allen Craig). He led the league in batting, becoming the first Fresno player to win the batting title since Brian Dallimore in 2003. Bowker was named to the PCL's regular-season All-Star team, post-season All-Star team, and All-PCL team.

==== 2010 ====
Although Nate Schierholtz was expected to be the Giants' Opening Day right fielder in 2010, Bowker won the position after hitting six home runs in spring training. On April 7, Bowker hit a two-run home run against Brett Myers in a 10–4 victory over the Houston Astros. After batting .214 with four RBI in his first 10 games, Bowker was replaced by Schierholtz as the starting right fielder on April 17. On May 7, Bowker hit a ninth-inning game-tying home run against Francisco Rodríguez in an eventual 6–4 loss to the New York Mets. After batting .207 with 17 hits, 3 doubles, 3 home runs, and 8 RBI in 41 games, Bowker was optioned to Fresno on June 2 to make room for Pat Burrell on the roster. He was named the PCL Player of the Week from June 14 to June 21 after he had a 13-game hitting streak and a 6-game RBI streak end that week.

=== Pittsburgh Pirates (2010–2011) ===
After batting .310 with 61 hits, 12 doubles, 14 home runs, and 36 RBI in 51 games with Fresno, Bowker and Joe Martinez were traded to the Pittsburgh Pirates on July 31 for Javier López. Upon being acquired, Bowker was assigned by the Pirates to the Indianapolis Indians of the triple-A International League, where he batted .319 in 25 games with 29 hits, 7 doubles, 2 triples, 4 home runs, and 10 RBI. He was called up to the Pittsburgh club on September 1 as rosters expanded. By September 13, he had taken over from Lastings Milledge as the Pirates' everyday right fielder. He hit a two-run home run against Barry Enright and had three hits on September 18 in a 9–6 victory over the Arizona Diamondbacks. Four days later, Bowker again had three hits and two RBI, including a solo home run against Kyle Lohse, in an 11–6 victory over the Cardinals. He had a pinch-hit three-run double against Mike MacDougal on September 28 in a 7–2 victory over the Cardinals. With the Pirates in 2010, Bowker batted .232 with 16 hits, 5 doubles, 2 home runs, and 13 RBI in 26 games. His major league totals from 2010 were 33 hits, 5 doubles, 8 home runs, and 21 RBI in 67 games.

Bowker made the Pirates' Opening Day roster in 2011 as a reserve outfielder. After he had 4 hits (1 double) and 2 RBI in 17 at-bats over 19 games, he was designated for assignment to make room on the roster for Xavier Paul on April 27. On May 4, he was assigned to Indianapolis after clearing waivers. In 106 games with Indianapolis, Bowker batted .306 with 129 hits, 27 doubles, 1 triple, 15 home runs, and 76 RBI (ninth in the league).

=== Philadelphia Phillies (2011) ===
On August 30, 2011, Bowker was traded to the Philadelphia Phillies for a player to be named later or cash. Bowker was used almost exclusively as a pinch-hitter with the Phillies. He had no hits in 13 at-bats with the Phillies and was left off their postseason roster. With the Phillies and Pirates in 2011, Bowker batted .133 with two RBI in 31 games.

=== Playing in Japan and Mexico ===
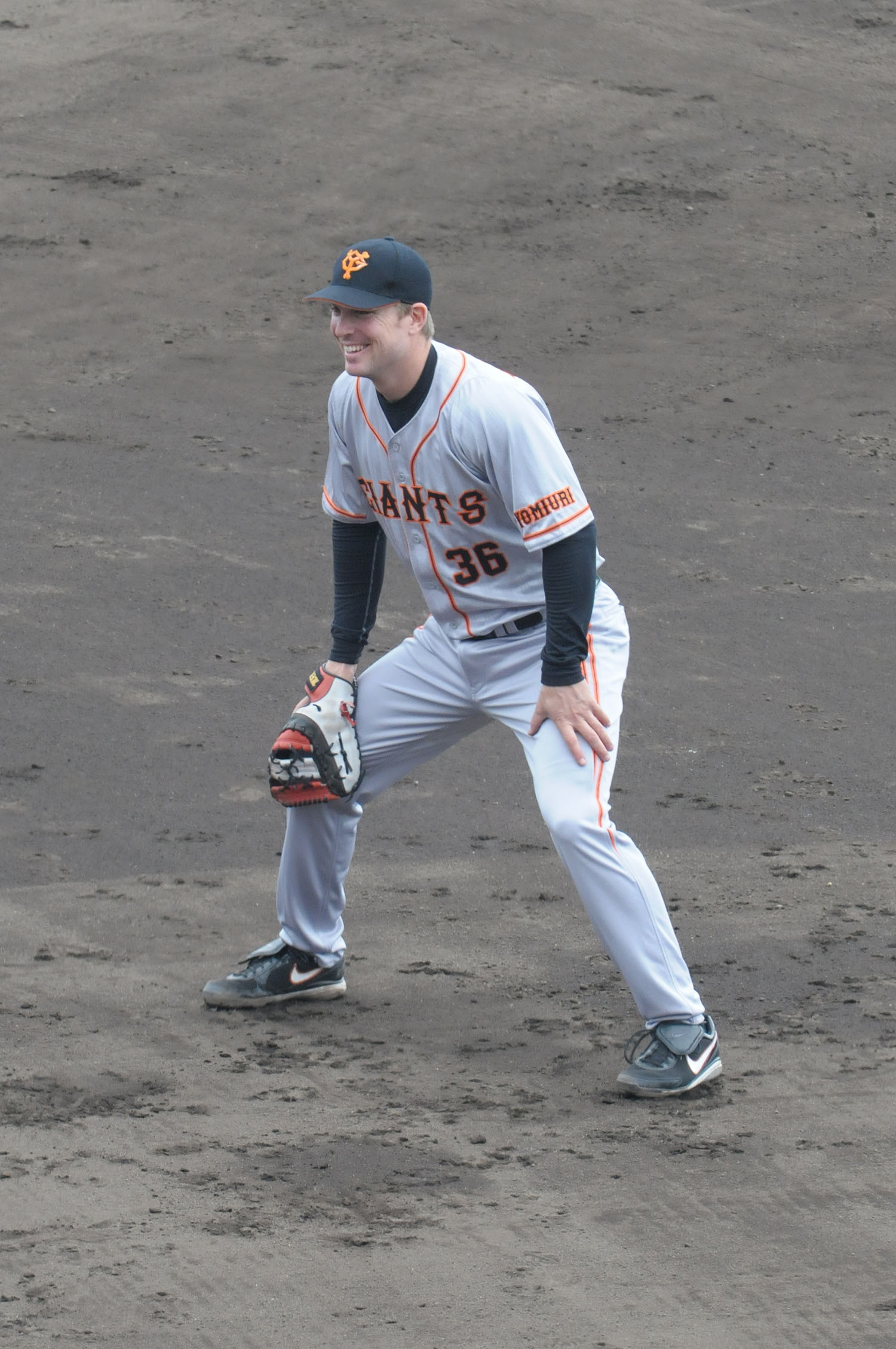
Bowker with Yomiuri.

On January 10, 2012, Bowker was released by the Phillies in order to pursue a career in Nippon Professional Baseball. Three days later, he signed a one-year deal with the Yomiuri Giants. He struggled in the regular season, with a batting average of .196, 3 home runs, and 10 RBIs, and split time between the Giants' NPB and minor league teams. He went 5-for-10 in the Climax Series against the Chunichi Dragons, as the Giants came from 3–1 down to win 4–3. In the Japan Series, Bowker hit home runs in games one and five, with 7 RBIs. He was one of three Giants to win an Outstanding Player award as the team won their 22nd championship.

Bowker returned to the Giants the following year, but missed six weeks of the season after he injured his finger in a game against DeNA BayStars in April. For the season, he improved his batting average to .262, and hit 14 home runs.

The Giants decided against extending Bowker, to his disappointment. He moved to Mexico to play for Piratas de Campeche of the Mexican League in 2014, where he played 20 games and batted .300; he left the team in May to move back to Japan, after the Rakuten Golden Eagles gave him a contract for the NPB season. Bowker proceeded to hit .248 over 65 games, as the Golden Eagles finished 64–80 and failed to qualify for the playoffs.

=== Later career ===
In January 2015, Bowker signed a minor league contract with the Giants, to return to playing baseball in America. He appeared in spring training for the Giants but started the season with his hometown Sacramento River Cats, now the Giants' Triple-A affiliate, and was hoping to return to the major leagues. Bowker hit .263 with three home runs in 43 games for the River Cats and was traded to the Pittsburgh Pirates for cash considerations in June. Assigned to their Triple-A affiliate, the Indianapolis Indians, his batting average dropped to .219, with six home runs. He elected free agency on November 6.

Bowker signed with the Fukushima Hopes of the Baseball Challenge League in 2016, managed by his former Pirates minor league teammate Aki Iwamura, and cited a desire to return to Nippon Professional Baseball. He spent three years with the team, hitting better than .300 in every season, with 44 home runs and 169 RBIs.

== Personal life ==
Growing up, Bowker rooted for the San Francisco Giants, the team that drafted him. His uncle, Jeff Carmichael (who coached him growing up), helped him train during the offseason.
