= Waldis Joaquín =

Dominican baseball player (born 1986)

- Pitcher
- Born: December 25, 1986 (age 39); La Vega, Dominican Republic
- Batted: Right Threw: Right

MLB debut
- August 4, 2009, for the San Francisco Giants

Last MLB appearance
- September 24, 2011, for the San Francisco Giants

MLB statistics
- Win–loss record: 1–0
- Earned run average: 5.40
- Strikeouts: 17
- WHIP: 1.80
- Stats at Baseball Reference

Teams
- San Francisco Giants (2009–2011)

Waldis Joaquín de la Cruz (born December 25, 1986) is a Dominican professional baseball pitcher. He played in Major League Baseball (MLB) for the San Francisco Giants from 2009 through 2011. Joaquín throws three pitches: a fastball, a slider, and a changeup.

Signed by the Giants in 2003, Joaquín reached the major leagues in 2009 and appeared in 10 games, which would be his highest total in an MLB season. Part of the Opening Day roster in 2010, he pitched in four games during San Francisco's World Series championship season. The Chicago White Sox attempted to claim him off waivers in the offseason, but he refused to report to them, nullifying the waiver claim. Returning to the Giants in 2011, he had five games for them in September and received his lone MLB decision, a win.

In 2012, Joaquín was signed by the Washington Nationals, but he missed the season with an injury. He then pitched for four seasons in the Mexican League. In 2017, he signed with the Detroit Tigers but made it no higher than the Double-A level.

== Career ==
=== San Francisco Giants ===
Waldis Joaquín de la Cruz was born on December 25, 1986, in La Vega, Dominican Republic. On October 31, 2003, the San Francisco Giants signed Joaquín as an amateur free agent. His first professional experience came with the Dominican Summer League Giants in 2004; in 14 games (13 starts), he had six wins and a 1.61 earned run average (ERA). He pitched for the Arizona League Giants in 2005, posting a 1–1 record with a 3.64 ERA, 37 strikeouts, and 10 walks in 29 2/3 innings. He did not play in 2006 due to surgery on his right elbow, but he returned in 2007, for the Salem-Keizer Volcanoes of the Single-A (short season) Northwest League, with whom he went 3–0 with a 2.84 ERA, 30 strikeouts, and 16 walks in 38 innings.

In 2008, Joaquín played for the Single-A Augusta GreenJackets of the South Atlantic League and the Single-A advanced San Jose Giants of the California League. He had a combined 1–3 with a 4.42 ERA in 71 1/3 innings over 36 games (seven starts). After the season, he made eight starts for the Waikiki BeachBoys of the Hawaii Winter Baseball League, posting a 2–3 record and a 5.97 ERA.

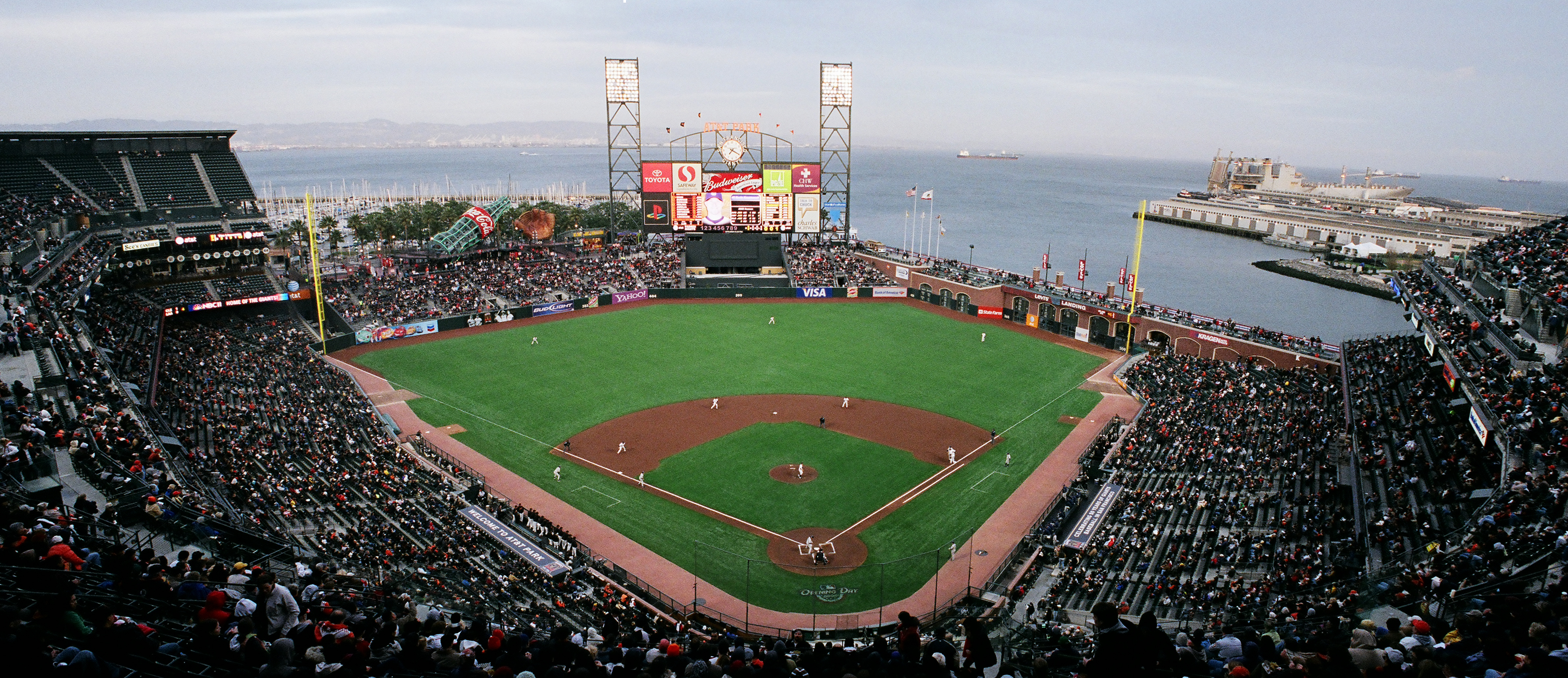
AT&T Park was Joaquín's home stadium during his time with the Giants.

Joaquín began 2009 with the Double-A Connecticut Defenders of the Eastern League. He had a 4–5 record, a 2.67 ERA, 40 strikeouts, and 28 walks in 54 innings pitched. On August 1, Joaquín was called up to the Giants' bullpen; he replaced Ryan Sadowski on the roster. He made his Major League debut on August 4, giving up one run on two hits in pitching the ninth inning in an 8–1 win over the Houston Astros. He was optioned to the minors the next day to make room for Joe Martinez on the roster. Joaquín spent the rest of the minor league season with the Triple-A Fresno Grizzlies of the Pacific Coast League; in eight games, he had a 1–0 record, an 0.00 ERA, 16 strikeouts, and two walks in 10 innings pitched. He was called up again on September 1 when rosters expanded, and he made nine more appearances for the Giants that year. In 10 games with the Giants, which would be his most in an MLB season, Joaquín had no record, a 4.22 ERA, 12 strikeouts, and seven walks in 10 2/3 innings pitched. After the season, he made 16 relief appearances for the Gigantes del Cibao of the Dominican Winter League, posting a 1–0 record and a 2.35 ERA.

Joaquín made the Giants' Opening Day roster in 2010. He threw a scoreless 2/3 of an inning in his first outing, but he gave up runs in each of his next three outings. At the beginning of May, he was sent down to Fresno when Aaron Rowand came off the disabled list. He was called up again on May 27 following an injury to Jeremy Affeldt, but he was sent down to Fresno days later without making an appearance. In four games with the Giants, Joaquín had no record, a 9.64 ERA, two strikeouts, and seven walks in 4 2/3 innings pitched. From June 18 to August 5, he was on Fresno's disabled list with a disc problem in his back. In 23 games (five starts) for Fresno, he had a 1–2 record, a 4.93 ERA, 33 strikeouts, and 22 walks in 34 2/3 innings. He was left off the postseason roster as the Giants won the 2010 World Series against the Texas Rangers. On November 22, Joaquín was claimed off of waivers by the Chicago White Sox. Refusing the waiver claim, he became a free agent. He was re-signed to a minor league contract by the Giants in December 2010. He pitched for the Gigantes in the offseason but only made three appearances, losing one and posting a 27.00 ERA.

Joaquín was invited to spring training by the Giants in 2011, but he was reassigned to extended spring training on April 4 before being assigned to Fresno on May 2. From May 16 through June 2, he was on the disabled list with an elbow injury. In 35 games for the Grizzlies, he had a 2–2 record, a 3.44 ERA, 27 strikeouts, and 23 walks in 49 2/3 innings pitched. The Giants re-added him to the 40-man roster on August 4, and they called him up on September 2. On September 17, he recorded the only MLB decision of his career. After he recorded the final two outs of the seventh inning against the Colorado Rockies, the Giants scored four runs in the eighth to take the lead and held on for a 6–5 victory, with Joaquín getting the win. In his last outing of the season, on September 24, he relieved starter Barry Zito with two runners on base and the Giants trailing the Arizona Diamondbacks 6–2. Joaquín threw two wild pitches as he allowed both runners to score in addition to giving up three runs of his own in one inning of work; San Francisco went on to lose 15–2. For the Giants in 2011, Joaquín appeared in five games, posting a 1–0 record and a 4.26 ERA in 6 1/3 innings, with three strikeouts and three walks. He became a free agent on November 30.

=== Washington Nationals ===
On December 14, 2011, Joaquín signed a minor league contract with the Washington Nationals with an invitation to spring training. He was reassigned to minor league camp on March 15, 2012. However, he did not pitch for any of their minor league teams due to an injury. He did pitch in nine games for the Gigantes after the season, winning one and posting a 6.23 ERA. On November 12, he became a free agent.

=== Sultanes de Monterrey ===
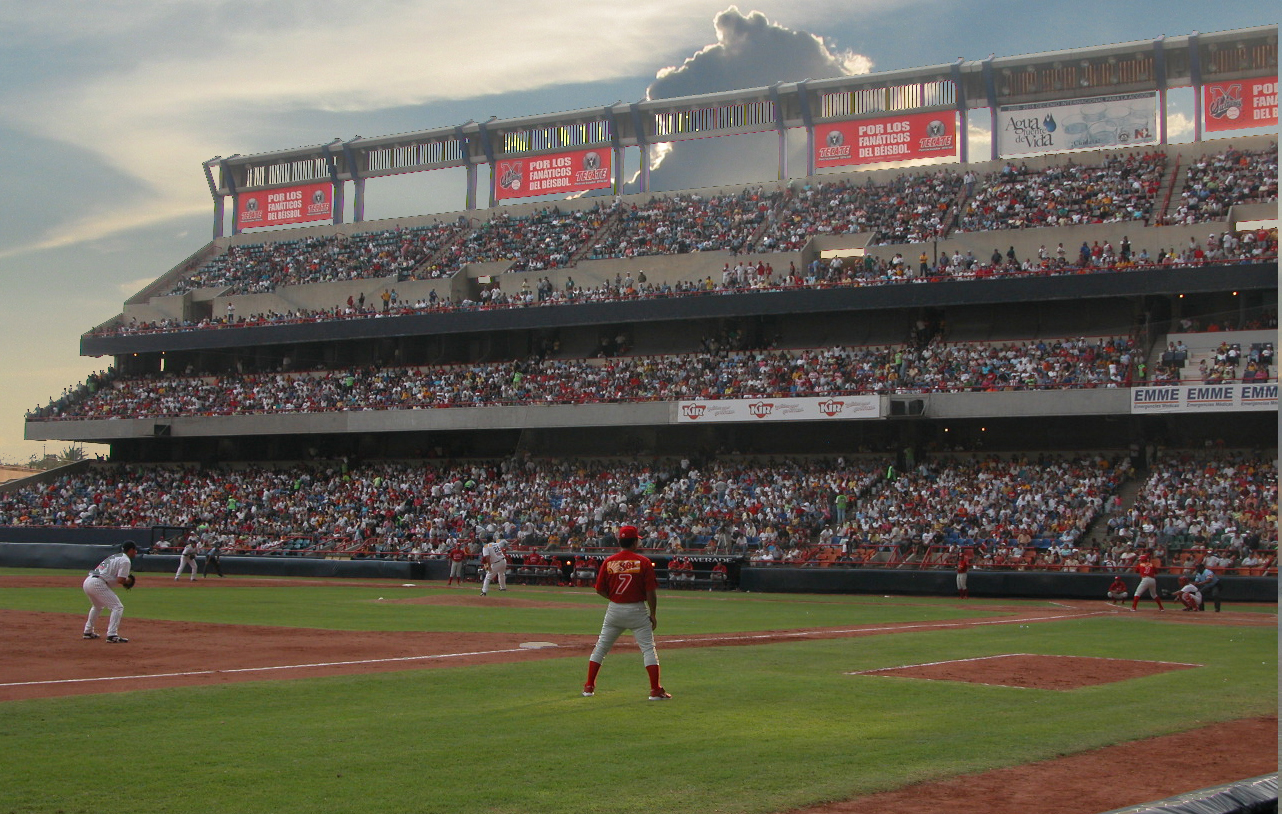
Estadio de Béisbol Monterrey was Joaquín's home ballpark with the Sultanes.

In 2013, Joaquín pitched for the Sultanes de Monterrey of the Mexican League. Making 26 appearances, he had a 4–2 record, four saves, a 3.96 ERA, 10 strikeouts, and seven walks in 25 innings. He made 34 appearances for Monterrey in 2014, posting a 2–5 record, one save, a 4.67 ERA, 33 strikeouts, and 19 walks in 34 2/3 innings pitched. After the season, he pitched in the Dominican Winter League, though this time for the Estrellas de Oriente. In 13 games, he had a 1–0 record and a 6.00 ERA.

=== Acereros de Monclova/Rieleros de Aguascalientes ===
In 2015, Joaquín pitched for two Mexican League teams. Making 31 appearances for the Acereros de Monclova, he had a 2–2 record, eight saves, a 3.41 ERA, 32 strikeouts, and eight walks in 31 2/3 innings. He also made 17 appearances for the Rieleros de Aguascalientes, posting a 2–1 record, three saves, a 3.74 ERA, 14 strikeouts, and eight walks in 21 2/3 innings. Following the season, he returned to the Estrellas, posting a 1–1 record and a 3.86 ERA in 15 games.

=== Saraperos de Saltillo/Vaqueros Laguna ===
Joaquín pitched for two Mexican League teams again in 2016. In eight games for the Saraperos de Saltillo, he had no record, three saves, a 4.32 ERA, seven strikeouts, and one walk in 8 1/3 innings. He also made eight appearances for the Vaqueros Laguna, where he had no record, one save, a 2.35 ERA, five strikeouts, and four walks in 19 innings. After the season, he played winter ball in Venezuela, this time for the Caribes de Anzoátegui. In 18 games, he had a 1–0 record and a 1.89 ERA. He also made one appearance for the Estrellas, allowing two runs in 1/3 of an inning.

=== Detroit Tigers ===
On December 20, 2016, Joaquín signed a minor league contract with the Detroit Tigers. Assigned to extended spring training at the start of the 2017 season, he then pitched in three games for the Lakeland Flying Tigers of the High–A Florida State League before being promoted to the Erie SeaWolves of the Double–A Eastern League. In 12 games (one start), he had a 2–4 record, a 6.06 ERA, 14 strikeouts, and six walks in 16 1/3 innings. He was released on June 19.

=== York Revolution ===
Later that year, Joaquin made six appearances with the York Revolution of the Atlantic League of Professional Baseball. He had a 1–0 record, a 15.43 ERA, five strikeouts, and four walks in 4 2/3 innings.

Over the 2017–18 offseason, Joaquín made 14 appearances for the Caribes, accumulating no record but recording three saves and posting a 4.97 ERA. He made one appearance for the Toros del Este of the Dominican Winter League in the 2018–19 offseason, pitching a scoreless inning. On March 21, 2020, Joaquín signed with the Hamilton Cardinals of the Intercounty Baseball League. However, he did not pitch for the Cardinals, as the league's season was cancelled due to the impact of COVID-19.

== Pitching style ==
Joaquín throws three pitches: a fastball, a slider, and a changeup. The fastball travels 94 miles per hour (151 km/h) to 98 miles per hour (158 km/h) and travels quickly to the upper inside corner of the strike zone for right-handed batters. Left-handed batters can see it more easily. The slider travels in the middle 80 miles per hour (130 km/h) range. Sam Corun of Bleacher Report mentioned in 2010 that his changeup needed to be better in order for him to walk fewer hitters.
