= Joe Martinez (baseball) =

American baseball player (born 1983)

- Pitcher
- Born: February 26, 1983 (age 43); South Orange, New Jersey, U.S.
- Batted: Left Threw: Right

MLB debut
- April 7, 2009, for the San Francisco Giants

Last MLB appearance
- July 5, 2013, for the Cleveland Indians

MLB statistics
- Win–loss record: 4–3
- Earned run average: 5.82
- Strikeouts: 32
- Stats at Baseball Reference

Teams
- San Francisco Giants (2009–2010); Pittsburgh Pirates (2010); Arizona Diamondbacks (2012); Cleveland Indians (2013)

Joseph Andrew Martinez (born February 26, 1983) is an American former Major League Baseball (MLB) pitcher. He played parts of four seasons for the San Francisco Giants (2009–2010), Pittsburgh Pirates (2010), Arizona Diamondbacks (2012), and Cleveland Indians (2013). Martinez threw right-handed but batted left-handed.

A native of South Orange, New Jersey, Martinez played four years of college baseball for the Boston College Eagles. Used exclusively as a starting pitcher as a senior in 2005, he was drafted by the Giants in the 12th round of the 2005 MLB draft. Progressing through the minor leagues, he won the 2009 Harry S. Jordan Award as the Giant who did the best in his first spring training, making San Francisco's Opening Day roster as a result. He picked up the win on Opening Day, April 7, but two days later, he suffered a concussion and three fractured bones when a line drive off the bat of Mike Cameron hit him in the forehead. The injury kept him out for several months, but he returned to the Giants later in the season. After being the Fresno Grizzlies' best starter in 2010, he was called up in mid-June when Todd Wellemeyer was injured; he made one start before being replaced by Madison Bumgarner in the rotation. Midway through the year, he was traded to the Pirates.

Assigned to the minor leagues, Martinez did not pitch for the Pirates until September, when he made five relief appearances. He spent all of 2011 in the minor leagues for Cleveland. In 2012, he pitched in one game for the Diamondbacks, and he made two appearances for Cleveland in 2013. After a brief stint in the minor leagues for the Los Angeles Angels of Anaheim in 2014, he retired. In 2022, MLB hired Martinez as their Senior Director of On-Field Operations.

== High school and college ==
Martinez was born in South Orange, New Jersey, on February 26, 1983. At Seton Hall Preparatory School in West Orange, he played multiple sports at the varsity level: four years of football, three years of baseball, and two years of basketball. As a baseball player, he was twice a member of New Jersey's All-State team. He graduated in 2001 and became a member of the school's Hall of Fame in 2007.

Following high school, Martinez played college baseball for the Boston College Eagles. As a freshman in 2002, he posted a 0–0 record, allowing no earned runs in 26 innings pitched. In 2003, he posted a 1–0 record with a 9.16 earned run average (ERA) in six games (two starts), pitching 18 2/3 innings. He went 2–4 with a 0.87 ERA in 15 games (seven starts) in 2004, striking out 56 batters in 52 innings. After the 2004 season, he played collegiate summer baseball with the Hyannis Mets of the Cape Cod Baseball League. He was named a league all-star and posted a 2–5 record with a 2.84 ERA.

In Martinez's senior year of 2005, the Eagles used him entirely as a starting pitcher. On April 18, he was named the Big East Pitcher of the Week after recording 11 strikeouts while shutting out the Rutgers Scarlet Knights. He won the award for a second time on May 16 after pitching his fifth consecutive complete game, a three-hit shutout of the Pittsburgh Panthers. In 2005, he made 12 starts, posting an 8–3 record, a 2.63 ERA, and 97 strikeouts in 89 innings pitched.

== Playing career ==
=== San Francisco Giants ===
==== Draft and minor leagues ====
The San Francisco Giants drafted Martinez in the 12th round of the 2005 Major League Baseball draft, and he began his professional career the same year. He played for the Low-A Salem-Keizer Volcanoes of the Northwest League in 2005, going 4–3 with a 4.30 ERA in 15 games (13 starts). Martinez allowed nine home runs that year, the third-most in the league. In 2006, he played for the Single-A Augusta Greenjackets of the South Atlantic League, going 15–5 with a 3.01 ERA in 26 starts. His 15 wins and 167 2/3 innings pitched trailed only Matt Maloney's totals for the league lead, and he also finished in the top five in starts (third) and ERA (fifth).

In 2007, Martinez pitched For the High-A San Jose Giants of the California League. He twice recorded 11 strikeouts, first against the Stockton Ports on May 1, and later against the Modesto Nuts on July 13. He went 10–10 with a 4.26 ERA in 28 starts. Martinez's 151 strikeouts led the league; at the same time, he walked only 36 batters. Promoted to the Double-A Connecticut Defenders in 2008, Martinez became an Eastern League All-Star. He was the league's pitcher of the week for the period ending June 23, during which he threw seven scoreless innings in a victory over the New Hampshire Fisher Cats. In 27 starts, Martinez went 10–10, leading the Eastern League with a 2.49 ERA.

==== 2009 ====
In 2009, Martinez won the Harry S. Jordan Award, presented annually by the Giants to a player who exemplifies performance and dedication in his first spring training. He competed with Keiichi Yabu and Ramón Ortiz to be the Giants' long reliever. At the end of spring training, he was named to the team's Opening Day roster at the end of spring training. Martinez posted a 1.72 ERA over his final five appearances of the preseason, and Giants reliever Sergio Romo was still recovering from an elbow injury. "We like the way (Martinez) throws," said Giants' manager Bruce Bochy. "He holds runners and does all the little things on the mound. He handles the bat. He throws strikes. He has a good sinker."

Martinez made his MLB debut on Opening Day (April 7), relieving Tim Lincecum after the starter allowed three runs in three innings against the Milwaukee Brewers. In what the Associated Press called a "rocky two innings", Martinez gave up two earned runs but picked up the victory, as the Giants took and held the lead in a 10–6 triumph. Two days later, in the ninth inning against Milwaukee, a line drive off the bat of Mike Cameron struck Martinez in the forehead, lacerating him and causing a nose bleed. He was able to walk off the field unaided, but was taken to a local hospital. Doctors diagnosed him with a concussion and three small fractures to his skull, but they expected him to make a full recovery. He spent a few days in the hospital as a precaution. Reporter Jeff Chiu called the incident "one of the most frightening moments a pitcher can have on the mound", adding that Martinez "was lucky not to have been more seriously injured on the play".

After missing several months of the season, Martinez was sent to the minor leagues for a rehab assignment. All seven of his appearances were starts, as the Giants still hoped for him to be a starting pitcher. On August 5, 2009, Martinez returned to the major leagues, facing the Houston Astros in his first major league start. He replaced Ryan Sadowski in the pitching rotation. Martinez won the game, allowing three runs in five innings with no walks and four strikeouts. He made several more starts that month but failed to pitch more than five innings in any of them. On August 28, he was optioned to the Triple-A Fresno Grizzlies of the Pacific Coast League after giving up eight runs the night before in an 11–0 loss to the Arizona Diamondbacks. Martinez was recalled by the Giants on September 8 but made only two more appearances for them the rest of the year, both in relief.

In nine games (five starts), Martinez had a 3–2 record, a 7.50 ERA, 19 strikeouts, 12 walks, and 46 hits allowed in 30 innings pitched. He was the Giants' nominee for the Hutch Award, given annually to a player who perseveres through adversity, though Mark Teahen was the eventual winner.

==== 2010 ====
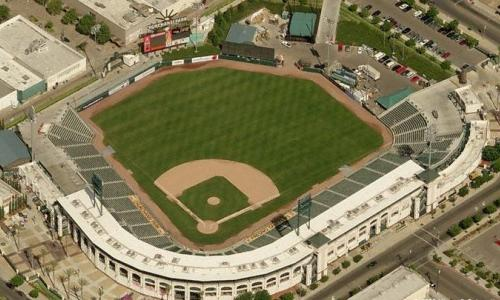
Chukchansi Park was Martinez's home stadium during his time with the Grizzlies.

Martinez attended spring training with the Giants in 2010, but right elbow inflammation limited him to one game, and he was optioned to Fresno on March 23. That season, The Fresno Bee reported that he was "arguably [the Grizzlies'] best starter". In 14 games (13 starts), he posted a 5–3 record, a 3.32 ERA, 65 strikeouts, 26 walks, and 78 hits allowed in 81 1/3 innings pitched. Due to an injury to Todd Wellemeyer, Martinez was called up by the Giants on June 11. Starting in place of Wellemeyer against the Baltimore Orioles on June 15, Martinez pitched 6 1/3 innings but allowed four runs in a 4–1 defeat. "I was a little out of synch not having pitched for 10 days, but it was good enough to get a lot of ground balls that just found holes," Martinez afterwards described his performance. The Giants elected to use top prospect Madison Bumgarner the next time Wellemeyer's turn in the rotation came around, and Martinez was moved to the bullpen. Seldom-used, he made only four appearances (counting the start) through the trade deadline of July 31, posting an 0–1 record and a 4.91 ERA. On that date, he was traded to the Pittsburgh Pirates with John Bowker for Javier López.

After his departure, the Giants went on to win the 2010 World Series. As a member of the team that season, he received a ceremonial World Series ring, which he had to pick up from a FedEx distribution center in New Jersey.

=== Pittsburgh Pirates ===
The Pirates immediately optioned Martinez to the Triple-A Indianapolis Indians of the International League. In seven games (four starts), he posted a 1–2 record, a 5.72 ERA, 18 strikeouts, seven walks, and 46 hits allowed in 28 1/3 innings. He was promoted by the Pirates on September 5. Despite Martinez's starting experience, manager John Russell said the team planned to use him as a relief pitcher. He made five relief appearances for them, recording no record and a 3.12 ERA. In nine games (one start) combined between San Francisco and Pittsburgh, he had an 0–1 record, a 4.12 ERA, nine strikeouts, nine walks, and 26 hits allowed in 19 2/3 innings.

=== Cleveland Indians ===
On January 4, 2011, Martinez was traded by the Pirates to the Cleveland Indians for cash considerations. He was outrighted to the International League's Columbus Clippers on February 18. In 35 games (16 starts), he had an 8–9 record, a 4.04 ERA, 101 strikeouts, 29 walks, and 136 hits allowed in 118 innings. The Clippers won the International League championship. In the Triple-A National Championship Game on September 20, Martinez threw seven innings and was named the game's Most Valuable Player as Columbus defeated the Omaha Storm Chasers by a score of 8–3. On November 2, he became a free agent.

=== Arizona Diamondbacks ===
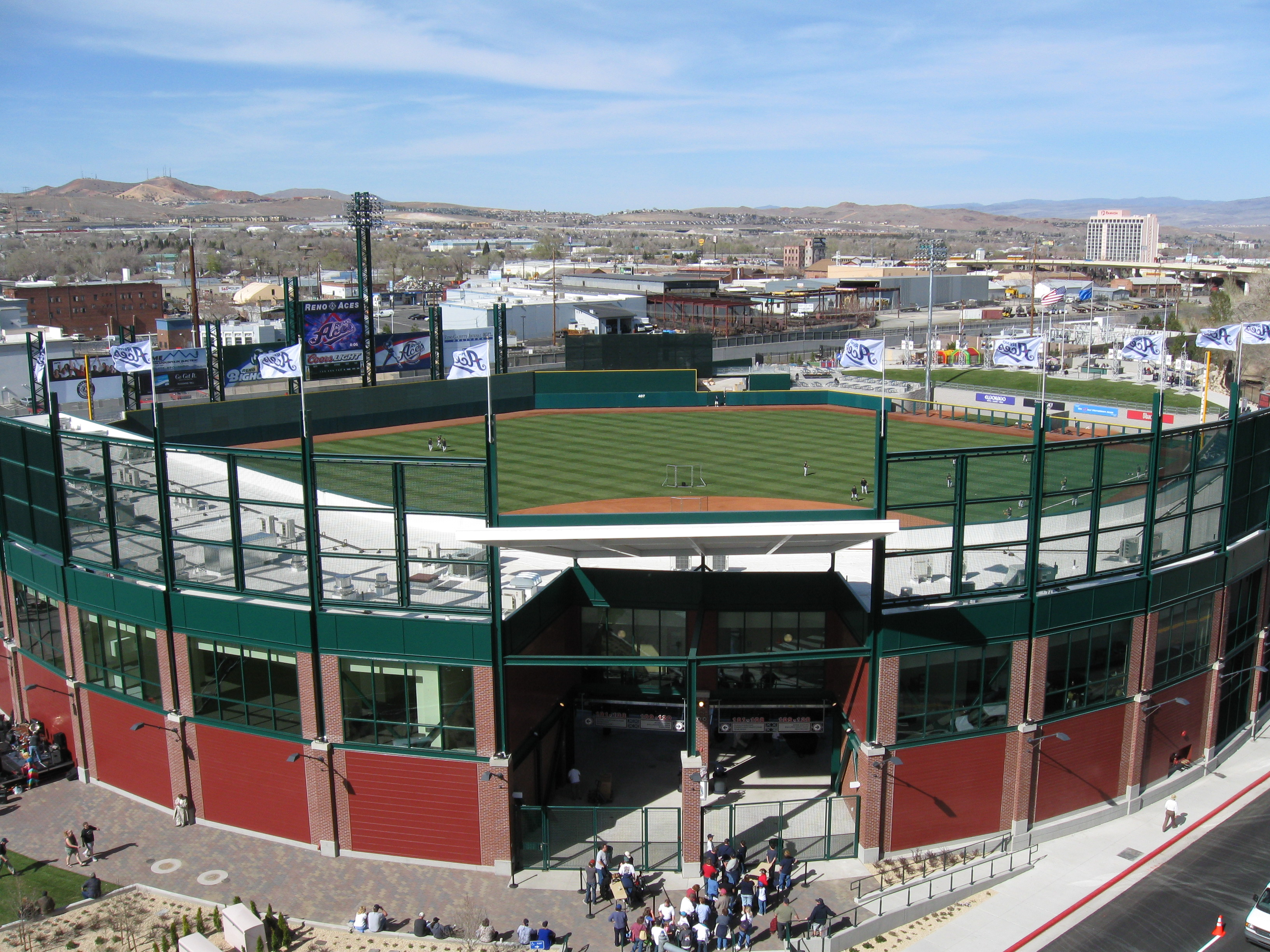
With Reno in 2012, Martinez pitched at Aces Ballpark.

Martinez signed a one-year contract with the Arizona Diamondbacks on December 5, 2011. He began the 2012 season with the Pacific Coast League's Reno Aces. On April 24, he and fellow pitcher Mike Zagurski were recalled to Arizona as Joe Paterson was sent to the minor leagues and Jonathan Albaladejo was designated for assignment. Fox Sports suggested that the Diamondbacks intended to use him as a long reliever, as Wade Miley, who had previously filled the role, was now making starts. Martinez made his lone MLB appearance of the year on April 25, giving up one run in the final inning of a 7–2 loss to the Philadelphia Phillies. Five days later, he was sent back to Reno when Patrick Corbin was called up for the first time. In 27 starts for Reno, he had a 10–11 record, a 5.39 ERA, 99 strikeouts, 49 walks, and 206 hits allowed in 155 1/3 innings. His 11 losses tied with five others for second-most in the Pacific Coast League, behind Zach Jackson's 13. On October 25, Martinez became a free agent, following his removal from the team's 40-man roster.

=== Cleveland Indians (second stint) ===
Martinez re-signed with the Cleveland Indians on December 14, 2012, on a minor league contract that included an invitation to spring training. After opening the 2013 season with Columbus, he was added to the major league roster on June 29 when Matt Langwell was sent down. He pitched two scoreless innings in that day's game, earning the victory in a 4–3 triumph over the Chicago White Sox. "He really clutched up...that's not the easiest situation to be put into," manager Terry Francona said of Martinez's entering a tied game for his first MLB appearance in over a year. Six days later, he pitched the final three innings and allowed a run in a 7–0 loss to the Detroit Tigers. Following that game, he was sent back to Columbus so the Indians could promote Carlos Carrasco. In 24 games (21 starts), he had a 3–7 record, a 5.26 ERA, 90 strikeouts, 27 walks, and 163 hits allowed in 130 innings pitched. He filed for free agency on October 1.

=== Los Angeles Angels ===
On March 4, 2014, Martinez signed with the Los Angeles Angels of Anaheim. He lost all three starts that he made for the Salt Lake Bees of the Pacific Coast League, posting a 16.36 ERA before announcing his retirement on April 21.

== Career statistics and pitching style ==
In 21 games (six starts) over parts of four MLB seasons, Martinez posted a 4–3 record, a 5.82 ERA, 32 strikeouts, 21 walks, and 78 hits allowed in 55 2/3 innings. His primary pitch was a fastball, which he threw 64.9 percent of the time during his MLB career; it averaged 90.1 miles per hour (145.0 km/h). He also threw a curveball 26.7 percent of the time and a changeup 7.2 percent of the time; these pitches travelled around 80 miles per hour (130 km/h). In the two games in which he pitched in 2013, he threw the fastball less than half the time, relying more heavily on his secondary pitches, as well as a cut fastball. He threw right-handed but batted left-handed.

== Personal life ==
Martinez's father, Javier Sr., is a teacher who came to the United States from Cuba in 1961. Martinez's mother, Toni, is also a teacher; she was employed by Columbia High School. His younger brother, Javier Jr., pitched in the Seattle Mariners organization in 2007 and 2008. Martinez and his wife Casey have three children together.

During the baseball offseason, Martinez worked as a substitute teacher, a job that he left after retiring from baseball. He worked as a financial advisor after leaving baseball and declined his acceptance into the Master of Business Administration program at Columbia University in favor of a job at PricewaterhouseCoopers. On February 1, 2022, MLB hired Martinez as their Senior Director of On-Field Operations.
