= Jonathan Sánchez =

Puerto Rican baseball player (born 1982)

- Sánchez in his first start with the Royals
- Pitcher
- Born: November 19, 1982 (age 44); Mayagüez, Puerto Rico
- Batted: Left Threw: Left

MLB debut
- May 28, 2006, for the San Francisco Giants

Last MLB appearance
- April 29, 2013, for the Pittsburgh Pirates

MLB statistics
- Win–loss record: 39–58
- Earned run average: 4.70
- Strikeouts: 796
- Stats at Baseball Reference

Teams
- San Francisco Giants (2006–2011); Kansas City Royals (2012); Colorado Rockies (2012); Pittsburgh Pirates (2013)

Career highlights and awards
- World Series champion (2010); Pitched a no-hitter on July 10, 2009

Jonathan Omar Sánchez (born November 19, 1982), nicknamed "the Kid" and "the Comeback Kid", is a Puerto Rican former professional baseball pitcher. He is one of only three Puerto Rican players to throw a no-hitter game in MLB, the others being John Candelaria in 1976 and Juan Nieves in 1987. A left-handed starter, Sánchez's pitching repertoire consisted of a low-to-mid 90s mph fastball, a change-up, and a slurve in the 80s.

After being drafted by the San Francisco Giants in 2004, Sánchez quickly worked his way through the Giants' minor league system. In 2006, he was called up to the major leagues and was used mostly in a long relief role. In 2007, he made the team out of spring training and was again used mostly in long relief, though he spent part of his season in the minors. In 2008, he made the Giants' starting rotation and remained in it for the entire year, except for a stint on the disabled list.

Sánchez began 2009 as a starter but was moved to the bullpen during the season. On July 10, he threw a no-hitter against the San Diego Padres, starting in place of an injured Randy Johnson. In 2010, Sánchez struck out 200 batters for the first time and was a member of the Giants team that won the World Series. In 2011 he married a Dominican model named Audris Rijo. He was traded to the Kansas City Royals in 2012, and traded again to the Colorado Rockies after he struggled in the first half of the season. He began 2013 with the Pittsburgh Pirates.

== Early life ==
Sánchez attended Blanca Malaret High School in Sabana Grande, Puerto Rico. After graduating in 2000, Sánchez pitched for four seasons at Ohio Dominican University in Columbus, Ohio. While at the university, Sánchez threw four no-hitters and set school records for most strikeouts in a single game (sixteen), most strikeouts in a single season (105), most strikeouts in a career (311), and most shutouts in a career (ten). However, his final collegiate appearance was arguably his worst, as he was saddled with the loss in the Panthers' NAIA regional playoff defeat to Saint Vincent College, going five innings and allowing six runs on six hits.

== Professional career ==
=== Draft and minor leagues ===
Sánchez was selected by the San Francisco Giants in the twenty-seventh round (820th overall) of the 2004 MLB draft. In his first year of professional ball, he went 7–1 with a 3.72 earned run average in fifteen games (nine were starts) with the Rookie league Arizona League Giants and the Single-A (short-season) Salem-Keizer Volcanoes. While pitching in the Arizona League, he tied for third in the league in wins, with five.

Sánchez was promoted to the Single-A Augusta GreenJackets of the South Atlantic League in 2005. He went 5–7 with a 4.08 ERA in twenty-five starts, led the South Atlantic League in strikeouts with 166, averaged 11.9 in nine innings pitched, and was selected to the league's All-star team. During the offseason, Sánchez pitched for the Carolina club of the Puerto Rican Professional Baseball League, posting a 2–2 record with a 2.91 ERA in 19 relief appearances.

Coming into 2006, Sánchez was ranked as the sixth best prospect in the Giants' organization by Baseball America. He began the 2006 season with the Double-A Connecticut Defenders, where in thirteen appearances (three starts) he went 2–1 with a 1.15 ERA and forty-six strikeouts.

=== San Francisco Giants (2006–2011) ===
==== 2006 ====
Sánchez was called up to the Giants on May 26, 2006, as a reliever. He made his MLB debut two days later on May 28 against the Colorado Rockies. He pitched one inning in relief and retired all three batters he faced (Todd Helton, Matt Holliday, and Garrett Atkins). His performance was overshadowed, however, because Barry Bonds hit his 715th home run in the same game to surpass Babe Ruth for second place on the all-time home run list.

On June 4, Sánchez picked up his first major league win. With the score tied at six in the eleventh inning against the New York Mets, Sánchez entered the game and pitched a scoreless inning. The Giants won the game 7–6 in the twelfth on an RBI single by Pedro Feliz.

Sánchez posted a 2–0 record with a 1.37 ERA in twenty-two games in his first stint with the team. On July 29, the Giants sent him to their AAA affiliate, the Fresno Grizzlies to improve his abilities as a starter. While at Fresno, he went 2–2 with a 3.80 ERA in six starts. With the expansion of the MLB rosters on September 1, Sánchez was recalled from Fresno.

Sánchez won his first major league start on September 6 (in place of Noah Lowry, who was injured), giving up one run in 5 2/3 innings pitched in a 3–2 victory over the Cincinnati Reds. After that, Sánchez replaced Brad Hennessey in the rotation. However, Sánchez did not pitch well in his last four appearances of the season (one came in relief), as he had an 11.36 ERA in them.

==== 2007 ====
Entering the 2007 season, Sánchez was ranked as the second best prospect in the Giants' organization (behind only Tim Lincecum) by Baseball America. Sánchez made the Giants' roster out of spring training. He struggled in his first fourteen games, however, and was sent down to Fresno on May 21 when Russ Ortiz came off the disabled list. Sánchez returned to the majors on June 6 when, coincidentally, Ortiz got hurt again. On June 13, he picked up his first major league hit (an RBI double) in a 7–4 loss to the Toronto Blue Jays. On July 4, he was placed on the disabled list with a strained rib cage, but he was reactivated on July 18.

Sánchez was sent back to Fresno on August 11 to make room for Brian Wilson on the roster. He returned in September, and he replaced Lowry (who was injured) in the rotation. He made four starts, but he lost three of them and had a 7.16 ERA in all four of them. After straining his left oblique muscle in his fourth start, he was shut down for the rest of the season and replaced in the rotation by Travis Blackley. He finished the year 1–5 with a 5.88 ERA in thirty-three games (four starts).

==== 2008 ====
In 2008, Sánchez made the Giants' starting rotation out of spring training as the fifth starter. In only his second start of the season, he struck out a career high ten batters against the San Diego Padres in a game the Giants eventually won 1–0. Sánchez struck out ten batters again in a 3–1 victory against the Cincinnati Reds on April 25, becoming the first Giants left-handed pitcher since Shawn Estes to strike out at least ten batters in a game more than once in a season. From May 28 through June 12, Sánchez won a career best four straight starts. On June 12, in a 10–7 victory over the Colorado Rockies, he became the first Giants' starter to allow seven runs and win a game since Russ Ortiz did it in 2000. In his next start, on June 17 against the Detroit Tigers, Sánchez took a no-hitter into the sixth inning, but he was ultimately the losing pitcher in a 5–1 loss. Sánchez finished the first half with an 8–5 record and 115 strikeouts, which were the most ever in the first half of a season by a Giants' left-hander during the Giants' tenure in San Francisco.

The second half did not go well for Sánchez. He lost five straight decisions starting on July 9 before getting placed on the disabled list on August 16. In his last start before going on the disabled list, he no-hit the Houston Astros through five innings. However, he was the losing pitcher in a 3–1 loss. Sánchez returned on September 1, but lost his sixth straight game as the Colorado Rockies prevailed by a score of 4–0. He finally ended his losing streak on September 12, when he was the winning pitcher in a 5–2 win over the San Diego Padres. Sánchez did not win another game all year, though, and he finished the second half of the season with a 1–7 record. Sánchez still finished with a 9–12 record, and he struck out 157 batters in 158 innings.

==== 2009 ====
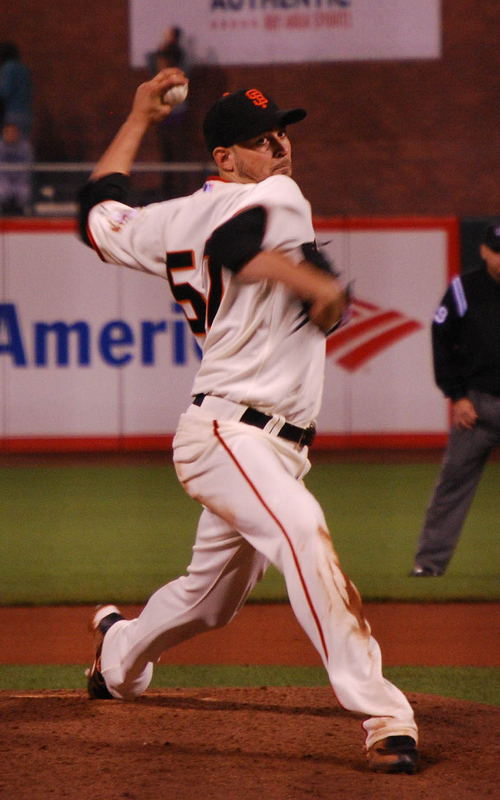
Sánchez with the Giants in August 2009

Sánchez was again the fifth starter in the Giants' rotation in 2009. The season did not start well for him, though, as he had a 2–8 record in the first part of the year. On June 28, Ryan Sadowski replaced him in the rotation.

Sánchez did not stay in the bullpen very long though. After Randy Johnson strained his shoulder, Sánchez was chosen to start against the San Diego Padres on July 10. In that game, Sánchez not only threw the first complete game and the first shutout of his career; he threw a no-hitter, becoming the first Giants' pitcher to do so since John Montefusco no-hit the Atlanta Braves in 1976. In the process, Sánchez struck out a new career high of eleven batters. Sánchez had a perfect game going into the eighth inning, but an error by Juan Uribe off the bat of Chase Headley allowed the only baserunner of the night. Sánchez almost lost the no-hitter during the ninth inning when Edgar Gonzalez hit a ball deep to centerfield. However, Aaron Rowand made a spectacular catch, and Sánchez got his no-hitter. Sánchez's no-hitter was also special because his father Sigfredo, who had never seen his son start a major league game, was in attendance.

The no-hitter proved to be a turning point in Sánchez's season, as he went 6–4 the rest of the way to finish with an 8–12 record. He remained in the rotation for the entire time. Sánchez also struck out 177 batters in 163.1 innings for a 9.75 average per nine innings. This was good for fourth in the National League, behind only Tim Lincecum, Yovani Gallardo, and Javier Vázquez.

==== 2010 ====
Sánchez was arbitration eligible to begin 2010, but he avoided arbitration by signing a one-year contract with the Giants. He was named the fourth starter out of spring training this time. Sánchez began started strong in 2010, as he was 7–6 by the All-Star break. Because of injuries to the Giants' left-handed relief pitchers, Sánchez made his only relief appearance of the year on July 30 in a 6–5 win over the Los Angeles Dodgers. On August 3, Sánchez tied Juan Marichal's record when he struck out seven straight batters in a 10–0 win over the Colorado Rockies. Two months later, on the last day of the season, Sánchez started against the San Diego Padres. Sánchez pitched five shutout innings, scored the first run after hitting a triple in the third inning, and was the winning pitcher in a 3–0 win. The win sent the Giants to the playoffs for the first time since 2003.

In Game three of the 2010 NLDS against the Atlanta Braves, Sánchez struck out eleven batters in a game the Giants won 3–2. Sánchez gave up three runs over six innings in Game two of the 2010 NLCS, but he was the losing pitcher in a 6–1 loss. Sánchez also started Game six. He only lasted two innings, giving up two runs and getting pulled from the game after an argument with Chase Utley. However, the Giants won the game 3–2 and returned to the World Series. Sánchez's only World Series game was unsuccessful, as he gave up all four runs in 4.2 innings in the Giants' 4–2 loss to the Texas Rangers in Game three. However, the Giants ultimately won the World Series for the first time in fifty-six years.

Sánchez was arbitration-eligible following the season, but the Giants avoided arbitration with him by signing him to a one-year contract.

==== 2011 ====
Sánchez started the season second in the Giants' rotation, as to split the righties Lincecum and Cain, as well as to split the lefties Sánchez, Zito, and Bumgarner. He did not fare well early in the season, and was placed on the disabled list shortly before Barry Zito was activated in June. When Sánchez returned from the disabled list, he was still experiencing the control problems that had plagued him before he was injured. Sánchez sprained his foot in August while on the road in Atlanta, and remained on the disabled list until the end of the season, ending with a line of 4–7 W/L; 4.26 ERA; 101.1 IP; 102 Ks; 66 BBs; .220 Opp AVG; and a WHIP of 1.44.

=== Kansas City Royals (2012) ===
On November 7, 2011, Sánchez was traded to the Kansas City Royals with prospect Ryan Verdugo for outfielder Melky Cabrera. He struggled with the Royals, pitching to a 1-6 record and 7.76 ERA in 53 1/3 innings, while allowing 65 hits, including eight home runs, and 44 walks. After allowing seven runs on seven hits and one walk in 1 1/3 innings in a start against the Seattle Mariners, the Royals designated Sánchez for assignment on July 17, 2012.

=== Colorado Rockies (2012) ===
The Royals traded Sánchez to the Colorado Rockies for Jeremy Guthrie on July 20. He only made 3 starts for the Rockies and was 0-3 with a 9.53 ERA. He became a free agent following the season.

=== Pittsburgh Pirates (2013) ===
On February 6, 2013, Sánchez signed a minor league contract with the Pittsburgh Pirates. The deal included an invitation to spring training. On March 27, Sánchez had his contract selected after being named to the team's Opening Day rotation. On April 26, he was ejected for the first time in his MLB career by umpire Tim Timmons after intentionally pitching at St. Louis Cardinals batter Allen Craig following back-to-back home runs by Matt Carpenter and Carlos Beltrán and a single by Matt Holliday. After posting an 11.85 ERA with the Pirates, he was designated for assignment on April 30, and was later released on May 8.

=== Los Angeles Dodgers ===
On May 13, 2013, Sánchez signed a minor league contract with the Los Angeles Dodgers. After spending a month at the Dodgers extended spring training location in Arizona, Sánchez joined the Triple-A Albuquerque Isotopes on June 24. He made 14 starts and was 7-3 with a 5.13 ERA. He elected free agency on November 4.

=== Chicago Cubs ===
On December 18, 2013, Sánchez signed a minor league deal with the Chicago Cubs. He was released on July 2, 2014.

=== Cincinnati Reds ===
On January 29, 2016, Sánchez signed a minor league deal with the Cincinnati Reds. He was released on March 18.

=== Kansas City Royals (second stint) ===
On December 17, 2016, Sánchez signed a minor league contract with the Kansas City Royals. He was released on March 20, 2017.

=== York Revolution ===
On June 30, 2018, Sánchez signed with the York Revolution of the Atlantic League of Professional Baseball. He made six starts for York, registering an 0-1 record and 4.43 ERA with 19 strikeouts across 22 1/3 innings pitched. Sánchez retired from professional baseball on August 6.

=== Saraperos de Saltillo ===
On April 4, 2019, Sánchez came out of retirement and signed with the Saraperos de Saltillo of the Mexican League. He made 22 appearances (20 starts) for Saltillo, compiling an 8-6 record and 5.20 ERA with 102 strikeouts over 109 innings of work. Sánchez became a free agent following the season.

== International play ==
Sánchez was chosen to pitch for Puerto Rico in the 2009 World Baseball Classic. He made two starts in the Classic. He won the first one on March 11 by pitching four scoreless innings in a 5–0 victory over the Netherlands. Although he only pitched 2 2/3 innings and gave up three runs in his next start against the United States, he was in line for the win going into the ninth inning. However, J. C. Romero and Fernando Cabrera blew the lead, and the United States knocked Puerto Rico out of the Classic with a 6–5 victory.

== Pitch repertoire ==
Sánchez throws a fastball that travels about ninety-one mph for his main pitch, though it sometimes can go up to ninety-five mph. His other pitches (slurve and change-up) travel in the low eighties. Wildness has been a problem for Sánchez; he has walked 10% – 15% of major-league batters faced each season. However, he also strikes out a lot of batters; he struck out two hundred for the first time in his career in 2010. That year, he led all qualifying MLB starting pitchers in limiting hits per innings pitched (6.61 H/9), and his career swinging-strike percentage is among the best in the majors.

== See also ==
- List of Major League Baseball players from Puerto Rico

Preceded by Carlos Zambrano	No-hitter pitcher July 10, 2009	Succeeded by Mark Buehrle
Preceded by Clayton Kershaw	NL opponent batting average 2010	Succeeded by Clayton Kershaw
