= Ryan Sadowski =

American baseball player

- Starting pitcher
- Born: October 4, 1982 (age 43); Miami, Florida, U.S.
- Batted: Right Threw: Right

Professional debut
- MLB: June 28, 2009, for the San Francisco Giants
- KBO: 2010, for the Lotte Giants

Last appearance
- MLB: July 31, 2009, for the San Francisco Giants
- KBO: 2012, for the Lotte Giants

MLB statistics
- Win–loss record: 2–4
- Earned run average: 4.45
- Strikeouts: 17

KBO statistics
- Win–loss record: 29–24
- Earned run average: 4.03
- Strikeouts: 297
- Stats at Baseball Reference

Teams
- Player: San Francisco Giants (2009); Lotte Giants (2010–2012); Coach: Lotte Giants (2015–current) (International Scout)

Ryan Keith Sadowski (born October 4, 1982) is an American former professional baseball pitcher. He played in Major League Baseball (MLB) for the San Francisco Giants and in Korea Baseball Organization (KBO) for the Lotte Giants. He is currently the Director of International Scouting for the Lotte Giants.

== Early life ==
Sadowski is the son of Elaine and Arnold Sadowski, and is Jewish. He was born in Miami, Florida.

== Baseball career ==
He attended Western High School in Davie, Florida, graduating in 2000. He pitched a 2-hitter against Columbus H.S. (the top ranked team in the nation), and Baseball America ranked him the country's # 34 high school prospect. He then attended the University of Florida, where he pitched for the Florida Gators. He was selected by the Giants in the 13th round (397 overall) of the 2002 Major League Baseball draft.

Sadowski made his MLB debut with a win over the Milwaukee Brewers on June 28, 2009, replacing Jonathan Sánchez in the Giants' starting rotation. He pitched 13 shutout innings in winning his first two starts.

After signing a minor league deal with the Houston Astros in December 2009, Sadowski signed with the Lotte Giants of the Korea Baseball Association (KBO), Korea's highest league. He played for the team for three years.

On December 10, 2012, Sadowski signed a minor league contract to return to the San Francisco Giants organization for the 2013 season. He was invited to the Giants spring training camp in March 2014. On March 5, 2014, the Los Angeles Dodgers signed him to a minor league deal.

After a lengthy attempt to rehab an injury, Sadowski decided to retire. He has since focused on scouting for the KBO and also has been working on assisting U.S. players with the transition to playing in Korea.

== See also ==
- List of Florida Gators baseball players
- List of Jewish Major League Baseball players
