= 2009 Atlanta Braves season =

2009 Atlanta Braves
- League: National League
- Division: East
- Ballpark: Turner Field
- City: Atlanta
- Record: 86–76 (.531)
- Divisional place: 3rd
- Owners: Liberty Media
- General managers: Frank Wren
- Managers: Bobby Cox
- Television: SportSouth; Fox Sports South; Peachtree TV; Chip Caray, Joe Simpson, Jon Sciambi
- Radio: Atlanta Braves Radio Network; Jim Powell, Don Sutton, Mark Lemke, Jon Sciambi

The 2009 Atlanta Braves season was the 44th season in Atlanta and the 139th overall. The Braves were once again skippered by Bobby Cox, then in his 24th season managing the team. It was the Braves' 44th season in Atlanta, and the 138th season overall for the franchise.

== Preseason transactions ==
=== Notable free agent acquisitions ===
Player	Former Team	Contract Terms
Derek Lowe (RHP)	L.A. Dodgers	4 years/$60M
Kenshin Kawakami (RHP)	Chunichi Dragons (NPB)	3 years/$23M
Garret Anderson (OF)	L.A. Angeles of Anaheim	1 year/$2.5M
David Ross (C)	Boston Red Sox	2 years/$3M

=== Notable players lost to free agency ===
Player	New Team
John Smoltz (RHP)	Boston Red Sox
Mike Hampton (LHP)	Houston Astros
Corky Miller (C)	Chicago White Sox
Julián Tavárez (RHP)	Washington Nationals
Chuck James (LHP)	FREE AGENT

- Source: Baseball-Reference.com 2009 Atlanta Braves Trades and Transactions

=== Pre-season trades ===
December 4, 2008	to Chicago White Sox (IF) Brent Lillibridge & Minor League prospects Tyler Flowers, Jon Gilmore & Santos Rodriguez	to Atlanta Braves (P) Javier Vázquez & (P) Boone Logan

== Regular season ==
=== Season standings ===
NL East
Team	W	L	Pct.	GB	Home	Road
Philadelphia Phillies	93	69	.574	—	45‍–‍36	48‍–‍33
Florida Marlins	87	75	.537	6	43‍–‍38	44‍–‍37
Atlanta Braves	86	76	.531	7	40‍–‍41	46‍–‍35
New York Mets	70	92	.432	23	41‍–‍40	29‍–‍52
Washington Nationals	59	103	.364	34	33‍–‍48	26‍–‍55

=== Record vs. opponents ===
2009 National League record Source: MLB Standings Grid – 2009
Team	AZ	ATL	CHC	CIN	COL	FLA	HOU	LAD	MIL	NYM	PHI	PIT	SD	SF	STL	WAS	AL
Arizona	–	3–4	4-2	1–5	7-11	5–3	5–4	7-11	2–5	5–2	1–5	6–1	11-7	5-13	2–4	1–5	5–10
Atlanta	4–3	–	4–2	3–6	4–4	8-10	3-3	4–3	3–3	13–5	10-8	3–4	3–3	3–4	4–2	10-8	7–8
Chicago	2-4	2–4	–	10-5	2–4	4–3	11–6	3–5	10-7	3-3	1–5	10-4	4–5	4-2	6-10	5–2	6–9
Cincinnati	5-1	6-3	5-10	–	0-7	3-3	12-4	1-5	8-7	2-4	2-5	13-5	1-6	3-3	8-8	3-4	6-9
Colorado	11-7	4-4	4-2	7-0	–	2-4	2-5	4-14	6-0	3-4	2-4	6-3	10-8	8-10	6-1	6-0	11-4
Florida	3-5	10-8	3-4	3-3	4-2	–	4–3	3-3	3-4	11-7	9-9	2-4	4-2	3-4	3-3	12-6	10-8
Houston	4–5	3-3	6-11	4-12	5-2	3-4	–	4–3	5-10	1-5	6-2	10-5	6-1	2-4	6-9	3-3	6-9
Los Angeles	11-7	3-4	5-3	5-1	14-4	3-3	3-4	–	3–3	5-1	4-3	4-3	10-8	11-7	2-5	3-2	9-9
Milwaukee	5-2	3-3	7-10	7-8	0-6	4-3	10-5	3-3	–	3-3	4-3	9-5	2-4	4-5	9-9	5-3	5-10
New York	2-5	5-13	3-3	4-2	4-3	7-11	5-1	1-5	3-3	–	6-12	4-3	2-5	5-3	4-5	10-8	5–10
Philadelphia	5-1	8-10	5-1	5-2	4-2	9-9	2-6	3-4	3-4	12-6	–	4-2	5-2	3-4	4-1	15-3	6-12
Pittsburgh	1-6	4-3	4-10	5-13	3-6	4-2	5-10	3-4	5-9	3-4	2-4	–	3-4	2-4	5-10	5-3	8–7
San Diego	7-11	3-3	5-4	6-1	8-10	2-4	1-6	8-10	4-2	5-2	2-5	4-3	–	10-8	1-6	4-2	5–10
San Francisco	13-5	4–3	2–4	3–3	10-8	4–3	4–2	7-11	5-4	3–5	4–3	4–2	8-10	–	4–3	4–2	9–6
St. Louis	4-2	2-4	10-6	8-8	1-6	3-3	9-6	5-2	9-9	5-4	1-4	10-5	6-1	3-4	–	6–1	9–6
Washington	5-1	8-10	2-5	4-3	0-6	6-12	3-3	2-3	3-5	8-10	3-15	3-5	2-4	2-4	1-6	–	7–11

=== Game log ===
2009 Regular Season game log
April (10–11)

#	Date	Time	Opponent	Score	Win	Loss	Save	Attendance	Record
1	April 5	@ Phillies	4–1	Lowe (1–0)	Myers (0–1)		2:22	44,532	1–0
2	April 7	@ Phillies	4–0	Jurrjens (1–0)	Moyer (0–1)		2:36	44,178	2–0
3	April 8	@ Phillies	11–12	Condrey (1–0)	Boyer (0–1)	Lidge (1)	3:13	44,939	2–1
4	April 10	Nationals	6–5 (10)	Campillo (1–0)	Beimel (0–1)		3:58	48,327	3–1
5	April 11	Nationals	5–3	Kawakami (1–0)	Lannan (0–2)	González (1)	2:33	34,325	4–1
6	April 12	Nationals	8–5	Jurrjens (2–0)	Olsen (0–2)	Soriano (1)	2:47	19,873	5–1
7	April 14	Marlins	1–5	Volstad (2–0)	Vázquez (0–1)		2:31	16,293	5–2
8	April 15	Marlins	4–10	Penn (1–0)	Moylan (0–1)		3:07	19,204	5–3
9	April 16	Marlins	2–6	Sánchez (1–0)	Kawakami (1–1)		2:49	21,072	5–4
10	April 17	@ Pirates	0–3	Maholm (2–0)	Jurrjens (2–1)	Capps (3)	2:36	15,659	5–5
11	April 18	@ Pirates	0–10	Snell (1–2)	Reyes (0–1)		2:22	20,755	5–6
12	April 19	@ Pirates	11–1	Vázquez (1–1)	Duke (2–1)		2:48	14,776	6–6
13	April 20	@ Nationals	2–3	Zimmermann (1–0)	Lowe (1–1)	Hanrahan (1)	2:24	12,473	6–7
14	April 21	@ Nationals	3–4	Martis (2–0)	Kawakami (1–2)	Hanrahan (2)	2:47	15,439	6–8
15	April 22	@ Nationals	1–0	González (1–0)	Mock (0–1)	Soriano (2)	2:30	15,567	7–8
16	April 24	@ Reds	4–3	Vázquez (2–1)	Vólquez (2–2)	González (2)	3:30	30,060	8–8
17	April 25	@ Reds	10–2	Lowe (2–1)	Arroyo (3–1)		2:38	33,015	9–8
18	April 26	@ Reds	2–8	Owings (1–2)	Kawakami (1–3)		2:36	29,327	9–9
19	April 27	Cardinals	2–3	Piñeiro (4–0)	Jurrjens (2–2)	Franklin (6)	2:46	16,739	9–10
20	April 28	Cardinals	2–1	Moylan (1–1)	McClellan (1–1)	González (3)	2:23	18,121	10–10
21	April 29	Cardinals	3–5	Wainwright (3–0)	Vázquez (2–2)	Franklin (7)	2:49	19,127	10–11

May (15–14)

#	Date	Time	Opponent	Score	Win	Loss	Save	Attendance	Record
22	May 1	Astros	7–2	Lowe (3–1)	Hampton (1–2)		2:47	29,309	11–11
23	May 2	Astros	1–5	Byrdak (1–0)	Carlyle (0–1)		2:48	28,203	11–12
24	May 3	Astros	5–7	Geary (1–3)	Moylan (1–2)	Hawkins (3)	3:18	27,921	11–13
25	May 4	Mets	4–6	Maine (2–2)	Vázquez (2–3)	Rodríguez (6)	2:42	19,132	11–14
26	May 5	Mets	3–4	Hernández (2–1)	Kawakami (1–4)	Rodríguez (7)	3:13	21,049	11–15
27	May 6	@ Marlins	8–6	Lowe (4–1)	Taylor (0–2)	González (4)	3:09	12,725	12–15
28	May 7	@ Marlins	4–2	Jurrjens (3–2)	Sánchez (1–4)	González (5)	2:46	17,759	13–15
29	May 8	@ Phillies	6–10	Hamels (1–2)	Reyes (0–2)		2:29	45,312	13–16
30	May 9	@ Phillies	6–2	Vázquez (3–3)	Blanton (1–3)		2:29	45,339	14–16
31	May 10	@ Phillies	4–2	Kawakami (2–4)	Taschner (1–1)	Soriano (3)	2:50	45,343	15–16
32	May 11	@ Mets	8–3	Lowe (5–1)	Santana (4–2)		3:04	40,497	16–16
33	May 12	@ Mets	3–4 (10)	Rodríguez (1–0)	Bennett (0–1)		3:02	39,408	16–17
34	May 13	@ Mets	8–7 (12)	Bennett (1–1)	Takahashi (0–1)	González (6)	3:46	40,555	17–17
35	May 15	Diamondbacks	4–3	González (2–0)	Peña (3–1)		2:50	32,593	18–17
36	May 16	Diamondbacks	0–12	Scherzer (1–3)	Kawakami (2–5)		3:10	30,162	18–18
–	May 17	Diamondbacks	Rescheduled for August 17						18–18
38	May 18	Rockies	1–5	Marquis (5–3)	Lowe (5–2)		2:30	15,364	18–19
39	May 19	Rockies	8–1	Jurrjens (4–2)	Hammel (0–3)		2:46	16,749	19–19
40	May 20	Rockies	12–4	Vázquez (4–3)	de la Rosa (0–4)		3:17	19,259	20–19
41	May 21	Rockies	0–9	Cook (3–1)	Medlen (0–1)		2:35	25,481	20–20
42	May 22	Blue Jays	1–0	Kawakami (3–5)	Carlson (1–3)	González (7)	2:19	21,533	21–20
43	May 23	Blue Jays	4–3	Lowe (6–2)	Janssen (0–1)	Soriano (4)	2:31	27,377	22–20
44	May 24	Blue Jays	10–2	Bennett (2–1)	Camp (0–2)		2:59	23,971	23–20
45	May 25	@ Giants	2–8	Sánchez (2–4)	Vázquez (4–4)		3:04	40,034	23–21
46	May 26	@ Giants	0–4	Lincecum (4–1)	Medlen (0–2)		2:08	29,485	23–22
47	May 27	@ Giants	3–6	Johnson (4–4)	Kawakami (3–6)	Wilson (10)	2:59	27,744	23–23
48	May 28	@ Diamondbacks	2–5	Haren (4–4)	Lowe (6–3)	Qualls (12)	2:20	19,452	23–24
49	May 29	@ Diamondbacks	10–6	Jurrjens (5–2)	Garland (4–4)		3:10	26,146	24–24
50	May 30	@ Diamondbacks	2–3 (11)	Peña (5–2)	Bennett (2–2)		3:06	35,039	24–25
51	May 31	@ Diamondbacks	9–3	Medlen (1–2)	Scherzer (2–4)		2:56	30,020	25–25

June (11–15)

#	Date	Time	Opponent	Score	Win	Loss	Save	Attendance	Record
52	June 2	Cubs	6–5(12)	Soriano (1–0)	Heilman (2–3)		3:39	30,262	26–25
53	June 3	Cubs	2–3 (11)	Guzmán (2–0)	Bennett (2–3)	Gregg (9)	3:19	30,646	26–26
–	June 4	Cubs	Rescheduled for June 22						26–26
55	June 5	Brewers	0–4	Gallardo (6–2)	Jurrjens (5–3)		2:23	23,327	26–27
56	June 6	Brewers	0–3	Suppan (4–4)	Vázquez (4–5)	Hoffman (15)	2:57	32,721	26–28
57	June 7	Brewers	8–7	O'Flaherty (1–0)	Villanueva (2–4)	González (8)	2:49	33,428	27–28
58	June 8	Pirates	7–6 (15)	Medlen (2–2)	Karstens (2–4)		4:46	21,856	28–28
59	June 9	Pirates	4–3	Lowe (7–3)	Burnett (1–2)	Soriano (5)	2:35	20,124	29–28
60	June 10	Pirates	2–3	Karstens (3–4)	Jurrjens (5–4)	Capps (14)	2:42	21,610	29–29
61	June 11	Pirates	1–3	Jackson (2–1)	Soriano (1–1)	Capps (15)	2:37	29,331	29–30
62	June 12	@ Orioles	7–2	Hanson (1–0)	Berken (1–3)		3:15	28,469	30–30
63	June 13	@ Orioles	4–8	Bass (4–1)	O'Flaherty (1–1)		3:07	29,645	30–31
64	June 14	@ Orioles	2–11	Bergesen (4–2)	Lowe (7–4)		2:42	26,770	30–32
65	June 16	@ Reds	2–7	Herrera (1–2)	Jurrjens (5–5)		2:53	19,127	30–33
66	June 17	@ Reds	3–4	Owings (4–7)	Vázquez (4–6)	Cordero (16)	2:44	27,455	30–34
67	June 18	@ Reds	7–0	Hanson (2–0)	Maloney (0–2)		3:15	24,657	31–34
68	June 19	@ Red Sox	8–2	Kawakami (4–6)	Matsuzaka (1–5)		2:49	37,703	32–34
69	June 20	@ Red Sox	0–3	Beckett (8–3)	Lowe (7–5)		2:11	38,029	32–35
70	June 21	@ Red Sox	5–6	Papelbon (1–1)	Bennett (2–4)		2:47	37,243	32–36
54	June 22	Cubs	2–0	Vázquez (5–6)	Dempster (4–5)	Soriano (6)	2:58	31,701	33–36
71	June 23	Yankees	4–0	Hanson (3–0)	Wang (0–6)		2:47	40,828	34–36
72	June 24	Yankees	4–8	Chamberlain (4–2)	Medlen (2–3)	Rivera (16)	3:16	42,315	34–37
73	June 25	Yankees	7–11	Aceves (5–1)	Lowe (7–6)	Rivera (17)	3:49	47,508	34–38
74	June 26	Red Sox	1–4	Beckett (9–3)	Jurrjens (5–6)		2:46	48,418	34–39
75	June 27	Red Sox	0–1	Wakefield (10–3)	Vázquez (5–7)	Papelbon (18)	2:46	48,151	34–40
76	June 28	Red Sox	2–1	Hanson (4–0)	Penny (6–3)	Gonzalez (9)	3:01	41,463	35–40
77	June 30	Phillies	5–4 (10)	Moylan (2–2)	Park (3–2)		3:14	31,818	36–40

July (16–11)

#	Date	Time	Opponent	Score	Win	Loss	Save	Attendance	Record
78	July 1	Phillies	11–1	Jurrjens (6–6)	Hamels (4–5)		2:32	25,212	37–40
79	July 2	Phillies	5–2	Gonzalez (3–0)	Madson (2–4)	Soriano (7)	3:08	38,254	38–40
80	July 3	@ Nationals	9–8	Logan (1–0)	Colomé (1–1)	Soriano (8)	3:28	33,982	39–40
81	July 4	@ Nationals	3–5	Lannan (6–5)	Gonzalez (3–1)	MacDougal (4)	2:34	23,708	39–41
82	July 5	@ Nationals	3–5	Olsen (2–4)	Lowe (7–7)	MacDougal (5)	2:39	22,677	39–42
83	July 6	@ Cubs	2–4	Wells (4–3)	Jurrjens (6–7)	Gregg (15)	2:30	40,042	39–43
84	July 7	@ Cubs	2–1	Vázquez (6–7)	Zambrano (4–4)	Soriano (9)	2:44	40,359	40–43
85	July 8	@ Cubs	4–1	Kawakami (5–6)	Hart (0–1)	Soriano (10)	2:50	40,531	41–43
86	July 9	@ Rockies	6–7	Rincón (2–0)	Gonzalez (3–2)	Street (22)	3:11	30,392	41–44
87	July 10	@ Rockies	4–1	Lowe (8–7)	Jiménez (6–9)	Soriano (11)	2:40	35,238	42–44
88	July 11	@ Rockies	4–3	Jurrjens (7–7)	Marquis (11–6)	Soriano (12)	2:51	38,065	43–44
89	July 12	@ Rockies	7–8	Street (3–1)	Valdez (0–1)		3:15	33,825	43–45
–	July 14	2009 Major League Baseball All-Star Game in St. Louis, Missouri							
90	July 16	Mets	5–3	Acosta (1–0)	Feliciano (2–3)	Soriano (13)	2:57	32,736	44–45
91	July 17	Mets	11–0	Jurrjens (8–7)	Pelfrey (7–5)		2:38	50,704	45–45
92	July 18	Mets	1–5	Santana (11–7)	Kawakami (5–7)		3:22	51,175	45–46
93	July 19	Mets	7–1	Vázquez (7–7)	Redding (1–4)		2:47	34,293	46–46
94	July 20	Giants	11–3	Hanson (5–0)	Romo (2–1)		2:50	21,988	47–46
95	July 21	Giants	8–1	Lowe (9–7)	Sadowski (2–2)		2:41	25,135	48–46
96	July 22	Giants	4–2	Jurrjens (9–7)	Lincecum (10–3)	Soriano (14)	2:28	34,672	49–46
97	July 23	Giants	1–5	Zito (6–10)	Gonzalez (3–3)		2:58	31,727	49–47
98	July 24	@ Brewers	9–4	Vázquez (8–7)	Villanueva (2–7)		3:25	41,941	50–47
99	July 25	@ Brewers	0–4	Gollardo (9–7)	Hanson (5–1)		2:56	43,565	50–48
100	July 26	@ Brewers	10–2	Lowe (10–7)	Looper (9–5)		2:47	43,471	51–48
101	July 28	@ Marlins	3–4	Núñez (3–3)	Soriano (1–2)		2:48	13,128	51–49
102	July 29	@ Marlins	3–6	Johnson (10–2)	Kawakami (5–8)	Núñez (8)	2:48	13,518	51–50
103	July 30	@ Marlins	6–3 (10)	Moylan (3–2)	Ayala (1–3)	Soriano (15)	3:16	14,226	52–50
104	July 31	Dodgers	0–5	Schmidt (2–1)	Hanson (5–2)		2:53	45,225	52–51

August (17–11)

#	Date	Time	Opponent	Score	Win	Loss	Save	Attendance	Record
105	August 1	Dodgers	4–3	Lowe (11–7)	Wolf (5–6)	Soriano (16)	2:41	49,843	53–51
106	August 2	Dodgers	1–9	Billingsley (11–6)	Jurrjens (9–8)		3:22	37,654	53–52
107	August 3	@ Padres	2–4	Latos (3–1)	Kawakami (5–9)	Bell (27)	2:33	20,423	53–53
108	August 4	@ Padres	9–2	Vázquez (9–7)	Stauffer (1–3)		2:52	17,916	54–53
109	August 5	@ Padres	6–2	Hanson (6–2)	Gaudin (4–10)		2:52	21,816	55–53
110	August 6	@ Dodgers	4–5	Elbert (2–0)	Soriano (1–3)		3:13	46,399	55–54
111	August 7	@ Dodgers	9–5 (12)	Moylan (4–2)	Troncoso (4–1)		4:20	53,184	56–54
112	August 8	@ Dodgers	2–1 (10)	Medlen (3–3)	Mota (3–3)	Soriano (17)	3:31	53,338	57–54
113	August 9	@ Dodgers	8–2	Vázquez (10–7)	Stults (4–3)		2:53	45,438	58–54
114	August 11	Nationals	8–1	Hanson (7–2)	Lannan (8–9)		3:01	19,273	59–54
115	August 12	Nationals	6–2	Lowe (12–7)	Sosa (1–1)		2:34	17,886	60–54
116	August 14	Phillies	2–3	Madson (4–4)	Soriano (1–4)	Lidge (22)	2:21	37,639	60–55
117	August 15	Phillies	4–3	Moylan (5–2)	Lidge (0–5)		2:54	44,043	61–55
118	August 16	Phillies	1–4	Happ (9–2)	Vázquez (10–8)	Lidge (23)	2:45	25,215	61–56
37	August 17	Diamondbacks	9–4	Hanson (8–2)	Scherzer (7–7)		2:45	23,668	62–56
119	August 18	@ Mets	4–9	Pérez (3–3)	Lowe (12–8)		2:52	38,613	62–57
120	August 19	@ Mets	14–2	Jurrjens (10–8)	Parnell (3–5)		2:54	38,602	63–57
121	August 20	@ Mets	3–2	Kawakami (6–9)	Santana (13–9)	Soriano (18)	2:41	39,105	64–57
122	August 21	Marlins	3–5	Sánchez (2–4)	Vázquez (10–9)	Núñez (14)	2:48	22,608	64–58
123	August 22	Marlins	4–3	Hanson (9–2)	Volstad (9–10)	Soriano (19)	2:47	35,200	65–58
124	August 23	Marlins	7–5	Moylan (6–2)	Calero (2–2)	Soriano (20)	3:04	30,478	66–58
125	August 25	Padres	1–2 (12)	Thatcher (1–0)	Medlen (3–4)	Mujica (2)	3:43	15,389	66–59
126	August 26	Padres	5–12	Stauffer (2–6)	Kawakami (6–10)		3:23	15,619	66–60
127	August 27	Padres	9–1	Vázquez (11–9)	Richard (7–4)		2:50	18,651	67–60
128	August 28	@ Phillies	2–4	Moyer (12–9)	Hanson (9–3)	Lidge (26)	2:24	44,747	67–61
129	August 29	@ Phillies	9–1 (8)	Lowe (13–8)	Lee (12–10)		2:46	45,134	68–61
130	August 30	@ Phillies	2–3	Blanton (9–6)	Jurrjens (10–9)	Lidge (27)	2:27	44,828	68–62
131	August 31	@ Marlins	5–2	Kawakami (7–10)	Johnson (13–4)		2:38	12,244	69–62

September (17–10)

#	Date	Time	Opponent	Score	Win	Loss	Save	Attendance	Record
132	September 1	@ Marlins	4–3	Hudson (1–0)	Sánchez (2–6)	Soriano (21)	3:02	14,024	70–62
133	September 2	@ Marlins	7–8	Núñez (4–4)	Gonzalez (3–4)		3:40	14,723	70–63
134	September 3	@ Marlins	3–8	Nolasco (10–8)	Medlen (3–5)		3:13	13,711	70–64
135	September 4	Reds	1–3	Arroyo (12–12)	Lowe (13–9)		2:25	24,219	70–65
136	September 5	Reds	1–3	Wells (1–3)	Jurrjens (10–10)		2:40	29,078	70–66
137	September 6	Reds	2–4	Owings (7–12)	Kawakami (7–11)		3:39	32,397	70–67
138	September 8	@ Astros	2–1	Vázquez (12–9)	Paulino (2–8)	Soriano (22)	2:33	26,081	71–67
139	September 9	@ Astros	1–2	Valverde (4–2)	Soriano (1–5)		2:13	22,392	71–68
140	September 10	@ Astros	9–7	Lowe (14–9)	Oswalt (8–6)	Gonzalez (10)	3:11	26,552	72–68
141	September 11	@ Cardinals	1–0	Jurrjens (11–10)	Piñeiro (14–10)	Soriano (23)	2:34	43,984	73–68
142	September 12	@ Cardinals	7–6	Gonzalez (4–4)	Franklin (2–3)	Soriano (24)	3:13	43,869	74–68
143	September 13	@ Cardinals	9–2	Vázquez (13–9)	Carpenter (16–4)		2:08	41,179	75–68
144	September 15	Mets	6–0	Hanson (10–3)	Misch (1–3)		2:27	25,094	76–68
145	September 16	Mets	6–5	O'Flaherty (2–1)	Rodríguez (3–5)		3:32	17,988	77–68
146	September 17	Mets	7–3	Jurrjens (12–10)	Figueroa (2–6)		2:22	20,192	78–68
147	September 18	Phillies	4–9	Kendrick (2–1)	Hudson (1–1)		2:57	27,241	78–69
148	September 19	Phillies	6–4	Vázquez (14–9)	Martínez (5–1)		2:43	35,818	79–69
149	September 20	Phillies	2–4	Walker (2–0)	Hanson (10–4)	Lidge (31)	2:46	29,452	79–70
150	September 21	@ Mets	11–3	Lowe (15–9)	Misch (1–4)	Kawakami (1)	2:32	37,706	80–70
151	September 22	@ Mets	3–1	Jurrjens (13–10)	Figueroa (2–7)	Soriano (25)	2:46	37,823	81–70
152	September 23	@ Mets	5–2	Hudson (2–1)	Pelfrey (10–12)	Soriano (26)	3:18	38,266	82–70
153	September 25	@ Nationals	4–1	Vázquez (15–9)	Lannan (9–13)		2:27	28,276	83–70
154	September 26	@ Nationals	11–5	Hanson (11–4)	Mock (3–10)		2:48	29,058	84–70
155	September 27	@ Nationals	6–3 (10)	Gonzalez (5–4)	MacDougal (1–1)	Soriano (27)	2:55	27,840	85–70
156	September 28	Marlins	4–0	Jurrjens (14–10)	Sánchez (3–8)		2:37	25,046	86–70
157	September 29	Marlins	4–5	Pinto (4–1)	Kawakami (7–12)	Núñez (25)	3:20	28,669	86–71
158	September 30	Marlins	4–5	Nolasco (13–9)	Vázquez (15–10)	Donnelly (2)	3:00	31,513	86–72

October (0–4)

#	Date	Time	Opponent	Score	Win	Loss	Save	Attendance	Record
159	October 1	Nationals	1–2	Clippard (4–2)	Soriano (1–6)	MacDougal (19)	2:47	38,237	86–73
160	October 2	Nationals	0–6	Hernández (9–12)	Lowe (15–10)	MacDougal (20)	2:56	33,124	86–74
161	October 3	Nationals	4–6 (11)	Segovia (1–0)	Acosta (1–1)	Kensing (1)	3:16	28,278	86–75
162	October 4	Nationals	1–2 (15)	Kensing (1–2)	Logan (1–1)		4:18	36,307	86–76

- Braves Win
- Braves Loss
- Game Postponed

=== Roster ===
2009 Atlanta Braves
Roster
Pitchers: 46 Manny Acosta; 47 Jeff Bennett; 56 Blaine Boyer; 57 Jorge Campillo; 38 Buddy Carlyle; 51 Mike Gonzalez; 48 Tommy Hanson; 15 Tim Hudson; 49 Jair Jurrjens; 11 Kenshin Kawakami; 36 Boone Logan; 32 Derek Lowe; 54 Kris Medlen; 58 Peter Moylan; 56 Vladimir Núñez; 34 Eric O'Flaherty; 40 James Parr; 37 Jo-Jo Reyes; 39 Rafael Soriano; 50 Luis Valdez; 33 Javier Vázquez	Catchers: 16 Brian McCann; 8 Dave Ross; 5 Clint Sammons; Infielders: 25 Barbaro Canizares; 26 Brooks Conrad; 19 Yunel Escobar; 27 Diory Hernández; 4 Omar Infante; 2 Kelly Johnson; 10 Chipper Jones; 22 Casey Kotchman; 22 Adam LaRoche; 20 Greg Norton; 14 Martín Prado; Outfielders: 18 Garret Anderson; 26 Brian Barton; 1 Gregor Blanco; 25 Ryan Church; 23 Matt Diaz; 7 Jeff Francoeur; 30 Reid Gorecki; 28 Brandon Jones; 13 Nate McLouth; 24 Jordan Schafer	Manager: 6 Bobby Cox; Coaches: 52 Chino Cadahia (bench); 17 Glenn Hubbard (first base); 45 Roger McDowell (pitching); 9 Terry Pendleton (hitting); 12 Eddie Pérez (bullpen); 43 Brian Snitker (third base)

==== Mid-season trades ====
June 3, 2009	to Pittsburgh Pirates Minor League prospects (OF) Gorkys Hernández, (P) Charlie Morton & (P) Jeff Locke	to Atlanta Braves (OF) Nate McLouth
July 10, 2009	to New York Mets (OF) Jeff Francoeur & Cash	to Atlanta Braves (OF) Ryan Church
July 31, 2009	to Boston Red Sox (1B) Casey Kotchman	to Atlanta Braves (1B) Adam LaRoche & Cash

== Player stats ==
=== Most games at position ===
Note: Pos = Position; GP = Games Played

Pos	Player	GP
C	Brian McCann	127
1B	Casey Kotchman ×	85
2B	Kelly Johnson	84
SS	Yunel Escobar ×	139
3B	Chipper Jones	133
LF	Garret Anderson ×	124
CF	Nate McLouth †	84
RF	Jeff Francoeur ×	80

As of October 4, 2009

- Source: ESPN.com-Atlanta Braves Lineup-Games By Position
- × = No longer with team
- † = On DL

=== Batting ===
Note: G = Games played; AB = At bats; R = Runs scored; H = Hits; 2B = Doubles; 3B = Triples; HR = Home runs; RBI = Runs batted in; AVG = Batting average; SB = Stolen bases

Player	G	AB	R	H	2B	3B	HR	RBI	AVG	SB
18 Garret Anderson	135	496	52	133	27	0	13	61	.268	1
26 Brian Barton	1	0	0	0	0	0	0	0	.---	0
1 Gregor Blanco #	24	43	5	8	0	1	0	1	.186	2
25 Barbaro Canizares #	5	21	1	4	1	0	0	0	.190	0
25 Ryan Church *	44	127	20	33	12	0	2	18	.260	0
26 Brooks Conrad	30	54	7	11	1	2	2	8	.204	0
23 Matt Diaz	125	371	56	116	18	4	13	58	.313	12
19 Yunel Escobar	141	528	89	158	26	2	14	76	.299	5
7 Jeff Francoeur	82	304	32	76	12	2	5	35	.250	5
30 Reid Gorecki	31	25	6	5	0	0	0	3	.200	1
27 Diory Hernández #	33	85	6	12	3	0	1	6	.141	0
4 Omar Infante	70	203	24	62	9	1	2	27	.305	2
2 Kelly Johnson	106	303	47	68	20	3	8	29	.224	7
28 Brandon Jones	5	13	2	4	0	0	0	1	.308	0
10 Chipper Jones	143	488	80	129	23	2	18	71	.264	4
22 Casey Kotchman	87	298	28	84	20	0	6	41	.282	0
22 Adam LaRoche *	57	212	30	69	11	1	12	40	.325	0
16 Brian McCann	138	488	63	137	35	1	21	94	.281	4
13 Nate McLouth *	84	339	59	87	20	1	11	36	.257	12
20 Greg Norton	95	76	3	11	2	0	0	7	.145	0
14 Martín Prado	128	450	64	138	38	0	11	49	.307	1
8 David Ross	54	128	18	35	9	0	7	20	.273	0
5 Clint Sammons	6	11	1	2	0	0	0	0	.182	0
24 Jordan Schafer #	50	167	18	34	8	0	2	8	.204	2
Pitcher Totals	162	309	24	43	5	0	1	11	.139	0
Team totals	162	5539	735	1459	300	20	149	700	.263	58

As of October 4, 2009

- * = Acquired Mid-Season
- # = Not on Active roster
- "()" = Stats with Braves

=== Pitching ===
Note: W = Wins; L = Losses; ERA = Earned run average; G = Games pitched; GS = Games started; SV = Saves; IP = Innings pitched; R = Runs allowed; ER = Earned runs allowed; BB = Walks allowed; K = Strikeouts

Player	W	L	ERA	G	GS	SV	IP	R	ER	BB	K
46 Manny Acosta #	1	1	4.34	36	0	0	37.1	19	18	19	32
Jeff Bennett †	2	4	3.18	33	0	0	34.0	13	12	21	23
Blaine Boyer †	0	1	40.50	3	0	0	1.1	6	6	3	2
57 Jorge Campillo #	1	0	4.15	5	0	0	4.1	3	2	3	3
38 Buddy Carlyle	0	1	8.86	16	0	0	21.1	23	21	12	12
51 Mike González	5	4	2.42	80	0	10	74.1	28	20	33	90
48 Tommy Hanson	11	4	2.89	21	21	0	127.2	42	41	46	116
15 Tim Hudson	2	1	3.61	7	7	0	42.1	17	17	13	30
49 Jair Jurrjens	14	10	2.60	34	34	0	215.0	71	62	75	152
11 Kenshin Kawakami	7	12	3.86	32	25	1	156.1	73	67	57	105
36 Boone Logan	1	1	5.19	20	0	0	17.1	12	10	9	10
32 Derek Lowe	15	10	4.67	34	34	0	194.2	109	101	63	111
54 Kris Medlen	3	5	4.26	37	4	0	67.2	34	32	30	72
58 Peter Moylan	6	2	2.84	87	0	0	73.0	29	23	35	61
56 Vladimir Núñez	0	0	36.00	1	0	0	1.0	4	4	2	1
34 Eric O'Flaherty	2	1	3.04	78	0	0	56.1	23	19	18	39
40 James Parr #	0	0	5.79	8	0	0	14.0	9	9	5	12
37 Jo-Jo Reyes #	0	2	7.00	6	5	0	27.0	25	21	13	21
39 Rafael Soriano	1	6	2.97	77	0	27	75.2	25	25	27	102
50 Luis Valdez	0	1	3.38	3	0	0	2.2	1	1	2	0
33 Javier Vázquez	15	10	2.87	32	32	0	219.1	75	70	44	238
Team totals	86	76	3.57	162	162	38	1462.2	641	581	530	1232

As of October 4, 2009

- † = No longer with team
- # = Not on Active roster

== Farm system ==
Level	Team	League	Manager
AAA	Gwinnett Braves	International League	Dave Brundage
AA	Mississippi Braves	Southern League	Phillip Wellman
A	Myrtle Beach Pelicans	Carolina League	Rocket Wheeler
A	Rome Braves	South Atlantic League	Randy Ingle
Rookie	Danville Braves	Appalachian League	Paul Runge
Rookie	GCL Braves	Gulf Coast League	Luis Ortiz

LEAGUE CHAMPIONS: Danville
