= 2009 Florida Marlins season =

2009 Florida Marlins
- League: National League
- Division: East
- Ballpark: Land Shark Stadium
- City: Miami Gardens, Florida
- Record: 87–75 (.537)
- Divisional place: 2nd
- Owners: Jeffrey Loria
- President of baseball operations: Larry Beinfest
- General managers: Michael Hill
- Managers: Fredi González
- Television: Fox Sports Florida; Sun Sports; Rich Waltz, Tommy Hutton
- Radio: Florida Marlins Radio Network (English); Dave Van Horne, Glenn Geffner; WAQI (Spanish)

The 2009 Florida Marlins season was the 17th season for the Major League Baseball franchise. The Marlins played their home games at Sun Life Stadium. Fredi González returned for his third straight season as manager. The Marlins failed to make the playoffs for the sixth consecutive season. This would also mark the Marlins' last winning season until 2020.

== Regular season ==
=== April ===
Opening Day showcased the Marlins′ new emphasis on pitching and speed, although several home runs were hit too. New leadoff hitter Emilio Bonifacio had three stolen bases and an inside-the-park home run, going 4-for-5. A grand slam by Hanley Ramírez, and homers by Jorge Cantú and Jeremy Hermida capped a spectacular performance in a 12–6 win over the Washington Nationals. The 12 runs set a franchise record for most runs scored on Opening Day. Following an opening series sweep of Washington, the Marlins won two of three games against the New York Mets. Next, Florida had a nine-game road trip, visiting Atlanta, Washington, and Pittsburgh for three games each. The Marlins swept both the Braves and Nationals to earn a franchise-best 11–1 record to open a season. But then they stumbled in Pittsburgh, losing all three games to the Pirates. Then the Marlins returned home to meet the Phillies, and lost all three games there too. In the final game against Philadelphia, outfielder Cody Ross pitched an inning of relief, becoming the first Marlins position player to pitch since Jason Wood did so in 2007. The Marlins closed April with three straight wins on the road.

=== May ===
The Marlins opened the month by losing the final three games of a four-game series at the Chicago Cubs. This was the beginning of one of the worst months in Marlins history going 5–20. Ricky Nolasco never returned to his 2008 form and was sent down to AAA. Worse yet, their number three starter Aníbal Sánchez got injured and the Marlins experimented with different pitchers including John Koronka, Graham Taylor, and even tried starting relievers Hayden Penn and Burke Badenhop before finally settling for Sean West. For the second time in 2009 a position player, Ross Gload pitched a hitless 9th inning in a 15–2 loss to the Tampa Bay Rays. After being 11–1 near the end of April the Marlins finished May with a 23–28 record.

=== June ===
In June the Marlins slowly were able to climb back to a 40–39 record. Rookie pitcher Sean West went into the seventh inning against his childhood idol Randy Johnson and the San Francisco Giants with a no-hitter before Édgar Rentería hit a single. and Ricky Nolasco returned from the Minors and was better than ever. Hanley Ramírez started to play like an MVP, by hitting 2 grand slams in one series against the Baltimore Orioles, his second and third of the year, then continued to have RBIs for 10 straight games into July 2 for a Florida Marlins franchise record.

=== July ===
In the beginning of July Hanley Ramírez was voted as the starting shortstop for the National League in the 2009 MLB All-Star Game. Teammate and pitcher Josh Johnson joined him but was not named a starter. At the All-Star Game, Ramírez went 0 for 3 with 3 ground balls. Johnson did not get the opportunity to pitch. Coming out of the All-Star Break, the Marlins ran in the Philadelphia Phillies with a four-game series. Since the 3rd game got rained out, they only lost all 3 games. No. 5 starter Sean West was sent to the minors and Rick VandenHurk was called up to make his 2009 Marlins debut. Also, their No. 4 starter Andrew Miller was sent down and Gaby Sánchez joined the team.

=== Season standings ===
NL East
Team	W	L	Pct.	GB	Home	Road
Philadelphia Phillies	93	69	.574	—	45‍–‍36	48‍–‍33
Florida Marlins	87	75	.537	6	43‍–‍38	44‍–‍37
Atlanta Braves	86	76	.531	7	40‍–‍41	46‍–‍35
New York Mets	70	92	.432	23	41‍–‍40	29‍–‍52
Washington Nationals	59	103	.364	34	33‍–‍48	26‍–‍55

=== Record vs. opponents ===
2009 National League record Source: MLB Standings Grid – 2009
Team	AZ	ATL	CHC	CIN	COL	FLA	HOU	LAD	MIL	NYM	PHI	PIT	SD	SF	STL	WAS	AL
Arizona	–	3–4	4–2	1–5	7–11	5–3	5–4	7–11	2–5	5–2	1–5	6–1	11–7	5–13	2–4	1–5	5–10
Atlanta	4–3	–	4–2	3–6	4–4	8–10	3–3	4–3	3–3	13–5	10–8	3–4	3–3	3–4	4–2	10–8	7–8
Chicago	2–4	2–4	–	10–5	2–4	4–3	11–6	3–5	10–7	3–3	1–5	10–4	4–5	4–2	6–10	5–2	6–9
Cincinnati	5–1	6–3	5–10	–	0–7	3–3	12–4	1–5	8–7	2–4	2–5	13–5	1–6	3–3	8–8	3–4	6–9
Colorado	11–7	4–4	4–2	7–0	–	2–4	2–5	4–14	6–0	3–4	2–4	6–3	10–8	8–10	6–1	6–0	11–4
Florida	3–5	10–8	3–4	3–3	4–2	–	4–3	3–3	3–4	11–7	9–9	2–4	4–2	3–4	3–3	12–6	10–8
Houston	4–5	3–3	6–11	4–12	5–2	3–4	–	4–3	5–10	1–5	6–2	10–5	6–1	2–4	6–9	3–3	6–9
Los Angeles	11–7	3–4	5–3	5–1	14–4	3–3	3–4	–	3–3	5–1	4–3	4–3	10–8	11–7	2–5	3–2	9–9
Milwaukee	5–2	3–3	7–10	7–8	0–6	4–3	10–5	3–3	–	3–3	4–3	9–5	2–4	4–5	9–9	5–3	5–10
New York	2–5	5–13	3–3	4–2	4–3	7–11	5–1	1–5	3–3	–	6–12	4–3	2–5	5–3	4–5	10–8	5–10
Philadelphia	5–1	8–10	5–1	5–2	4–2	9–9	2–6	3–4	3–4	12–6	–	4–2	5–2	3–4	4–1	15–3	6–12
Pittsburgh	1–6	4–3	4–10	5–13	3–6	4–2	5–10	3–4	5–9	3–4	2–4	–	3–4	2–4	5–10	5–3	8–7
San Diego	7–11	3–3	5–4	6–1	8–10	2–4	1–6	8–10	4–2	5–2	2–5	4–3	–	10–8	1–6	4–2	5–10
San Francisco	13–5	4–3	2–4	3–3	10–8	4–3	4–2	7–11	5–4	3–5	4–3	4–2	8–10	–	4–3	4–2	9–6
St. Louis	4–2	2–4	10–6	8–8	1–6	3–3	9–6	5–2	9–9	5–4	1–4	10–5	6–1	3–4	–	6–1	9–6
Washington	5–1	8–10	2–5	4–3	0–6	6–12	3–3	2–3	3–5	8–10	3–15	3–5	2–4	2–4	1–6	–	7–11

=== Game log ===
2009 game log
April (14–8)

#	Date	Opponent	Score	Win	Loss	Save	Attendance	Record
1	April 6	Nationals	12–6	Nolasco (1–0)	Lannan (0–1)		34,323	1–0
2	April 7	Nationals	8–3	Johnson (1–0)	Olsen (0–1)		11,124	2–0
3	April 8	Nationals	6–4	Volstad (1–0)	Cabrera (0–1)	Lindstrom (1)	13,308	3–0
4	April 10	Mets	5–4	Lindstrom (1–0)	Feliciano (0–1)		24,070	4–0
5	April 11	Mets	8–4	Hernández (1–0)	Nolasco (1–1)		39,412	4–1
6	April 12	Mets	2–1	Johnson (2–0)	Santana (1–1)		18,109	5–1
7	April 14	@ Braves	5–1	Volstad (2–0)	Vázquez (0–1)		16,293	6–1
8	April 15	@ Braves	10–4	Penn (1–0)	Moylan (0–1)		19,204	7–1
9	April 16	@ Braves	6–2	Sánchez (1–0)	Kawakami (1–1)		21,072	8–1
10	April 17	@ Nationals	3 – 2 (10)	Núñez (1–0)	Rivera (0–2)	Lindstrom (2)	19,026	9–1
11	April 18	@ Nationals	9 – 6 (11)	Calero (1–0)	Tavárez (0–1)		19,864	10–1
12	April 19	@ Nationals	7–4	Núñez (2–0)	Rivera (0–3)	Lindstrom (3)	16,974	11–1
13	April 20	@ Pirates	8–0	Ohlendorf (1–2)	Miller (0–1)		8,790	11–2
14	April 21	@ Pirates	3–2	Karstens (1–0)	Sánchez (1–1)	Capps (4)	9,917	11–3
15	April 22	@ Pirates	7–4	Maholm (3–0)	Nolasco (1–2)	Capps (5)	10,655	11–4
16	April 24	Phillies	7–3	Condrey (3–0)	Lindstrom (1–1)		29,032	11–5
17	April 25	Phillies	6 – 4 (10)	Madson (2–1)	Kensing (0–1)	Lidge (4)	26,412	11–6
18	April 26	Phillies	13–2	Moyer (3–1)	Taylor (0–1)		17,177	11–7
19	April 27	@ Mets	7–1	Maine (1–2)	Sánchez (1–2)		38,573	11–8
20	April 28	@ Mets	7–4	Badenhop (1–0)	Green (0–1)	Lindstrom (4)	38,546	12–8
21	April 29	@ Mets	4–3	Pinto (1–0)	Putz (1–2)	Lindstrom (5)	39,339	13–8
22	April 30	@ Cubs	8 – 2 (10)	Pinto (2–0)	Heilman (2–1)		37,956	14–8

May (9–20)

#	Date	Opponent	Score	Win	Loss	Save	Attendance	Record
23	May 1	@ Cubs	8–6	Patton (1–1)	Badenhop (1–1)	Gregg (2)	38,336	14–9
24	May 2	@ Cubs	6–1	Lilly (3–2)	Sánchez (1–3)		40,083	14–10
25	May 3	@ Cubs	6–4	Zambrano (3–1)	Nolasco (1–3)	Gregg (3)	40,457	14–11
26	May 4	Reds	3 – 2 (14)	Badenhop (2–1)	Herrera (0–1)		10,825	15–11
27	May 5	Reds	7–0	Vólquez (4–2)	Volstad (2–1)		11,087	15–12
28	May 6	Braves	8–6	Lowe (4–1)	Taylor (0–2)	González (4)	12,725	15–13
29	May 7	Braves	4–2	Jurrjens (3–2)	Sánchez (1–4)	González (5)	17,759	15–14
30	May 8	@ Rockies	8–3	Nolasco (2–3)	Hammel (0–1)		27,398	16–14
31	May 9	@ Rockies	3–1	Johnson (3–0)	de la Rosa (0–3)	Lindstrom (6)	28,227	17–14
32	May 10	@ Rockies	3–2	Cook (2–1)	Volstad (2–2)	Street (4)	30,197	17–15
33	May 12	@ Brewers	6–3	Parra (2–4)	Koronka (0–1)	Hoffman (6)	29,331	17–16
34	May 13	@ Brewers	8–6	Looper (3–2)	Nolasco (2–4)	Hoffman (7)	32,825	17–17
35	May 14	@ Brewers	5–3	Bush (2–0)	Badenhop (2–2)	Hoffman (8)	35,658	17–18
36	May 15	Dodgers	6–4	Weaver (2–0)	Volstad (2–3)	Broxton (9)	20,039	17–19
37	May 16	Dodgers	6–3	Miller (1–1)	Weaver (2–1)	Lindstrom (7)	25,132	18–19
38	May 17	Dodgers	12–5	Kershaw (2–3)	Koronka (0–2)		16,332	18–20
	May 18	Diamondbacks	Postponed (rain) Rescheduled May 20, (doubleheader)					
39	May 19	Diamondbacks	5–3	Garland (4–2)	Johnson (3–1)	Qualls (9)	10,131	18–21
40	May 20	Diamondbacks	8–6	Volstad (3–3)	Davis (2–6)	Lindstrom (8)		19–21
41	May 20	Diamondbacks	11 – 9 (13)	Qualls (1–0)	Núñez (2–1)	Rauch (1)	14,426	19–22
42	May 21	Diamondbacks	4–3	Zavada (1–0)	Martínez (0–1)	Qualls (10)	12,045	19–23
43	May 22	Rays	15–2	Sonnanstine (3–4)	Nolasco (2–5)		16,226	19–24
44	May 23	Rays	10–3	Balfour (2–0)	Núñez (2–2)		20,253	19–25
45	May 24	Rays	5 – 4 (11)	Sanches (1–0)	Cormier (0–1)		12,839	20–25
46	May 25	@ Phillies	5–3	Volstad (4–3)	Moyer (3–5)	Lindstrom (9)	45,186	21–25
47	May 26	@ Phillies	5–3	Blanton (3–3)	Miller (1–2)	Lidge (9)	42,249	21–26
48	May 27	@ Phillies	6–2	Badenhop (3–2)	Myers (4–3)		45,256	22–26
49	May 29	@ Mets	2 – 1 (11)	Feliciano (2–1)	Sanches (1–1)		40,677	22–27
50	May 30	@ Mets	7–3	Johnson (4–1)	Redding (0–2)	Núñez (1)	40,727	23–27
51	May 31	@ Mets	3–2	Maine (5–3)	Volstad (4–4)	Rodríguez (14)	40,482	23–28

June (17–11)

#	Date	Opponent	Score	Win	Loss	Save	Attendance	Record
52	June 1	Brewers	7–4	Martínez (1–0)	Julio (1–1)	Lindstrom (10)	10,509	24–28
53	June 2	Brewers	10–3	Badenhop (4–2)	Parra (3–7)		10,831	25–28
54	June 3	Brewers	9–6	McClung (3–1)	West (0–1)	Hoffman (14)	13,012	25–29
55	June 4	Brewers	4–3	Johnson (5–1)	Bush (3–2)	Lindstrom (11)	11,623	26–29
56	June 5	Giants	2–1	Zito (2–6)	Volstad (4–5)	Wilson (14)	12,841	26–30
57	June 6	Giants	5–4	Miller (2–2)	Sánchez (2–5)	Núñez (2)	16,294	27–30
58	June 7	Giants	3–2	Lincecum (5–1)	Nolasco (2–6)	Wilson (15)	11,505	27–31
59	June 8	Giants	4–0	West (1–1)	Johnson (5–5)		12,068	28–31
60	June 9	Cardinals	4–3	Lindstrom (2–1)	Motte (2–2)		13,103	29–31
61	June 10	Cardinals	13–4	Wainwright (6–4)	Volstad (4–6)		14,624	29–32
62	June 11	Cardinals	6–5	Miller (2–0)	Núñez (2–3)	Franklin (14)	19,112	29–33
63	June 12	@ Blue Jays	7–3	Meyer (1–0)	League (1–3)		17,922	30–33
64	June 13	@ Blue Jays	6–5	West (2–1)	Janssen (2–3)	Lindstrom (12)	20,634	31–33
65	June 14	@ Blue Jays	11–3	Johnson (6–1)	Tallet (4–4)		20,985	32–33
66	June 16	@ Red Sox	8–2	Wakefield (9–3)	Volstad (4–7)		38,149	32–34
67	June 17	@ Red Sox	6–1	Penny (6–2)	Miller (2–3)		38,196	32–35
68	June 18	@ Red Sox	2–1 (6)	Nolasco (3–6)	Lester (5–6)		37,577	33–35
69	June 19	Yankees	5–1	Pettitte (7–3)	West (2–2)		35,027	33–36
70	June 20	Yankees	2–1	Johnson (7–1)	Burnett (5–4)	Lindstrom (13)	46,427	34–36
71	June 21	Yankees	6–5	Volstad (5–7)	Tomko (0–2)	Lindstrom (14)	35,827	35–36
72	June 23	Orioles	7–6 (12)	Badenhop (5–2)	Bass (4–2)		10,222	36–36
73	June 24	Orioles	5–2	Nolasco (4–6)	Berken (1–4)	Meyer (1)	12,469	37–36
74	June 25	Orioles	11–3	West (3–2)	Hill (3–2)		12,822	38–36
75	June 26	@ Rays	7–3	Howell (3–2)	Pinto (2–1)		20,972	38–37
76	June 27	@ Rays	3–2	Howell (4–2)	Badenhop (5–3)		35,790	38–38
77	June 28	@ Rays	5–2	Price (2–2)	Miller (2–4)		29,459	38–39
78	June 29	Nationals	4–2	Nolasco (5–6)	Villone (3–5)	Núñez (3)	10,623	39–39
79	June 30	Nationals	7–5 (7)	Pinto (3–1)	Beimel (0–4)		11,821	40–39

July (14–10)

#	Date	Opponent	Score	Win	Loss	Save	Attendance	Record
80	July 1	Nationals	5–3	Meyer (2–0)	Tavárez (3–6)	Núñez (4)	27,032	41–39
81	July 3	Pirates	7–4	Morton (1–1)	Volstad (5–8)		16,114	41–40
82	July 4	Pirates	5–3	Miller (3–4)	Duke	Meyer (2)	25,303	42–40
83	July 5	Pirates	5–0	Nolasco (6–6)	Ohlendorf		13,287	43–40
84	July 6	@ Giants	5–4	Cain (10–2)	West (3–3)	Brian Wilson (22)	26,995	43–41
85	July 7	@ Giants	3–0	Zito (5–8)	Johnson (7–2)	Romo (1)	27,799	43–42
86	July 8	@ Giants	7–0	Volstad (6–8)	Sadowski (2–1)		34,157	44–42
87	July 9	@ Diamondbacks	14–7	Calero (2–0)	Schoeneweis (1–1)		21,558	45–42
88	July 10	@ Diamondbacks	8–0	Haren (9–5)	Nolasco (6–7)		21,307	45–43
89	July 11	@ Diamondbacks	5–1	Garland (5–8)	West (3–4)		29,477	45–44
90	July 12	@ Diamondbacks	8–1	Johnson (8–2)	Davis (4–9)		28,617	46–44
91	July 16	Phillies	4–0	Moyer (9–6)	Volstad (6–9)		15,171	46–45
92	July 17	Phillies	6–5 (12)	Condrey (5–2)	Badenhop (5–4)	Lidge (19)	22,891	46–46
	July 18	Phillies	Postponed (rain) Rescheduled Sep 22, (doubleheader)					
93	July 19	Phillies	5–0	Happ (7–0)	Miller (3–5)		15,033	46–47
94	July 20	@ Padres	3–2	VandenHurk (1–0)	Burke (2–2)	Núñez (5)	17,184	47–47
95	July 21	@ Padres	3–2	Volstad (7–9)	Gaudin (4–9)	Núñez (6)	20,311	48–47
96	July 22	@ Padres	5–0	Nolasco (7–7)	Geer (1–6)		16,450	49–47
97	July 24	@ Dodgers	6–3	Johnson (9–2)	McDonald (2–2)	Núñez (7)	51,565	50–47
98	July 25	@ Dodgers	4–3	Broxton (7–0)	Meyer (2–1)		50,248	50–48
99	July 26	@ Dodgers	8–6	Volstad (8–9)	Schmidt (1–1)		48,597	51–48
100	July 28	Braves	4–3	Núñez (3–3)	Soriano (1–2)		13,128	52–48
101	July 29	Braves	6–3	Johnson (10–2)	Kawakami (5–8)	Núñez (8)	13,518	53–48
102	July 30	Braves	6 – 3 (10)	Moylan (3–2)	Ayala (1–3)	Soriano (15)	14,226	53–49
103	July 31	Cubs	5–2	Donnelly (1–0)	Mármol (2–2)	Núñez (9)	25,024	54–49

August (14–14)

#	Date	Opponent	Score	Win	Loss	Save	Attendance	Record
104	August 1	Cubs	9–8 (10)	Gregg (4–2)	Núñez (3–4)	Heilman (1)	35,811	54–50
105	August 2	Cubs	3–2	Donnelly (2–0)	Gregg (4–3)		25,969	55–50
106	August 4	@ Nationals	6–4	Villone (4–5)	Calero (2–1)	MacDougal (9)	19,828	55–51
107	August 5	@ Nationals	5–4	Lannan (8–8)	VandenHurk (1–1)	MacDougal (10)	18,312	55–52
108	August 6	@ Nationals	12–8	Sosa (1–0)	Ayala (1–4)		23,691	55–53
109	August 7	@ Phillies	3–2	Nolasco (8–7)	Blanton (7–7)	Núñez (10)	45,114	56–53
110	August 8	@ Phillies	6–4	Sanches (2–1)	Hamels (7–6)	Núñez (11)	45,086	57–53
111	August 9	@ Phillies	12–3	Johnson (11–2)	Moyer 10–9		45,169	58–53
112	August 10	Astros	8–6	VandenHurk (2–1)	Moehler (7–8)	Núñez (12)	12,325	59–53
113	August 11	Astros	9 – 8 (11)	Sanches (3–1)	Wright (2–2)		13,312	60–53
114	August 12	Astros	14–6	Norris (3–0)	Nolasco (8–8)		21,122	60–54
115	August 13	Astros	9–2	West (4–4)	Hampton (7–10)		14,047	61–54
116	August 14	Rockies	6–5	Johnson (12–2)	Hammel (7–7)	Núñez (13)	15,965	62–54
	August 15	Rockies	Postponed (rain) Rescheduled Aug 16, (doubleheader, 2nd game)					
117	August 16	Rockies	10–3	Volstad (9–9)	Cook (10–5)			63–54
118	August 16	Rockies	7–3	de la Rosa (11–8)	VandenHurk (2–2)	Street (29)	20,089	63–55
119	August 18	@ Astros	6–2	Nolasco (9–8)	Norris (3–1)		30,189	64–55
120	August 19	@ Astros	6–3	Gervacio (1–0)	West (4–5)	Valverde (17)	30,101	64–56
121	August 20	@ Astros	4–1	Rodríguez (12–7)	Johnson (12–3)	Valverde (18)	30,039	64–57
122	August 21	@ Braves	5–3	Sánchez (2–4)	Vázquez (10–9)	Núñez (14)	22,608	65–57
123	August 22	@ Braves	4–3	Hanson (9–2)	Volstad (9–10)	Soriano (19)	35,200	65–58
124	August 23	@ Braves	7–5	Moylan (6–2)	Calero (2–2)	Soriano (20)	30,478	65–59
125	August 25	Mets	2–1	West (5–5)	Figueroa (1–3)	Núñez (15)	14,278	66–59
126	August 26	Mets	5–3	Johnson (13–3)	Pelfrey (9–9)	Núñez (16)	16,123	67–59
127	August 27	Mets	10–3	Redding (2–4)	Sánchez (2–5)		12,423	67–60
128	August 28	Padres	9–5	Correia (9–10)	Volstad (9–11)		14,402	67–61
129	August 29	Padres	7–4	Russell (1–0)	Ayala (1–5)	Bell (31)	20,924	67–62
130	August 30	Padres	6–4	West (6–5)	Latos (4–4)	Núñez (17)	12,873	68–62
131	August 31	Braves	5–2	Kawakami (7–10)	Johnson (13–4)		12,244	68–63

September (17–11)

#	Date	Opponent	Score	Win	Loss	Save	Attendance	Record
132	September 1	Braves	4–3	Hudson (1–0)	Sánchez (2–6)	Soriano (21)	14,024	68–64
133	September 2	Braves	8–7	Núñez (4–4)	Gonzalez (3–4)		14,723	69–64
134	September 3	Braves	8–3	Nolasco (10–8)	Medlen (3–5)		13,711	70–64
135	September 4	@ Nationals	9–6	Badenhop (6–4)	Mock (3–7)	Núñez (18)	16,364	71–64
136	September 5	@ Nationals	9–5	Johnson (14–4)	Hernández (7–10)		18,111	72–64
137	September 6	@ Nationals	5–4	MacDougal (1–0)	Núñez (4–5)		22,325	72–65
138	September 8	@ Mets	4–2	Sanches (4–1)	Redding (2–5)	Núñez (19)	37,474	73–65
139	September 9	@ Mets	6–3	Nolasco (11–8)	Misch (1–2)	Núñez (20)	37,312	74–65
140	September 10	@ Mets	13–4	Badenhop (7–4)	Parnell (3–8)		37,620	75–65
141	September 11	Nationals	5–3	Martin (4–4)	Sanches (4–2)	MacDougal (15)	15,247	75–66
142	September 12	Nationals	11–3	Wood (1–0)	Estrada (0–1)		38,214	76–66
143	September 13	Nationals	7–2	Lannan (9–11)	Volstad (9–12)		15,065	76–67
144	September 14	@ Cardinals	11–6	Hawksworth (4–0)	Nolasco (11–9)		43,582	76–68
145	September 15	@ Cardinals	2–1	West (7–5)	Wainwright (18–8)	Núñez (21)	42,895	77–68
146	September 16	@ Cardinals	5–2	Johnson (15–4)	Piñeiro (14–11)	Núñez (22)	43,020	78–68
147	September 17	@ Reds	3–2	Maloney (1–4)	Sánchez (2–7)	Cordero (38)	9,685	78–69
148	September 18	@ Reds	4–3	Donnelly (3–0)	Cordero (2–6)	Núñez (23)	15,882	79–69
149	September 19	@ Reds	3–2	Nolasco (12–9)	Arroyo (13–13)	Lindstrom (15)	17,026	80–69
150	September 20	@ Reds	8–1	Wells (8–6)	West (2–4)		16,186	80–70
	September 21	Phillies	Postponed (rain) Rescheduled Sep 21, (doubleheader, 1st game)					
151	September 22	Phillies	9–3	Blanton (11–7)	Johnson (15–5)			80–71
152	September 22	Phillies	3–0	Sánchez (3–7)	Moyer (12–10)	Núñez (24)	20,039	81–71
153	September 23	Phillies	7–6	Meyer (3–1)	Lidge (0–8)		31,042	82–71
154	September 25	Mets	6–5	Parnell (4–8)	Núñez (4–6)	Rodríguez (34)	39,031	82–72
155	September 26	Mets	9–6	West (8–6)	Maine (6–6)	Donnelly (1)	35,666	83–72
156	September 27	Mets	4–0	Misch (2–4)	Volstad (9–13)		31,167	83–73
157	September 28	@ Braves	4–0	Jurrjens (14–10)	Sánchez (3–8)		25,046	83–74
158	September 29	@ Braves	5–4	Pinto (4–1)	Kawakami (7–12)	Núñez (25)	28,669	84–74
159	September 30	@ Braves	5–4	Nolasco (13–9)	Vázquez (15–10)	Donnelly (2)	31,513	85–74

October (2–1)

#	Date	Opponent	Score	Win	Loss	Save	Attendance	Record
160	October 2	@ Phillies	7–2	VandenHurk (3–2)	Blanton (12–8)		45,135	86–74
161	October 3	@ Phillies	4–3	Sánchez (4–8)	Hamels (10–11)	Núñez (26)	45,141	87–74
162	October 4	@ Phillies	7 – 6 (10)	Durbin (2–2)	Meyer (3–2)		45,211	87–75

=== Roster ===
2009 Florida Marlins
Roster
Pitchers: 52 Luis Ayala; 35 Burke Badenhop; 40 Kiko Calero; 39 Dave Davidson; 48 Brendan Donnelly; 55 Josh Johnson; 20 Logan Kensing; 30 John Koronka; 63 Chris Leroux; 22 Matt Lindstrom; 60 Carlos Martínez; 51 Cristhian Martínez; 53 Dan Meyer; 23 Andrew Miller; 47 Ricky Nolasco; 46 Leo Núñez; 48 Hayden Penn; 37 Renyel Pinto; 44 Brian Sanches; 19 Aníbal Sánchez; 50 Graham Taylor; 56 Rick VandenHurk; 41 Chris Volstad; 45 Sean West; 64 Tim Wood	Catchers: 21 John Baker; 29 Ronny Paulino; Infielders: 1 Emilio Bonifacio; 3 Jorge Cantú; 7 Ross Gload; 13 Andy González; 59 Brett Hayes; 18 Wes Helms; 20 Nick Johnson; 2 Hanley Ramírez; 14 Gaby Sánchez; 6 Dan Uggla; Outfielders: 4 Alfredo Amézaga; 25 Brett Carroll; 8 Chris Coghlan; 11 Alejandro De Aza; 27 Jeremy Hermida; 24 Cameron Maybin; 12 Cody Ross	Manager: 33 Fredi González; Coaches: 67 Pierre Arsenault; 54 Steve Foster (bullpen); 9 Andy Fox (first base/infield); 16 Bo Porter (third base); 17 Jim Presley (hitting); 10 Carlos Tosca (bench); 28 Mark Wiley (pitching)

== Player stats ==
=== Batting ===
Note: G = Games played; AB = At bats; R = Runs scored; H = Hits; 2B = Doubles; 3B = Triples; HR = Home runs; RBI = Runs batted in; AVG = Batting average; SB = Stolen bases

Player	G	AB	R	H	2B	3B	HR	RBI	AVG	SB
Jorge Cantú	149	585	67	169	42	0	16	100	.289	3
Hanley Ramírez	151	576	101	197	42	1	24	106	.342	27
Dan Uggla	158	564	84	137	27	1	31	90	.243	2
Cody Ross	151	559	73	151	37	1	24	90	.270	5
Chris Coghlan	128	504	84	162	31	6	9	47	.321	8
Emilio Bonifacio	127	461	72	116	11	6	1	27	.252	21
Jeremy Hermida	129	429	48	111	14	2	13	47	.259	5
John Baker	112	373	59	101	25	0	9	50	.271	0
Ronny Paulino	80	239	24	65	10	1	8	27	.272	1
Ross Gload	125	230	33	60	10	2	6	30	.261	0
Wes Helms	113	214	18	58	11	0	3	33	.271	1
Cameron Maybin	54	176	30	44	12	2	4	13	.250	1
Brett Carroll	92	141	18	33	8	2	3	18	.234	0
Nick Johnson	35	104	24	29	8	0	2	18	.279	0
Alfredo Amezaga	27	69	6	15	3	0	0	5	.217	1
Gaby Sánchez	21	21	2	5	0	0	2	3	.238	0
Alejandro De Aza	22	20	6	5	1	0	0	3	.250	0
Brett Hayes	14	11	5	3	1	0	1	2	.273	0
Andy González	14	12	1	0	1	0	1	0	.083	0
Josh Johnson	34	62	8	12	1	0	3	10	.194	0
Ricky Nolasco	31	50	1	7	0	0	0	3	.140	0
Chris Volstad	30	47	5	6	1	0	0	3	.128	0
Sean West	20	31	2	2	1	0	0	0	.065	0
Aníbal Sánchez	16	23	0	0	0	0	0	0	.000	0
Andrew Miller	20	24	0	2	0	0	0	0	.083	0
Rick VandenHurk	11	21	0	0	0	0	0	0	.000	0
Burke Badenhop	35	10	0	0	0	0	0	1	.000	0
Graham Taylor	3	3	0	0	0	0	0	0	.000	0
Brian Sanches	47	4	1	0	0	0	0	1	.000	0
Tim Wood	18	2	0	1	0	0	0	0	.500	0
John Koronka	2	1	0	0	0	0	0	0	.000	0
Cristhian Martínez	15	2	0	0	0	0	0	0	.000	0
Dan Meyer	71	2	0	0	0	0	0	0	.000	0
Renyel Pinto	73	1	0	0	0	0	0	0	.000	0
Dave Davidson	1	1	0	1	0	0	0	0	1.000	0
Team totals	162	5572	772	1493	296	25	159	727	.268	75

Note: Pitchers batting data are included above.

=== Pitching ===
Note: G = Games pitched; GS = Games started; W = Wins; L = Losses; SV = Saves; IP = Innings pitched; H =Hits; ER = Earned runs allowed; BB = Walks allowed; K = Strikeouts; ERA = Earned run average;

Player	G	GS	W	L	SV	IP	H	ER	BB	K	ERA
Josh Johnson	33	33	15	5	0	209.0	184	75	64	191	3.23
Ricky Nolasco	31	31	13	9	0	185.0	188	104	51	195	5.06
Chris Volstad	29	29	9	13	0	159.0	169	92	62	107	5.21
Sean West	20	20	8	6	0	103.1	115	55	44	70	4.79
Aníbal Sánchez	16	16	4	8	0	86.0	84	37	51	71	3.87
Andrew Miller	20	14	3	5	0	80.0	85	43	44	59	4.84
Rick VandenHurk	11	11	3	2	0	58.2	57	28	24	49	4.30
Graham Taylor	3	3	0	2	0	11.0	16	10	12	5	8.18
John Koronka	2	2	0	2	0	7.1	11	9	7	4	11.05
Burke Badenhop	35	2	7	4	0	72.0	71	30	28	57	3.75
Hayden Penn	16	1	1	0	0	22.0	30	19	22	27	7.77
Leo Nunez	75	0	4	6	26	68.2	59	31	32	60	4.06
Matt Lindstrom	54	0	2	1	15	47.1	54	31	26	39	5.89
Dan Meyer	71	0	3	2	2	58.1	47	20	23	56	3.09
Kiko Calero	67	0	2	2	0	60.0	36	13	34	69	1.95
Renyel Pinto	73	0	4	1	0	61.1	53	22	47	58	3.23
Brian Sanches	47	0	4	2	0	56.1	50	16	34	51	2.56
Cristhian Martínez	15	0	1	1	0	26.1	27	15	9	18	5.13
Brendan Donnelly	30	0	3	0	2	25.1	22	5	10	25	1.78
Tim Wood	18	0	1	0	0	22.1	22	7	11	16	2.82
Luis Ayala	10	0	0	3	0	7.2	12	10	9	7	11.74
Logan Kensing	6	0	0	1	0	7.1	14	8	5	7	9.82
Chris Leroux	5	0	0	0	0	6.2	11	8	4	2	10.80
Carlos Martinez	2	0	0	0	0	2.1	3	1	2	2	3.86
Ross Gload	1	0	0	0	0	1.0	0	0	2	0	0.00
Cody Ross	1	0	0	0	0	1.0	1	0	0	0	0.00
Dave Davidson	1	0	0	0	0	1.0	4	5	4	3	45.00
Team totals	162	162	87	75	45	1446.1	1425	690	661	1248	4.29

== Farm system ==
Level	Team	League	Manager
AAA	New Orleans Zephyrs	Pacific Coast League	Edwin Rodríguez
AA	Jacksonville Suns	Southern League	Brandon Hyde
A	Jupiter Hammerheads	Florida State League	Tim Leiper
A	Greensboro Grasshoppers	South Atlantic League	Darin Everson
A-Short Season	Jamestown Jammers	New York–Penn League	Andy Haines
Rookie	GCL Marlins	Gulf Coast League	Jorge Hernández

LEAGUE CHAMPIONS: Jacksonville
