= Sean West =

American baseball player

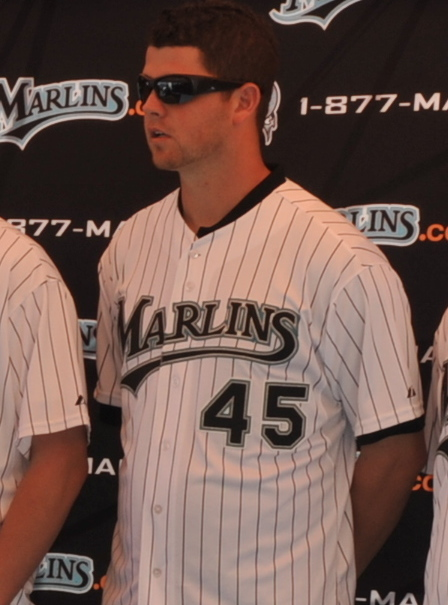
- West with the Florida Marlins in 2011
- Pitcher
- Born: June 15, 1986 (age 38); Houston, Texas, U.S.
- Batted: Right Threw: Left

MLB debut
- May 23, 2009, for the Florida Marlins

Last MLB appearance
- August 14, 2010, for the Florida Marlins

MLB statistics
- Win–loss record: 8–8
- Earned run average: 5.03
- Strikeouts: 78
- Stats at Baseball Reference

Teams
- Florida Marlins (2009–2010)

Sean Edward West (born June 15, 1986) is an American former professional baseball pitcher. He played in Major League Baseball (MLB) for the Florida Marlins.

== Early career ==
West was born in Houston, Texas, and raised in Shreveport, Louisiana.

== Baseball ==
=== High school ===
Sean graduated from Captain Shreve High School in Shreveport, Louisiana in 2005. While there, he went 10-2 with 1.42 ERA in 13 games as a senior, and he struck out 130 batters in 84.0 IP.

=== Florida Marlins ===
West went 8-5 with 3.74 ERA in 21 starts with Greensboro (A) in 2006. During that season, he recorded 102 strikeouts and 40 walks in 120.1 innings. To start the year, he won his first three decisions of season over a span of his first nine starts from April 9 to June 14, including earning a win in his first start of that season on April 9 against Hagerstown, while allowing two hits with four strikeouts in 6.0 innings. West eventually went on the disabled list from April 14 to May 8 with left shoulder tendinitis. He earned wins on May 25 at Greenville (6.0 IP, ER, 4 H, 1 BB, 1 SO) and June 14 at Asheville (6.1 IP, 5 H, 1 BB, 8 SO), before losing four straight starts from June 24 to July 9. However, he went on to win five straight starts from July 25 to August 18, going 5-0 with 3.52 ERA (12 ER, 30.2 IP) over that stretch. West was honored by being named Player of the Week for May 29-June 4, going 0-0 with 0.00 ERA in two starts (13.0 innings). He had .615 winning percentage, which tied him with Daniel Barone (8-5 with Carolina, Jupiter, Greensboro) for second-best among all Marlins minor leaguers; only Renyel Pinto (8-2 with Albuquerque) had a better winning percentage among Marlins farm-hands.

On West's fourth Major League Start against the San Francisco Giants on June 8, 2009, he pitched a 6 inning no hitter until Edgar Renteria hit for a single on the first pitch of the top of the 7th inning. He earned his first career Major League win pitching 8 innings as Randy Johnson opposite for the Giants received his 1st loss after winning his 300th game.

He was sent outright to Triple-A New Orleans Zephyrs on March 14, 2012. He elected free agency following the season on November 2.

=== Washington Nationals ===
On January 4, 2013, West signed a minor league contract with the Washington Nationals. He was released on May 29.
