= Diory Hernández =

Dominican baseball player (born 1984)

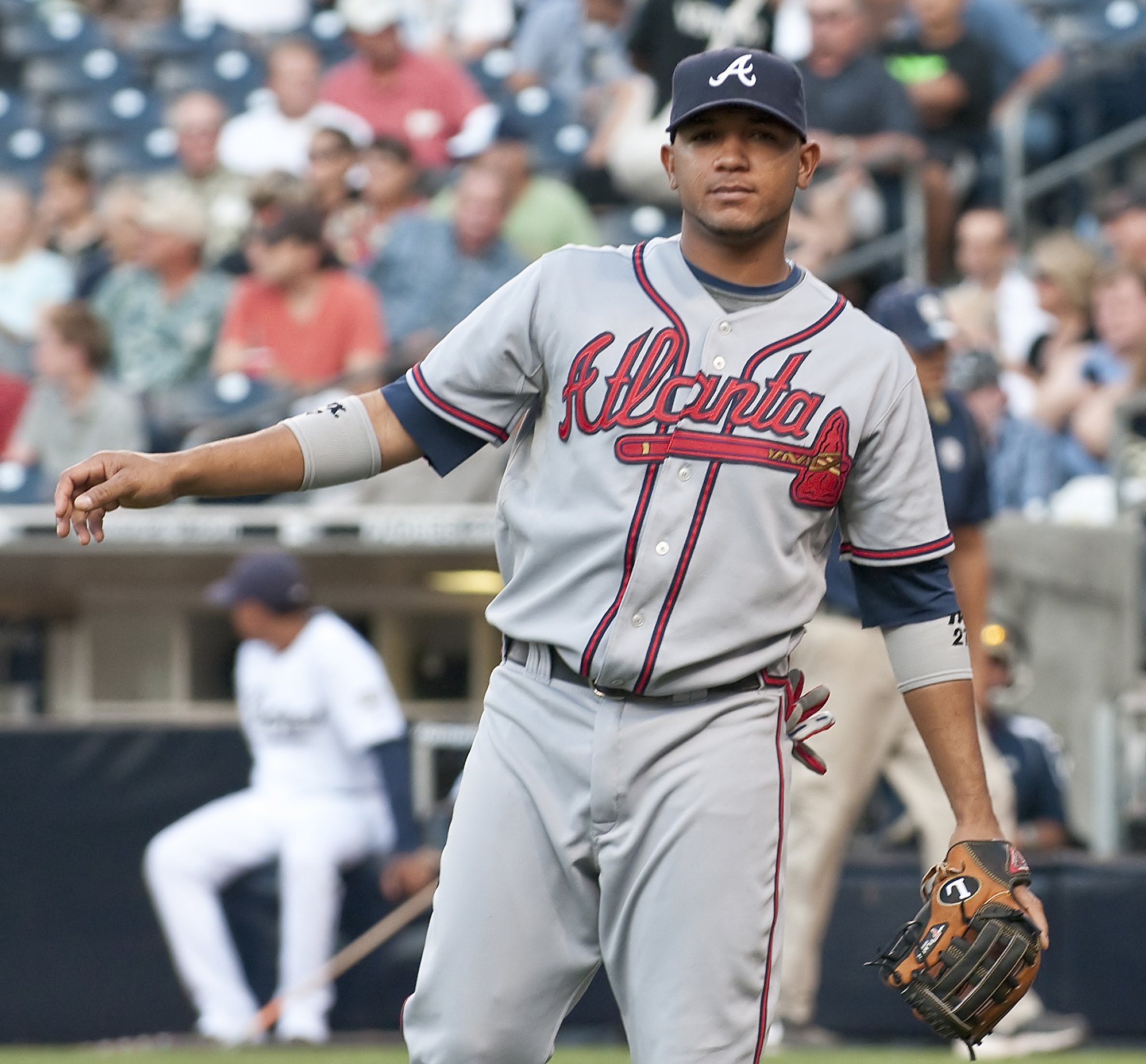
- Hernández with the Atlanta Braves
- Infielder
- Born: April 8, 1984 (age 42); San Pedro de Macorís, Dominican Republic
- Batted: Right Threw: Right

MLB debut
- May 21, 2009, for the Atlanta Braves

Last MLB appearance
- June 20, 2011, for the Atlanta Braves

MLB statistics
- Batting average: .157
- Home runs: 3
- Runs batted in: 11
- Stats at Baseball Reference

Teams
- Atlanta Braves (2009–2011)

Diory Hernández (born April 8, 1984) is a Dominican former professional baseball infielder. He played in Major League Baseball (MLB) for the Atlanta Braves from 2009 to 2011.

== Career ==
=== Atlanta Braves ===
Hernández was promoted to Atlanta from Triple-A Gwinnett after hitting .355 (39-for-110) with 12 doubles in 29 games to replace an injured Omar Infante.

On August 2, 2010, Hernández was promoted to Atlanta from Triple-A Gwinnett to replace injured second baseman Martín Prado.

As of April 7, 2011, Hernández was the starting second baseman for the Gwinnett Braves.

On July 29, 2011, Hernández was designated for assignment.

=== Houston Astros ===
The Houston Astros signed Hernandez to a minor league contract on December 1, 2011. He also received an invitation to spring training. He was released later in the year.

=== Chicago Cubs ===
The Chicago Cubs signed Hernandez to a minor league contract on May 25, 2012. He elected free agency on November 2, 2012.

=== Piratas de Campeche ===
On March 21, 2013, Hernandez signed with the Piratas de Campeche of the Mexican Baseball League. He was released on June 4, 2013.

=== Rieleros de Aguascalientes ===
On June 16, 2015, Hernandez signed with the Rieleros de Aguascalientes of the Mexican Baseball League.

=== Rojos del Águila de Veracruz ===
On July 9, 2015, Hernandez was traded to the Rojos del Águila de Veracruz of the Mexican Baseball League. He was released on October 21, 2015.

=== Return to Aguascalientes ===
On January 27, 2016, Hernandez signed with the Rieleros de Aguascalientes of the Mexican Baseball League. He was released on May 14, 2017.

=== Vaqueros Unión Laguna ===
On June 3, 2017, Hernandez signed with the Vaqueros Unión Laguna of the Mexican Baseball League. He was released on June 26, 2017.

=== Saraperos de Saltillo ===
On April 16, 2018, Hernandez signed with the Saraperos de Saltillo of the Mexican Baseball League. He was released on July 2, 2018.
