= Aníbal Sánchez =

Venezuelan baseball player (born 1984)

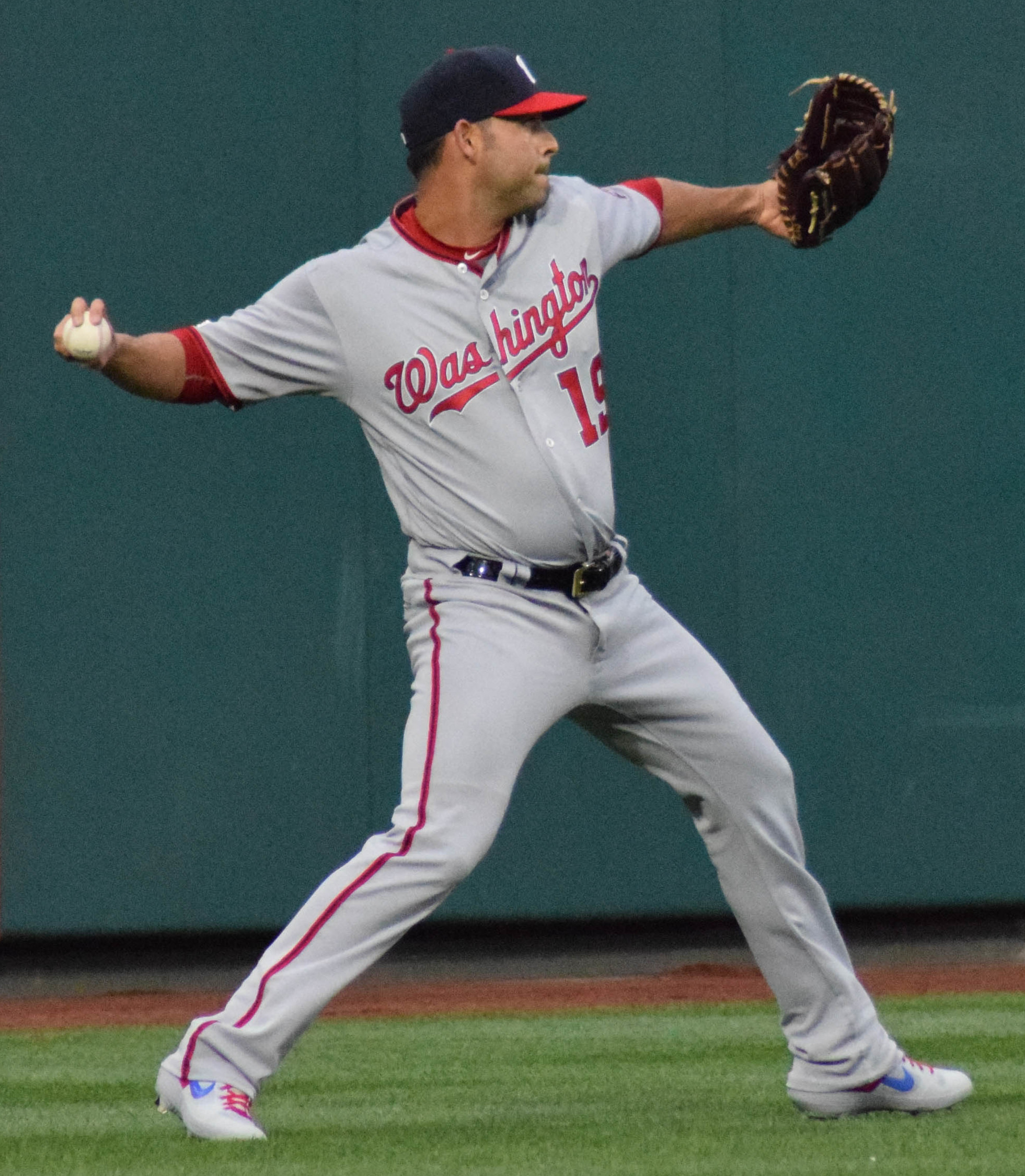
- Sánchez with the Washington Nationals in 2019
- Pitcher
- Born: February 27, 1984 (age 42); Maracay, Venezuela
- Batted: Right Threw: Right

MLB debut
- June 25, 2006, for the Florida Marlins

Last MLB appearance
- October 1, 2022, for the Washington Nationals

MLB statistics
- Win–loss record: 116–119
- Earned run average: 4.06
- Strikeouts: 1,774
- Stats at Baseball Reference

Teams
- Florida / Miami Marlins (2006–2012); Detroit Tigers (2012–2017); Atlanta Braves (2018); Washington Nationals (2019–2020, 2022)

Career highlights and awards
- World Series champion (2019); AL ERA leader (2013); Pitched a no-hitter on September 6, 2006

Aníbal Alejandro Sánchez Jr. (Spanish: [aˈniβal ˈsantʃes]; born February 27, 1984) is a Venezuelan former professional baseball pitcher. He made his Major League Baseball (MLB) debut in 2006 with the Florida Marlins and also played for the Detroit Tigers, Atlanta Braves, and Washington Nationals. On September 6, 2006, in his 13th career Major League start, Sánchez pitched a no-hitter against the Arizona Diamondbacks.

== Career ==
=== Boston Red Sox ===
Sánchez was signed by the Boston Red Sox as an international free agent in 2001. After playing in the Venezuelan Summer League for two seasons, Sánchez suffered an elbow injury that required surgery to move his elbow ligament, causing him to miss the entire 2003 season.

In the following year, he returned to the mound, this time making his debut on American soil with the short-season Single-A Lowell Spinners. In 15 starts, Sánchez posted a 3–4 record with a 1.77 earned run average (ERA), and by the end of the year was widely considered one of Boston's top pitching prospects. After the 2004 season, Baseball America named Sánchez Boston's fifth-best prospect, behind shortstop Hanley Ramírez, outfielder Brandon Moss, and pitchers Jonathan Papelbon and Jon Lester. By 2006, Ramírez, Papelbon, and Lester had all played in the majors; Moss was selected as the Portland Sea Dogs most valuable player in 2006.

2005 saw the young prospect starting the season off in Wilmington, Boston's High-A ball affiliate. After posting a 6–1 record with a 2.40 ERA, receiving a selection for the All-Star Futures Game, and making the Carolina League All-Star team, he was promoted to the Double-A Portland Sea Dogs. Sánchez got off to a hot start there, but tired toward the end of the season, creating some concern about his durability. Still, Sánchez put up a 3.45 ERA over 11 starts in his first year in Double-A; at 21 years old, he was still one of the youngest players in his league.

=== Florida Marlins ===
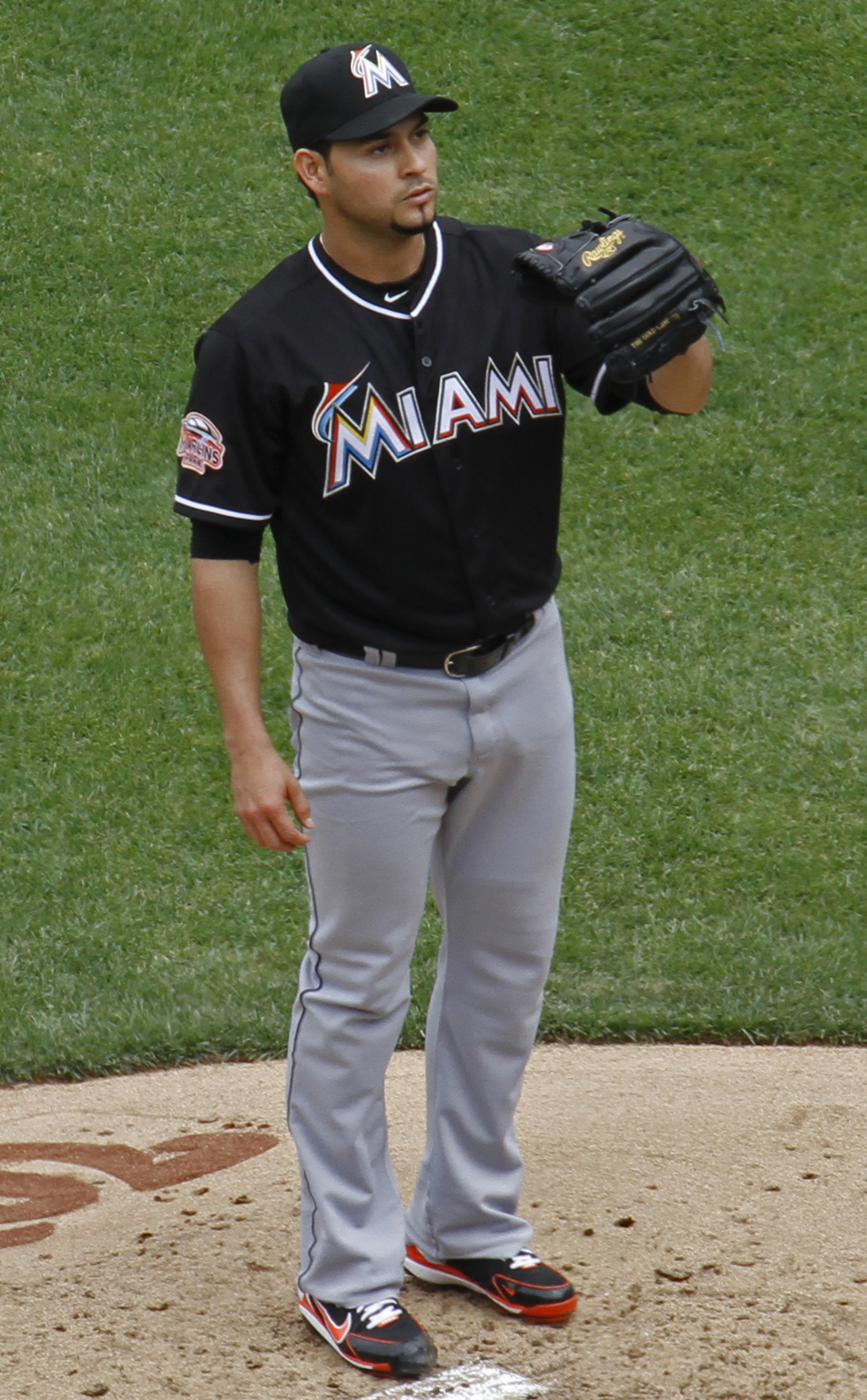
Sánchez with the Miami Marlins in 2012

At the end of the 2005 season, Boston traded Sánchez along with Hanley Ramírez, Jesús Delgado, and Harvey García to the Florida Marlins, in the same transaction that brought Josh Beckett, Guillermo Mota, and Mike Lowell to the Red Sox. In addition to Beckett and Lowell, the Marlins traded several of their other star players after the 2005 season, including Carlos Delgado, Juan Pierre, Paul Lo Duca, and Luis Castillo, for mainly minor-league prospects. Baseball America ranked Sánchez third in the Marlins system (after Jeremy Hermida and Ramirez) and 40th overall in the major leagues at the start of the 2006 season.

The Marlins started six rookies in their Opening Day lineup in 2006, but elected to have Sánchez return to Class AA to start the season with the Carolina Mudcats. Sánchez made his first 15 starts in 2006 with Mudcats, for whom he posted a 3–6 record with a 3.15 ERA. While with Carolina, he pitched two complete games, one of which was a seven-hit shutout.

On June 25, he was called up to the majors to start the second half of a doubleheader in Yankee Stadium against the Yankees. Sánchez's major league debut was a strong one, as he allowed seven hits and no runs in 5 2/3 innings against the Yankees. He then turned the game over to his bullpen, which blanked the Yankees the rest of the way, shutting out the Yankees for the first time all year, 5–0. Sánchez became just the second visiting starter in the past decade to win his big-league debut at Yankee Stadium (fellow Venezuelan Gustavo Chacín of the Toronto Blue Jays, who beat the Yankees in September 2004, is the other). On July 14, the 22-year-old Sánchez started against and defeated Houston Astros pitcher Roger Clemens, who made his MLB debut when Sánchez was just three months old.

On September 6, 2006, Sánchez no-hit the Arizona Diamondbacks 2–0 at Dolphin Stadium. He walked four batters and struck out six, throwing 103 pitches. The Marlins, who used 21 rookies during the 2006 season, started six in Sánchez's no-hitter, setting the record for most rookies to play for the winning team in a no-hitter. The no-hitter was also the first thrown since Randy Johnson's perfect game on May 18, 2004, as 2005 saw no pitcher throw a no-hitter.

On September 27, Sánchez earned his tenth win against the Cincinnati Reds, joining teammates Josh Johnson, Scott Olsen, and Ricky Nolasco in the first set of four rookie teammates in MLB history to record ten or more wins in their rookie seasons. Marlins left-hander Dontrelle Willis had a record of 12–12, so with Sánchez's tenth win, the Marlins had their first set of five pitchers with ten or more wins in franchise history. He finished his first season with the Marlins with a record of 10–3 and an ERA of 2.83 in 18 major-league games (17 starts).

Before their game against the Philadelphia Phillies on September 30, the Marlins presented Sánchez with the pitching rubber and home plate used in his no-hitter. The Miami-Dade County Office of the Mayor and Board of County Commissioners officially named September 30, 2006, Aníbal Sánchez Day.

==== 2007 ====
Sánchez suffered shoulder problems during spring training but still started 2007 with the Marlins, going 2–1 with a 4.80 ERA in six starts. When reliever Jorge Julio returned to the team from the disabled list on May 4, the Marlins demoted Sánchez to Class AAA Albuquerque, citing his struggles with control. On June 21, it was reported that his season was over after having Dr. James Andrews perform surgery to repair a tear in his labrum.

==== 2008 ====
On July 31, 2008, Sánchez pitched his first Major League game in almost 15 months against the Colorado Rockies. He had a solid outing and pitched 5 2/3 innings while giving up two runs on six hits and striking out four. The Marlins went on to win that game 12–2, with Sánchez collecting his first win of the season.

==== 2009–2010 ====
Another shortened season limited Sánchez to 16 starts in 2009, but he saw improvements in his stats, finishing with a 3.87 ERA and his lowest WHIP and opponent's batting average since his rookie year.

2010 saw Sánchez finally get through a whole season, as he was the only Marlins' starter to stay in the starting rotation for the entire season. He set a career high in wins with 13, with a still-declining ERA of 3.55 and 195 innings pitched.

==== 2011 ====
On April 22, he took another no-hitter into the ninth inning against the Colorado Rockies before giving up a hit to Dexter Fowler. Sánchez finished the game for his fourth career complete game. Three starts later, Sánchez again took a no-hitter into the seventh inning against the Washington Nationals before losing it. Sánchez would also throw another complete game on May 26 against the San Francisco Giants, a 1–0 win that gave Sánchez his third career shutout. Sánchez would throw a one-hitter against the Pittsburgh Pirates, his fourth career shutout and second of the season, in early September. After starting the season 6–2, a lack of run support and injuries from the rest of the team led resulted in a 2–7 finish to the season.

==== 2012 ====
Aníbal made 19 starts for the Miami Marlins in 2012, compiling a 5–7 record with a 3.94 ERA.

=== Detroit Tigers ===
==== Rest of 2012 ====
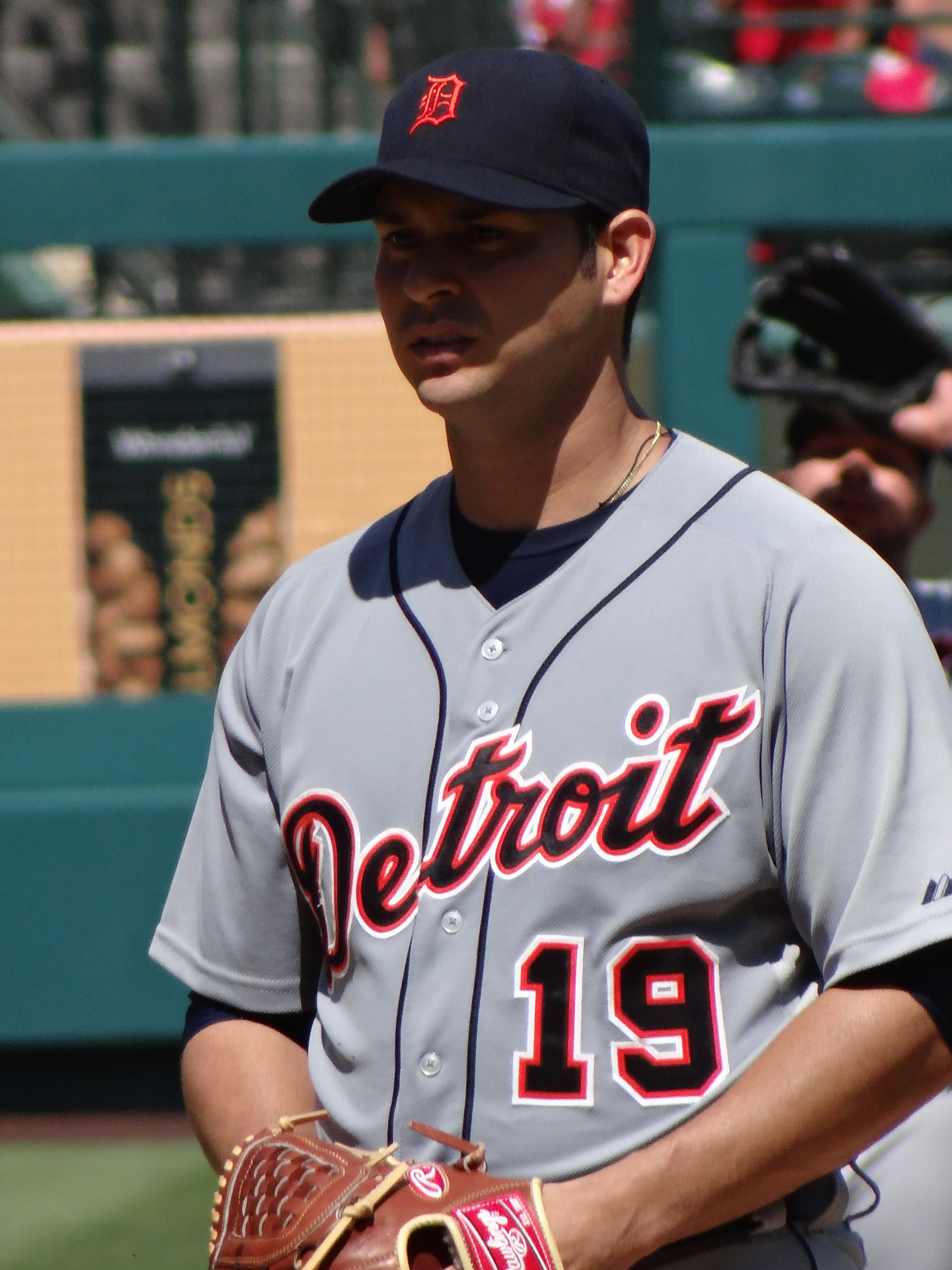
Aníbal Sánchez with the Detroit Tigers in 2012

On July 23, 2012, Sánchez was traded to the Detroit Tigers along with Omar Infante for Jacob Turner, Rob Brantly, Brian Flynn and a draft pick. In 12 starts for the Tigers, he went 4–6 with a 3.74 ERA. The Tigers won the AL Central division, giving Sánchez a chance to play in the first postseason of his career.

In the 2012 ALDS against the Oakland Athletics, Sánchez started and lost Game 3 despite giving up two runs in 6 1/3 innings, as the Tigers offense did not score in the game. In Game 2 of the 2012 ALCS, Sánchez shut out the New York Yankees on three hits over seven innings, and earned the win in a 3–0 game. In Game 3 of the 2012 World Series, Sánchez struck out eight over seven innings, but took the loss in the Tigers 2–0 defeat to the San Francisco Giants. Overall, he went 1–2 in the 2012 postseason with a 1.77 ERA.

On December 14, 2012, Sánchez agreed to a five-year, $80 million contract to remain with the Tigers. The deal includes $75 million in salary for five years, plus a team option in the sixth year for an additional $16 million, making the total value of the contract worth a potential $91 million. If the Tigers did not exercise the option, they would have owed Sánchez a $5 million buyout fee.

==== 2013 ====
Sánchez made his 2013 regular season debut on April 3, as the starting pitcher in the Tigers' second game of the season. On April 26, during a 10–0 victory at Comerica Park against the Atlanta Braves, Sánchez set a Detroit Tigers franchise record with 17 strikeouts, breaking the previous team record of 16 set in 1972 by Mickey Lolich. Amazingly, Sánchez set the record in only 8 innings pitched, as he was removed from the game prior to the ninth inning after throwing 121 pitches. On May 24, Sánchez made a bid for his second career no-hitter. He did not allow a hit for 8 1/3 innings against the Minnesota Twins, before finally surrendering a single to Joe Mauer. He finished the game to earn a shutout in the Tigers 6–0 win.

On September 11, Sánchez won his 14th game of the 2013 campaign in a 1–0 defeat of the Chicago White Sox to establish a new career high for wins in a season. He finished the regular season with a 14–8 record, while fanning 202 batters in 182 innings pitched. His 2.57 ERA led all American League starters. He also allowed the fewest home runs per nine innings in the AL (0.4).

In Game 1 of the American League Championship Series on October 12, Sánchez struck out four Boston Red Sox batters in the first inning, due to a wild pitch on one of the strikeouts. He became just the second player in Major League history to accomplish this feat in the postseason, following Orval Overall in the 1908 World Series. Sánchez went on to pitch six no-hit innings with 12 strikeouts and six walks. He was lifted prior to the seventh inning due to throwing 116 pitches, but earned the win in a 1–0 Tigers victory. He was not as sharp in Game 5 of the series, surrendering nine hits and four runs (three earned) in six innings, as the Tigers lost 4–3.

==== 2014 ====
Sánchez entered 2014 as the Tigers' #3 starter. On April 26, he was placed on the disabled list due to a laceration on his right middle finger. He returned successfully to the rotation with a win over the Boston Red Sox on May 18. On June 30, Sánchez struck out Alberto Callaspo of the Oakland Athletics for his 1,000th career strikeout.

Sánchez left an August 8 game against the Toronto Blue Jays with discomfort in his side. The injury was later diagnosed as a strained pectoral muscle, sending Sánchez to the disabled list for the second time this season.

==== 2015 ====
Sánchez began 2015 as the Tigers' #2 starter, due to the offseason loss of Max Scherzer and an injury to Justin Verlander. He had a rough start to the 2015 season, surrendering 13 home runs through his first 12 starts (after giving up just four homers in 22 games during the 2014 season). He showed signs of turning the season around in June, allowing no runs in back-to-back starts against the Chicago Cubs and Cincinnati Reds. In the latter game on June 15, Sánchez threw a two-hit shutout in a 6–0 Tigers win. It was the seventh shutout of his career, and his first complete game since May 24, 2013. Sánchez allowed no walks, struck out seven, and faced just one batter over the minimum.

On August 20, Sánchez was placed on the disabled list with inflammation in his right rotator cuff. He would not return for the remainder of 2015. Prior to being placed on the DL, he posted a 10–10 record, with a 4.99 ERA in 25 starts, with only one quality start over his last 10 starts. He surrendered a career-high 29 home runs, which also led the American League despite his shortened season.

==== 2016 ====
After compiling a 3–6 record and a 6.67 ERA in his first 11 starts, Sánchez was demoted to the Tiger bullpen following a May 31 start against the Los Angeles Angels. Sanchez returned to the starting rotation on July 5 in Cleveland against the Cleveland Indians throwing 4 1/3 innings and earning the loss. He pitched in the starting rotation for much of the remaining season, due to injuries to other Tiger starters. Sánchez struggled for a second straight season, posting a 7–13 record with an ERA of 5.87, while allowing 30 home runs, a new career high.

==== 2017 ====
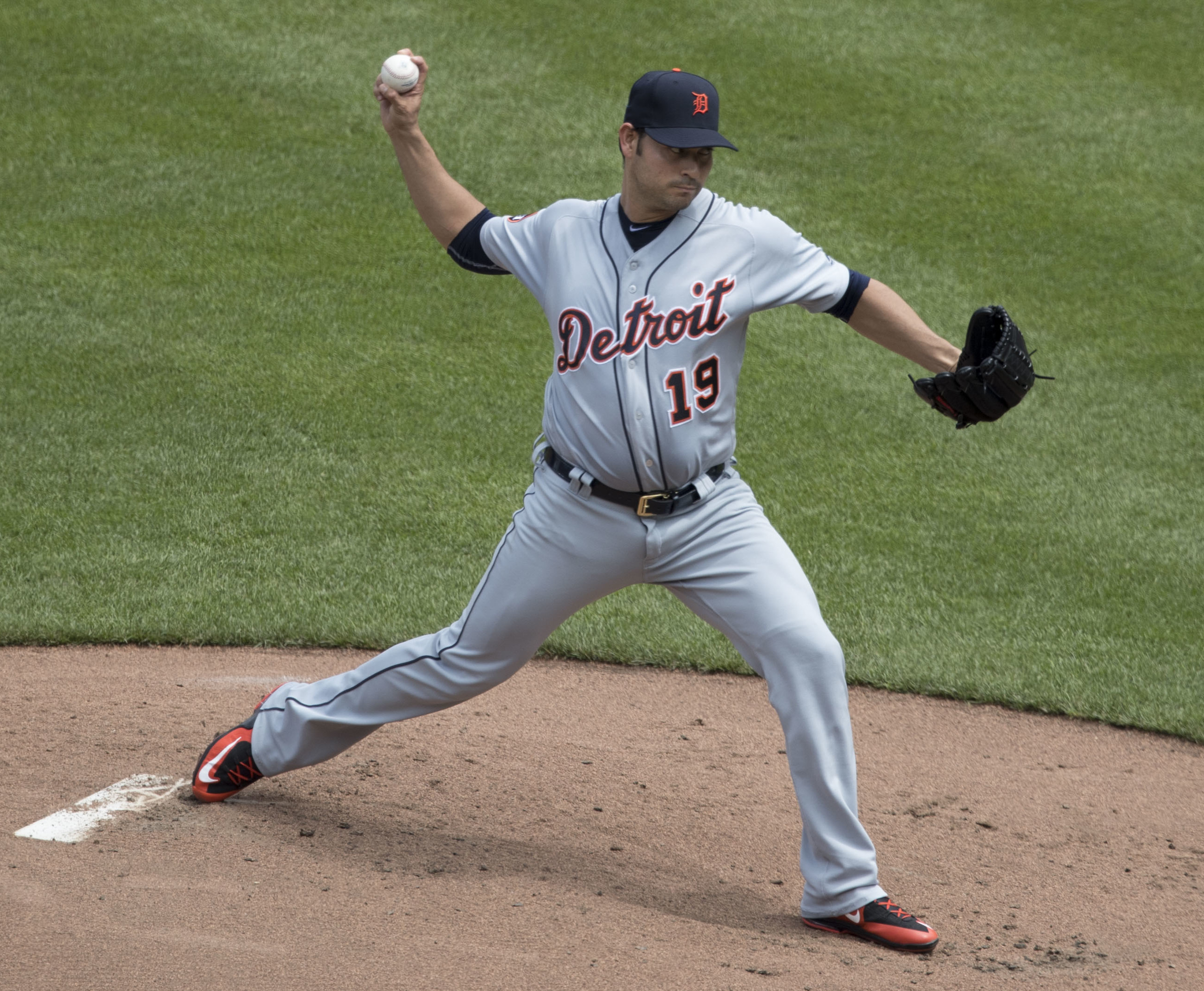
Sanchez in 2017

Sánchez began the 2017 season in the Tigers bullpen, filling a long relief role. In his first 11 appearances of the year, Sánchez had a bad showing as his ERA bloated to 9.00. On May 22, he was demoted to the Triple-A Toledo Mud Hens. The Tigers recalled Sánchez on June 18, and he made a start the next day against the Seattle Mariners. On August 18, he was placed on the 10-day DL with hamstring tightness after leaving the game in the third inning a day earlier. He became a free agent following the season.

=== Minnesota Twins ===
On February 20, 2018, Sánchez signed a one-year, $2.5 million deal with the Minnesota Twins that was conditional on making the club out of spring training. He was released by the Twins on March 11.

=== Atlanta Braves ===
On March 16, 2018, Sánchez signed a minor league contract with the Atlanta Braves. On April 2, Sánchez's contract was selected by the Braves. He landed on the disabled list on April 18 after suffering a hamstring injury. After missing more than a month, he was activated off the disabled list on May 29. Sánchez had his best season, statistically, since 2013, finishing with a record of 7–6 with a 2.83 ERA in 24 starts. He became a free agent following the season.

=== Washington Nationals ===
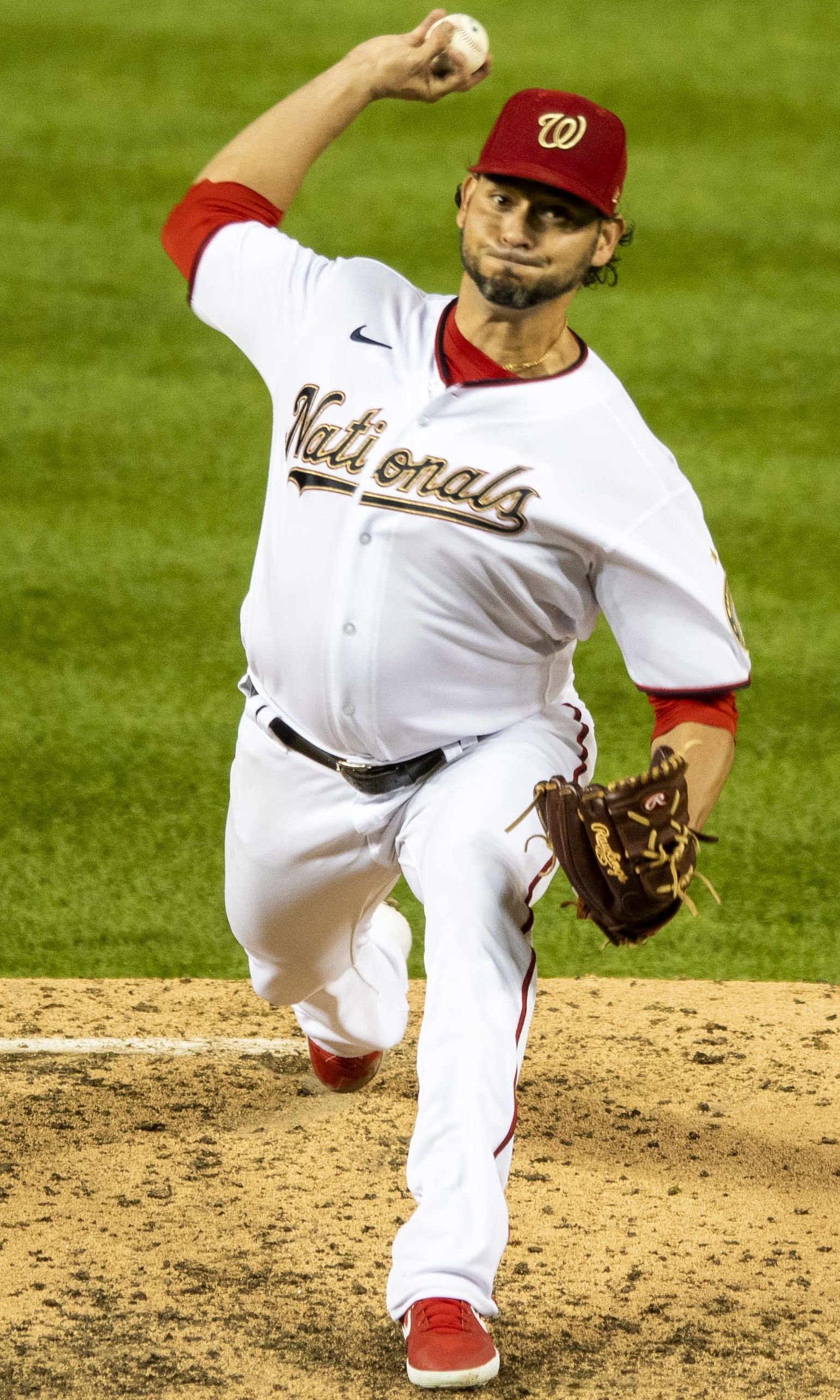
Sánchez with Nationals in 2020

Coming off a productive bounceback season with the Braves, Sánchez signed a $19 million two-year deal with the division rival Washington Nationals on December 27, 2018. The deal also includes a club option for the 2021 season. Sánchez earned his 100th career win on June 16, 2019, against the Arizona Diamondbacks In 2019 he was 11–8 with a 3.85 ERA in 30 starts, and led all NL pitchers in errors with four.

In Game 1 of the 2019 National League Championship Series against the St. Louis Cardinals, Sánchez took a no-hitter into the 8th inning before allowing a pinch-hit single to José Martínez with two outs. Sánchez became the 6th pitcher in MLB postseason history to carry a no-hit bid for at least 7 2/3 innings. With teammate Max Scherzer losing his bid for a no-hitter in the 7th inning the next day, Sánchez and Scherzer repeated a feat they accomplished in Games 1 and 2 of the 2013 American League Championship Series. No other pair of starting pitchers has ever held the same team hitless through the first five innings of consecutive postseason games; Sánchez and Scherzer have now done it twice.

In 2020 he was 4–5 with a 6.62 ERA. He led the NL in earned runs allowed (39). He became a free agent after the season.

On February 23, 2021, it was reported that Sánchez had turned down "multiple" major league offers since he held a January showcase, stating that he was concerned over COVID-19 and the protocols that surround it. Although a report stated that Sánchez was planning to sign with a team in late April, Sánchez later stated in mid-July that he was no longer planning to pitch in 2021. Sánchez had received some major league offers, but none were at his desired level, as he was seeking an incentive-laden deal.

On March 13, 2022, Sánchez resigned a minor league deal with the Washington Nationals. On April 4, Sánchez had his contract purchased to the big league roster. However, he did not make his first scheduled start due to a neck issue and was placed on the 60-day injured list on May 3. He was activated on July 14 to start against the Atlanta Braves. In 14 starts for Washington, Sánchez logged a 4-6 record and 4.28 ERA with 48 strikeouts in 69 1/3 innings pitched.

On May 16, 2023, Sánchez announced his retirement from professional baseball via Instagram.

== Pitching style ==
Sánchez throws five pitches, giving him a variety of weapons to use against right-handed and left-handed hitters. He throws a four-seam fastball in the 88–94 MPH range, a two-seam sinker with similar velocity, a slider in the mid-80s, a changeup with strong tailing action in the 79–85 MPH range, and an occasional curveball in the mid- to upper-70s Teammates Max Scherzer and Justin Verlander have both claimed in interviews that Sánchez actually throws two different changeups: the standard one in the 79–85 mph range, and a slower one in the mid-60s to low-70s that they call the "butterfly pitch". Aníbal is known for keeping hitters off-balance with his willingness to throw any pitch at any time in the count. Baseball writer Mike Axisa stated in 2013, "Rotation mates Max Scherzer and Justin Verlander overpower hitters. Sánchez confuses them."

== See also ==
- List of Major League Baseball no-hitters
- List of Major League Baseball single-inning strikeout leaders

Preceded by Randy Johnson	No-hitter pitcher September 6, 2006	Succeeded by Mark Buehrle
