= Reid Gorecki =

American baseball player (born 1980)

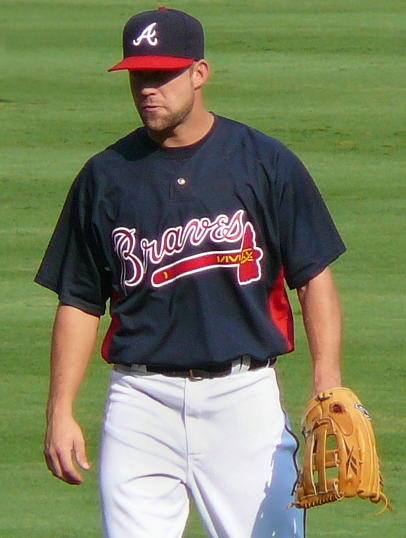
- Gorecki with the Atlanta Braves in 2009
- Outfielder
- Born: December 22, 1980 (age 45); Queens, New York, U.S.
- Batted: Right Threw: Right

MLB debut
- August 17, 2009, for the Atlanta Braves

Last MLB appearance
- October 4, 2009, for the Atlanta Braves

MLB statistics
- Batting average: .200
- Home runs: 0
- Runs batted in: 3
- Stats at Baseball Reference

Teams
- Atlanta Braves (2009)

Reid Evan Gorecki (born December 22, 1980) is an American former Major League Baseball outfielder who played for the Atlanta Braves in 2009.

== Amateur career ==
Gorecki grew up in East Rockaway, New York, and graduated from Kellenberg Memorial High School. He attended the University of Delaware, and in 2000 he played collegiate summer baseball with the Harwich Mariners of the Cape Cod Baseball League.

== Minor league career ==
Gorecki was drafted in the 13th round of the 2002 Major League Baseball draft by the St. Louis Cardinals and started as a rookie in the Low-A New York–Penn League. While in the Penn League he played with top prospect Herb Green. He also spent time in High-A Palm Beach, Double-A Springfield, and Triple-A Memphis before being called up to MLB as a 40-man roster addition. In 2008, he was released from the Cardinals organization due to injuries. On May 10, 2008, he was signed by the Atlanta Braves as a minor league free agent, and assigned to the Mississippi Braves of the Double-A Southern League. Gorecki re-signed with the Braves after the 2008 season.

== Major league career ==
=== Atlanta Braves ===
On August 17, 2009, the Braves called him up to the majors. On August 19, 2009, Gorecki recorded his first major league hit and run batted in against his hometown team, the New York Mets.

=== New York Yankees ===
Gorecki was granted free agency at the end of the 2009 season. On January 11, 2010, Gorecki signed a minor league contract with the New York Yankees with an invitation to spring training. In 107 games in the minors split between Double-A Trenton and Triple-A Scranton/Wilkes-Barre, he hit .254 with 5 home runs, 45 runs batted in and 20 stolen bases.

=== Long Island Ducks/Camden Riversharks/Sugar Land Skeeters ===
After not playing professionally in 2011, Gorecki played in the Atlantic League during 2012, first with Long Island, then with Camden. In 108 games, he hit .271 with 11 home runs, 51 runs batted in and 27 stolen bases. On June 7, 2013, Gorecki signed with Sugar Land of the Atlantic League.

== Oil City Sports ==
After retiring from professional baseball, Gorecki opened up a baseball and softball training complex in Oceanside, New York called Oil City Sports, so named because the facility is in an area by the shore known for its Oil Companies. The year round complex is used for baseball training, group and private lessons, and travel team development in the Long Island area.
