= Tim Wood (baseball) =

American baseball player (born 1982)

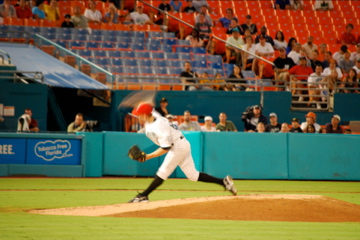
- Wood pitching for the Marlins
- Pitcher
- Born: November 16, 1982 (age 43); Tucson, Arizona, U.S.
- Batted: Right Threw: Right

MLB debut
- June 25, 2009, for the Florida Marlins

Last MLB appearance
- July 1, 2011, for the Pittsburgh Pirates

MLB statistics
- Win–loss record: 1–4
- Earned run average: 4.50
- Strikeouts: 28
- Stats at Baseball Reference

Teams
- Florida Marlins (2009–2010); Pittsburgh Pirates (2011)

Timothy Dayle Wood (born November 16, 1982) is an American former professional baseball pitcher. He pitched in Major League Baseball (MLB) for the Florida Marlins and Pittsburgh Pirates.

== Baseball career ==
Wood was drafted by the Montreal Expos in the 21st round of the 2001 Major League Baseball draft out of Sabino High School, but did not sign. He was drafted by the Florida Marlins in the 44th round of the 2002 Major League Baseball draft out of Pima Community College.

=== Florida Marlins ===
Wood signed with the Florida Marlins organization after being drafted in 2002. He was brought up to the major leagues on June 4, 2009, but was optioned back to the minors on June 7 without appearing in a game. The Marlins called him up once again on June 21. Wood made his major league debut June 25, 2009, pitching 2 scoreless innings against the Baltimore Orioles. The first batter he faced, Robert Andino, lined out to second base. On September 12, he recorded the only win of his career, pitching 1 1/3 scoreless innings in an 11-3 win over the Washington Nationals.

On April 7, 2010, Wood recorded the only save of his MLB career. He pitched the 10th inning to close out a 7-6 victory over the New York Mets.

=== Washington Nationals ===
The Washington Nationals signed Wood in November 2010. The Nationals released Wood in March 2011.

=== Pittsburgh Pirates ===
The Pittsburgh Pirates signed Wood in April 2011. On June 10, 2011, the Pirates purchased Wood's contract. He was designated for assignment on August 12, after making 13 appearances, recording a 5.63 ERA in eight innings. He was traded to the Texas Rangers on August 18, in exchange for cash considerations.

=== Texas Rangers ===
The Texas Rangers acquired Wood from the Pittsburgh Pirates on August 18, in exchange for cash considerations. He became a free agent at the end of the 2011 season.

=== Return to the Pirates ===
In November 2011, Wood signed a minor league contract with the Pittsburgh Pirates. In 54 games for the Pirates' Triple-A affiliate Indianapolis, Wood had a 2.19 ERA with 21 saves while striking out 67 in 70 innings.

=== Minnesota Twins ===
On November 10, 2012, Wood signed a minor league deal with the Minnesota Twins with an invitation to spring training and was to make the team. The club then signed him to a 1-year, $675,000 deal to avoid losing him in the Rule 5 Draft. He was released on August 28, 2013.
