= Ricky Nolasco =

American baseball player (born 1982)

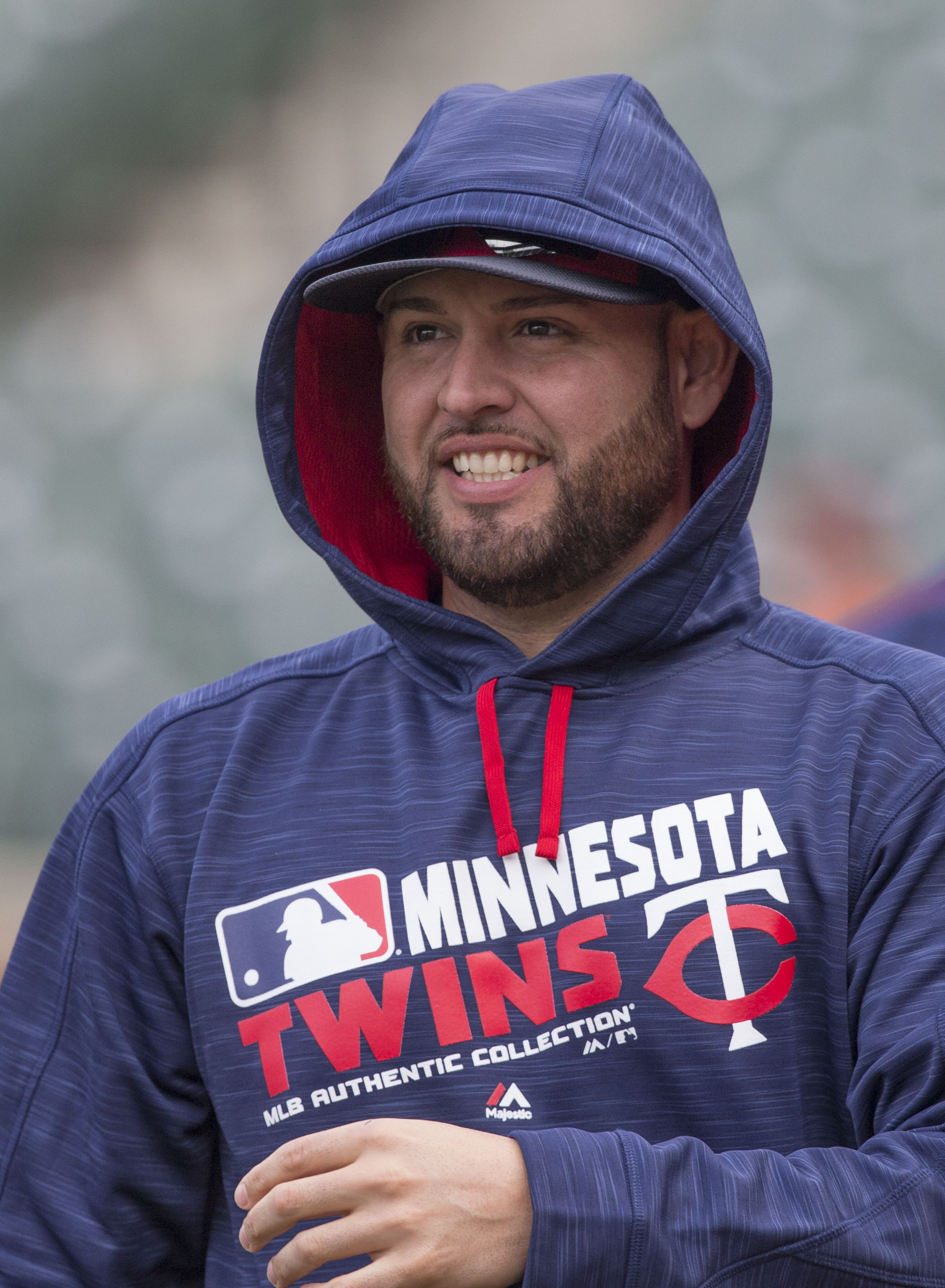
- Nolasco with the Minnesota Twins
- Pitcher
- Born: December 13, 1982 (age 43); Corona, California, U.S.
- Batted: Right Threw: Right

MLB debut
- April 5, 2006, for the Florida Marlins

Last MLB appearance
- September 30, 2017, for the Los Angeles Angels

MLB statistics
- Win–loss record: 114–118
- Earned run average: 4.56
- Strikeouts: 1,513
- Stats at Baseball Reference

Teams
- Florida / Miami Marlins (2006–2013); Los Angeles Dodgers (2013); Minnesota Twins (2014–2016); Los Angeles Angels (2016–2017)

Carlos Enrique Nolasco (born December 13, 1982) is an American former professional baseball pitcher. He played in Major League Baseball (MLB) for the Florida/Miami Marlins, Los Angeles Dodgers, Minnesota Twins, and Los Angeles Angels. He is of Mexican descent.

== Early life ==
Born in Corona, California to Mexican parents, Nolasco attended Rialto High School in Rialto, California. He graduated in 2001 and was drafted out of high school in the fourth round of the 2001 Major League Baseball draft by the Chicago Cubs.

== Professional career ==
=== Chicago Cubs ===
Nolasco began his professional career in the Rookie-level Arizona League with the Arizona League Cubs. In five games with the team, including four starts, he recorded a 1–0 win–loss record with an earned-run average (ERA) of 1.50. He spent the 2002 season with the Boise Hawks of the Low–A Northwest League, earning a record of 7–2 with an ERA of 2.48 in 15 starts. The next season, Nolasco was assigned to the Daytona Cubs of the High–A Florida State League, where he went 11–5 with a 2.96 ERA in 26 starts.

Nolasco started the 2004 season in the Double-A Southern League with the West Tenn Diamond Jaxx. A month into the season, on May 16, he was called up to the Triple-A Iowa Cubs of the Pacific Coast League. He made nine starts for Iowa, accumulating a record of 2–3 with an ERA of 9.30 before being sent back down to Double–A on June 28. Nolasco spent the rest of the season there; he finished the season with a record of 6-4 and an ERA of 3.70 in 19 starts throughout both stints with the Diamond Jaxx during the 2004 season. Nolasco then spent the entire 2005 season in Double–A, as he achieved an impressive 14–3 record with an ERA of 2.89 in 27 starts. Nolasco received the Southern League's Most Outstanding Pitcher Award for the 2005 season.

=== Florida/Miami Marlins ===
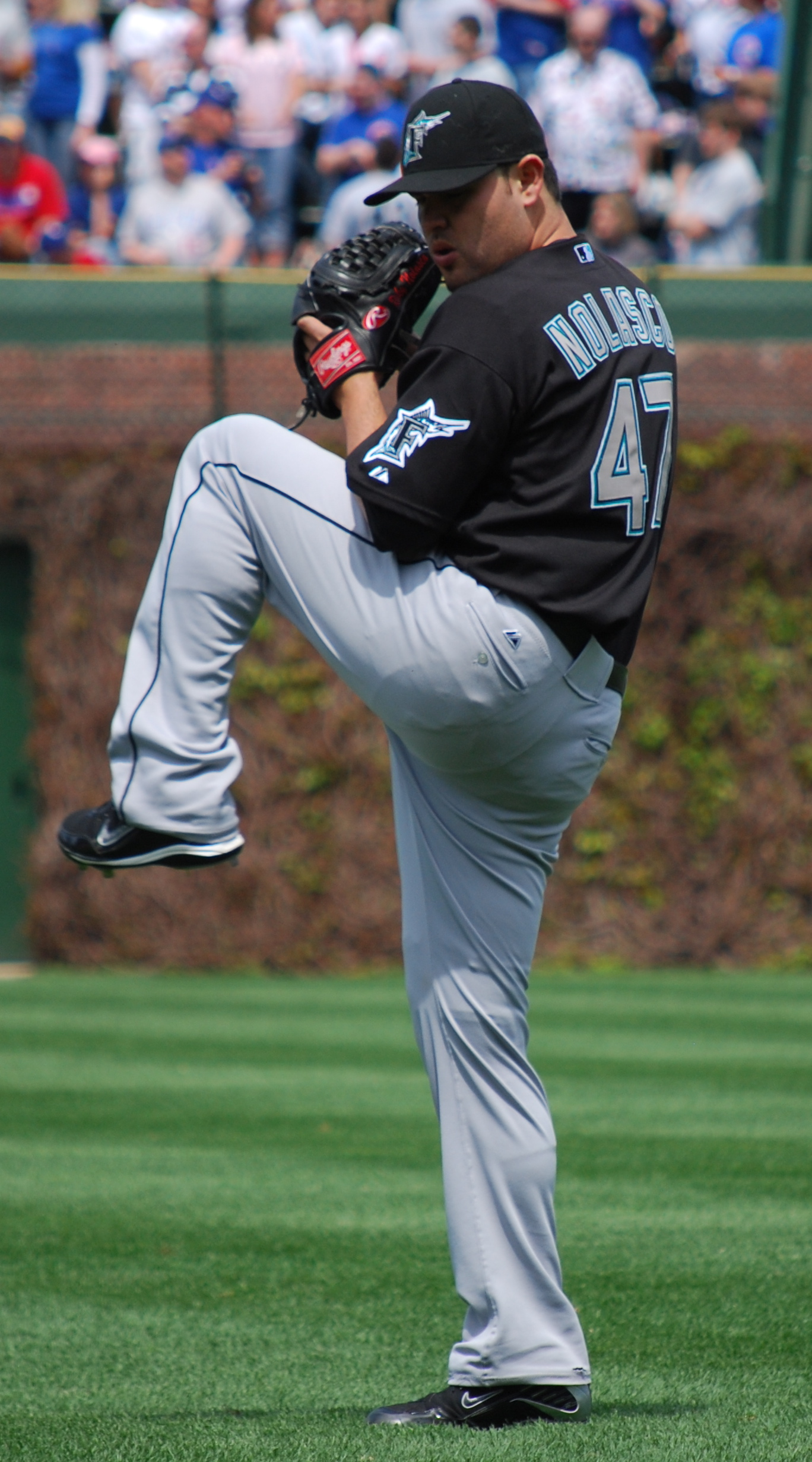
Nolasco during his tenure with the Florida Marlins in 2009

The Florida Marlins acquired Nolasco, Sergio Mitre, and Renyel Pinto from the Cubs for Juan Pierre on December 7, 2005. He made the opening day roster in 2006 and made his debut with 3 scoreless innings of relief on April 5 against the Houston Astros. He struck out Jason Lane for his first Major League strikeout. He recorded his first win with 2 innings of relief against the Cubs on April 26. He made his first start on May 22, also against the Cubs, and allowed 1 run in 7 innings to get the win. Nolasco went on to finish the 2006 season with a 4.82 ERA, 140 innings pitched, 41 walks, 99 strikeouts, a 1.41 WHIP, and an 11–11 record in 35 games. (22 starts)

In 2007, Nolasco was 1–2 with a 5.48 ERA in 5 appearances (4 starts) while spending most of the year recovering from an injury. He started the 2008 season as a middle reliever, but quickly found his way to the top of the rotation as Florida's top starting pitcher. On August 19, 2008, he pitched a two-hitter against the San Francisco Giants. With one out in the 9th inning, he gave up a double; the only other hit given up by him was a ball deflected off the glove of first baseman Mike Jacobs. Nolasco also had a two-run double in the game. Nolasco won 15 games in 2008, putting him in the top 5 in wins in the National League. In addition to a career high 15 wins, Nolasco also recorded career bests in ERA (3.52) and WHIP (1.10), struck out 186 batters, and walked just 42 batters in a career high 212.1 innings pitched.

Nolasco was named the 2009 Opening Day starter, throwing in six innings and win against the Washington Nationals. In his first 9 starts in 2009, he was 2–5 with a 9.07 ERA, earning him a demotion to the minor leagues. On June 7, 2009, Nolasco was recalled from the minor leagues. He went onto finish the month of June with 3 wins and 1 loss while recording a 1.91 ERA in 5 starts during the stretch. On September 30, 2009, Nolasco struck out 16 batters, breaking A. J. Burnett's record for 14 strikeouts in a single game for the Florida Marlins. Nolasco finished the 2009 season with a 13–9 record, a 5.06 ERA, a 1.25 WHIP, and a career high 195 strikeouts in 185 innings pitched.

In 2010, Nolasco was 14–9 in 26 starts with a 4.51 ERA, a 1.28 WHIP, 147 strikeouts, and just 33 walks in 157.2 innings pitched. He missed the entire month of September after undergoing season ending surgery to repair a torn meniscus on his right knee. In December 2010, Nolasco agreed to a 3-year, $26.5 million contract extension with the Marlins to remain with the team through 2013.

On August 23, 2011, Nolasco became the Marlins franchise leader in strikeouts, overtaking Dontrelle Willis. Nolasco finished the 2011 season 10–12 in 33 starts with a 4.67 ERA, a 1.40 WHIP, 148 strikeouts, and 44 walks in 206 innings pitched while allowing a league leading 244 hits. On May 22, 2012, Nolasco won his 69th game, overtaking Willis' club record of 68 wins with the Marlins. He finished the 2012 season with a 4.48 ERA in 191 innings pitched, with 47 walks, 125 strikeouts, a 1.37 WHIP, and a 12–13 record in 31 starts.

In 2013, Nolasco was 5–8 with a 3.85 ERA in his first 18 starts of the season for the Marlins. Despite an ERA below 4, Nolasco had more losses than wins during that stretch due to the fact the Marlins were worst in the league in runs scored.

=== Los Angeles Dodgers ===
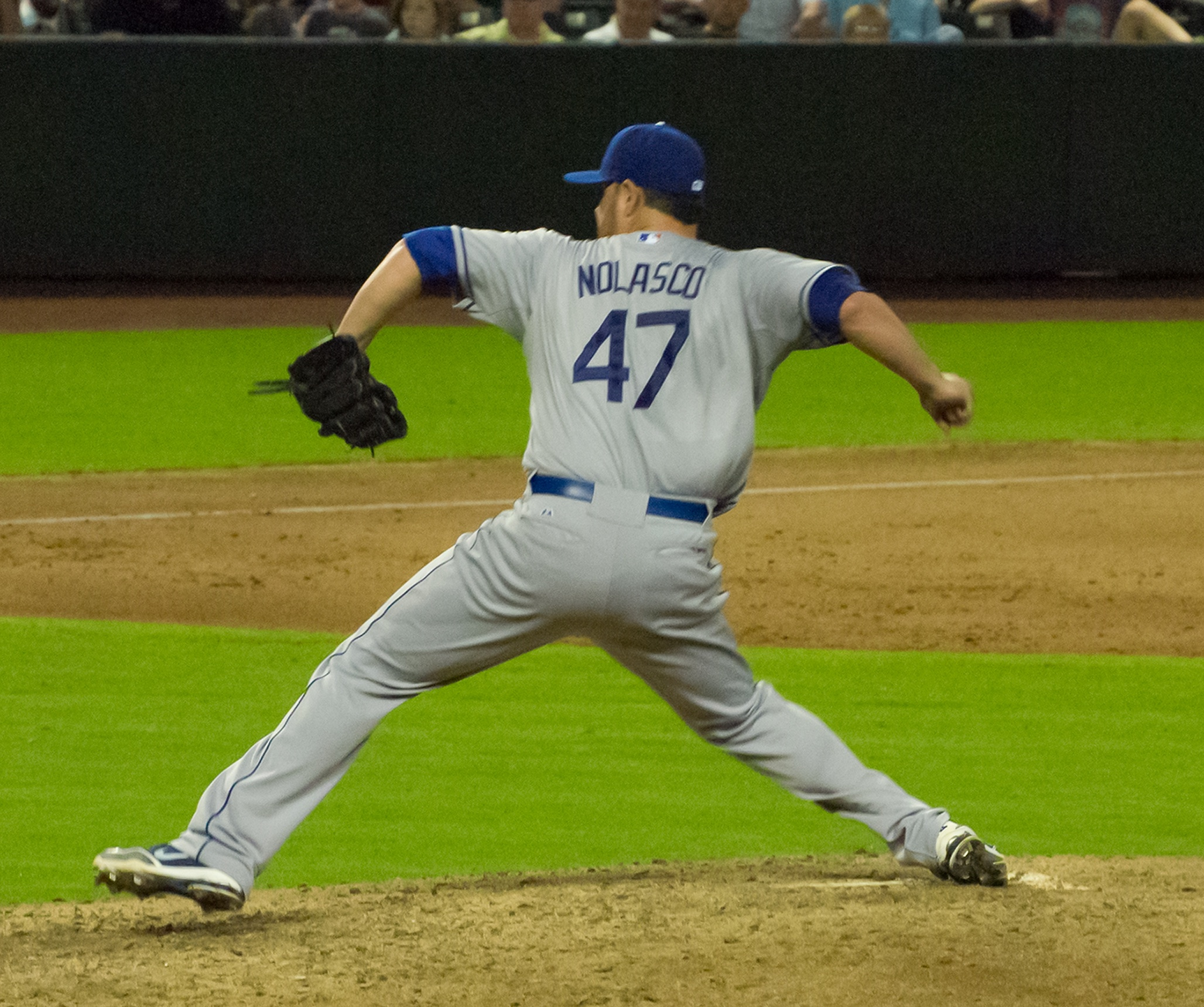
Nolasco pitching for the Los Angeles Dodgers in 2013

On July 6, 2013, he was traded to the Los Angeles Dodgers for Josh Wall and minor-league pitchers Steve Ames and Ángel Sánchez. He made 15 starts for the Dodgers and was 8–3 with a 3.52 ERA. Nolasco is the only Marlins pitcher to have both over 1,000 innings pitched and 1,000 strikeouts. He also finished the season with a 3.70 ERA, which was his first season with an ERA below 4 since his breakout campaign in 2008. On October 15, 2013, Nolasco made his only career postseason appearance in game 4 of the NLCS against the St. Louis Cardinals but was tagged for a loss after allowing 3 runs in 4 innings. He became a free agent following the 2013 season.

=== Minnesota Twins ===
On November 27, 2013, Nolasco agreed to terms with the Minnesota Twins on a four-year, $49 million contract. In his first season with the Twins in 2014, Nolasco posted a disappointing 5.38 ERA with a 6–12 record in 27 starts. Nolasco's 2015 season was cut short due to injury, recording a 6.75 ERA with a 5–2 record in eight starts while also appearing in one game out of the bullpen. For the 2016 season, Nolasco competed for a rotation spot with Tyler Duffey. Duffey ended up being sent down to Triple–A before the season began, which ultimately resulted in Nolasco winning the fifth spot in the Twins starting rotation. Unfortunately, Nolasco's unimpressive tenure with the Twins continued as he posted a 4–8 record with an ERA of 5.13 in 21 starts for the team. Nolasco ended his 2 1/2 seasons with the Twins with a 15–22 record and a 5.44 ERA in 57 games (56 starts).

=== Los Angeles Angels ===
On August 1, 2016, the Twins traded Nolasco with Alex Meyer plus cash in exchange for Angels pitchers Hector Santiago and Alan Busenitz. He had the lowest zone percentage of all major league pitchers, with only 39.1% of his pitches being in the strike zone. Nolasco finished the 2016 season on a high note by winning 3 consecutive starts without allowing a single earned run. In 11 starts for the Angels since the trade, Nolasco was 4–6 with a 3.21 ERA.

For the 2017 season, Nolasco was chosen to be the Angels' Opening Day starting pitcher. Nolasco's 2017 season was his worst season of his career, finishing with a record of 6-15 and posting a 4.92 ERA in 33 starts. Nolasco also walked a career high 58 batters and gave up a career high 35 home runs in 2017. He became a free agent after the Angels declined to pick up his club option for 2018.

=== Kansas City Royals ===
Nolasco signed a minor league contract with the Kansas City Royals on March 7, 2018. He was released by the Royals on March 24.

=== Arizona Diamondbacks ===
On February 8, 2019, Nolasco signed a minor league contract with the Arizona Diamondbacks that included an invitation to spring training. He split the year between the rookie–level Arizona League Diamondbacks, Double–A Jackson Generals, and Triple–A Reno Aces. In 11 games for the three affiliates, Nolasco struggled to a 9.41 ERA with 24 strikeouts across 22 innings pitched. He elected free agency following the season on November 4.

== Pitching style ==
Nolasco throws five pitches: a four-seam fastball, a sinker, a split-finger fastball, a slider, and a knuckle curve .

== Personal life ==
Nolasco goes by the first name "Ricky" because his father named his son after his favorite Dodger, Rick Monday. Nolasco's older brother, Dave, attended Riverside Community College and was selected by the Milwaukee Brewers in the 23rd round of the 2001 MLB draft.

== See also ==
- List of Miami Marlins team records
