= Renyel Pinto =

Venezuelan baseball player (born 1982)

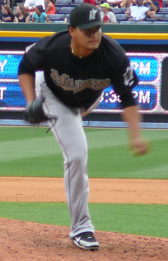
- Pinto with the Florida Marlins in 2007
- Pitcher
- Born: July 8, 1982 (age 43); Cúpira, Venezuela
- Batted: Left Threw: Left

Professional debut
- MLB: May 18, 2006, for the Florida Marlins
- NPB: April 5, 2012, for the Fukuoka SoftBank Hawks

Last appearance
- MLB: June 16, 2010, for the Florida Marlins
- NPB: April 11, 2012, for the Fukuoka SoftBank Hawks

MLB statistics
- Win–loss record: 8–10
- Earned run average: 3.62
- Strikeouts: 222

NPB statistics
- Win–loss record: 1–1
- Earned run average: 7.36
- Strikeouts: 6
- Stats at Baseball Reference

Teams
- Florida Marlins (2006–2010); Fukuoka SoftBank Hawks (2012)

Renyel Eligio Pinto Cumache (born July 8, 1982) is a Venezuelan former professional baseball pitcher. He played in Major League Baseball (MLB) for the Florida Marlins, and in Nippon Professional Baseball (NPB) for the Fukuoka SoftBank Hawks.

== Career ==
=== Chicago Cubs ===
On January 31, 1999, Pinto signed with the Chicago Cubs as an international free agent. In 2004, Pinto was named the Cubs' minor league pitcher of the year, after going 11–8 with a Southern League-leading 2.92 ERA while pitching for the Double-A West Tenn Diamond Jaxx. He earned mid-season and post-season SL All-Star honors and was promoted to the Triple-A Iowa Cubs.

=== Florida Marlins ===
On December 7, 2005, Pinto was traded to the Florida Marlins, along with pitchers Sergio Mitre and Ricky Nolasco, in a trade that sent outfielder Juan Pierre to the Cubs. In four scoreless innings for the Marlins in 2006, Pinto struck out three and allowed two hits before being optioned to the Triple-A Albuquerque Isotopes on May 30. He was called back up to the major leagues when the teams expanded to their 40-man rosters. Pinto made 27 total appearances for Florida during his rookie campaign, recording a 3.03 ERA with 36 strikeouts and one save across 29 2/3 innings pitched.

In 2007, Pinto made his mark in the Marlins' bullpen being used as a very good situational lefty early in the season. He excelled against lefties and was difficult on righties with his improving changeup. In 57 total appearances for the Marlins, Pinto posted a 2-4 record and 3.68 ERA with 56 strikeouts and one save across 58 2/3 innings pitched.

In 2008, Pinto stepped back into his situational lefty role, but he was used many times as a multi-inning reliever and was even considered for a rotation spot during spring training. In 67 games for the Marlins, Pinto registered a 2-5 record and 4.45 ERA with 56 strikeouts over 64 2/3 innings of work.

Pinto made 73 appearances out of the bullpen for Florida during the 2009 campaign, posting a 4-1 record and 3.23 ERA with 58 strikeouts across 61 1/3 innings pitched. Pinto pitched in 20 games for the team in 2010, in which he recorded a 2.70 ERA with 16 strikeouts. Pinto was designated for assignment by the Marlins following the promotion of Tim Wood on June 16, 2010. He was released after clearing waivers on June 23.

=== St. Louis Cardinals ===
On June 26, 2010, Pinto signed a minor league contract with the St. Louis Cardinals. He made 18 appearances for the Triple-A Memphis Redbirds, logging a 4.78 ERA with 31 strikeouts across 26 1/3 innings pitched. Pinto was released by the Cardinals organization on August 27.

=== Fukuoka SoftBank Hawks ===
On January 11, 2012, Pinto signed with the Fukuoka SoftBank Hawks of Nippon Professional Baseball. He made two starts for Fukuoka, struggling to a 7.36 ERA with a 1-1 record and six strikeouts over 7 1/3 innings pitched. Pinto was released by the Hawks on April 11.

=== Diablos Rojos del Mexico ===
On April 18, 2014, Pinto signed with the Diablos Rojos del México of the Mexican League. In three starts for México, he posted a 1-0 record and 6.94 ERA with 12 strikeouts across 11 2/3 innings pitched. Pinto was released by the Diablos on May 3.

=== Piratas de Campeche ===
On April 20, 2022, Pinto signed with the Piratas de Campeche of the Mexican League, after nearly 8 years out of professional baseball. He made 5 appearances out of the bullpen and recorded a 7.94 ERA with 5 strikeouts over 5 2/3 innings pitched. Pinto was released by the Piratas on May 9.

== See also ==
- List of Major League Baseball players from Venezuela
