= Graham Taylor (baseball) =

American baseball player (born 1984)

- Starting pitcher
- Born: May 25, 1984 (age 42); Covington, Kentucky, U.S.
- Batted: Left Threw: Left

MLB debut
- April 26, 2009, for the Florida Marlins

Last MLB appearance
- May 6, 2009, for the Florida Marlins

MLB statistics
- Win–loss record: 0-2
- Earned run average: 8.18
- Strikeouts: 5
- Stats at Baseball Reference

Teams
- Florida Marlins (2009)

Graham Michael Taylor (born May 25, 1984) is an American former professional baseball pitcher who played for the Florida Marlins of Major League Baseball during the 2009 season.

== Amateur career ==
Taylor attended Miami University of Ohio, and in 2003 and 2004 he played collegiate summer baseball with the Hyannis Mets of the Cape Cod Baseball League. He was selected by the Florida Marlins in the 10th round of the 2006 MLB draft. He was signed by scout Matt Anderson.

== Professional career ==
He made his minor league debut in 2006, with the Jamestown Jammers. From 2006 to 2008, Taylor had a 28–16 record with a 3.07 ERA in the Minors. In 2007 while pitching for the Greensboro Grasshoppers, Taylor was named Marlins Organizational Pitcher of the Year. He was also named Marlins Pitcher of the Month on 3 occasions, as well as being Named Pitcher of the Week often in the minors.

Taylor made his Major League debut on April 26, 2009, against the Philadelphia Phillies. He pitched 3.2 innings and gave up 4 earned runs on 4 hits, 6 walks, 1 hit batsman. He also struck out 2 batters. The Marlins lost 13–2. Taylor was credited with the loss.
