= 2009 Colorado Rockies season =

2009 Colorado Rockies
- National League Wild Card winners
- League: National League
- Division: West
- Ballpark: Coors Field
- City: Denver, Colorado
- Record: 92–70 (.568)
- Divisional place: 2nd
- Owners: Charles & Richard Monfort
- General manager: Dan O'Dowd
- Managers: Clint Hurdle, Jim Tracy
- Television: FSN Rocky Mountain Drew Goodman; George Frazier; Jeff Huson
- Radio: KOA (English); Jeff Kingery; Jack Corrigan; KMXA (Spanish)
- Stats: ESPN.com; Baseball Reference

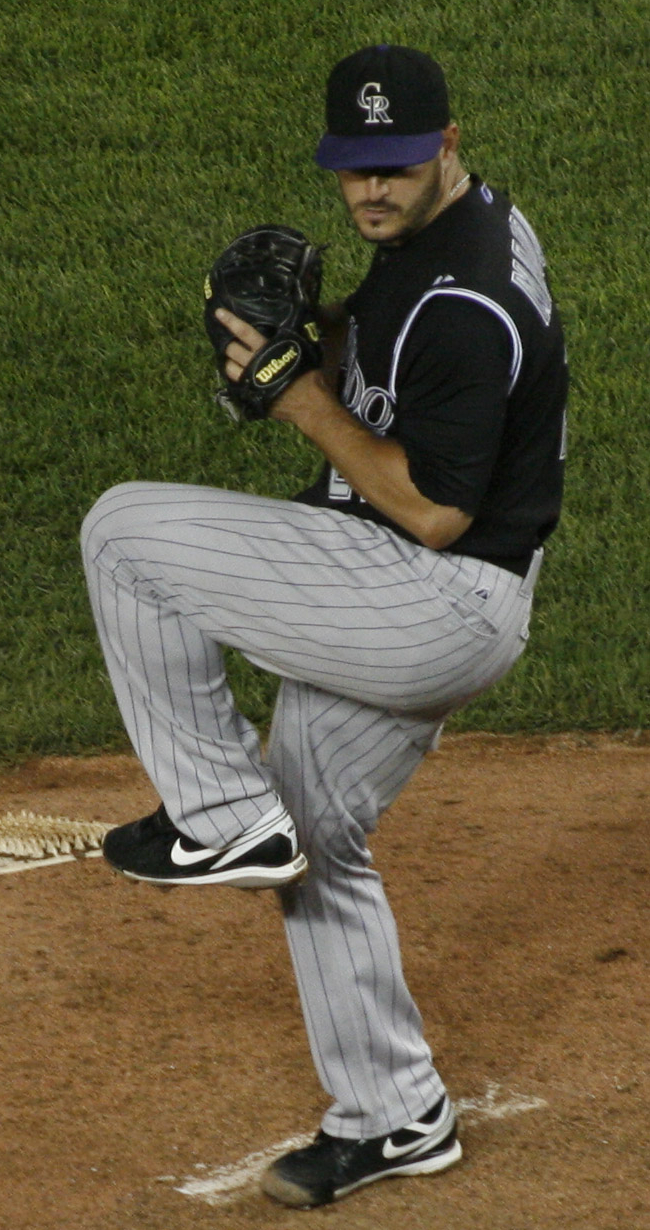
Jason Marquis pitching for the Colorado Rockies in a game on August 19, 2009.

The 2009 Colorado Rockies entered the season attempting to improve on their 74–88 record from 2008. They lost 28 of their first 46 games, but following the hiring of interim manager Jim Tracy, the Rockies came back to win their third Wild Card title, and second in three years. The Rockies had a chance to win the division on the final series of the season needing to win all three games against the Dodgers to do so, but lost the last two after winning the first game to lose out on the division title. The team drew 2,665,080 fans for the season, their highest total since 2002. The average home attendance was 32,902 fans. Their 92 regular season wins is currently the most in a single season in Rockies franchise history and their 715 runs allowed is the fewest runs they have allowed in a full season.

== Offseason ==
- November 10, 2008: Matt Holliday was traded by the Colorado Rockies to the Oakland Athletics for Carlos González, Huston Street, and Greg Smith.
- January 6, 2009: Luis Vizcaíno was traded by the Colorado Rockies to the Chicago Cubs for Jason Marquis.
- February 1, 2009: Matt Belisle was signed as a free agent by the Colorado Rockies.
- April 5, 2009: Jason Hammel was traded by the Tampa Bay Rays to the Colorado Rockies for Aneury Rodríguez.

== Regular season ==
=== Season standings ===
NL West
Team	W	L	Pct.	GB	Home	Road
Los Angeles Dodgers	95	67	.586	—	50‍–‍31	45‍–‍36
Colorado Rockies	92	70	.568	3	51‍–‍30	41‍–‍40
San Francisco Giants	88	74	.543	7	52‍–‍29	36‍–‍45
San Diego Padres	75	87	.463	20	42‍–‍39	33‍–‍48
Arizona Diamondbacks	70	92	.432	25	36‍–‍45	34‍–‍47

=== Wild Card standings ===
NL Wild Card	W	L	Pct.	GB
Colorado Rockies	92	70	.568	—
San Francisco Giants	88	74	.543	4
Florida Marlins	87	75	.537	5
Atlanta Braves	86	76	.531	6
Chicago Cubs	83	78	.516	8½
Milwaukee Brewers	80	82	.494	12
Cincinnati Reds	78	84	.481	14

=== Record vs. opponents ===
2009 National League record Source: MLB Standings Grid – 2009
Team	AZ	ATL	CHC	CIN	COL	FLA	HOU	LAD	MIL	NYM	PHI	PIT	SD	SF	STL	WAS	AL
Arizona	–	3–4	4–2	1–5	7–11	5–3	5–4	7–11	2–5	5–2	1–5	6–1	11–7	5–13	2–4	1–5	5–10
Atlanta	4–3	–	4–2	3–6	4–4	8–10	3–3	4–3	3–3	13–5	10–8	3–4	3–3	3–4	4–2	10–8	7–8
Chicago	2–4	2–4	–	10–5	2–4	4–3	11–6	3–5	10–7	3–3	1–5	10–4	4–5	4–2	6–10	5–2	6–9
Cincinnati	5–1	6–3	5–10	–	0–7	3–3	12–4	1–5	8–7	2–4	2–5	13–5	1–6	3–3	8–8	3–4	6–9
Colorado	11–7	4–4	4–2	7–0	–	2–4	2–5	4–14	6–0	3–4	2–4	6–3	10–8	8–10	6–1	6–0	11–4
Florida	3–5	10–8	3–4	3–3	4–2	–	4–3	3–3	3–4	11–7	9–9	2–4	4–2	3–4	3–3	12–6	10–8
Houston	4–5	3–3	6–11	4–12	5–2	3–4	–	4–3	5–10	1–5	6–2	10–5	6–1	2–4	6–9	3–3	6–9
Los Angeles	11–7	3–4	5–3	5–1	14–4	3–3	3–4	–	3–3	5–1	4–3	4–3	10–8	11–7	2–5	3–2	9–9
Milwaukee	5–2	3–3	7–10	7–8	0–6	4–3	10–5	3–3	–	3–3	4–3	9–5	2–4	4–5	9–9	5–3	5–10
New York	2–5	5–13	3–3	4–2	4–3	7–11	5–1	1–5	3–3	–	6–12	4–3	2–5	5–3	4–5	10–8	5–10
Philadelphia	5–1	8–10	5–1	5–2	4–2	9–9	2–6	3–4	3–4	12–6	–	4–2	5–2	3–4	4–1	15–3	6–12
Pittsburgh	1–6	4–3	4–10	5–13	3–6	4–2	5–10	3–4	5–9	3–4	2–4	–	3–4	2–4	5–10	5–3	8–7
San Diego	7–11	3–3	5–4	6–1	8–10	2–4	1–6	8–10	4–2	5–2	2–5	4–3	–	10–8	1–6	4–2	5–10
San Francisco	13–5	4–3	2–4	3–3	10–8	4–3	4–2	7–11	5–4	3–5	4–3	4–2	8–10	–	4–3	4–2	9–6
St. Louis	4–2	2–4	10–6	8–8	1–6	3–3	9–6	5–2	9–9	5–4	1–4	10–5	6–1	3–4	–	6–1	9–6
Washington	5–1	8–10	2–5	4–3	0–6	6–12	3–3	2–3	3–5	8–10	3–15	3–5	2–4	2–4	1–6	–	7–11

=== Transactions ===
- July 23, 2009: Rafael Betancourt was traded by the Cleveland Indians to the Colorado Rockies for Connor Graham (minors).
- July 31, 2009: Joe Beimel was traded by the Washington Nationals to the Colorado Rockies for Ryan Mattheus and Robinson Fabian (minors).
- August 24, 2009: Jason Giambi was signed as a free agent by the Colorado Rockies.
- August 31, 2009: José Contreras was traded by the Chicago White Sox to the Colorado Rockies for Brandon Hynick (minors).

=== Major League debuts ===
- Batters:
  - Eric Young, Jr. (Aug 25)
  - Mike McCoy (Sep 9)
- Pitchers:
  - Matt Daley (Apr 25)
  - Jhoulys Chacín (Jul 25)
  - Esmil Rogers (Sep 12)

=== Roster ===
2009 Colorado Rockies
Roster
Pitchers: 97 Joe Beimel; 34 Matt Belisle; 63 Rafael Betancourt; 45 Jhoulys Chacín; 54 José Contreras; 28 Aaron Cook; 60 Manuel Corpas; 31 Matt Daley; 29 Jorge de la Rosa; 49 Adam Eaton; 41 Alan Embree; 53 Randy Flores; 51 Josh Fogg; 49 Jason Grilli; 46 Jason Hammel; 77 Matt Herges; 38 Ubaldo Jiménez; 21 Jason Marquis; 56 Franklin Morales; 52 Joel Peralta; 58 Juan Rincón; 48 Esmil Rogers; 32 Glendon Rusch; 37 Ryan Speier; 16 Huston Street	Catchers: 15 Edwin Bellorín; 20 Chris Iannetta; 39 Paul Phillips; 8 Yorvit Torrealba; Infielders: 27 Garrett Atkins; 10 Jeff Baker; 12 Clint Barmes; 23 Jason Giambi; 17 Todd Helton; 18 Mike McCoy; 6 Omar Quintanilla; 9 Ian Stewart; 2 Troy Tulowitzki; 3 Eric Young, Jr.; Outfielders: 24 Dexter Fowler; 5 Carlos González; 11 Brad Hawpe; 14 Matt Murton; 7 Seth Smith; 19 Ryan Spilborghs	Manager: 13 Clint Hurdle; 4 Jim Tracy; Coaches: 36 Bob Apodaca (pitching); 25 Don Baylor (hitting); 43 Rich Dauer (third base); 30 Glenallen Hill (first base); 22 Tom Runnells (bench); 59 Mark Strittmatter (bullpen catcher); 4 Jim Tracy (bench); 55 Jim Wright (bullpen)

=== Game log ===
2009 Game Log
April (8–12)

#	Date	Opponent	Score	Win	Loss	Save	Attendance	Record
1	April 6	@ Diamondbacks	9–8	Peña (1–0)	Grilli (0–1)	Qualls (1)	48,799	0–1
2	April 7	@ Diamondbacks	3–0	Jiménez (1–0)	Haren (0–1)	Street (1)	26,637	1–1
3	April 8	@ Diamondbacks	9–2	Morales (1–0)	Davis (0–1)		18,227	2–1
4	April 10	Phillies	10–3	Marquis (1–0)	Hamels (0–1)		49,427	3–1
5	April 11	Phillies	8–4	Myers (1–1)	de la Rosa (0–1)		35,251	3–2
6	April 12	Phillies	7–5	Madson (1–0)	Street (0–1)	Lidge (2)	21,628	3–3
7	April 13	@ Cubs	4–0	Lilly (2–0)	Jiménez (1–1)		40,077	3–4
8	April 15	@ Cubs	5–2	Marquis (2–0)	Harden (0–1)	Grilli (1)	39,361	4–4
9	April 17	@ Dodgers	4–3	Mota (1–0)	Embree (0–1)	Broxton (4)	45,145	4–5
10	April 18	@ Dodgers	9–5	Billingsley (3–0)	Cook (0–1)		36,765	4–6
11	April 19	@ Dodgers	14–2	Elbert (1–0)	Jiménez (1–2)		41,474	4–7
12	April 20	@ Diamondbacks	6–3	Garland (2–1)	Marquis (2–1)	Qualls (3)	25,788	4–8
13	April 21	@ Diamondbacks	9–6	Belisle (1–0)	Gutiérrez (0–1)	Corpas (1)	25,411	5–8
14	April 22	@ Diamondbacks	2–0	Haren (1–3)	de la Rosa (0–2)	Qualls (4)	19,147	5–9
15	April 24	Dodgers	6–5	Kuo (1–0)	Corpas (0–1)	Broxton (6)	36,151	5–10
16	April 25	Dodgers	6–5	McDonald (1–1)	Jiménez (1–3)	Troncoso (1)	31,476	5–11
17	April 26	Dodgers	10–4	Marquis (3–1)	Kershaw (0–2)		35,505	6–11
18	April 27	Padres	12–7	Grilli (1–1)	Young (2–1)		18,246	7–11
19	April 28	Padres	4–3	Sánchez (1–0)	Corpas (0–2)	Bell (8)	19,346	7–12
20	April 29	Padres	7–5	Cook (1–1)	Correia (0–2)	Street (2)	20,289	8–12

May (12–17)

#	Date	Opponent	Score	Win	Loss	Save	Attendance	Record
21	May 1	@ Giants	3–2	Johnson (2–2)	Jiménez (1–4)	Wilson (6)	30,791	8–13
22	May 2	@ Giants	5–1	Marquis (4–1)	Cain (2–1)		30,166	9–13
23	May 3	@ Giants	1–0 (10)	Medders (1–1)	Corpas (0–3)		30,650	9–14
24	May 4	@ Padres	9–6	Rusch (1–0)	Moreno (1–3)	Street (3)	14,717	10–14
25	May 5	@ Padres	2–1 (10)	Bell (1–0)	Daley (0–1)		13,646	10–15
26	May 6	Giants	11–1	Jiménez (2–4)	Johnson (2–3)		22,105	11–15
27	May 7	Giants	8–3	Cain (3–1)	Marquis (4–2)		23,453	11–16
28	May 8	Marlins	8–3	Nolasco (2–3)	Hammel (0–1)		27,398	11–17
29	May 9	Marlins	3–1	Johnson (3–0)	de la Rosa (0–3)	Lindstrom (6)	28,227	11–18
30	May 10	Marlins	3–2	Cook (2–1)	Volstad (2–2)	Street (4)	30,197	12–18
31	May 12	Astros	12–1	Jiménez (3–4)	Paulino (0–3)		23,233	13–18
32	May 13	Astros	15–11	Hampton (2–3)	Marquis (4–3)		19,226	13–19
33	May 14	Astros	5–3	Rodríguez (4–2)	Hammel (0–2)	Hawkins (5)	22,696	13–20
34	May 15	@ Pirates	3–1	Embree (1–1)	Capps (0–3)	Street (5)	17,179	14–20
35	May 16	@ Pirates	7–4	Burnett (1–1)	Belisle (1–1)	Capps (7)	24,496	14–21
36	May 17	@ Pirates	11–4	Duke (5–3)	Embree (1–2)		14,545	14–22
37	May 18	@ Braves	5–1	Marquis (5–3)	Lowe (5–2)		15,364	15–22
38	May 19	@ Braves	8–1	Jurrjens (4–2)	Hammel (0–3)		16,749	15–23
39	May 20	@ Braves	12–4	Vázquez (4–3)	de la Rosa (0–4)		19,259	15–24
40	May 21	@ Braves	9–0	Cook (3–1)	Medlen (0–1)		25,481	16–24
41	May 22	@ Tigers	4–3	Porcello (5–3)	Jiménez (3–5)	Zumaya (1)	28,264	16–25
42	May 23	@ Tigers	4–3	Marquis (6–3)	Galarraga (3–4)	Street (6)	37,035	17–25
43	May 24	@ Tigers	3–1	Hammel (1–3)	Willis (1–1)	Street (7)	34,606	18–25
44	May 25	Dodgers	16–6	Ohman (1–0)	de la Rosa (0–5)		37,024	18–26
45	May 26	Dodgers	7–1	Milton (1–0)	Cook (3–2)		25,384	18–27
46	May 27	Dodgers	8–6	Kershaw (3–3)	Jiménez (3–6)		22,271	18–28
47	May 29	Padres	3–0	Marquis (7–3)	Young (4–3)	Street (8)	23,239	19–28
48	May 30	Padres	8–7	Street (1–1)	Bell (2–1)		32,064	20–28
49	May 31	Padres	5–2	Gaudin (2–3)	de la Rosa (0–6)	Bell (15)	30,223	20–29

June (21–7)

#	Date	Opponent	Score	Win	Loss	Save	Attendance	Record
50	June 1	@ Astros	4–1	Oswalt (2–2)	Cook (3–3)	Hawkins (7)	24,016	20–30
51	June 2	@ Astros	3–2 (11)	Ortiz (3–2)	Fogg (0–1)		24,041	20–31
52	June 3	@ Astros	6–4	Byrdak (2–1)	Marquis (7–4)	Sampson (3)	22,032	20–32
53	June 4	@ Astros	10–3	Hammel (2–3)	Rodríguez (5–5)		26,671	21–32
54	June 5	@ Cardinals	11–4	de la Rosa (1–6)	Wainwright (5–4)		41,115	22–32
55	June 6	@ Cardinals	10–1	Cook (4–3)	Wellemeyer (5–6)		44,002	23–32
56	June 7	@ Cardinals	7–2	Jiménez (4–6)	Piñeiro (5–6)		42,288	24–32
57	June 8	@ Cardinals	5–2	Marquis (8–4)	Thompson (0–2)	Street (9)	36,748	25–32
58	June 9	@ Brewers	3–2	Hammel (3–3)	Coffey (1–1)	Street (10)	32,464	26–32
59	June 10	@ Brewers	4–2	de la Rosa (2–6)	Bush (3–3)	Street (11)	34,823	27–32
60	June 11	@ Brewers	5–4	Cook (5–3)	Gallardo (6–3)	Street (12)	35,467	28–32
61	June 12	Mariners	6–4	Jiménez (5–6)	Washburn (3–5)		30,365	29–32
62	June 13	Mariners	5–3	Corpas (1–3)	Lowe (0–4)	Street (13)	31,101	30–32
63	June 14	Mariners	7–1	Hammel (4–3)	Vargas (2–2)		38,614	31–32
64	June 16	Rays	12–4	Niemann (6–4)	de la Rosa (2–7)		28,582	31–33
65	June 17	Rays	5–3	Cook (6–3)	Price (1–1)	Street (14)	26,460	32–33
66	June 18	Rays	4–3	Jiménez (6–6)	Garza (4–5)	Street (15)	28,639	33–33
67	June 19	Pirates	7–3	Marquis (9–4)	Ohlendorf (6–6)		31,248	34–33
68	June 20	Pirates	9–7	Street (2–1)	Chavez (0–3)		32,137	35–33
69	June 21	Pirates	5–4	de la Rosa (3–7)	Maholm (4–4)	Street (16)	44,131	36–33
70	June 22	@ Angels	11–1	Cook (7–3)	Palmer (6–1)		39,557	37–33
71	June 23	@ Angels	4–3	Jepsen (2–2)	Jiménez (6–7)	Fuentes (20)	42,233	37–34
72	June 24	@ Angels	11–3	Saunders (8–4)	Marquis (9–5)		43,551	37–35
73	June 26	@ Athletics	4–2	Hammel (5–3)	Braden (5–7)	Street (17)	20,872	38–35
74	June 27	@ Athletics	11–9	de la Rosa (4–7)	Cahill (5–6)	Street (18)	18,624	39–35
75	June 28	@ Athletics	3–1	Cook (8–3)	Mazzaro (2–3)	Street (19)	15,701	40–35
76	June 29	@ Dodgers	4–2 (13)	McDonald (2–1)	Peralta (0–1)		41,288	40–36
77	June 30	@ Dodgers	3–0	Marquis (10–5)	Billingsley (9–4)		43,437	41–36

July (15–11)

#	Date	Opponent	Score	Win	Loss	Save	Attendance	Record
78	July 1	@ Dodgers	1–0	Troncoso (2–0)	Hammel (5–4)	Broxton (19)	40,455	41–37
79	July 3	Diamondbacks	5–0	de la Rosa (5–7)	Scherzer (5–6)		49,026	42–37
80	July 4	Diamondbacks	11–7	Schoeneweis (1–0)	Peralta (0–2)	Qualls (14)	49,096	42–38
81	July 5	Diamondbacks	4–3	Haren (8–5)	Jiménez (6–8)	Qualls (15)	27,547	42–39
82	July 6	Nationals	1–0	Marquis (11–5)	Stammen (1–4)	Street (20)	25,205	43–39
83	July 7	Nationals	5–4	Embree (2–2)	Tavárez (3–7)	Street (21)	25,314	44–39
84	July 8	Nationals	10–4	de la Rosa (6–7)	Detwiler (0–5)		23,098	45–39
85	July 9	Braves	7–6	Rincón (2–0)	González (3–2)	Street (22)	30,392	46–39
86	July 10	Braves	4–1	Lowe (8–7)	Jiménez (6–9)	Soriano (11)	35,238	46–40
87	July 11	Braves	4–3	Jurrjens (7–7)	Marquis (11–6)	Soriano (12)	38,065	46–41
88	July 12	Braves	8–7	Street (3–1)	Valdez (0–1)		33,825	47–41
89	July 16	@ Padres	10–1	Cook (9–3)	Gaudin (4–8)		22,758	48–41
90	July 17	@ Padres	5–3	Jiménez (7–9)	Geer (1–5)	Street (23)	21,887	49–41
91	July 18	@ Padres	3–1	Burke (2–1)	Peralta (0–3)	Bell (24)	28,652	49–42
92	July 19	@ Padres	6–1	Marquis (12–6)	Latos (0–1)		20,747	50–42
93	July 20	Diamondbacks	10–6	de la Rosa (7–7)	Davis (4–10)		40,444	51–42
94	July 21	Diamondbacks	6–5	Gutiérrez (2–2)	Rincón (2–1)	Qualls (18)	30,248	51–43
95	July 22	Diamondbacks	4–3	Rincón (3–1)	Schoeneweis (1–2)	Street (24)	30,451	52–43
96	July 24	Giants	3–1	Cain (12–2)	Hammel (5–5)	Wilson (25)	40,524	52–44
97	July 25	Giants	8–2	de la Rosa (8–7)	Sánchez (3–9)		42,201	53–44
98	July 26	Giants	4–2	Cook (10–3)	Sadowski (2–3)	Street (25)	40,723	54–44
99	July 27	@ Mets	7–3	Feliciano (3–3)	Rincón (3–2)		38,936	54–45
100	July 28	@ Mets	4–0	Pelfrey (8–6)	Marquis (12–7)		39,126	54–46
–	July 29	@ Mets	Postponed (rain) Rescheduled for July 30					
101	July 30	@ Mets	7–0	Santana (12–8)	Hammel (5–6)		40,024	54–47
102	July 30	@ Mets	4–2	de la Rosa (9–7)	Niese (1–1)	Street (26)	38,962	55–47
103	July 31	@ Reds	5–3	Morales (2–0)	Weathers (2–3)	Street (27)	22,130	56–47

August (16–12)

#	Date	Opponent	Score	Win	Loss	Save	Attendance	Record
104	August 1	@ Reds	6–2	Jiménez (8–9)	Bailey (2–3)		23,452	57–47
105	August 2	@ Reds	6–4 (11)	Morales (3–0)	Masset (4–1)	Street (28)	31,142	58–47
106	August 4	@ Phillies	8–3	Hammel (6–6)	Moyer (10–8)		45,203	59–47
107	August 5	@ Phillies	7–0	Happ (8–2)	de la Rosa (9–8)		45,129	59–48
108	August 6	@ Phillies	3–1	Lee (9–9)	Cook (10–4)	Lidge (21)	45,316	59–49
109	August 7	Cubs	6–2	Jiménez (9–9)	Marshall (3–7)		46,118	60–49
110	August 8	Cubs	6–5	Dempster (6–5)	Marquis (12–8)	Gregg (22)	47,845	60–50
111	August 9	Cubs	11–5	Hammel (7–6)	Wells (8–5)		40,217	61–50
112	August 10	Cubs	11–5	de la Rosa (10–8)	Gorzelanny (4–2)		34,485	62–50
113	August 11	Pirates	7–3	Ohlendorf (10–8)	Chacín (0–1)		35,212	62–51
114	August 12	Pirates	8–0	Jiménez (10–9)	Hart (3–2)		29,430	63–51
115	August 13	Pirates	10–1	Marquis (13–8)	Maholm (6–7)		27,619	64–51
116	August 14	@ Marlins	6–5	Johnson (12–2)	Hammel (7–7)	Núñez (13)	15,965	64–52
–	August 15	@ Marlins	Postponed (rain) Rescheduled for August 16					
117	August 16	@ Marlins	10–3	Volstad (9–9)	Cook (10–5)		18,471	64–53
118	August 16	@ Marlins	7–3	de la Rosa (11–8)	VandenHurk (2–2)	Street (29)	20,089	65–53
119	August 18	@ Nationals	4–3	Jiménez (11–9)	Burnett (2–3)	Street (30)	18,192	66–53
120	August 19	@ Nationals	5–4	Marquis (14–8)	Balester (1–3)	Street (31)	16,187	67–53
121	August 20	@ Nationals	4–1	Hammel (8–7)	Mock (2–5)	Street (32)	18,036	68–53
122	August 21	Giants	6–3	Sánchez (6–10)	Cook (10–6)		43,666	68–54
123	August 22	Giants	14–11	de la Rosa (12–8)	Miller (2–2)		47,178	69–54
124	August 23	Giants	4–2	Jiménez (12–9)	Lincecum (12–4)	Street (33)	48,704	70–54
125	August 24	Giants	6–4 (14)	Eaton (3–5)	Miller (2–3)		27,670	71–54
126	August 25	Dodgers	5–4 (10)	Herges (3–1)	McDonald (3–3)		31,472	72–54
127	August 26	Dodgers	6–1	Wolf (9–6)	Fogg (0–2)		38,350	72–55
128	August 27	Dodgers	3–2	Padilla (9–6)	de la Rosa (12–9)	Broxton (28)	33,441	72–56
129	August 28	@ Giants	2–0	Lincecum (13–4)	Jiménez (12–10)	Wilson (31)	39,047	72–57
130	August 29	@ Giants	5–3	Zito (9–11)	Marquis (14–9)	Wilson (32)	41,200	72–58
131	August 30	@ Giants	9–5	Medders (3–1)	Betancourt (1–3)		42,571	72–59

September (18–9)

#	Date	Opponent	Score	Win	Loss	Save	Attendance	Record
132	September 1	Mets	8–3	de la Rosa (13–9)	Pelfrey (9–10)		26,190	73–59
133	September 2	Mets	5–2	Jiménez (13–10)	Stokes (1–4)	Morales (1)	26,276	74–59
134	September 3	Mets	8–3	Misch (1–1)	Marquis (14–10)		22,566	74–60
135	September 4	Diamondbacks	5–4	Betancourt (2–3)	Boyer (0–2)	Morales (2)	31,401	75–60
136	September 5	Diamondbacks	4–1	Contreras (6–13)	Davis (7–12)	Morales (3)	39,297	76–60
137	September 6	Diamondbacks	13–5	de la Rosa (14–9)	Petit (3–9)		35,192	77–60
138	September 7	Reds	4–3	Betancourt (3–3)	Fisher (1–1)	Morales (4)	40,357	78–60
139	September 8	Reds	3–1	Marquis (15–10)	Maloney (0–4)	Morales (5)	23,154	79–60
140	September 9	Reds	4–3	Daley (1–1)	Cordero (2–5)		23,721	80–60
141	September 10	Reds	5–1	Rincón (4–2)	Wells (1–4)		24,175	81–60
142	September 11	@ Padres	4–1	Betancourt (4–3)	Bell (5–3)	Morales (6)	18,022	82–60
143	September 12	@ Padres	3–2 (10)	Gallagher (2–2)	Morales (3–1)		19,897	82–61
144	September 13	@ Padres	7–3	Russell (2–0)	Marquis (15–11)		19,739	82–62
145	September 14	@ Giants	9–1	Lincecum (14–5)	Hammel (8–8)		31,307	82–63
146	September 15	@ Giants	10–2	Zito (10–12)	Jiménez (13–11)		30,353	82–64
147	September 16	@ Giants	4–3	de la Rosa (15–9)	Cain (13–6)	Betancourt (2)	38,696	83–64
148	September 18	@ Diamondbacks	7–5	Rosales (2–1)	Flores (0–1)	Gutiérrez (6)	34,231	83–65
149	September 19	@ Diamondbacks	10–4	Hammel (9–8)	Scherzer (9–10)		29,466	84–65
150	September 20	@ Diamondbacks	5–1	Jiménez (14–11)	Haren (14–9)		29,397	85–65
151	September 22	Padres	11–10	Belisle (2–1)	Ramos (0–1)	Morales (7)	30,695	86–65
152	September 23	Padres	6–3	Webb (1–0)	Marquis (15–12)	Bell (40)	29,597	86–66
153	September 24	Padres	5–4	Russell (3–1)	Beimel (1–6)	Gregerson (1)	37,049	86–67
154	September 25	Cardinals	2–1	Street (4–1)	Miller (4–1)		48,847	87–67
155	September 26	Cardinals	6–3	Wainwright (19–8)	Jiménez (14–12)	Franklin (38)	47,741	87–68
156	September 27	Cardinals	4–3	de la Rosa (16–9)	Lohse (6–9)	Street (34)	42,032	88–68
157	September 29	Brewers	7–5 (11)	Belisle (3–1)	Weathers (4–6)		39,087	89–68
158	September 30	Brewers	10–6	Hammel (10–8)	Suppan (7–12)		41,465	90–68

October (2–2)

#	Date	Opponent	Score	Win	Loss	Save	Attendance	Record
159	October 1	Brewers	9–2	Cook (11–6)	Parra (11–11)		38,098	91–68
160	October 2	@ Dodgers	4–3	Jiménez (15–12)	Wolf (11–7)	Street (35)	54,131	92–68
161	October 3	@ Dodgers	5–0	Kuo (2–0)	Morales (3–2)		54,531	92–69
162	October 4	@ Dodgers	5–3	Padilla (12–6)	Marquis (15–13)	Troncoso (6)	51,396	92–70

== Postseason ==
2009 Post-Season
National League Division Series

Game	Date	Opponent	Score	Win	Loss	Save	Attendance	Record
1	October 7	@ Phillies	5–1	Lee (1–0)	Jiménez (0–1)		46,452	0–1
2	October 8	@ Phillies	5–4	Cook (1–0)	Hamels (0–1)	Street (1)	46,528	1–1
–	October 10	Phillies	Postponed (snow/cold) Rescheduled for October 11					
3	October 11	Phillies	6–5	Durbin (1–0)	Street (0–1)	Lidge (1)	50,109	1–2
4	October 12	Phillies	5–4	Madson (1–0)	Street (0–2)	Lidge (2)	49,940	1–3

== Player stats ==
= Indicates team leader

=== Batting ===
==== Starters by position ====
Note: Pos = Position; G = Games played; AB = At bats; H = Hits; Avg. = Batting average; HR = Home runs; RBI = Runs batted in

Pos	Player	G	AB	H	Avg.	HR	RBI
C	Chris Iannetta	93	289	66	.228	16	52
1B	Todd Helton	151	544	177	.325	15	86
2B	Clint Barmes	154	550	135	.245	23	76
SS	Troy Tulowitzki	151	543	161	.297	32	92
3B	Ian Stewart	147	425	97	.228	25	70
LF	Seth Smith	133	335	98	.293	15	55
CF	Dexter Fowler	135	433	115	.266	4	34
RF	Brad Hawpe	145	501	143	.285	23	86

==== Other batters ====
Note: G = Games played; AB = At bats; H = Hits; Avg. = Batting average; HR = Home runs; RBI = Runs batted in

Player	G	AB	H	Avg.	HR	RBI
Garrett Atkins	126	354	80	.226	9	48
Ryan Spilborghs	133	352	85	.241	8	48
Carlos González	89	278	79	.284	13	29
Yorvit Torrealba	64	213	62	.291	2	31
Omar Quintanilla	58	58	10	.172	0	2
Eric Young Jr.	30	57	14	.246	1	1
Matt Murton	29	52	13	.250	1	6
Paul Phillips	17	45	14	.311	1	9
Jason Giambi	19	24	7	.292	2	11
Jeff Baker	12	23	3	.130	0	3
Edwin Bellorin	2	8	2	.250	0	0
Mike McCoy	12	5	0	.000	0	0

=== Pitching ===
==== Starting pitchers ====
Note: G = Games pitched; IP = Innings pitched; W = Wins; L = Losses; ERA = Earned run average; SO = Strikeouts

Player	G	IP	W	L	ERA	SO
Ubaldo Jiménez	33	218.0	15	12	3.47	198
Jason Marquis	33	216.0	15	13	4.04	115
Jorge De La Rosa	33	185.0	16	9	4.38	193
Jason Hammel	34	176.2	10	8	4.33	133
Aaron Cook	27	158.0	11	6	4.16	78
Esmil Rogers	1	4.0	0	0	4.50	3

==== Other pitchers ====
Note: G = Games pitched; IP = Innings pitched; W = Wins; L = Losses; ERA = Earned run average; SO = Strikeouts

Player	G	IP	W	L	ERA	SO
José Contreras	7	17.0	1	0	1.59	17
Jhoulys Chacín	9	11.0	0	1	4.91	13

==== Relief pitchers ====
Note: G = Games pitched; W = Wins; L = Losses; SV = Saves; ERA = Earned run average; SO = Strikeouts

Player	G	W	L	SV	ERA	SO
Huston Street	64	4	1	35	3.06	70
Matt Daley	57	1	1	0	4.24	55
Franklin Morales	40	3	2	7	4.50	41
Alan Embree	36	2	2	0	5.84	12
Manuel Corpas	35	1	3	1	5.88	24
Rafael Betancourt	32	3	1	1	1.78	29
Joel Peralta	27	0	3	0	6.20	22
Randy Flores	27	0	1	0	5.25	14
Juan Rincón	26	3	2	0	7.52	25
Joe Beimel	26	0	1	0	4.02	11
Josh Fogg	24	0	2	0	3.74	27
Matt Belisle	24	3	1	0	5.52	22
Jason Grilli	22	0	1	1	6.05	22
Glendon Rusch	11	2	0	0	6.75	13
Matt Herges	9	1	0	0	2.89	8
Ryan Speier	5	0	0	0	4.76	2
Adam Eaton	4	1	0	0	5.63	7

== Notes ==
- Manager Clint Hurdle was fired and replaced by bench coach Jim Tracy taking the team from the NL West cellar to Wild Card contention winning 20 of the next 25 games
- In June tied the team record 11-game winning streak set in 2007
- First ever team walk-off grand slam by Ryan Spilborghs to beat the Giants 6–4 in the 14th inning.
- Only team in the 2009 season to have five starting pitchers with 10 or more wins (Jason Marquis, Aaron Cook, Ubaldo Jiménez, Jorge de la Rosa, Jason Hammel).

== Farm system ==
Level	Team	League	Manager
AAA	Colorado Springs Sky Sox	Pacific Coast League	Tom Runnells and Stu Cole
AA	Tulsa Drillers	Texas League	Stu Cole and Ron Gideon
A	Modesto Nuts	California League	Jerry Weinstein
A	Asheville Tourists	South Atlantic League	Joe Mikulik
A-Short Season	Tri-City Dust Devils	Northwest League	Fred Ocasio
Rookie	Casper Ghosts	Pioneer League	Tony Diaz

Records
Preceded by 2008	Colorado Rockies seasons 2009	Succeeded by 2010
