= 2009 San Diego Padres season =

2009 San Diego Padres
- League: National League
- Division: West
- Ballpark: Petco Park
- City: San Diego, California
- Record: 75–87 (.463)
- Divisional place: 4th
- Owners: John Moores
- General managers: Kevin Towers
- Managers: Bud Black
- Television: 4SD; Mark Neely, Tony Gwynn, Mark Grant; Cablemas (Spanish)
- Radio: XX Sports Radio; Jerry Coleman, Ted Leitner, Andy Masur; XEMO-AM (Spanish)

The 2009 San Diego Padres season was the 41st season in franchise history.

== Regular season ==
=== Season standings ===
NL West
Team	W	L	Pct.	GB	Home	Road
Los Angeles Dodgers	95	67	.586	—	50‍–‍31	45‍–‍36
Colorado Rockies	92	70	.568	3	51‍–‍30	41‍–‍40
San Francisco Giants	88	74	.543	7	52‍–‍29	36‍–‍45
San Diego Padres	75	87	.463	20	42‍–‍39	33‍–‍48
Arizona Diamondbacks	70	92	.432	25	36‍–‍45	34‍–‍47

=== Record vs. opponents ===
2009 National League record Source: MLB Standings Grid – 2009
Team	AZ	ATL	CHC	CIN	COL	FLA	HOU	LAD	MIL	NYM	PHI	PIT	SD	SF	STL	WAS	AL
Arizona	–	3–4	4-2	1–5	7-11	5–3	5–4	7-11	2–5	5–2	1–5	6–1	11-7	5-13	2–4	1–5	5–10
Atlanta	4–3	–	4–2	3–6	4–4	8-10	3-3	4–3	3–3	13–5	10-8	3–4	3–3	3–4	4–2	10-8	7–8
Chicago	2-4	2–4	–	10-5	2–4	4–3	11–6	3–5	10-7	3-3	1–5	10-4	4–5	4-2	6-10	5–2	6–9
Cincinnati	5-1	6-3	5-10	–	0-7	3-3	12-4	1-5	8-7	2-4	2-5	13-5	1-6	3-3	8-8	3-4	6-9
Colorado	11-7	4-4	4-2	7-0	–	2-4	2-5	4-14	6-0	3-4	2-4	6-3	10-8	8-10	6-1	6-0	11-4
Florida	3-5	10-8	3-4	3-3	4-2	–	4–3	3-3	3-4	11-7	9-9	2-4	4-2	3-4	3-3	12-6	10-8
Houston	4–5	3-3	6-11	4-12	5-2	3-4	–	4–3	5-10	1-5	6-2	10-5	6-1	2-4	6-9	3-3	6-9
Los Angeles	11-7	3-4	5-3	5-1	14-4	3-3	3-4	–	3–3	5-1	4-3	4-3	10-8	11-7	2-5	3-2	9-9
Milwaukee	5-2	3-3	7-10	7-8	0-6	4-3	10-5	3-3	–	3-3	4-3	9-5	2-4	4-5	9-9	5-3	5-10
New York	2-5	5-13	3-3	4-2	4-3	7-11	5-1	1-5	3-3	–	6-12	4-3	2-5	5-3	4-5	10-8	5–10
Philadelphia	5-1	8-10	5-1	5-2	4-2	9-9	2-6	3-4	3-4	12-6	–	4-2	5-2	3-4	4-1	15-3	6-12
Pittsburgh	1-6	4-3	4-10	5-13	3-6	4-2	5-10	3-4	5-9	3-4	2-4	–	3-4	2-4	5-10	5-3	8–7
San Diego	7-11	3-3	5-4	6-1	8-10	2-4	1-6	8-10	4-2	5-2	2-5	4-3	–	10-8	1-6	4-2	5–10
San Francisco	13-5	4–3	2–4	3–3	10-8	4–3	4–2	7-11	5-4	3–5	4–3	4–2	8-10	–	4–3	4–2	9–6
St. Louis	4-2	2-4	10-6	8-8	1-6	3-3	9-6	5-2	9-9	5-4	1-4	10-5	6-1	3-4	–	6–1	9–6
Washington	5-1	8-10	2-5	4-3	0-6	6-12	3-3	2-3	3-5	8-10	3-15	3-5	2-4	2-4	1-6	–	7–11

=== Roster ===
2009 San Diego Padres
Roster
Pitchers: 37 Mike Adams; 50 Josh Banks; 21 Heath Bell; 40 Greg Burke; 26 Cesar Carrillo; 29 Kevin Correia; 58 Eulogio De La Cruz; 56 Michael Ekstrom; 39 Ernesto Frieri; 63 Sean Gallagher; 49 Chad Gaudin; 52 Josh Geer; 57 Luke Gregerson; 34 Shawn Hill; 38 Mat Latos; 49 Wade LeBlanc; 38 Arturo López; 43 Cla Meredith; 46 Edwin Moreno; 45 Edward Mujica; 44 Jake Peavy; 59 Luis Perdomo; 43 Aaron Poreda; 34 Cesar Ramos; 41 Clayton Richard; 55 Adam Russell; 50 Duaner Sánchez; 27 Walter Silva; 46 Tim Stauffer; 54 Joe Thatcher; 58 Ryan Webb; 32 Chris Young	Catchers: 30 Eliézer Alfonzo; 28 Henry Blanco; 4 Nick Hundley; 26 José Lobatón; Infielders: 8 Chris Burke; 1 Everth Cabrera; 3,22 David Eckstein; 23 Adrián González; 2 Edgar Gonzalez; 5 Kevin Kouzmanoff; 15 Luis Rodríguez; 11 Craig Stansberry; 14 Josh Wilson; Outfielders: 8 Kyle Blanks; 3 Luis Durango; 16 Cliff Floyd; 33 Jody Gerut; 24 Brian Giles; 18 Tony Gwynn Jr.; 12 Scott Hairston; 7 Chase Headley; 11 Drew Macias; 14 Oscar Salazar; 25 Will Venable	Manager: 20 Bud Black; Coaches: 48 Darrel Akerfelds (bullpen); 36 Darren Balsley (pitching); 47 Glenn Hoffman (third base); Jim Lefebvre (hitting); 17 Rick Renteria (first base); 9 Ted Simmons (bench)

=== Game log ===
During the Padres 6-5 win over the New York Mets at Citi Field on April 13, 2009, Jody Gerut became the first player to open a new ballpark with a leadoff home run, hitting the first base hit and home run on the 3rd pitch off Mets starting pitcher Mike Pelfrey.

2009 Game Log
April (11–11)

#	Date	Opponent	Score	Win	Loss	Save	Attendance	Record
1	April 6	Dodgers	4–1	Kuroda (1–0)	Peavy (0–1)	Broxton (1)	45,496	0–1
2	April 7	Dodgers	4–2	Young (1–0)	Wolf (0–1)	Bell (1)	20,035	1–1
3	April 8	Dodgers	5–2	Billingsley (1–0)	Mujica (0–1)	Broxton (2)	31,700	1–2
4	April 9	Dodgers	4–3	Meredith (1–0)	Wade (0–1)	Bell (2)	29,710	2–2
5	April 10	Giants	7–3	Hill (1–0)	Zito (0–1)		20,507	3–2
6	April 11	Giants	6–3	Peavy (1–1)	Sánchez (0–1)	Bell (3)	35,305	4–2
7	April 12	Giants	6–1	Young (2–0)	Lincecum (0–1)		19,415	5–2
8	April 13	@ Mets	6–5	Mujica (1–1)	Stokes (0–1)	Bell (4)	41,007	6–2
9	April 15	@ Mets	7–2	Pérez (1–1)	Correia (0–1)		35,581	6–3
10	April 16	@ Mets	6–5	Peavy (2–1)	Maine (0–1)	Bell (5)	35,985	7–3
11	April 17	@ Phillies	8–7	Meredith (2–0)	Madson (1–1)	Bell (6)	44,984	8–3
12	April 18	@ Phillies	8–5	Meredith (3–0)	Lidge (0–1)	Bell (7)	45,007	9–3
13	April 19	@ Phillies	5–4	Condrey (2–0)	Moreno (0–1)		45,266	9–4
	April 20	@ Phillies	Postponed					
14	April 21	@ Giants	8–3	Cain (2–0)	Peavy (2–2)		39,314	9–5
15	April 22	@ Giants	1–0 (10)	Wilson (1–0)	Moreno (0–2)		26,593	9–6
16	April 24	Pirates	4–3 (11)	Moreno (1–2)	Capps (0–1)		25,601	10–6
17	April 25	Pirates	10–1	Duke (3–1)	Hill (1–1)		41,665	10–7
18	April 26	Pirates	8–3	Ohlendorf (2–2)	Peavy (2–3)		30,848	10–8
19	April 27	@ Rockies	12–7	Grilli (1–1)	Young (2–1)		18,246	10–9
20	April 28	@ Rockies	4–3	Sánchez (1–0)	Corpas (0–2)	Bell (8)	19,346	11–9
21	April 29	@ Rockies	7–5	Cook (1–1)	Correia (0–2)	Street (2)	20,289	11–10
22	April 30	@ Dodgers	8–5	Belisario (1–2)	Gregerson (0–1)	Broxton (7)	54,628	11–11

May (14–14)

#	Date	Opponent	Score	Win	Loss	Save	Attendance	Record
23	May 1	@ Dodgers	1–0	Broxton (3–0)	Sánchez (1–1)		47,210	11–12
24	May 2	@ Dodgers	2–1 (10)	Mota (2–0)	Gregerson (0–2)		47,680	11–13
25	May 3	@ Dodgers	7–3	Billingsley (5–0)	Gaudin (0–1)		52,096	11–14
26	May 4	Rockies	9–6	Rusch (1–0)	Moreno (1–3)	Street (3)	14,717	11–15
27	May 5	Rockies	2–1 (10)	Bell (1–0)	Daley (0–1)		13,646	12–15
28	May 6	Diamondbacks	3–1	Garland (3–1)	Peavy (2–4)	Qualls (7)	15,092	12–16
29	May 7	Diamondbacks	4–3 (10)	Meredith (4–0)	Vásquez (0–1)		18,921	13–16
30	May 8	@ Astros	2–0	Rodríguez (3–2)	Gaudin (0–2)	Hawkins (4)	28,139	13–17
31	May 9	@ Astros	5–4	Hawkins (1–0)	Gregerson (0–3)		29,141	13–18
32	May 10	@ Astros	12–5	Oswalt (1–2)	Geer (0–1)		30,023	13–19
33	May 12	@ Cubs	6–2	Harden (4–1)	Peavy (2–5)		39,963	13–20
34	May 13	@ Cubs	6–4 (8)	Lilly (5–2)	Young (2–2)	Mármol (3)	38,410	13–21
35	May 14	@ Cubs	11–3	Dempster (3–2)	Gaudin (0–3)		39,728	13–22
36	May 15	Reds	5–3	Correia (1–2)	Harang (3–4)	Bell (9)	27,021	14–22
37	May 16	Reds	6–5 (16)	Perdomo (1–0)	Owings (3–4)		31,001	15–22
38	May 17	Reds	3–1	Peavy (3–5)	Arroyo (5–3)		21,123	16–22
39	May 19	Giants	2–1	Young (3–2)	Zito (1–4)	Bell (10)	16,175	17–22
40	May 20	Giants	2–1	Gaudin (1–3)	Sánchez (1–4)	Bell (11)	15,208	18–22
41	May 21	Giants	3–2	Bell (2–0)	Wilson (2–3)		19,921	19–22
42	May 22	Cubs	4–0	Peavy (4–5)	Zambrano (3–2)	Bell (12)	27,260	20–22
43	May 23	Cubs	3–1	Geer (1–1)	Wells (0–1)	Mujica (1)	37,798	21–22
44	May 24	Cubs	7–2	Young (4–2)	Lilly (5–4)		39,593	22–22
45	May 25	@ Diamondbacks	9–7 (10)	Mujica (2–1)	Peña (4–2)	Bell (13)	30,546	23–22
46	May 26	@ Diamondbacks	6–5	Scherzer (2–3)	Correia (1–3)	Gutiérrez (1)	18,631	23–23
47	May 27	@ Diamondbacks	8–5	Peavy (5–5)	Buckner (1–1)	Bell (14)	18,264	24–23
48	May 29	@ Rockies	3–0	Marquis (7–3)	Young (4–3)	Street (8)	23,239	24–24
49	May 30	@ Rockies	8–7	Street (1–1)	Bell (2–1)		32,064	24–25
50	May 31	@ Rockies	5–2	Gaudin (2–3)	de la Rosa (0–6)	Bell (15)	30,223	25–25

June (9–17)

#	Date	Opponent	Score	Win	Loss	Save	Attendance	Record
51	June 1	Phillies	5–3	Blanton (4–3)	Correia (1–4)	Lidge (13)	22,825	25–26
52	June 2	Phillies	10–5	Bastardo (1–0)	Peavy (5–6)	Madson (2)	17,625	25–27
53	June 3	Phillies	5–1	Happ (4–0)	Young (4–4)		15,436	25–28
54	June 5	Diamondbacks	8–0	Davis (3–6)	Gaudin (2–4)		22,426	25–29
55	June 6	Diamondbacks	6–4	Correia (2–4)	Schlereth (0–2)	Bell (16)	23,592	26–29
56	June 7	Diamondbacks	9–6 (18)	Rosales (1–0)	Wilson (0–1)		27,804	26–30
57	June 8	Diamondbacks	6–3	Peavy (6–6)	Garland (4–6)	Bell (17)	17,501	27–30
58	June 9	@ Dodgers	6–4	Billingsley (8–3)	Young (4–5)	Broxton (14)	35,313	27–31
59	June 10	@ Dodgers	3–1	Correia (3–4)	Kershaw (3–5)	Bell (18)	44,079	28–31
60	June 12	@ Angels	11–6	Palmer (6–0)	Gaudin (2–5)		41,597	28–32
61	June 13	@ Angels	9–1	Saunders (7–4)	Geer (1–2)		43,233	28–33
62	June 14	@ Angels	6–0	Weaver (7–2)	Young (4–6)		40,163	28–34
63	June 16	Mariners	5–0	Hernández (7–3)	Correia (3–5)		17,040	28–35
64	June 17	Mariners	4–3	Olson (2–1)	Gaudin (2–6)	Aardsma (12)	20,224	28–36
65	June 18	Mariners	4–3	Bell (3–1)	Batista (3–2)		25,146	29–36
66	June 19	Athletics	7–5	Wuertz (3–1)	Mujica (2–2)	Bailey (7)	20,019	29–37
67	June 20	Athletics	6–3	Wuertz (4–1)	Meredith (4–1)	Bailey (8)	28,074	29–38
68	June 21	Athletics	4–1	Correia (4–5)	Braden (5–6)	Bell (19)	27,249	30–38
69	June 23	@ Mariners	9–7	Gaudin (3–6)	Olson (2–2)	Bell (20)	23,537	31–38
70	June 24	@ Mariners	4–3	White (2–0)	Mujica (2–3)	Aardsma (15)	22,988	31–39
71	June 25	@ Mariners	9–3	Washburn (4–5)	LeBlanc (0–1)		27,968	31–40
72	June 26	@ Rangers	12–2	Millwood (8–5)	Silva (0–1)		33,340	31–41
73	June 27	@ Rangers	7–3	Correia (5–5)	Holland (1–5)		25,410	32–41
74	June 28	@ Rangers	2–0	Gaudin (4–6)	Hunter (0–1)	Bell (21)	27,000	33–41
75	June 29	Astros	3–1	Oswalt (4–4)	Geer (1–3)		15,671	33–42
76	June 30	Astros	4–3	Banks (1–0)	Sampson (4–1)	Bell (22)	15,276	34–42

July (8–20)

#	Date	Opponent	Score	Win	Loss	Save	Attendance	Record
77	July 1	Astros	7–1	Moehler (5–4)	Silva (0–2)		16,670	34–43
78	July 2	Astros	7–2	Rodríguez (7–6)	Correia (5–6)		23,284	34–44
79	July 3	Dodgers	6–3	Kuroda (3–4)	Gaudin (4–7)	Broxton (20)	42,217	34–45
80	July 4	Dodgers	7–4	Burke (1–0)	Belisario (1–3)	Bell (23)	42,069	35–45
81	July 5	Dodgers	7–6	Weaver (5–2)	Mujica (2–4)		30,070	35–46
82	July 6	@ Diamondbacks	6–5	Rauch (1–0)	Meredith (4–2)		17,528	35–47
83	July 7	@ Diamondbacks	4–3	Davis (4–8)	Correia (5–7)	Qualls (16)	18,619	35–48
84	July 8	@ Diamondbacks	6–2	Zavada (2–2)	Burke (1–1)		20,791	35–49
85	July 9	@ Giants	9–3	Lincecum (10–2)	Geer (1–4)		33,508	35–50
86	July 10	@ Giants	8–0	Sánchez (3–8)	Banks (1–1)		30,298	35–51
87	July 11	@ Giants	2–1	Miller (2–1)	Stauffer (0–1)	Wilson (23)	38,112	35–52
88	July 12	@ Giants	10–4	Correia (6–7)	Zito (5–9)		41,913	36–52
89	July 16	Rockies	10–1	Cook (9–3)	Gaudin (4–8)		22,758	36–53
90	July 17	Rockies	5–3	Jiménez (7–9)	Geer (1–5)	Street (23)	21,887	36–54
91	July 18	Rockies	3–1	Burke (2–1)	Peralta (0–3)	Bell (24)	28,652	37–54
92	July 19	Rockies	6–1	Marquis (12–6)	Latos (0–1)		20,747	37–55
93	July 20	Marlins	3–2	VandenHurk (1–0)	Burke (2–2)	Núñez (5)	17,184	37–56
94	July 21	Marlins	3–2	Volstad (7–9)	Gaudin (4–9)	Núñez (6)	20,311	37–57
95	July 22	Marlins	5–0	Nolasco (7–7)	Geer (1–6)		16,450	37–58
96	July 23	@ Phillies	9–4	Hamels (6–5)	Correia (6–8)		45,242	37–59
97	July 24	@ Nationals	6–2	Latos (1–1)	Mock (0–4)		23,506	38–59
98	July 25	@ Nationals	13–1	Clippard (1–0)	Stauffer (0–2)		21,834	38–60
99	July 26	@ Nationals	3–2	Beimel (1–5)	Burke (2–3)		20,747	38–61
100	July 27	@ Reds	6–4	Bailey (2–2)	Geer (1–7)	Cordero (23)	18,563	38–62
101	July 28	@ Reds	3–2				14,526	39–62
102	July 29	@ Reds	7–1				17,201	40–62
103	July 30	@ Reds	7–4				19,117	41–62
104	July 31	Brewers	11–7				32,588	42–62

August (15–14)

#	Date	Opponent	Score	Win	Loss	Save	Attendance	Record
105	August 1	Brewers	4–2				26,424	43–62
106	August 2	Brewers	6–1				23,696	43–63
107	August 3	Braves	4–2				20,423	44–63
108	August 4	Braves	9–2				17,916	44–64
109	August 5	Braves	6–2				21,816	44–65
110	August 6	Mets	8–3				18,880	45–65
111	August 7	Mets	6–2				23,038	46–65
112	August 8	Mets	3–1				35,184	47–65
113	August 9	Mets	5–1				27,754	47–66
114	August 11	@ Brewers	13–6				37,040	48–66
115	August 12	@ Brewers	6–5				38,753	49–66
116	August 13	@ Brewers	12–9				39,683	49–67
117	August 14	@ Cardinals	9–2				42,208	49–68
118	August 15	@ Cardinals	7–4				44,292	49–69
119	August 16	@ Cardinals	7–5				40,812	49–70
120	August 17	Cubs	4–1				23,420	50–70
121	August 18	Cubs	6–3				19,814	51–70
122	August 19	Cubs	7–1				18,012	51–71
123	August 20	Cardinals	5–1				19,867	51–72
124	August 21	Cardinals	4–0				27,282	52–72
125	August 22	Cardinals	7–0				38,156	52–73
126	August 23	Cardinals	5–2				27,435	52–74
127	August 25	@ Braves	2–1 (12)				15,389	53–74
128	August 26	@ Braves	12–5				15,619	54–74
129	August 27	@ Braves	9–1				18,651	54–75
130	August 28	@ Marlins	9–5				14,402	55–75
131	August 29	@ Marlins	7–4				20,924	56–75
132	August 30	@ Marlins	6–4				12,873	56–76
133	August 31	Nationals	3–1				19,867	57–76

September/October (18–11)

#	Date	Opponent	Score	Win	Loss	Save	Attendance	Record
134	September 1	Nationals	4–1				15,131	58–76
135	September 2	Nationals	7–0				14,468	59–76
136	September 4	@ Dodgers	2–0				52,965	60–76
137	September 5	@ Dodgers	7–4				53,368	60–77
138	September 6	@ Dodgers	4–3				47,528	61–77
139	September 7	@ Giants	9–4				37,132	61–78
140	September 8	@ Giants	4–3				34,524	62–78
141	September 9	@ Giants	4–2				30,312	63–78
142	September 11	Rockies	4–1				18,022	63–79
143	September 12	Rockies	3–2 (10)				19,897	64–79
144	September 13	Rockies	7–3				19,739	65–79
145	September 14	Diamondbacks	4–2 (10)				20,265	65–80
146	September 15	Diamondbacks	4–2				14,790	65–81
147	September 16	Diamondbacks	6–5 (10)				14,377	66–81
148	September 18	@ Pirates	5–1				26,178	66–82
149	September 19	@ Pirates	2–1				20,379	67–82
150	September 20	@ Pirates	4–0				24,028	68–82
151	September 21	@ Pirates	11–6 (11)				12,566	69–82
152	September 22	@ Rockies	11–10				30,695	69–83
153	September 23	@ Rockies	6–3				29,597	70–83
154	September 24	@ Rockies	5–4				37,049	71–83
155	September 25	@ Diamondbacks	4–0				29,731	72–83
156	September 26	@ Diamondbacks	8–5				39,326	72–84
157	September 27	@ Diamondbacks	7–4				30,017	72–85
158	September 29	Dodgers	3–1				25,318	73–85
159	September 30	Dodgers	5–0				25,469	74–85
160	October 2	Giants	7–2				26,776	74–86
161	October 3	Giants	2–0				25,732	75–86
162	October 4	Giants	4–3 (10)				25,082	75–87

Please do not edit this line: OgreBot End-->

== Player stats ==
=== Batting ===
Note: G = Games played; AB = At bats; R = Runs scored; H = Hits; 2B = Doubles; 3B = Triples; HR = Home runs; RBI = Runs batted in; AVG = Batting average; SB = Stolen bases

Player	G	AB	R	H	2B	3B	HR	RBI	AVG	SB
Brian Giles	61	225	18	43	10	1	2	23	.191	1
Eliézer Alfonzo	37	114	6	20	3	0	2	8	.175	0
Adrián González	160	552	90	153	27	2	40	99	.277	1
Henry Blanco	67	204	21	48	12	0	6	16	.235	0
Jody Gerut	37	113	17	25	6	0	4	14	.221	2
Everth Cabrera	103	377	59	96	18	8	2	31	.255	25
Kevin Kouzmanoff	141	529	50	135	31	1	18	88	.255	1
Oscar Salazar	55	108	12	29	8	2	3	19	.269	0
David Eckstein	136	503	64	131	27	2	2	51	.260	3
Kyle Blanks	54	148	24	37	9	0	10	22	.250	1
Chase Headley	156	543	62	142	31	2	12	64	.262	10
Tony Gwynn Jr.	119	393	59	106	11	6	2	21	.270	11
Will Venable	95	293	38	75	14	2	12	38	.256	6
Nick Hundley	78	256	23	61	15	2	8	30	.238	5
Scott Hairston	56	197	26	59	14	1	10	29	.299	8
Luis Rodríguez	93	208	18	42	6	0	2	16	.202	1
Edgar Gonzalez	82	153	16	33	8	2	4	18	.216	1
Drew Macias	51	76	8	15	6	0	1	7	.197	0
Chris Burke	32	82	8	17	5	0	1	5	.207	4
Josh Wilson	16	38	2	4	2	0	0	1	.105	0
Cliff Floyd	10	16	0	2	0	0	0	0	.125	0
José Lobatón	7	17	0	3	0	0	0	0	.176	0
Luis Durango	9	11	3	6	0	0	0	0	.545	2
Craig Stansberry	1	1	0	0	0	0	0	0	.000	0
Pitcher totals	162	268	14	33	2	0	0	5	.123	0
Team totals	162	5425	638	1315	265	31	141	605	.242	82

=== Pitching ===
Note: W = Wins; L = Losses; ERA = Earned run average; G = Games pitched; GS = Games started; SV = Saves; IP = Innings pitched; R = Runs allowed; ER = Earned runs allowed; BB = Walks allowed; K = Strikeouts

Player	W	L	ERA	G	GS	SV	IP	H	R	ER	BB	K
Jake Peavy	6	6	3.97	13	13	0	81.2	69	37	36	28	92
Chris Young	4	6	5.21	14	14	0	76.0	70	45	44	40	50
Tim Stauffer	4	7	3.58	14	14	0	73.0	71	29	29	34	53
Ryan Webb	2	1	3.86	28	0	0	25.2	27	11	11	11	19
Kevin Correia	12	11	3.91	33	33	0	198.0	194	86	86	64	142
Greg Burke	3	3	4.14	48	0	0	45.2	48	21	21	23	33
Josh Geer	1	7	5.96	19	17	0	102.2	116	69	68	23	54
Wade LeBlanc	3	1	3.69	9	9	0	46.1	35	19	19	19	30
Chad Gaudin	4	10	5.13	20	19	0	105.1	105	60	60	56	105
Clayton Richard	5	2	4.08	12	12	0	64.0	60	29	29	34	48
Luke Gregerson	2	4	3.24	72	0	1	75.0	62	27	27	31	93
Adam Russell	3	1	3.65	15	0	0	12.1	13	5	5	11	14
Edwin Moreno	1	3	4.84	19	0	0	22.1	28	13	12	15	15
Edward Mujica	3	5	3.94	67	4	2	93.2	101	43	41	19	76
Shawn Hill	1	1	5.25	3	3	0	12.0	15	7	7	3	7
Heath Bell	6	4	2.71	68	0	42	69.2	54	21	21	24	79
Joe Thatcher	1	0	2.80	52	0	0	45.0	37	14	14	18	55
Luis Perdomo	1	0	4.80	35	0	0	60.0	57	36	32	34	55
Mat Latos	4	5	4.62	10	10	0	50.2	43	29	26	23	39
Mike Adams	0	0	0.73	37	0	0	37.0	14	9	3	8	45
Cla Meredith	4	2	4.17	35	0	0	36.2	47	19	17	13	20
Walter Silva	0	2	8.76	6	6	0	24.2	34	28	24	15	11
Josh Banks	1	1	7.15	6	3	0	22.2	30	18	18	4	9
Michael Ekstrom	0	0	6.38	12	0	0	18.1	21	14	13	8	19
Cesar Ramos	0	1	3.07	5	2	0	14.2	19	5	5	4	10
Duaner Sánchez	1	1	9.00	12	0	0	11.0	18	11	11	8	2
Cesar Carrillo	1	2	13.06	3	3	0	10.1	16	15	15	12	4
Sean Gallagher	2	0	0.00	8	0	0	5.1	5	0	0	5	4
Eulogio De La Cruz	0	0	5.40	3	0	0	3.1	2	2	2	6	2
Aaron Poreda	0	0	3.86	4	0	0	2.1	1	1	1	5	0
Arturo López	0	0	19.29	4	0	0	2.1	7	5	5	3	0
Ernesto Frieri	0	0	0.00	2	0	0	2.0	0	0	0	1	2
Josh Wilson	0	1	27.00	1	0	0	1.0	3	3	3	1	0
Team totals	75	87	4.37	162	162	45	1450.2	1422	769	704	603	1187

== Farm system ==
Level	Team	League	Manager
AAA	Portland Beavers	Pacific Coast League	Randy Ready
AA	San Antonio Missions	Texas League	Terry Kennedy
A	Lake Elsinore Storm	California League	Carlos Lezcano
A	Fort Wayne TinCaps	Midwest League	Doug Dascenzo
A-Short Season	Eugene Emeralds	Northwest League	Greg Riddoch
Rookie	AZL Padres	Arizona League	José Flores

LEAGUE CHAMPIONS: Fort Wayne
