= Luis Perdomo =

Luis Perdomo may refer to:

- Luis Perdomo (baseball, born 1984), Dominican professional baseball pitcher for the San Diego Padres and Minnesota Twins
- Luis Perdomo (baseball, born 1993), Dominican professional baseball pitcher for the Milwaukee Brewers
- Luis Perdomo (pianist, born 1971), Venezuelan jazz pianist, based in New York City
