= Mike McCoy (baseball) =

American baseball player and coach (born 1981)

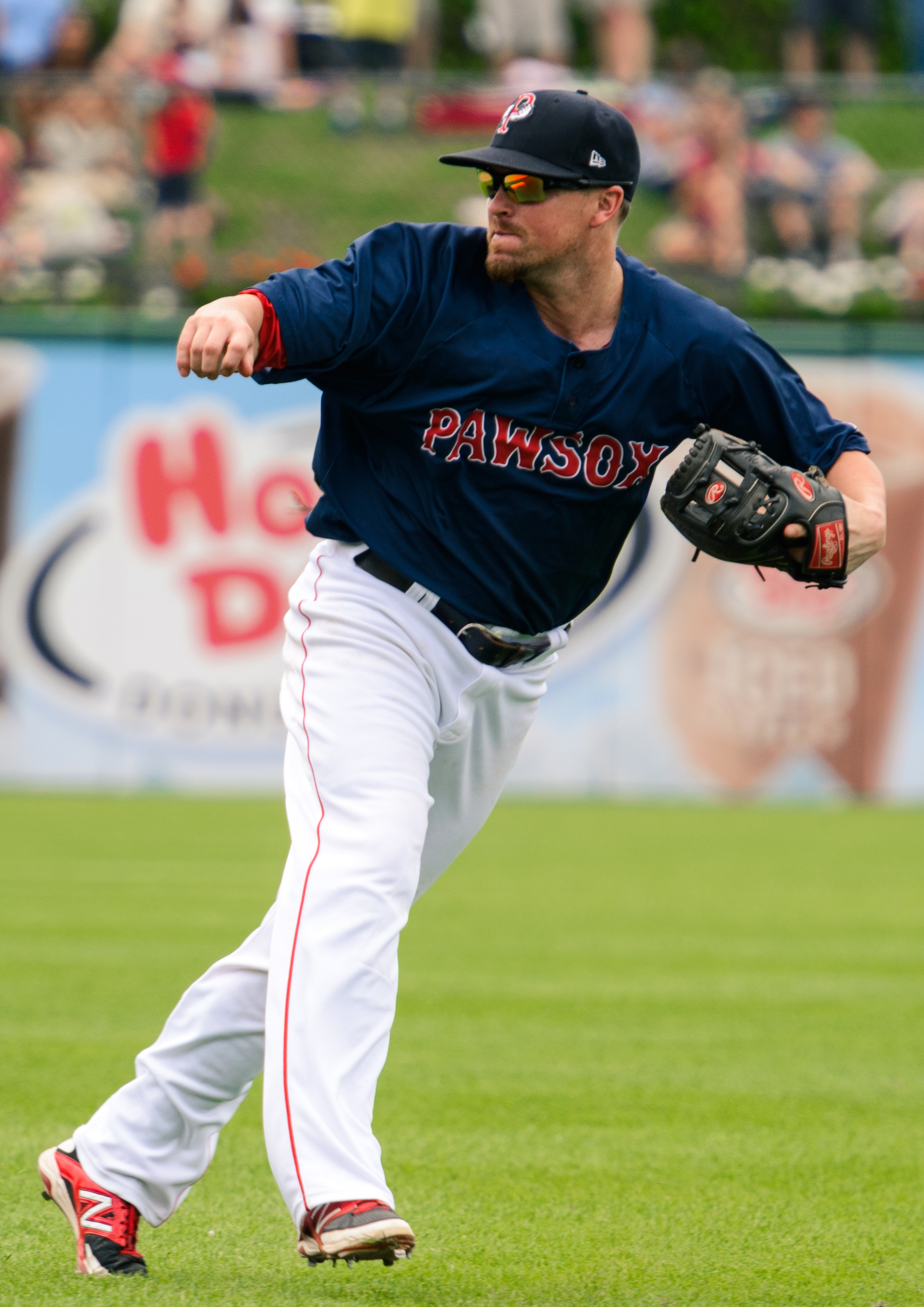
- McCoy with the Pawtucket Red Sox

San Diego Padres – No. 89
- Utility player / Coach
- Born: April 2, 1981 (age 45); San Diego, California, U.S.
- Batted: Right Threw: Right

MLB debut
- September 9, 2009, for the Colorado Rockies

Last MLB appearance
- October 3, 2012, for the Toronto Blue Jays

MLB statistics
- Batting average: .190
- Home runs: 3
- Runs batted in: 20
- Stats at Baseball Reference

Teams
- Colorado Rockies (2009); Toronto Blue Jays (2010–2012); As coach: San Diego Padres (2024–present)

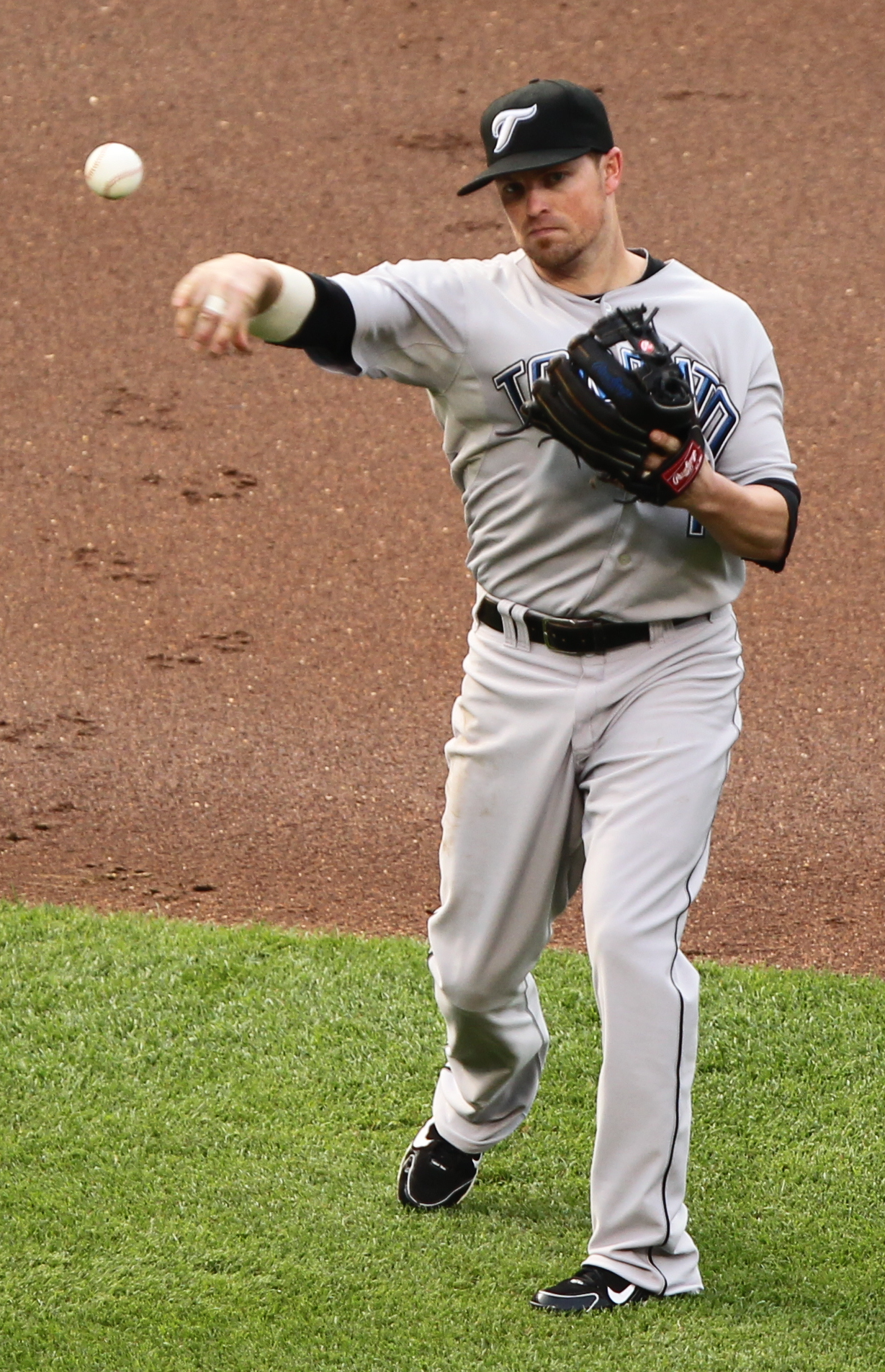
McCoy during his tenure with the Toronto Blue Jays.

Michael Howard McCoy (born April 2, 1981) is an American former professional baseball utility player and coach. He is an assistant hitting coach for the San Diego Padres of Major League Baseball and played in Major League Baseball (MLB) for the Colorado Rockies and Toronto Blue Jays. In his career, McCoy played every position, with the exception of catcher and first base.

== Early life ==
McCoy attended Grossmont High School in El Cajon, California, before playing for the San Diego Toreros baseball team from 2000-2002. In 2001, he played collegiate summer baseball with the Chatham A's of the Cape Cod Baseball League and was named a league all-star. As a junior McCoy led the Toreros in doubles (16) and stolen bases (26), helping the University of San Diego capture the 2002 West Coast Conference title with teammates like Jason Marian (baseball).

== Professional career ==
=== St. Louis Cardinals ===
McCoy was selected by the St. Louis Cardinals in the 34th round (1,032nd overall) of the 2002 Major League Baseball draft. The infielder logged time at all three levels of the minors during his six-year run in the Cardinals system, capturing an Appalachian League All-Star nod for Johnson City in 2002 and leading Springfield in stolen bases (30) in 2006.

=== Baltimore Orioles ===
On May 22, 2006, McCoy was dealt to the Baltimore Orioles for future considerations.

=== Colorado Rockies ===
McCoy was traded again to the Colorado Rockies on July 19, 2006 for Juan Castro.

McCoy hit .307 with five triples, 102 runs and 40 steals for the Sky Sox. On September 8, 2009 he was called up from Triple-A Colorado Springs Sky Sox and debuted in MLB one day later on September 9 against the Cincinnati Reds.

=== Toronto Blue Jays ===
Over the 2009-2010 offseason he was designated for assignment, and was claimed by the Toronto Blue Jays. He made their 2010 opening day roster, appearing in 46 games. In 2011, he made the opening day roster for the second season in a row.

On June 11, 2011, McCoy made his first major league pitching appearance (he also pitched 3.2 innings in a minor league game in 2009) in a 16–4 loss to the Boston Red Sox, throwing a perfect 9th inning. His repertoire appeared to include a fastball topping out at 86 mph, a changeup, a curveball, and a knuckleball at low 60's to mid 70's. McCoy became the fifth position player to pitch for the Blue Jays, with the last being Frank Menechino on August 28, 2004. He was optioned back to Triple-A Las Vegas on June 23 to make room for Eric Thames on the 40 man roster.

On May 29, 2012, McCoy was recalled from Triple-A Las Vegas. Eric Thames was sent down to make room for McCoy. McCoy was returned to Triple-A Las Vegas 51s on June 25. McCoy was called up to the Jays on August 11 after Colby Rasmus tweaked his groin for the second time that month.

McCoy was designated for assignment on November 20, 2012. On November 30, he was sent outright to the Blue Jays Triple-A affiliate Buffalo Bisons. McCoy spent the 2013 season with the Blue Jays' Triple-A affiliate Buffalo Bisons.

=== Boston Red Sox ===
McCoy was signed to a minor league contract with spring training invitation by the Boston Red Sox on November 15, 2013. He spent the 2014 season with the Pawtucket Red Sox, and was granted free agency on November 4, 2014.

=== San Diego Padres ===
The San Diego Padres signed McCoy to a minor-league contract on February 23, 2015.

=== Retirement ===
In 2016, McCoy became the coach of the Lake Elsinore Storm. In 2017, he became the coach of the AZL Padres. In 2018, he was announced as the manager of the Tri-City Dust Devils. All of the teams are minor-league affiliates of the major-league team San Diego Padres.
