= Greg Burke (baseball) =

American baseball player (born 1982)

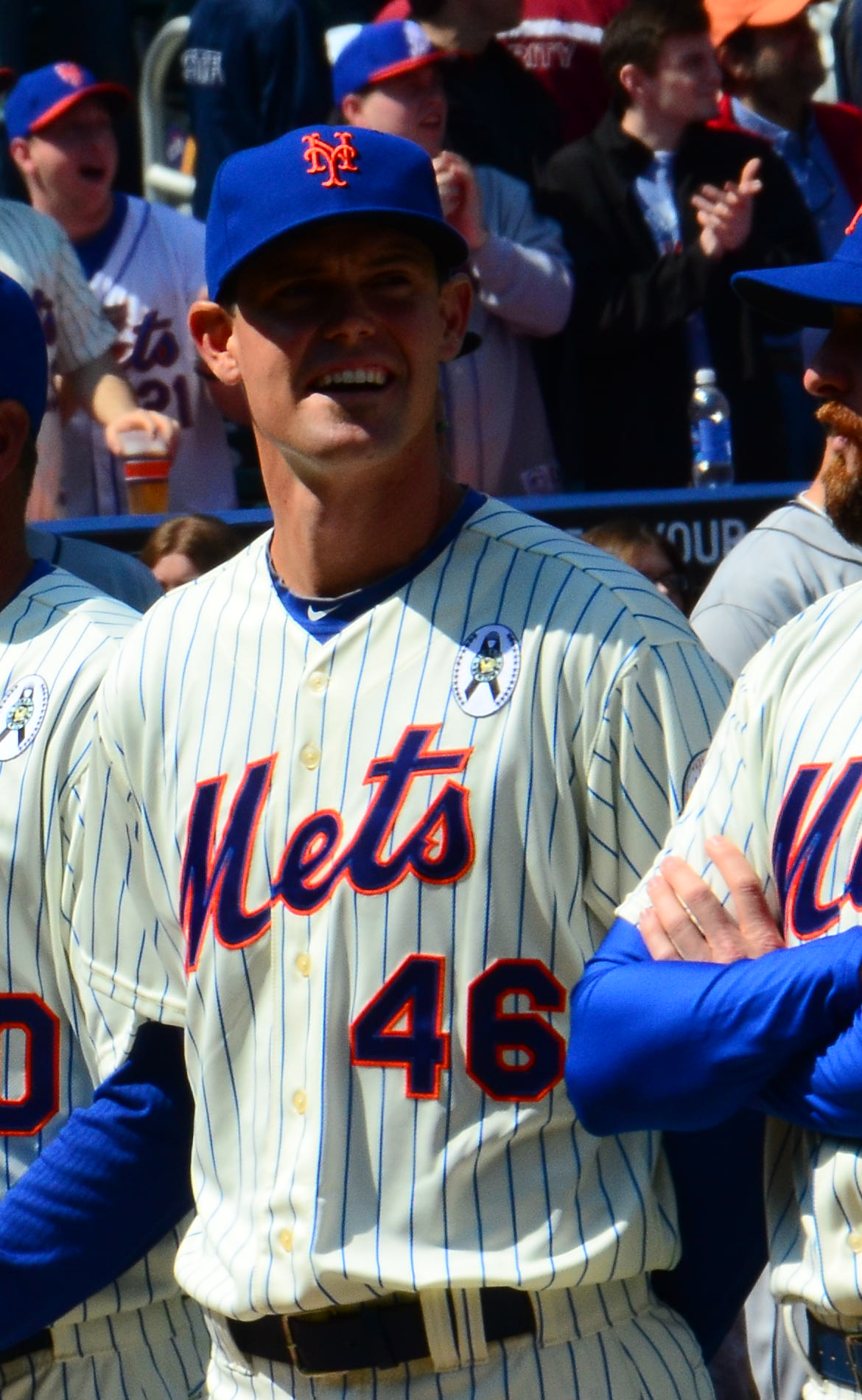
- Burke with the New York Mets
- Pitcher
- Born: September 21, 1982 (age 43); Bellmawr, New Jersey, U.S.
- Batted: Right Threw: Right

MLB debut
- May 16, 2009, for the San Diego Padres

Last MLB appearance
- September 23, 2013, for the New York Mets

MLB statistics
- Win–loss record: 3–6
- Earned run average: 4.77
- Strikeouts: 61
- Stats at Baseball Reference

Teams
- San Diego Padres (2009); New York Mets (2013)

Gregory Francis Burke (born September 21, 1982) is an American former professional baseball pitcher. He attended Duke University, and played in Major League Baseball (MLB) for the San Diego Padres and New York Mets.

Born in the Bellmawr, New Jersey. Burke played prep baseball at Gloucester Catholic High School.

== Amateur career ==
Burke was selected by the New York Mets in the 42nd round (1262nd overall) of the 2000 Major League Baseball draft, but opted to play at Duke University from 2001 until 2005.

== Professional career ==
=== San Diego Padres ===
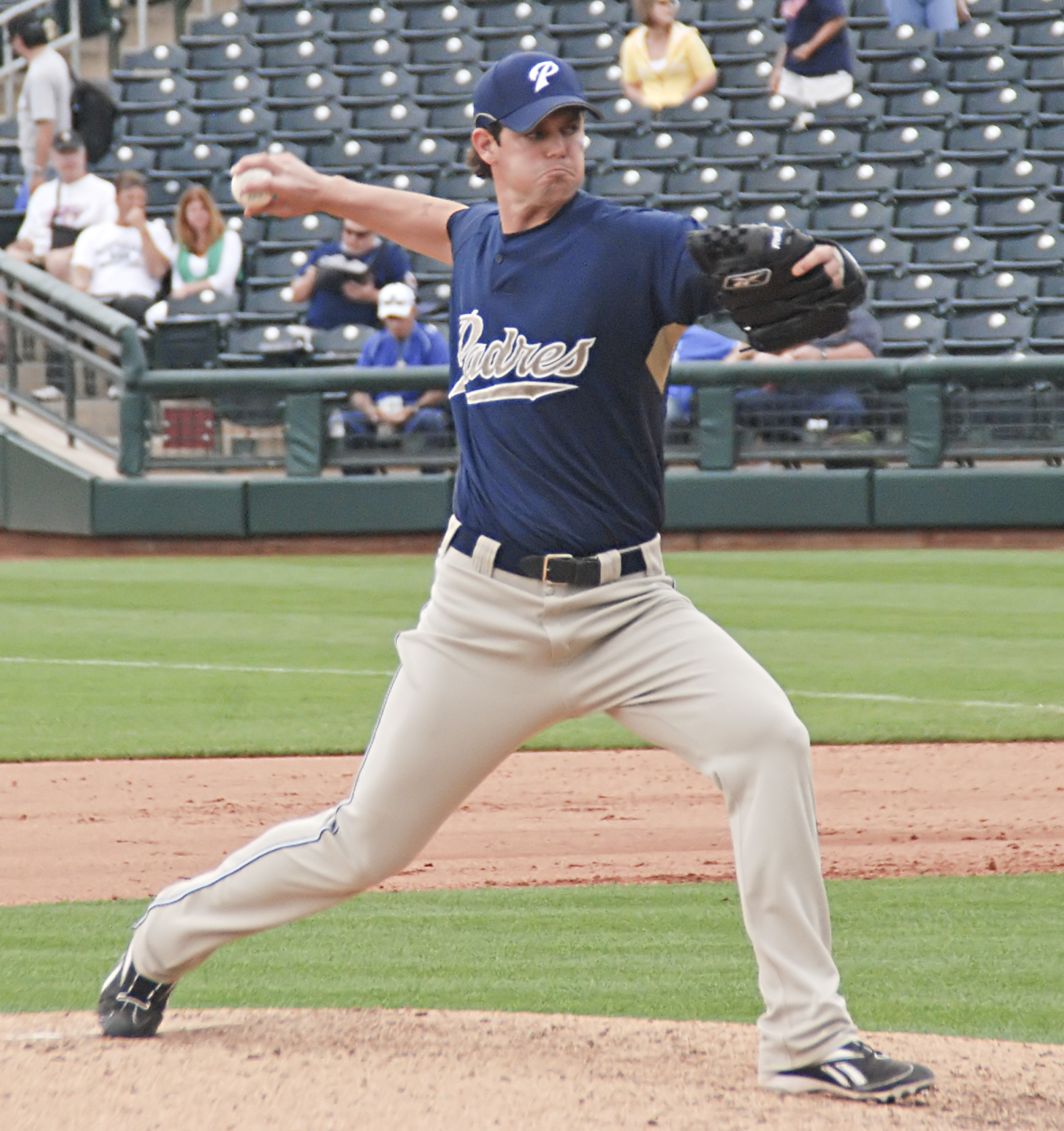
Burke pitching for the San Diego Padres in 2009 spring training

On February 27, 2006, Burke signed a minor league deal with the San Diego Padres out of tryout camp. He played with the Atlantic City Surf, then of the Atlantic League in 2005. Burke split the 2006 season with Single-A Fort Wayne, then the Wizards, and High-A Lake Elsinore. Burke started at Lake Elsinore, where in 12 games, he had a 5.79 ERA as a reliever. He was then demoted to Fort Wayne, where as a starter, he went 6–5 with a 3.58 ERA while striking out 87 in 120.2 innings. Burke spent all of 2007 with Lake Elsinore, pitching 4–4 with a 5.23 ERA while striking out 67 in 96.1 innings pitched. Burke pitched 2008 with Double-A San Antonio, where he went 2–7 with a 2.24 ERA with 23 saves while striking out 92 in 84.1 innings. He was a mid-season all star in the Texas League. Burke began 2009 with Triple-A Portland, where he pitched 3–0 in 13 games with a 2.25 ERA. Burke was called up to the Padres' roster on May 15, 2009. In 48 games with the Padres, Burke pitched 3–3 with a 4.14 ERA while striking out 33. Burke spent all of 2010 with Portland, where he had a 5.68 ERA in 53 games while striking out 46. Burke spent all of 2011 with the Padres' new Triple-A affiliate, Tucson, where he pitched in a career-high 64 games, striking out 76 with a 5.70 ERA.

=== Baltimore Orioles ===
On February 10, 2012, Burke signed a minor league deal with the Baltimore Orioles. Towards the end of spring training, he was likely to be released, but he told the Orioles director of pitching development Rick Peterson he was experimenting with a sidearm delivery. After throwing a bullpen with him, Peterson liked what he saw, and he was given an opportunity during the season. Burke began the year with Double-A Bowie, where he had a 1.53 ERA in 23 games with 20 strikeouts and 14 saves. Burke was promoted to Triple-A Norfolk, where he pitched 2–1 with a 1.53 ERA in 21 games with 30 strikeouts.

=== New York Mets ===
On November 7, 2012, Burke signed a minor league deal with the New York Mets with an invitation to spring training. After giving up 5 runs in 9 innings and striking out 12 in spring training, Burke made the Opening Day roster. In his first appearance, against the Padres, he gave up a run in 0.2 innings. After pitching in both games of a double-header at the Rockies on April 16, he was optioned to Triple-A Las Vegas, and was replaced by Jeurys Familia. In April with the Mets, he went 0–1 with a 7.36 ERA and a .303 OBA. After a month in Las Vegas, he was recalled by the Mets to replace Familia, who went on the disabled list. Burke had a very good May with the Mets, where in 8 appearances, he gave up no earned runs in 7.2 innings with a .172 OBA. He would go down and up three more times before he finished the season with the Mets in September. In 32 games, he went 0–3 with a 5.68 ERA and a .312 OBA, striking out 28 in 31.2 innings. He was outrighted off the roster on October 17, 2013, and elected free agency.

=== Colorado Rockies ===
Exactly one year after he signed a minor league deal with the Mets, Burke signed a minor league deal with the Colorado Rockies on November 6, 2013. Burke also received offers from the New York Mets and Toronto Blue Jays, but he decided to take a minor league deal with the Rockies that allowed him to join them in spring training to try and compete for a job in the bullpen. Burke played in the Blue Jays organization for the 2015 season, and elected free agency on November 6, 2015.

=== Philadelphia Phillies ===
Burke signed with the Philadelphia Phillies as a minor league free agent on November 23, 2015. He was released in March 2016.
