= Adam Russell (baseball) =

American baseball player (born 1983)

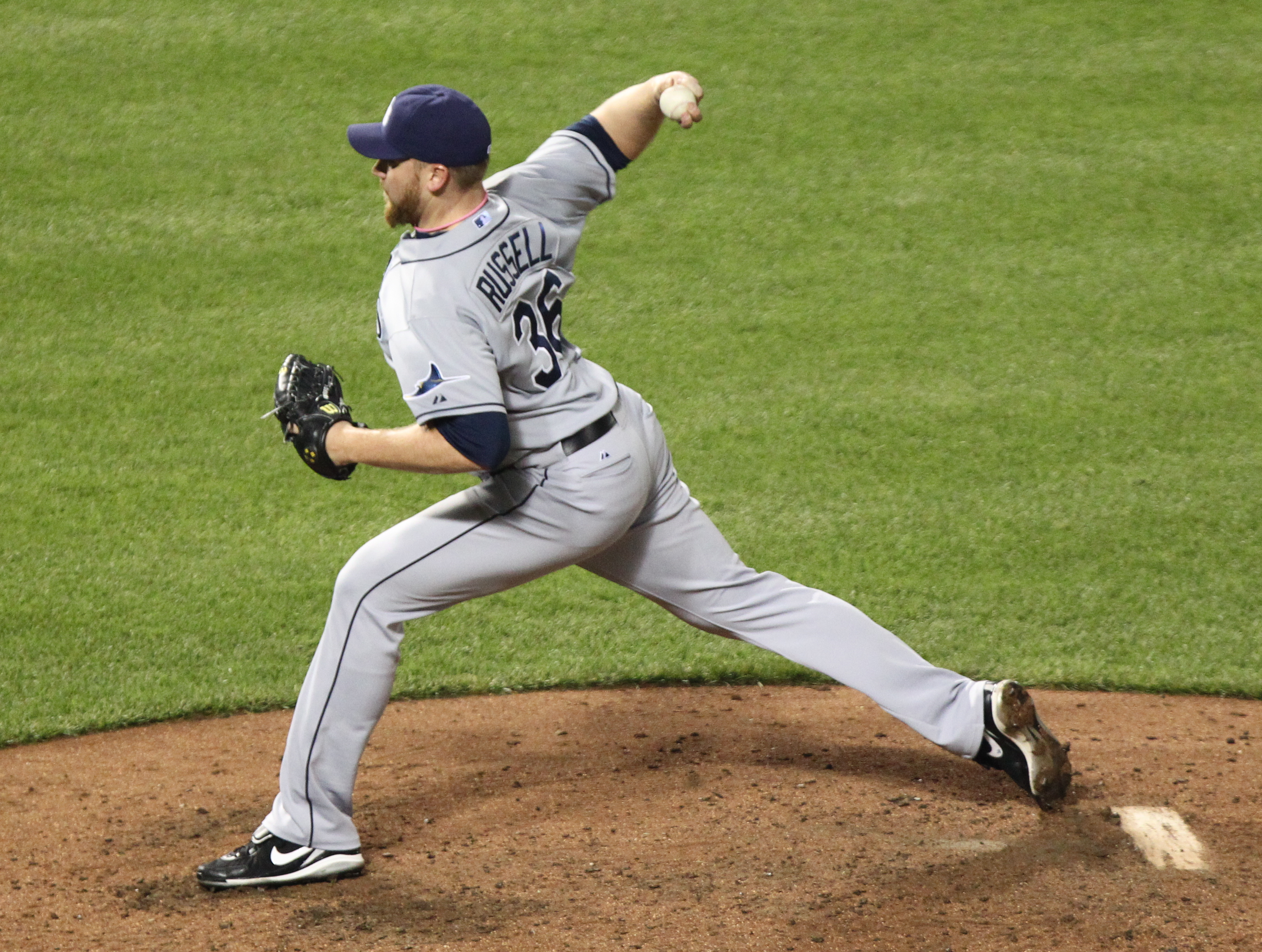
- Russell with the Tampa Bay Rays
- Pitcher
- Born: April 14, 1983 (age 43); North Olmsted, Ohio, U.S.
- Batted: Right Threw: Right

MLB debut
- June 17, 2008, for the Chicago White Sox

Last MLB appearance
- July 17, 2011, for the Tampa Bay Rays

MLB statistics
- Win–loss record: 8–3
- Earned run average: 3.95
- Strikeouts: 67
- Stats at Baseball Reference

Teams
- Chicago White Sox (2008); San Diego Padres (2009–2010); Tampa Bay Rays (2011)

Adam William Russell (born April 14, 1983) is an American former professional baseball pitcher. He pitched in Major League Baseball (MLB) for the Chicago White Sox, San Diego Padres, and Tampa Bay Rays.

== Amateur career ==
=== College ===
Russell was drafted by the Florida Marlins in the 26th round (782nd overall) in the 2001 Major League Baseball draft. Opting not to sign, he instead decided to play college baseball at Ohio University, where he did so for three years.

== Professional career ==
=== Chicago White Sox ===
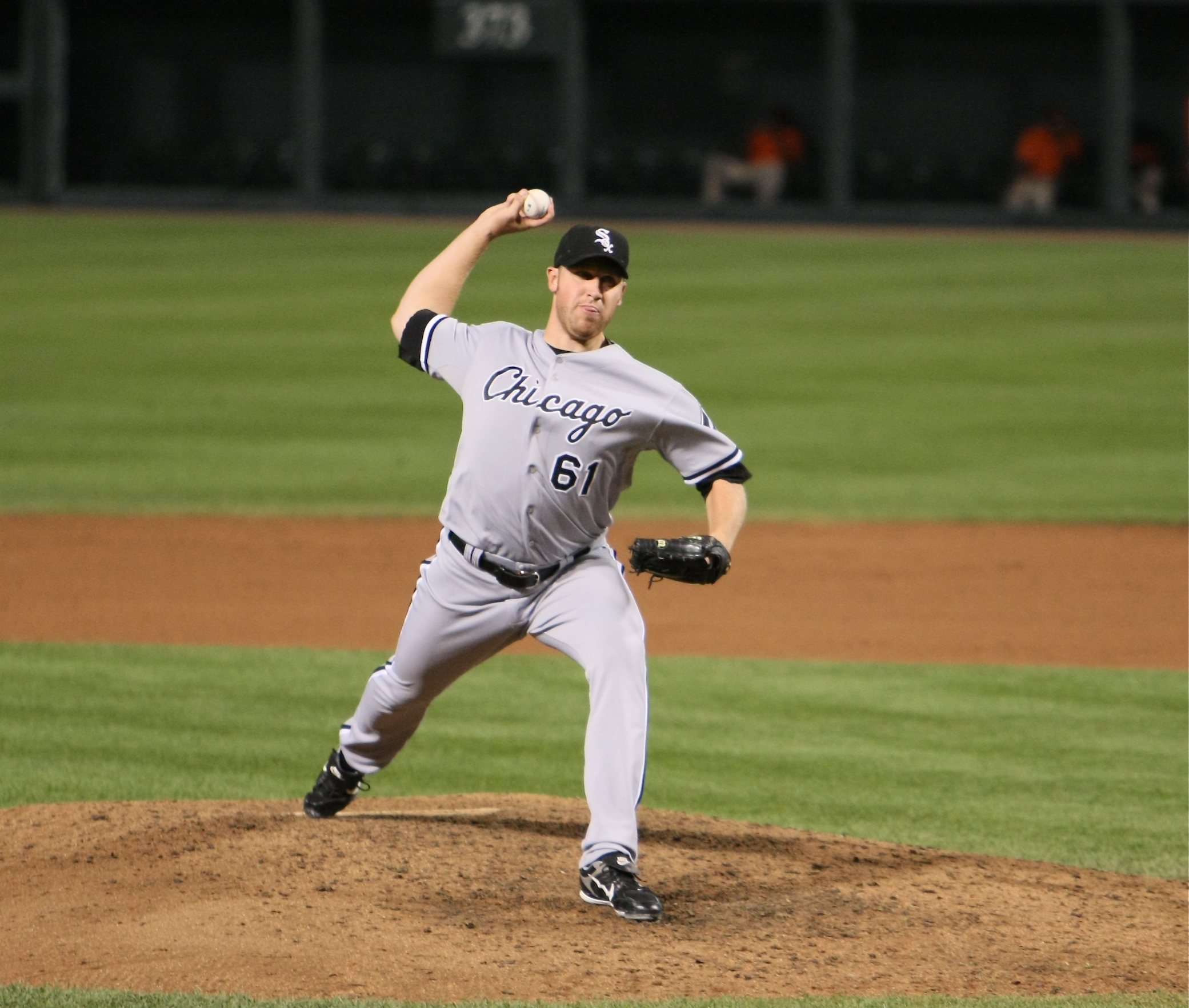
Russell pitching for the Chicago White Sox in 2008.

Russell was selected by the Chicago White Sox in the sixth round (179th overall) of the 2004 MLB draft. He made his professional debut that year, combining to go 4–2 with a 3.75 ERA in 17 appearances (six starts) between the Rookie-Level Great Falls Voyagers and Single-A Kannapolis Intimidators in 2004. Russell went 4–0 with a 2.37 ERA to earn promotion to Kannapolis on August 23. He made two starts at Kannapolis.

In 2005, Russell made 24 starts for Single-A Kannapolis, going 9–7 with a 3.78 ERA. He ranked eighth among White Sox minor leaguers in ERA and finished second on the Intimidators in victories.

Russell was rated by Baseball America as the number seven prospect and possessing the best fastball in the White Sox farm system entering the 2006 season. He was 10–6 with a 3.43 ERA in 27 starts between High-A Winston-Salem Warthogs and the Double-A Birmingham Barons. Russell ranked among the organizational leaders in starts, wins, ERA, strikeouts and innings pitched. Opponents hit .248, including a .210 mark by lefties against Russell. He began the season at Winston-Salem, going 7–3 with a 2.66 ERA in 17 starts. He was promoted to Birmingham on July 12, where he went 3–3 with a 4.75 ERA in 10 starts. He was 2–0 with a 3.65 ERA in 13 relief appearances with the Scottsdale Scorpions of the Arizona Fall League.

In 2007, Russell went 9–11 with a 4.80 ERA and one save in 38 games (20 starts) in his first full season with Double-A Birmingham. Russell began the season in the starting rotation before moving to the bullpen on July 21. He was 7–9 with a 4.61 ERA as a starter and 2–2 with a 5.60 ERA in relief. He made nine quality starts. Russell pitched for the Phoenix Desert Dogs in the Arizona Fall League, going 2–0 with a 2.81 ERA in 11 relief appearances. Russell was again rated by Baseball America as the number seven prospect and possessing the best fastball in the White Sox farm system entering the season. On November 20, 2007, Russell's contract was purchased by the White Sox, protecting him from the Rule 5 Draft.

Russell split the season between the Triple-A Charlotte Knights of the International League and the Major League White Sox in 2008. He was 4–0 with a 5.19 ERA in 22 relief appearances in his first season in the Major Leagues. The four wins came in his first 10 Major League outings and three of his four wins came at home and all against American League Central opponents. He made his Major League debut on June 17 against the Pittsburgh Pirates with one perfect inning pitched and his first strikeout against José Bautista. Russell earned his first major league win on July 1 as the White Sox defeated the Cleveland Indians 3–2 in 10 innings.

=== San Diego Padres ===
On July 31, 2009, Russell was traded to the San Diego Padres along with Aaron Poreda, Clayton Richard and Dexter Carter for Jake Peavy. In 15 games with the Padres, he went 3–1 with a 3.65 ERA in 12 1/3 innings pitched.

=== Tampa Bay Rays ===
On December 17, 2010, a deal was finalized that sent Russell, along with Cesar Ramos, Brandon Gomes and Cole Figueroa, to the Tampa Bay Rays for Jason Bartlett and a player to be named later.

Russell was designated for assignment on July 18, 2011. He cleared waivers a week later and was assigned to Triple-A on July 25.

=== Atlanta Braves ===
The Atlanta Braves signed Russell to a minor league contract on November 22, 2011. He was released on July 21, 2012.

=== Los Angeles Angels of Anaheim ===
On August 1, 2012, Russell signed with the Los Angeles Angels of Anaheim, and was assigned to the Triple-A Salt Lake Bees.

=== Baltimore Orioles ===
Russell signed a minor league contract with the Baltimore Orioles on December 5, 2012. He was assigned to the Triple-A Norfolk Tides for the 2013 season, going 3–3 with five saves and a 2.37 ERA in 42 games (three starts).

=== Arizona Diamondbacks ===
The Arizona Diamondbacks signed Russell to a minor league contract on November 29, 2013. The Diamondbacks released him on March 27, 2014.

=== Cincinnati Reds ===
Russell signed a minor league contract with the Cincinnati Reds on May 2, 2014. He made 27 appearances out of the bullpen for the Triple-A Louisville Bats, posting a 2-2 record and 4.33 ERA with 34 strikeouts and two saves across 35 1/3 innings pitched. Russell was released by the Reds organization on July 28.
