= Cesar Ramos (baseball) =

American baseball player and coach (born 1984)

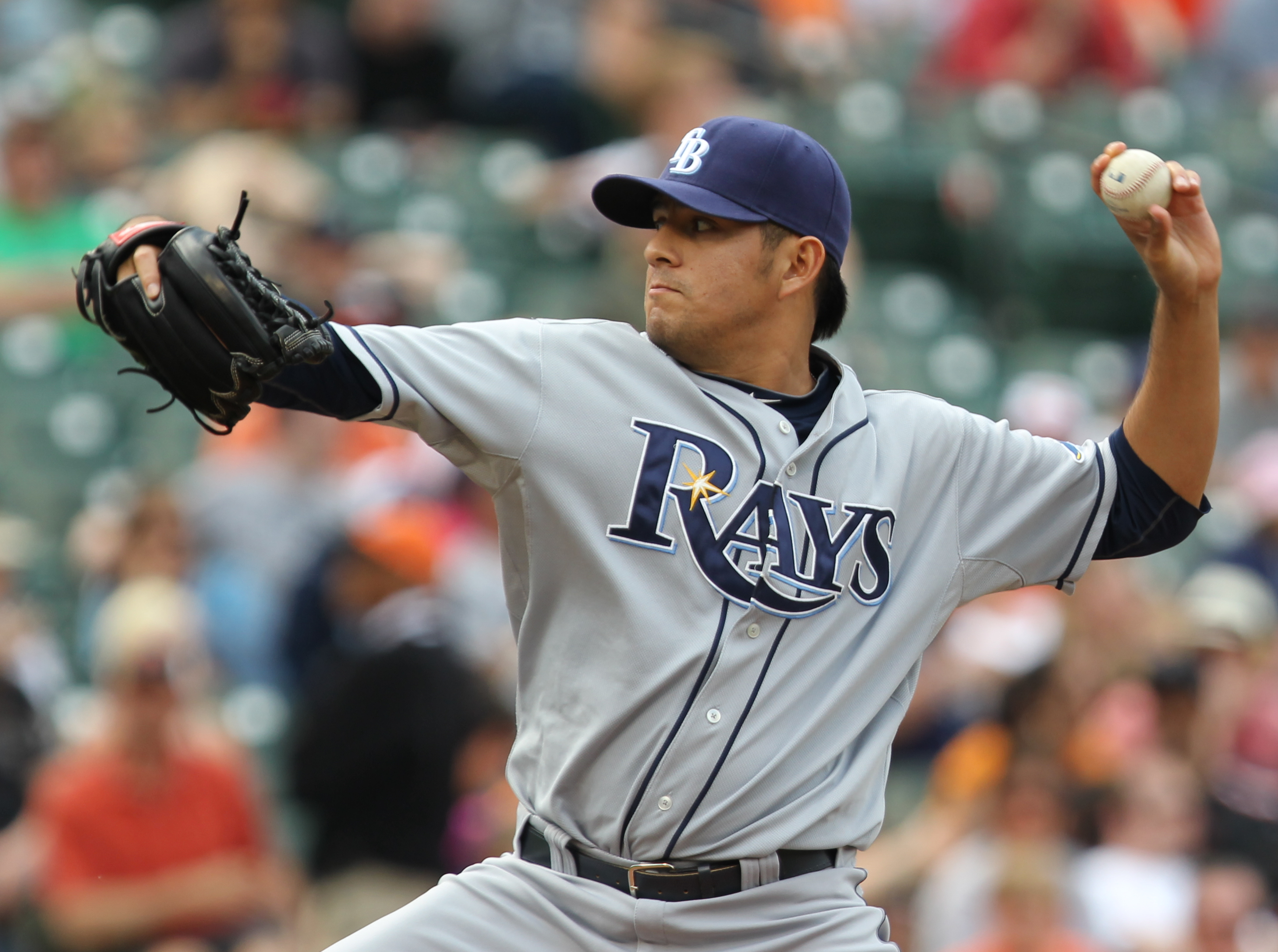
- Ramos with the Tampa Bay Rays

Philadelphia Phillies – No. 91
- Pitcher / Coach
- Born: June 22, 1984 (age 42); Los Angeles, California, U.S.
- Batted: Left Threw: Left

MLB debut
- September 16, 2009, for the San Diego Padres

Last MLB appearance
- July 10, 2016, for the Texas Rangers

MLB statistics
- Win–loss record: 10–15
- Earned run average: 4.02
- Strikeouts: 268
- Stats at Baseball Reference

Teams
- As player: San Diego Padres (2009–2010); Tampa Bay Rays (2011–2014); Los Angeles Angels of Anaheim (2015); Texas Rangers (2016); As coach: Philadelphia Phillies (2024–present)
Medals
Men's baseball
Representing United States
World University Championship
Gold medal – first place	2004 Tainan	Team

Cesar Ramos (born June 22, 1984) is an American former professional baseball pitcher and the current bullpen coach for the Philadelphia Phillies. He played in Major League Baseball (MLB) for the San Diego Padres, Tampa Bay Rays, Los Angeles Angels of Anaheim, and Texas Rangers. Before playing professionally, Ramos played college baseball at Long Beach State University.

== Amateur career ==
Ramos attended El Rancho High School. He attended Long Beach State University where he played college baseball for the Long Beach State Dirtbags baseball team, going 6–4 with a 2.85 ERA in 17 games, 14 starts, in 2003. In 2004, he went 12–4 with a 2.29 ERA in 19 starts, and in 2005 he went 10–7 with a 2.64 ERA in 18 starts.

== Professional career ==
=== San Diego Padres ===
==== Minor leagues ====
Ramos was drafted in the first round, with the 35th overall selection, in the 2005 Major League Baseball draft. He began his professional career in 2005, pitching for the Low–A Eugene Emeralds and Single–A Fort Wayne Wizards. For Eugene, he went 0–1 with a 6.53 ERA in six games, four starts. While with Fort Wayne he went 3–2 with a 4.19 ERA in seven games started.

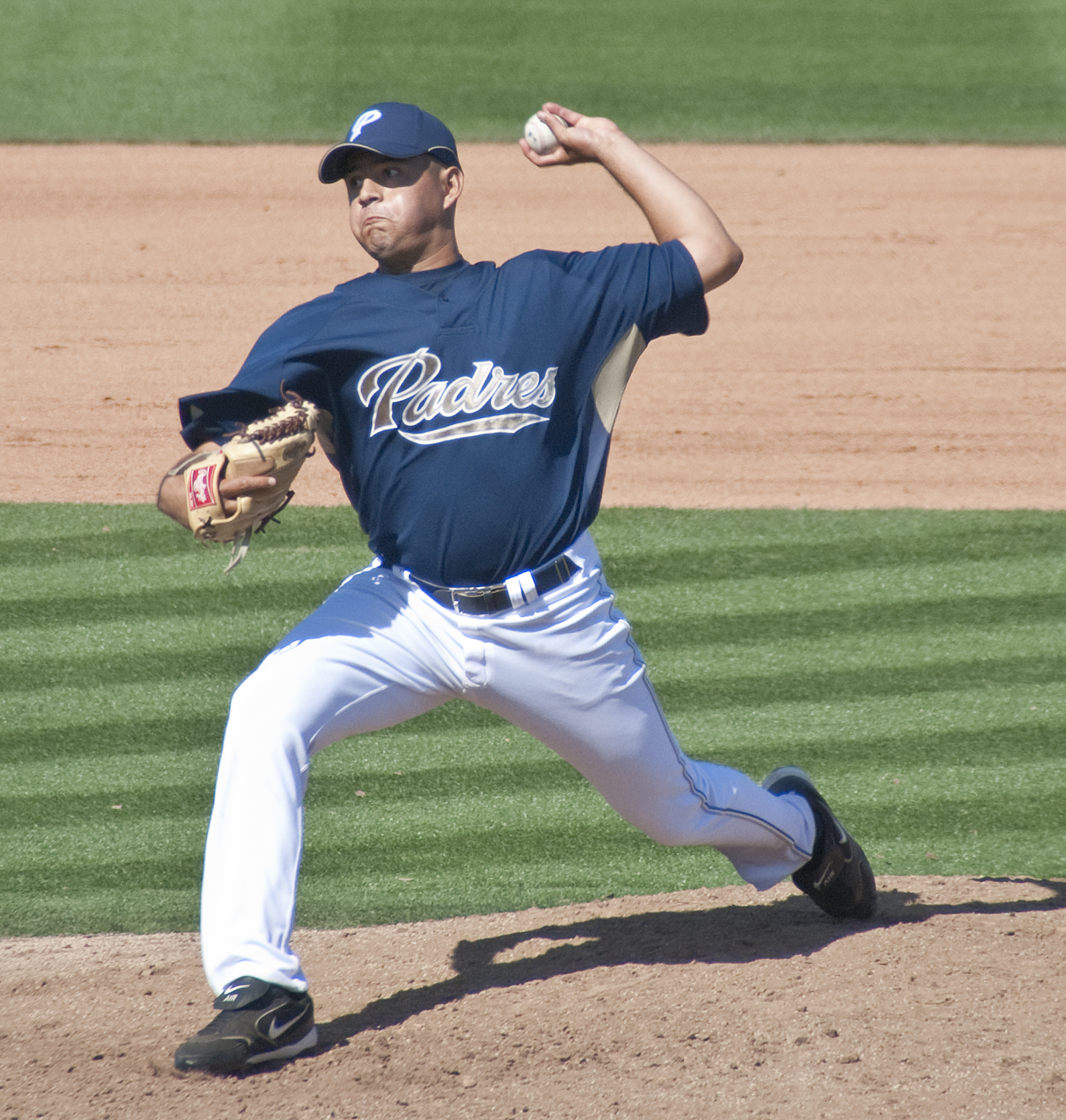
Ramos with the Padres in spring training 2009.

In 2006, Ramos pitched for the Lake Elsinore Storm, going 7–8 with a 3.64 ERA in 26 games in 24 starts. Ramos ranked second in the California League and seventh in the organization in ERA. He also led the Storm in innings pitched while rerecording eight quality starts.

Ramos was ranked by Baseball America as the tenth best prospect in the Padres organization in 2007 while going 13–9 with a 3.41 ERA for the San Antonio Missions.

He spent the entire season with the Triple-A Portland Beavers, making 27 starts and one relief appearance. He was tied for the team lead in starts with Josh Geer and also tied for the most starts for a Portland pitcher since the team returned to the Pacific Coast League in 2001 sharing the record with Junior Herndon in '01 and Dennis Tankersley in 2003. Ramos also finished tied for third in the Pacific Coast League in starts while striking out a career-high 105 batters.

==== Major leagues ====
In 2009 Ramos split time between the Arizona League Padres, the Lake Elsinore Storm, the Portland Beavers and the San Diego Padres. On September 28, 2009 the Padres announced that Ramos would be making his first Major League start against his hometown team, the Los Angeles Dodgers. Ramos allowed just one run over five innings against the Dodgers on Tuesday night, but took a no-decision in an eventual 3–1 win. He finished the '09 season 0–1 with a 3.07 ERA in five games, two starts.

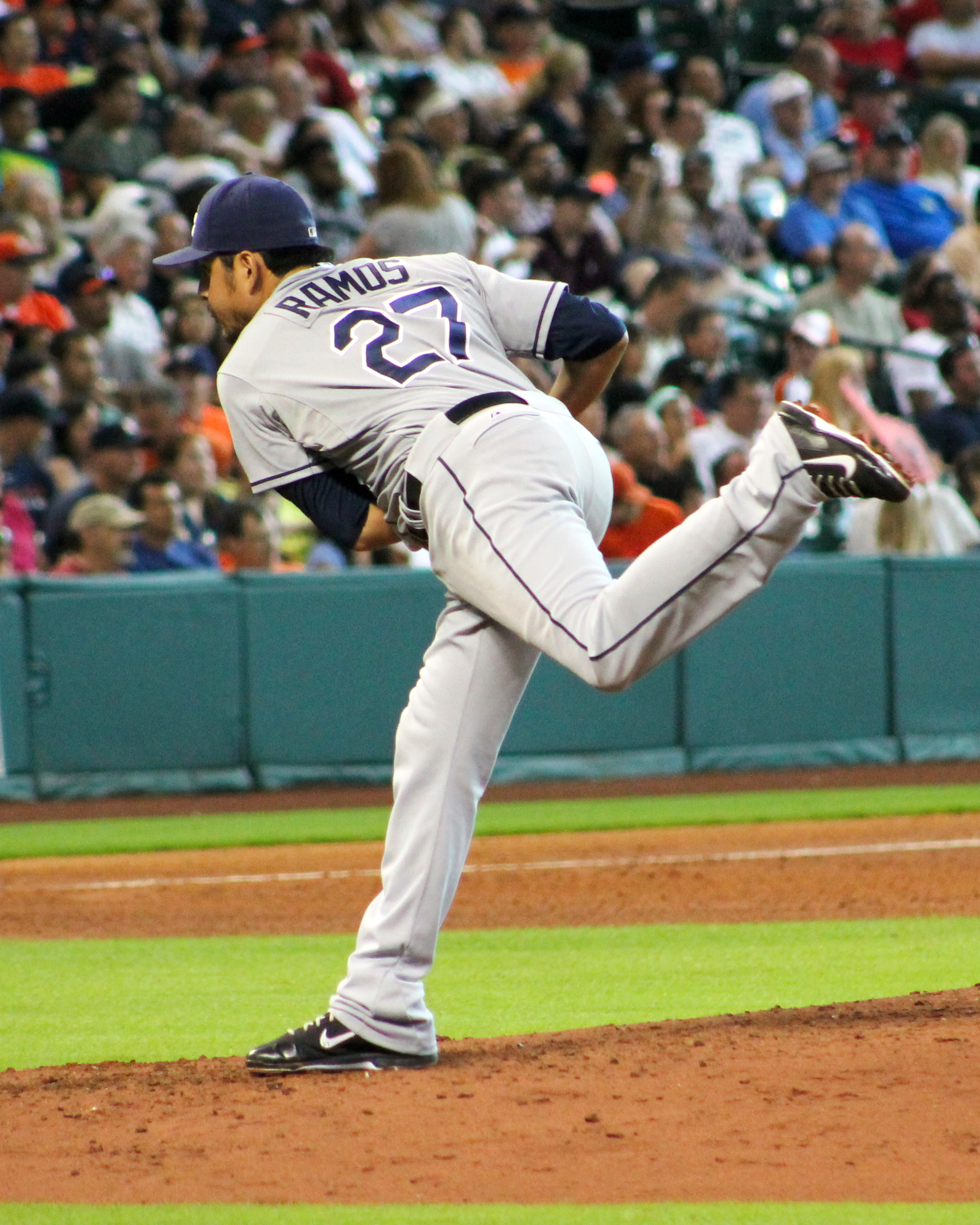
Ramos with Tampa Bay in 2014

=== Tampa Bay Rays ===
On December 17, 2010, a deal was finalized that sent Ramos, along with Adam Russell, Brandon Gomes and Cole Figueroa, to the Tampa Bay Rays for Jason Bartlett and a player to be named later. In 2011, Ramos appeared in 59 games, pitching 43 2/3 innings with a 3.92 ERA. He spent much of the next season with the Triple–A Durham Bulls, but he appeared in 17 games for Tampa Bay and registered a 2.10 ERA over 30 innings. In 2013, Ramos threw 52 innings in 48 games with a 4.14 ERA.

In April 2014, Ramos was inserted into the starting rotation in place of Alex Cobb.

=== Los Angeles Angels of Anaheim ===
The Rays traded Ramos to the Los Angeles Angels of Anaheim on November 5, 2014, for Mark Sappington. In his lone season with the Angels, Ramos appeared in 65 games out of the bullpen, going 2–1 with a 2.75 ERA, with a 7.4 K/9 and a 2.6 BB/9 in 52 1/3 innings. Ramos was non-tendered after the season by the Angels.

=== Texas Rangers ===
The Texas Rangers signed Ramos to a minor league deal on January 5, 2016. After failing to make the Rangers Opening Day roster, Ramos accepted an assignment to the Triple-A Round Rock Express. He was designated for assignment on July 22.

=== Detroit Tigers ===
On August 1, 2016, the Detroit Tigers signed Ramos to a minor league deal. In 8 games (3 starts) for the Triple–A Toledo Mud Hens, he compiled a 2–3 record and 6.00 ERA with 19 strikeouts across 21 innings pitched. Ramos elected free agency following the season on November 7.

=== Philadelphia Phillies ===
On January 5, 2017, Ramos signed a minor league contract with the Philadelphia Phillies organization. In 40 games (11 starts) for the Triple–A Lehigh Valley IronPigs, he registered a 5–4 record and 4.00 ERA with 74 strikeouts in 92 1/3 innings pitched. Ramos elected free agency following the season on November 6.

=== Los Angeles Dodgers ===
On February 16, 2018, Ramos signed a minor league contract with the Los Angeles Dodgers organization. He was released prior to the start of the season on March 30.

== Coaching career ==
Ramos was hired for the 2021 season by the Philadelphia Phillies to work with injured pitchers at their Minor League complex in Clearwater, Florida. Ramos was named the pitching coach of the Lehigh Valley IronPigs for the 2022 season. He was named the bullpen coach for the Philadelphia Phillies for the 2024 season.
