= Luis Perdomo (baseball, born 1984) =

Dominican baseball player (born 1984)

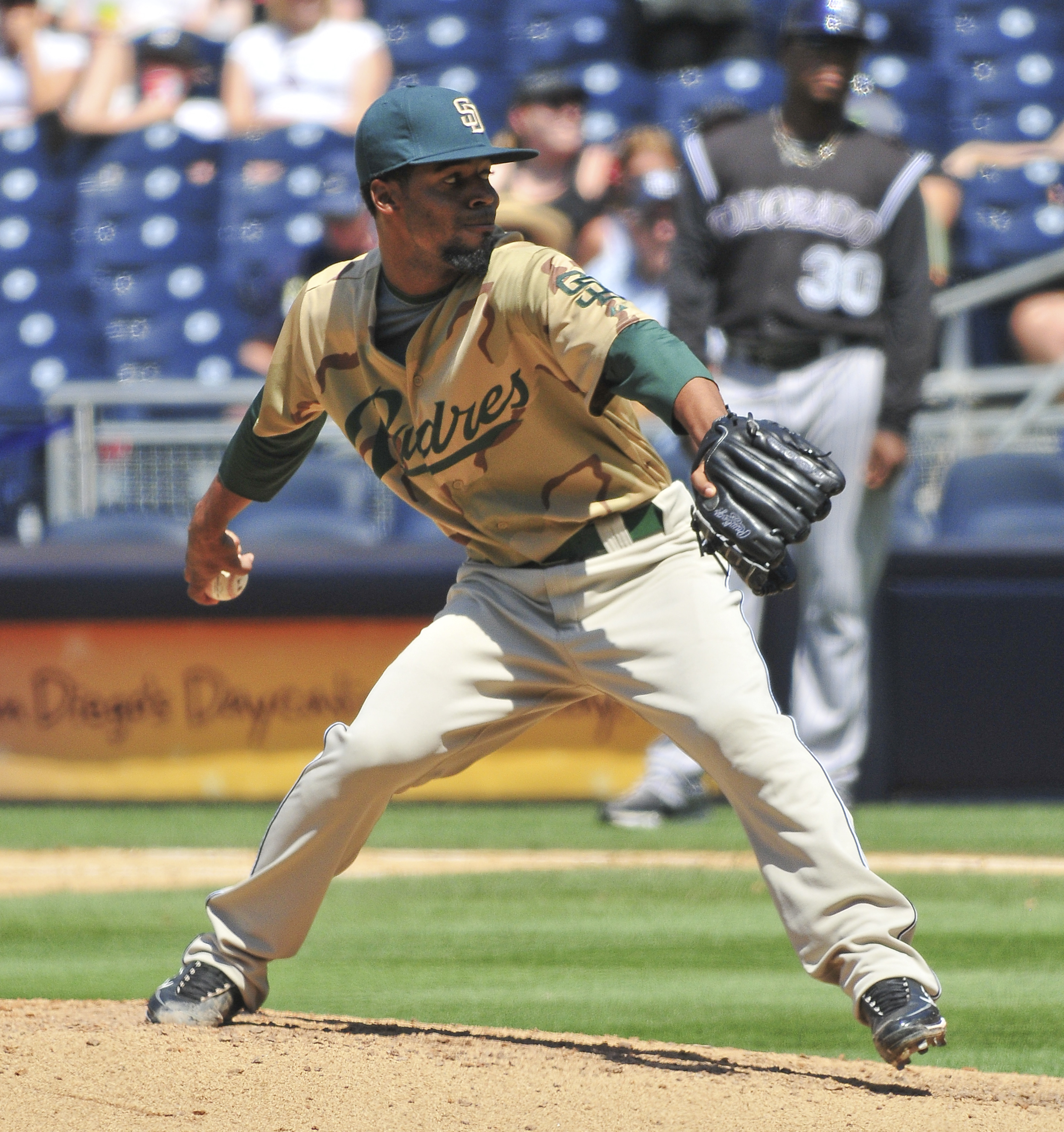
- Perdomo with the San Diego Padres in 2009.
- Pitcher
- Born: April 27, 1984 (age 42); San Cristobal, Dominican Republic
- Batted: Right Threw: Right

MLB debut
- April 15, 2009, for the San Diego Padres

Last MLB appearance
- October 3, 2012, for the Minnesota Twins

MLB statistics
- Win–loss record: 1–0
- Earned run average: 4.50
- Strikeouts: 63
- Stats at Baseball Reference

Teams
- San Diego Padres (2009–2010); Minnesota Twins (2012)

Luis M. Perdomo (nicknamed The Dominican Blur) (born April 27, 1984) is a Dominican former professional baseball pitcher. He played in Major League Baseball (MLB) for the San Diego Padres and Minnesota Twins. He is 6 feet 0 inches (1.83 m) tall and he is 170 pounds (77 kg).

== Career ==
=== Cleveland Indians ===
Originally signed by the Cleveland Indians, Perdomo played for the rookie-level Gulf Coast League Indians in 2006, going 0–2 with a 3.79 ERA in 18 relief appearances. He struck out 28 batters in 19 innings of work. In 2007, he played for the Lake County Captains, going 4–6 with a 3.27 ERA in 56 relief appearances. He had 81 strikeouts in 66 innings of work. He split the 2008 season between the Kinston Indians and Akron Aeros.

=== St. Louis Cardinals ===
He was traded to the St. Louis Cardinals organization on July 26, 2008, for Anthony Reyes and finished the season with the Springfield Cardinals. Combined, he went 7–3 with a 2.36 ERA in 55 relief appearances in 2008. He struck out 82 batters in 72 1/3 innings.

=== San Diego Padres ===
Perdomo was selected by the San Francisco Giants in the Rule 5 draft on December 11, 2008, and claimed off waivers from the Giants by the San Diego Padres on April 10, 2009. He made his major league debut for the Padres against the New York Mets on April 15. One career highlight came on May 16; during a 16-inning victory over the Reds, Perdomo pitched the final three innings. When Nick Hundley hit a walk-off home run in the bottom of the 16th, Perdomo earned his one and only MLB victory. In the 2009 season, Perdomo was mostly used in low leverage situations. He made one appearance for the Padres in 2010 on August 29, pitching one inning.

=== Minnesota Twins ===
On November 17, 2011, Perdomo signed a minor league contract with the Minnesota Twins. He had his contract purchased on July 26, 2012.

On November 20, 2012, Perdomo re-signed with the Twins organization on a minor league contract.

=== Washington Nationals ===
Perdomo signed a minor league deal with the Washington Nationals in January 2014.

=== Bridgeport Bluefish ===
Perdomo signed with the Bridgeport Bluefish of the Atlantic League of Professional Baseball for the 2015 season. He was released on July 20, 2015.

=== York Revolution ===
On July 24, 2015, Perdomo signed with the York Revolution. Perdomo re-signed with York for the 2016 season, and became a free agent after the year.
