= Edwin Moreno =

Venezuelan baseball player (born 1980)

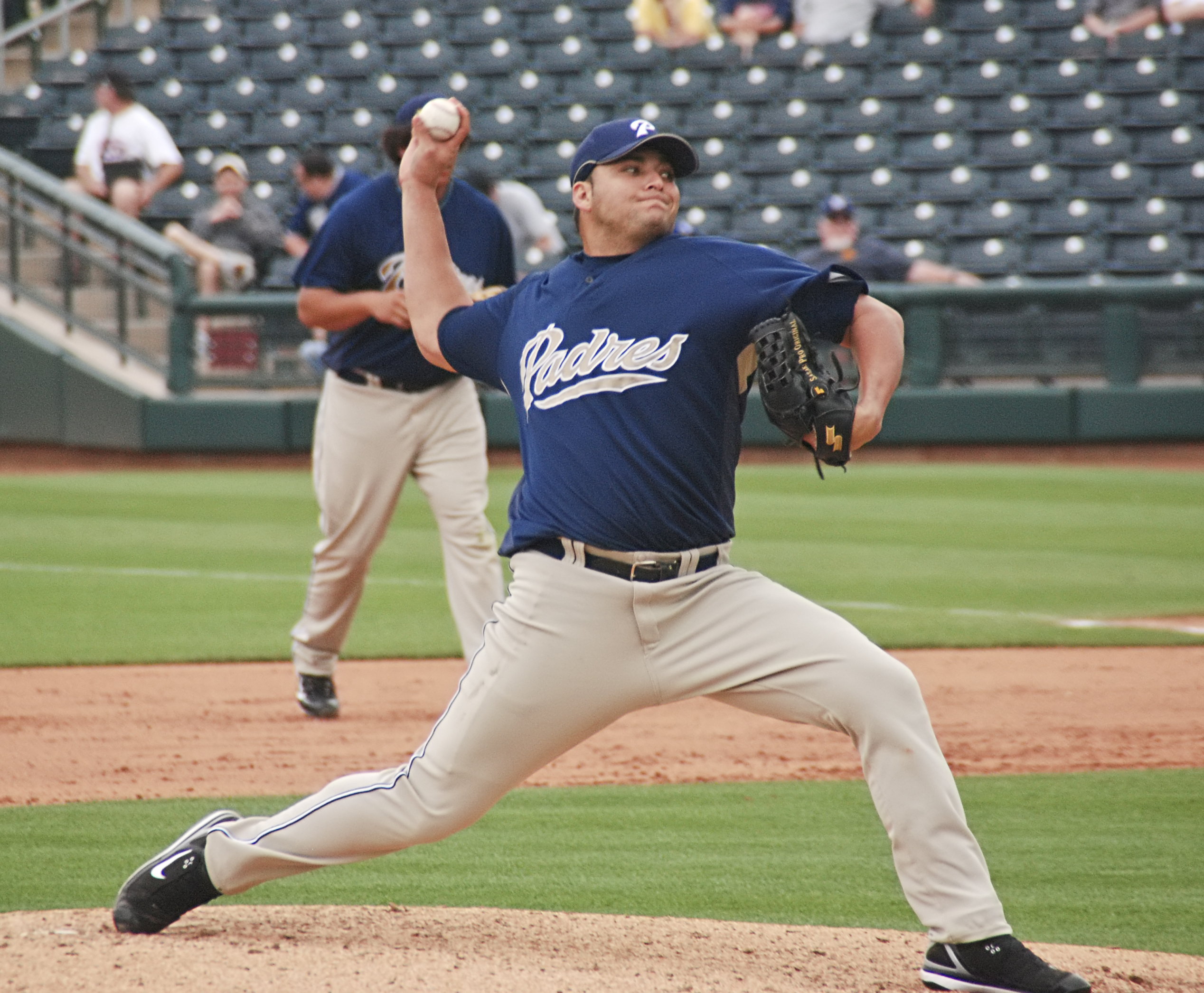
- Moreno with the San Diego Padres
- Pitcher / Coach
- Born: July 30, 1980 (age 45); San Rafael del Moján, Venezuela
- Batted: Right Threw: Right

MLB debut
- April 7, 2009, for the San Diego Padres

Last MLB appearance
- June 14, 2009, for the San Diego Padres

MLB statistics
- Win–loss record: 1–3
- Earned run average: 4.84
- Strikeouts: 15
- Stats at Baseball Reference

Teams
- San Diego Padres (2009)

Edwin A. Moreno (born July 30, 1980) is a Venezuelan former professional baseball pitcher. He played in Major League Baseball (MLB) for the San Diego Padres. He is currently the pitching coach for the Peoria Chiefs.

== Career ==
=== Texas Rangers ===
On February 13, 1998, Moreno signed with the Texas Rangers as an amateur free agent. He made his minor league debut in 2000 with the Single-A Savannah Sand Gnats. In 2001, he played for the Single-A advanced Port Charlotte Rangers. In 2002 he split time between the GCL Rangers and Port Charlotte. In 2003, Moreno played for the Double-A Frisco RoughRiders, playing in 29 games and pitching to a 3.29 ERA. Moreno played 18 games of 6.04 ERA ball for Frisco in 2004. Moreno was added to the Rangers roster after the 2004 season.

=== Philadelphia Phillies ===
On January 21, 2005, the Philadelphia Phillies claimed Moreno off waivers from the Rangers. He was assigned to the Double-A Reading Phillies for the 2005 season and pitched 20.2 innings of 4.35 ERA ball for the team. He elected free agency on October 15, 2005.

=== Petroleros de Minatitlan ===
In 2007, Moreno signed with the Petroleros de Minatitlan of the Mexican League. He played in 17 games for the Petroleros, carrying 80 strikeouts along with a 2.71 ERA over 103.0 innings pitched.

=== San Diego Padres ===
On July 1, 2007, Moreno signed with the San Diego Padres. He finished 2007 with the Double-A San Antonio Missions and pitched to an impressive 1.62 ERA over 16 games. In 2008 he appeared in 15 games for San Antonio before being promoted to the Triple-A Portland Beavers, with whom he would appear in 45 games with. In 2009, Moreno made the Opening Day roster for the Padres and made his major league debut on April 7, 2009, against the Los Angeles Dodgers. He pitched 1 inning and got one strikeout. In 2009, Moreno appeared in 19 games for the Padres, getting 15 strikeouts over 22.1 innings, and carried a 4.84 ERA. On July 5, 2009, the Padres designated Moreno for assignment. He would finish the season with Portland and elect free agency on October 6, 2009.

=== Boston Red Sox ===
On November 25, 2009, Moreno signed a minor league contract with the Boston Red Sox organization. He was released by the Red Sox before the season started on February 20, 2010.

=== Diablos Rojos del Mexico ===
On April 27, 2010, Moreno signed with the Diablos Rojos del Mexico of the Mexican League. Moreno only appeared in 4 games for the team before he became a free agent at the end of the season.

=== Second Stint with Padres ===
On October 28, 2010, Moreno signed a minor league contract with the San Diego Padres.

== Coaching career ==
=== New York Yankees ===
In 2019, Moreno was named the pitching coach for the DSL Yankees of the New York Yankees organization.

=== St. Louis Cardinals ===
In 2021, he became the pitching coach for the DSL Cardinals Blue of the St. Louis Cardinals organization. In 2022, he moved up to High-A as the pitching coach for the Peoria Chiefs.

== See also ==
- List of Major League Baseball players from Venezuela
