= Matt Daley =

American baseball player (born 1982)

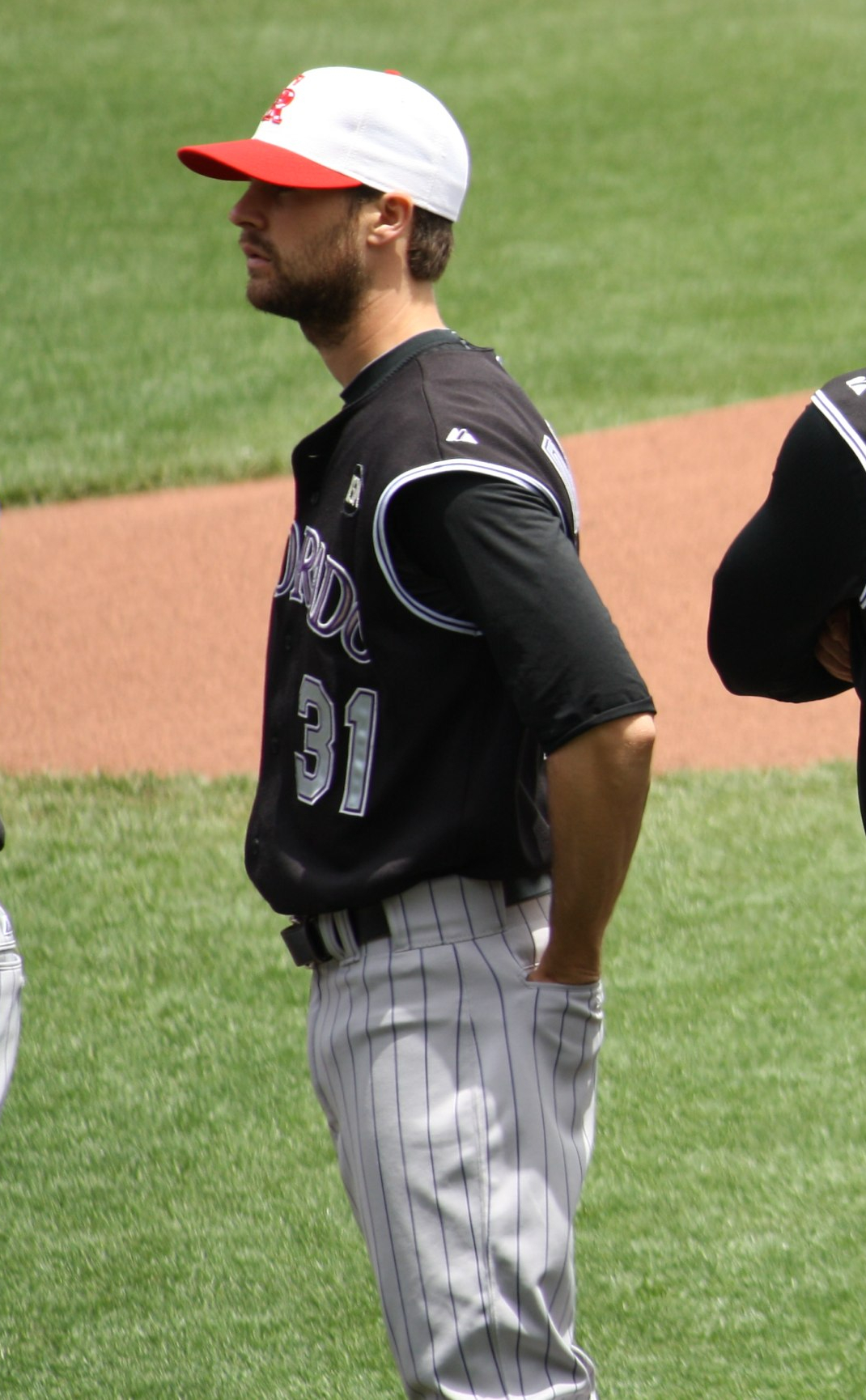
- Daley with the Colorado Rockies
- Pitcher
- Born: June 23, 1982 (age 44); Queens, New York, U.S.
- Batted: Right Threw: Right

MLB debut
- April 25, 2009, for the Colorado Rockies

Last MLB appearance
- August 5, 2014, for the New York Yankees

MLB statistics
- Win–loss record: 2–3
- Earned run average: 4.47
- Strikeouts: 98
- Stats at Baseball Reference

Teams
- Colorado Rockies (2009–2011); New York Yankees (2013–2014)

Matthew Thomas Daley (born June 23, 1982) is an American former professional baseball pitcher. He played in Major League Baseball for the Colorado Rockies and the New York Yankees from 2009 to 2014. He retired after the 2014 season and is now director of professional scouting for the New York Yankees.

== Early life ==
Daley was born in Queens, New York, and raised in Garden City, New York, where he graduated from Garden City High School in 2000 after helping GCHS win the New York State Class B baseball championship. Daley attended Bucknell University. He pitched for Bucknell's baseball team and had Tommy John surgery while in college. He was a member of Delta Upsilon. He graduated with a degree in accounting and economics.

== Baseball career ==
=== Colorado Rockies ===
Daley was signed as an amateur free agent by the Colorado Rockies on June 11, 2004. Daley made his Minor League debut in 2004 with the Casper Rockies. He spent 2005 with the Asheville Tourists, and split 2006 between the Modesto Nuts and the Tulsa Drillers. He spent the 2007 season with the Double-A Tulsa Drillers. Daley spent the 2008 season with two teams, playing for the Drillers and the Colorado Springs Sky Sox, going 4–6 in 63 games in Tulsa and Colorado Springs.

He made his major league debut on April 25, 2009, against the Los Angeles Dodgers, pitching 1 inning and getting his first strikeout. Daley went from July 8 to August 16 without letting up a single run. His 14 2/3 inning scoreless streak was the longest by a Rockies reliever in 2009.

Daley split the 2011 season between Triple-A Colorado Springs and the Rockies. He had rotator cuff surgery in August, and missed the entire 2012 season.

=== New York Yankees ===
After the 2011 season, Daley signed a minor league contract with the New York Yankees, receiving an invitation to spring training. The Yankees promoted Daley to the major leagues on September 6, 2013, and he made his first appearance with the Yankees that night. On September 26, 2013, Daley was the pitcher that replaced Mariano Rivera in Rivera's last career game. After the season, Daley was non-tendered by the Yankees, making him a free agent. He was re-signed to a minor league deal on December 19, 2013.

Daley began the 2014 season with Triple-A Scranton/Wilkes-Barre, and was promoted to the major leagues on April 19 replacing Cesar Cabral who had been designated for assignment after hitting 3 batters and being ejected in the previous night's game. Daley pitched 1.1 innings that night and had 6 runs (4 earned) scored against him. He was designated for assignment the next day, but cleared waivers and went back to Scranton. He was called back up to the major leagues in May, and optioned back to the minors on July 12. He was called up to the Yankees again on August 4, but designated for assignment four days later. The Yankees released Daley on September 2.

Daley retired at the end of the 2014 season due to shoulder issues and was hired by the Yankees as a professional scout.
