= 2009 Houston Astros season =

2009 Houston Astros
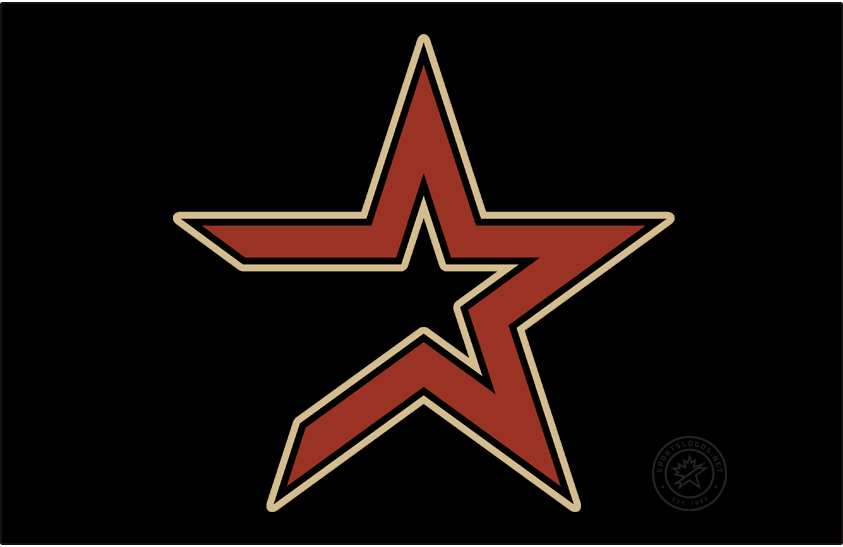
- League: National League
- Division: Central
- Ballpark: Minute Maid Park
- City: Houston, Texas
- Record: 74–88 (.457)
- Divisional place: 5th
- Owners: Drayton McLane, Jr.
- General managers: Ed Wade
- Managers: Cecil Cooper, Dave Clark (interim)
- Television: FSN Houston (Bill Brown, Jim Deshaies)
- Radio: KTRH (Milo Hamilton, Brett Dolan, Dave Raymond); KLAT (Spanish)
- Stats: ESPN.com; Baseball Reference

The 2009 Houston Astros season was the 48th season for the Major League Baseball (MLB) franchise located in Houston, Texas, their 45th as the Astros, 48th in the National League (NL), 16th in the NL Central division, and 10th at Minute Maid Park. The Astros entered the season with a 86–75 record, in third place in the NL Central division and 12 games behind the first-place Chicacgo Cubs. It was the 14th winning season out of the previous 16 for the Astros.

On April 6, pitcher Roy Oswalt made his seventh consecutive Opening Day start as the Astros hosted the Cubs, but were defeated, 4–2. In the amateur draft, the Astros selected shortstop Jio Mier in the first round at 21st overall, shortstop Enrique Hernández in the sixth round, pitcher Dallas Keuchel in the seventh round, and outfielder J. D. Martinez in the 20th round.

Two Astros players realized significant career milestones on June 13—Lance Berkman slugged his 300th home run, while Miguel Tejada collected his 2,000th hit.

Right fielder Hunter Pence and Tejada (shortstop) represented the Astros at the MLB All-Star Game and played for the National League. This was the sixth career selection for Tejada, and first for Pence. On August 15, Kazuo Matsui recorded his 2,000th hit in Nippon Professional Baseball (NPB) and MLB combined.

The Astros concluded the 2009 season with a 74–88 record, in fifth place in the NL Central, and 17 games behind the division-leading St. Louis Cardinals. This was the first of six consecutive losing seasons for Houston, through 2014. The only other occurrence in franchise history with as many consecutive losing seasons was in their first seven years in existence, from 1962 to 1968.

Center fielder Michael Bourne was awarded with his second career Gold Glove following the season. Former Astros Carlos Beltrán and Jeff Kent were selected to All-Decade Teams by Sports Illustrated and The Sporting News, respectively.

== Regular season ==
=== Summary ===
==== April ====
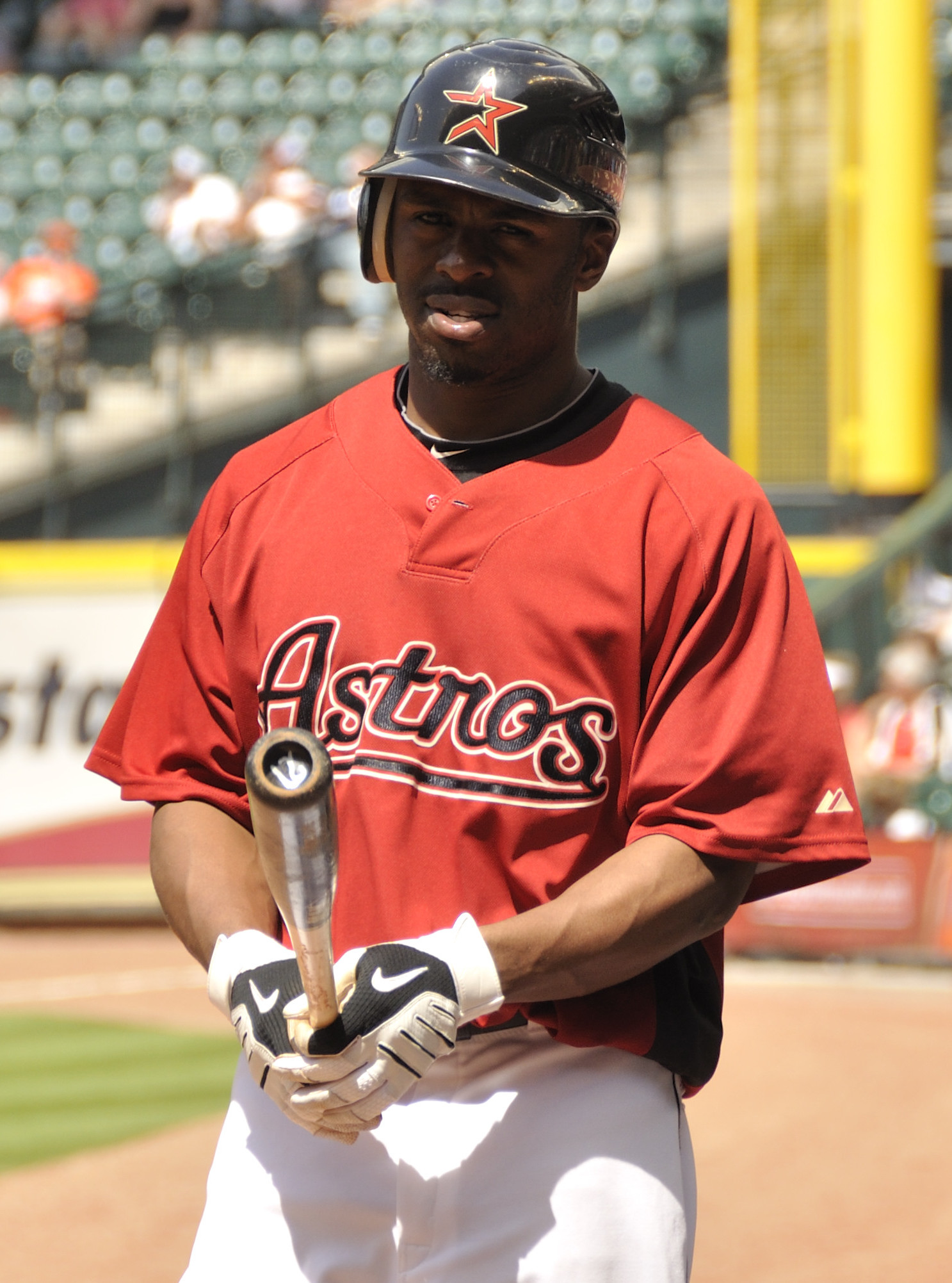
Michael Bourn, Gold Glove-winning center fielder for the Astros.

Opening Day starting lineup
| Uniform | Player | Position |
|---|---|---|
| 3 | Kazuo Matsui | Second baseman |
| 12 | Iván Rodríguez | Catcher |
| 17 | Lance Berkman | First baseman |
| 45 | Carlos Lee | Left fielder |
| 10 | Miguel Tejada | Shortstop |
| 27 | Geoff Blum | Third baseman |
| 9 | Hunter Pence | Right fielder |
| 21 | Michael Bourn | Center fielder |
| 44 | Roy Oswalt | Pitcher |
Venue: Minute Maid Park • Chidago 4, Houston 2 Sources:

The Astros hosted the Chicago Cubs for Opening Day on April 6, which ended in defeat, 4–2. Aramis Ramírez and Alfonso Soriano both homered off Astros starter Roy Oswalt, which conveyed the right-hander the defeat. Meanwhile, Cubs starter Carlos Zambrano scattered five hits and three walks over six innings to obtain the victory. Shortstop Miguel Tejada led Astros hitters with three hits and scored both runs. Oswalt extended his club-record for pitchers with his seventh Opening Day start, all fulfilled in succession.

The Astros lost their season opening series against the Chidago Cubs, their one win coming off of former Cincinnati Red Jeff Keppinger's tenth inning run batted in (RBI) single in his first at bat with the club.

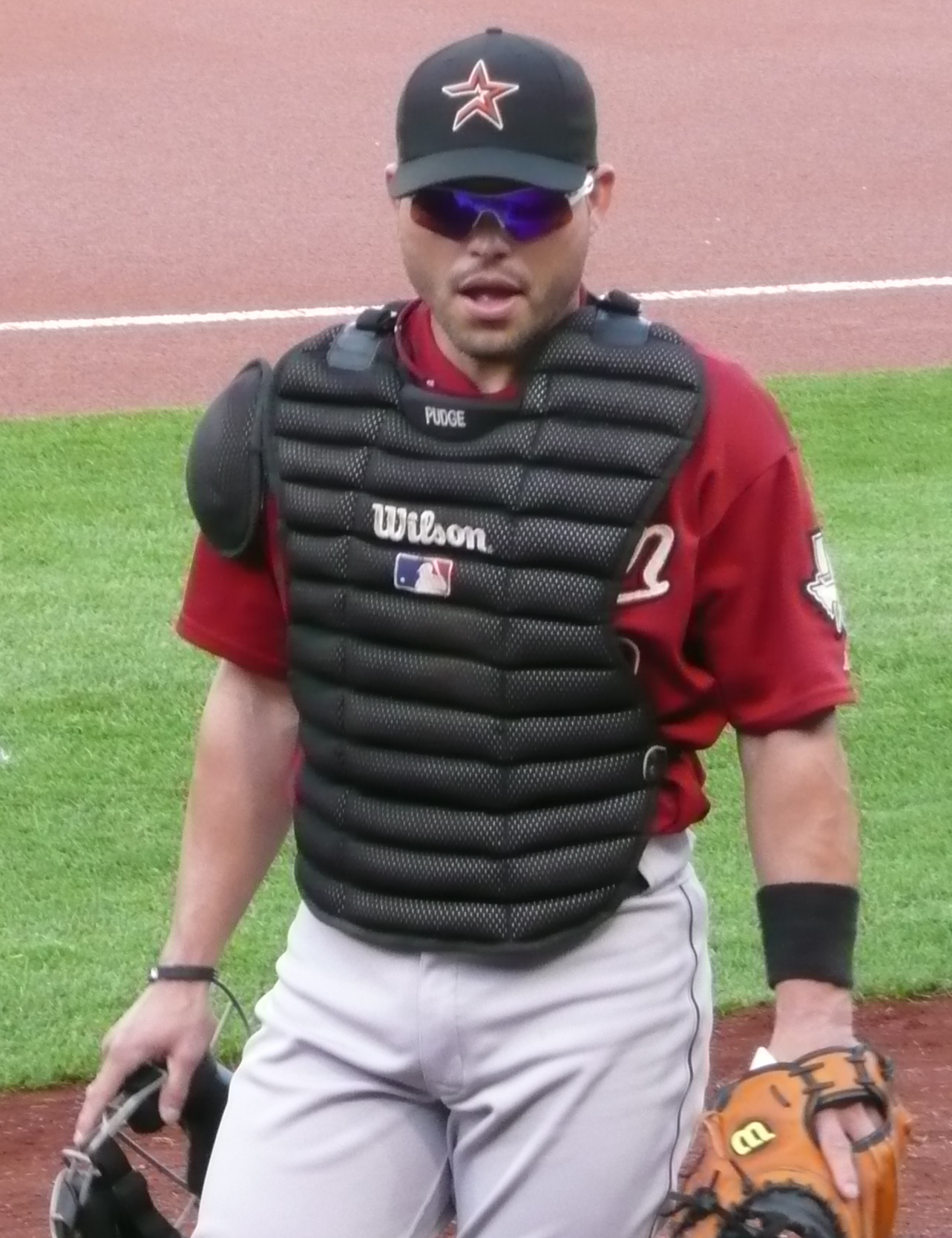
Catcher Iván Rodríguez on defense for the Astros.

They were then swept by the Cardinals in St. Louis in a three-game series, giving up 19 runs while only being able to score 5 runs. The team then traveled to Pittsburgh where they lost the first game 7-0. The next day, Mike Hampton won his second start of his second stint with the franchise with an 8 strikeout, 6 inning outing for the win over the Pirates. Lance Berkman's 6th inning 3 run home run helped the Astros win the third game of the series against the Pirates.

The Astros then returned home to Minute Maid Park, where they had three good outings against the Reds by ace Roy Oswalt, journeyman Wandy Rodríguez and Triple-A Round Rock call-up Felipe Paulino. José Valverde gave up a 2-run home run in the top of the ninth inning to Ramón Hernández for the loss in Oswalt's game on April 17, Rodriguez's got the win with a strong offensive outing by the Astros led by Geoff Blum with 3 RBIs on April 18, and Geoff Geary gave up a two-run double to Micah Owings in the top of the seventh inning for the loss in Paulino's game on April 19. In the fourth game of the series, Lance Berkman and Carlos Lee's back to back solo shot home runs were not enough to beat the Red's Edwin Encarnación's 2 RBI single and Joey Votto's 2 RBI double to give the Red's the series, 3–1. The Houston Astros are an even 451 wins and 451 losses against the Chicago Cubs.

==== May ====
Every starter collected at least two hits on May 13—including pitcher Mike Hampton—for the Astros, who routed the Colorado Rockies, 15–11. Further, Houston piled on 24 hits in all, one short of the franchise record.

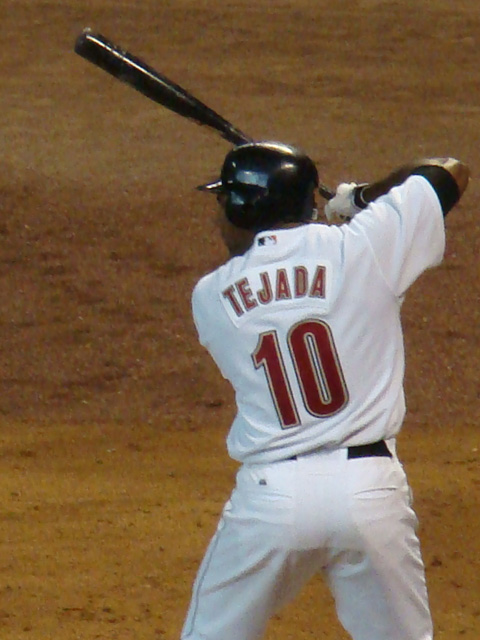
Shortstop Miguel Tejada at bat for the Astros.

From May 16 to June 3, Miguel Tejada manufactured a 17-game hitting streak, which tied for fourth-longest in the National League on the season. Tejada batted .444, .736 slugging percentage (SLG), nine doubles, four home runs, and 12 RBI. Later in the season, starting September 11, Tejada produced a longer hitting streak that reached 21 games. (Note: Longest streak of consecutive games, in 2009, playing in the NL, in the regular season, requiring hits ≥ 1, sorted by most games matching criteria.)

During the May 17 contest at Wrigley Field, Iván Rodríguez connected for his 300th career home run. It was one of the first milestones featured in a season highlighting achievement by a number of distinguished veterans on this Astros roster.

For the week ended May 24, Miguel Tejada batted .522 / .542 on-base percentage (OBP) / 1.043 SLG, 13 hits in 23 at bats, three home runs and three doubles. Tejada was selected as the NL Player of the Week.

As of May 30, Houston had a record of 19–29 (.396) for last place in the NL Central division.

==== June ====
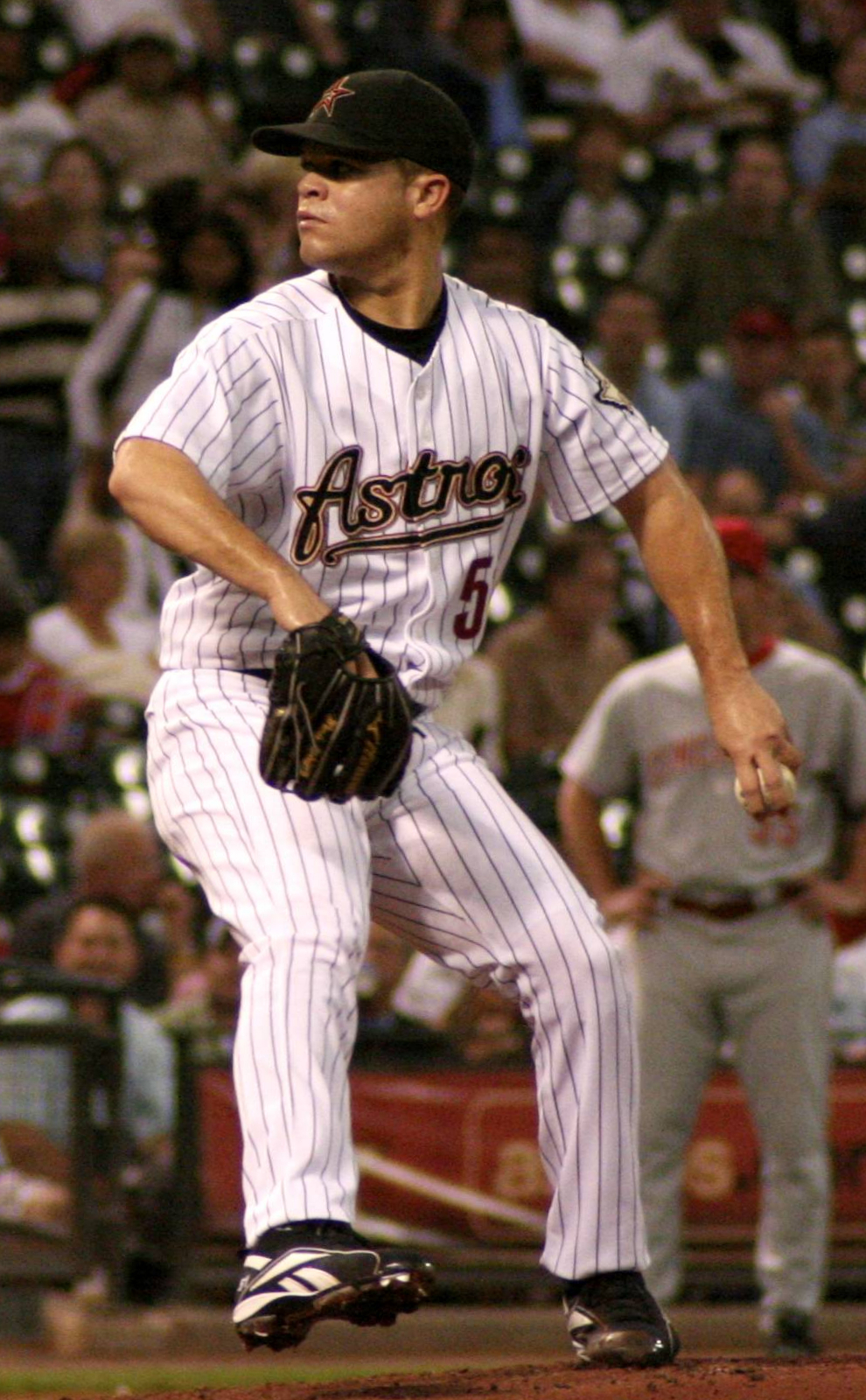
Wandy Rodríguez on the mound during the 2007 season.

On June 5, Carlos Lee slugged his 13th career grand slam Lee's 10th home run of the season, this capped a seven-run sixth inning that led to a 9–1 Astros win over the Pittsburgh Pirates. Mike Hampton (4–4) scattered five hits and one run over seven innings to obtain the victory.

Two Astros players achieved significant career milestones on June 13—Berkman conenected for his 300th home run, while Miguel Tejada collected his 2,000th hit to lead a 6–4 win over the Arizona Diamondbacks. Berkman joined Jeff Bagwell as the second Astro to have hit as many home runs with the team. Meanwhile, Tejada joined José Cruz (September 15, 1985), Craig Biggio (May 4, 2001) and Bagwell (April 26, 2003, as players to have actualized their 2,000th hit in an Astros uniform.

On June 17, Astros catcher Iván Rodríguez made his 2,227th start behind the dish against the Texas Rangers, his long-time team. This start broke the all-time record for games played at catcher. However, Rodríguez made two crucial errors that helped the Rangers to a 5–4 win.

==== July ====
On July 8, southpaw Wandy Rodríguez tossed his second career shutout, while tying his then-career high 11 strikeouts. (Note: Rodríguez would later strike out 13 batters on August 29, 2011, for his final career best.)

Following a sweep of the St. Louis Cardinals on July 22, Houston had been on a 30–27 (.526) run since the start of June which pulled the club to within a game of first place.

Over five contests during the month of July, Wandy Rodríguez posted a 4–0 win–loss record (w–l), 0.75 earned run average (ERA), 34 strikeouts, and 0.944 walks plus hits per inning pitched (WHIP). Rodríguez surrendered three earned runs, two home runs, and produced a 4.86 strikeout-to-walk ratio (K/BB). Following this effort, Rodríguez was named National League (NL) Pitcher of the Month. Rodríguez succeeded Roy Oswalt as the most recent Astros moundsman to win the award, having been recognized in September 2006.

==== August ====
Following suit of Iván Rodríguez and Lance Berkman earlier in the year, on August 8, Carlos Lee cranked the 300th home run of his career at Minute Maid Park. Hence, the Astros became the first club in major league history in which three player crossed the 300-home run threshold during the same season.

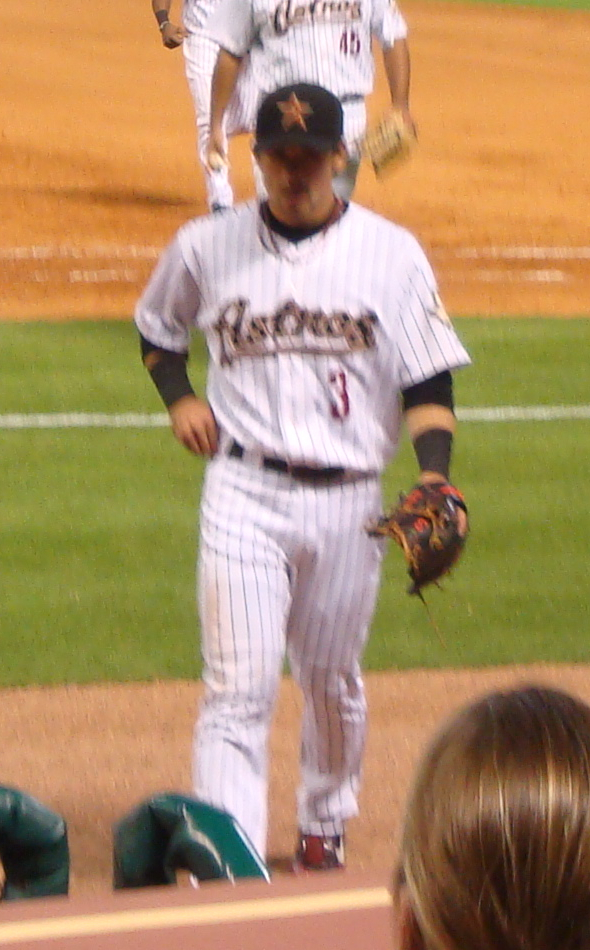
Kazuo Matsui returning from the field.

On August 15, Kazuo Matsui sprinted to record an infield single in Milwaukee for his 2,000th top-level professional hit, combined from his career in both the Pacific League in Japan along with six seasons in the National League. The event received live television coverage back home and play was halted as Japanese officials commemorated Matsui's automatic induction into the Meikyukai (Golden Players Club, an equivalent to the Baseball Hall of Fame). However, the Astros were defeated, 6-2.

==== September—October ====
Carlos Lee hit in 12 straight games commencing September 8 for third-longest on the Astros in 2009.

Starting September 11 through October 4, Miguel Tejada authored a 21-game hitting streak, tied with Derrek Lee for second-longest in the National League in 2009, trailing Ryan Zimmerman, who netted 30 consecutive. Tejada batted .407, cranked four home runs, and drove in 14 baserunners. This was the second-longest hitting streak of Tejada's career to 24 consecutive from July 11 to August 4, 2002.

==== Performance overview ====
The Astros concluded the 2009 campaign with a 74–88 (.457) record for fifth place in the NL Central, and 11 games behind the division-champion St. Louis Cardinals, a reduction of 12 wins from the year prior. This was the first of six consecutive losing seasons, an artifact not realized by the club since the inception of the expansion era in 1962 until 1968, during which they also lost 90 or more games every year. In spite of the downturn, Houston maintained their winning ways at home, reeling off a ninth straight winning chapter at Minute Maid Park, at 44–37 (.543). They concluded their first decade with a combined 456–351 (.565) showing.

In a polling of fans, Craig Biggio’s 3,000th hit on June 28, 2007, was determined the most iconic moment in Minute Maid Park history.

The 2009 stage was the final as coach for longtime former Astros outfielder José Cruz, who had served as first base coach for Houston since the 1997 season.

Miguel Tejada totaled 199 hits, which at the time, ranked as the second-highest total in club history to Craig Biggio's 210 hits in 1998. Tejada connected for a National League-leading 46 doubles, succeeding Lance Berkman as the league leader, who also hit 46 the year prior. Tejada also led the National League in double plays grounded into for the second successive campaign. Having previously led the American League (AL) thrice, the five total campaigns leading the league in this category established a Major League record.

Outfielder Michael Bourn received the Gold Glove Award, the first Astros player at the position since César Cedeño in 1976. Bourn also topped the National League with 61 stolen bases, the second Astro to do so, succeeding Biggio in 1994. With runners in scoring position, Bourn hit a robust .353.

=== League standings ===
==== National League Central ====
NL Central
| Team | W | L | Pct. | GB | Home | Road |
|---|---|---|---|---|---|---|
| St. Louis Cardinals | 91 | 71 | .562 | — | 46‍–‍35 | 45‍–‍36 |
| Chicago Cubs | 83 | 78 | .516 | 7½ | 46‍–‍34 | 37‍–‍44 |
| Milwaukee Brewers | 80 | 82 | .494 | 11 | 40‍–‍41 | 40‍–‍41 |
| Cincinnati Reds | 78 | 84 | .481 | 13 | 40‍–‍41 | 38‍–‍43 |
| Houston Astros | 74 | 88 | .457 | 17 | 44‍–‍37 | 30‍–‍51 |
| Pittsburgh Pirates | 62 | 99 | .385 | 28½ | 40‍–‍41 | 22‍–‍58 |

==== Record versus opponents ====
National League

2009 National League record Source: MLB Standings Grid – 2009
| Team | AZ | ATL | CHC | CIN | COL | FLA | HOU | LAD | MIL | NYM | PHI | PIT | SD | SF | STL | WAS | AL |
|---|---|---|---|---|---|---|---|---|---|---|---|---|---|---|---|---|---|
| Arizona | – | 3–4 | 4–2 | 1–5 | 7–11 | 5–3 | 5–4 | 7–11 | 2–5 | 5–2 | 1–5 | 6–1 | 11–7 | 5–13 | 2–4 | 1–5 | 5–10 |
| Atlanta | 4–3 | – | 4–2 | 3–6 | 4–4 | 8–10 | 3–3 | 4–3 | 3–3 | 13–5 | 10–8 | 3–4 | 3–3 | 3–4 | 4–2 | 10–8 | 7–8 |
| Chicago | 2–4 | 2–4 | – | 10–5 | 2–4 | 4–3 | 11–6 | 3–5 | 10–7 | 3–3 | 1–5 | 10–4 | 4–5 | 4–2 | 6–10 | 5–2 | 6–9 |
| Cincinnati | 5–1 | 6–3 | 5–10 | – | 0–7 | 3–3 | 12–4 | 1–5 | 8–7 | 2–4 | 2–5 | 13–5 | 1–6 | 3–3 | 8–8 | 3–4 | 6–9 |
| Colorado | 11–7 | 4–4 | 4–2 | 7–0 | – | 2–4 | 2–5 | 4–14 | 6–0 | 3–4 | 2–4 | 6–3 | 10–8 | 8–10 | 6–1 | 6–0 | 11–4 |
| Florida | 3–5 | 10–8 | 3–4 | 3–3 | 4–2 | – | 4–3 | 3–3 | 3–4 | 11–7 | 9–9 | 2–4 | 4–2 | 3–4 | 3–3 | 12–6 | 10–8 |
| Houston | 4–5 | 3–3 | 6–11 | 4–12 | 5–2 | 3–4 | – | 4–3 | 5–10 | 1–5 | 6–2 | 10–5 | 6–1 | 2–4 | 6–9 | 3–3 | 6–9 |
| Los Angeles | 11–7 | 3–4 | 5–3 | 5–1 | 14–4 | 3–3 | 3–4 | – | 3–3 | 5–1 | 4–3 | 4–3 | 10–8 | 11–7 | 2–5 | 3–2 | 9–9 |
| Milwaukee | 5–2 | 3–3 | 7–10 | 7–8 | 0–6 | 4–3 | 10–5 | 3–3 | – | 3–3 | 4–3 | 9–5 | 2–4 | 4–5 | 9–9 | 5–3 | 5–10 |
| New York | 2–5 | 5–13 | 3–3 | 4–2 | 4–3 | 7–11 | 5–1 | 1–5 | 3–3 | – | 6–12 | 4–3 | 2–5 | 5–3 | 4–5 | 10–8 | 5–10 |
| Philadelphia | 5–1 | 8–10 | 5–1 | 5–2 | 4–2 | 9–9 | 2–6 | 3–4 | 3–4 | 12–6 | – | 4–2 | 5–2 | 3–4 | 4–1 | 15–3 | 6–12 |
| Pittsburgh | 1–6 | 4–3 | 4–10 | 5–13 | 3–6 | 4–2 | 5–10 | 3–4 | 5–9 | 3–4 | 2–4 | – | 3–4 | 2–4 | 5–10 | 5–3 | 8–7 |
| San Diego | 7–11 | 3–3 | 5–4 | 6–1 | 8–10 | 2–4 | 1–6 | 8–10 | 4–2 | 5–2 | 2–5 | 4–3 | – | 10–8 | 1–6 | 4–2 | 5–10 |
| San Francisco | 13–5 | 4–3 | 2–4 | 3–3 | 10–8 | 4–3 | 4–2 | 7–11 | 5–4 | 3–5 | 4–3 | 4–2 | 8–10 | – | 4–3 | 4–2 | 9–6 |
| St. Louis | 4–2 | 2–4 | 10–6 | 8–8 | 1–6 | 3–3 | 9–6 | 5–2 | 9–9 | 5–4 | 1–4 | 10–5 | 6–1 | 3–4 | – | 6–1 | 9–6 |
| Washington | 5–1 | 8–10 | 2–5 | 4–3 | 0–6 | 6–12 | 3–3 | 2–3 | 3–5 | 8–10 | 3–15 | 3–5 | 2–4 | 2–4 | 1–6 | – | 7–11 |

=== Game log ===
2009 Game Log
April (9–13)

| # | Date | Opponent | Score | Win | Loss | Save | Attendance | Record |
|---|---|---|---|---|---|---|---|---|
| 1 | April 6 | Cubs | 4–2 | Zambrano (1–0) | Oswalt (0–1) | Gregg (1) | 43,827 | 0–1 |
| 2 | April 7 | Cubs | 3–2 (10) | Brocail (1–0) | Cotts (0–1) | | 31,121 | 1–1 |
| 3 | April 8 | Cubs | 11–6 | Lilly (1–0) | Moehler (0–1) | | 30,047 | 1–2 |
| 4 | April 10 | @ Cardinals | 5–3 | Piñeiro (1–0) | Hampton (0–1) | McClellan (1) | 37,224 | 1–3 |
| 5 | April 11 | @ Cardinals | 11–2 | Wainwright (1–0) | Oswalt (0–2) | | 43,454 | 1–4 |
| 6 | April 12 | @ Cardinals | 3–0 | Lohse (2–0) | Rodríguez (0–1) | | 36,310 | 1–5 |
| 7 | April 13 | @ Pirates | 7–0 | Duke (2–0) | Moehler (0–2) | | 38,411 | 1–6 |
| 8 | April 15 | @ Pirates | 4–1 | Hampton (1–1) | Ohlendorf (0–2) | | 20,690 | 2–6 |
| 9 | April 16 | @ Pirates | 6–3 | Wright (1–0) | Burnett (0–1) | Hawkins (1) | 13,877 | 3–6 |
| 10 | April 17 | Reds | 2–1 | Masset (1–0) | Valverde (0–1) | Cordero (3) | 32,268 | 3–7 |
| 11 | April 18 | Reds | 7–0 | Rodríguez (1–1) | Harang (1–2) | | 30,141 | 4–7 |
| 12 | April 19 | Reds | 4–2 | Vólquez (2–1) | Geary (0–1) | Cordero (4) | 29,372 | 4–8 |
| 13 | April 20 | Reds | 4–3 | Arroyo (3–0) | Geary (0–2) | Cordero (5) | 23,308 | 4–9 |
| 14 | April 21 | Dodgers | 8–5 | Ortiz (1–0) | Kershaw (0–1) | Valverde (1) | 26,360 | 5–9 |
| 15 | April 22 | Dodgers | 6–5 | Sampson (1–0) | Belisario (0–1) | Hawkins (2) | 26,725 | 6–9 |
| 16 | April 23 | Dodgers | 2–0 | Billingsley (4–0) | Rodríguez (1–2) | Broxton (5) | 26,081 | 6–10 |
| 17 | April 24 | Brewers | 5–2 | Gallardo (2–1) | Paulino (0–1) | | 25,316 | 6–11 |
| 18 | April 25 | Brewers | 9–8 (11) | DiFelice (1–0) | Geary (0–3) | | 31,355 | 6–12 |
| 19 | April 26 | Brewers | 3–2 | Ortiz (2–0) | Parra (0–4) | Valverde (2) | 27,690 | 7–12 |
| 20 | April 27 | @ Reds | 4–1 | Sampson (2–0) | Cordero (0–1) | | 12,365 | 8–12 |
| 21 | April 28 | @ Reds | 8–3 | Rodríguez (2–2) | Harang (2–3) | | 9,878 | 9–12 |
| 22 | April 29 | @ Reds | 3–0 | Vólquez (3–2) | Paulino (0–2) | Cordero (7) | 12,681 | 9–13 |

May (11–16)

| # | Date | Opponent | Score | Win | Loss | Save | Attendance | Record |
|---|---|---|---|---|---|---|---|---|
| 23 | May 1 | @ Braves | 7–2 | Lowe (3–1) | Hampton (1–2) | | 29,309 | 9–14 |
| 24 | May 2 | @ Braves | 5–1 | Byrdak (1–0) | Carlyle (0–1) | | 28,203 | 10–14 |
| 25 | May 3 | @ Braves | 7–5 | Geary (1–3) | Moylan (1–2) | Hawkins (3) | 27,921 | 11–14 |
| 26 | May 4 | @ Nationals | 9–4 | Lannan (1–3) | Wright (1–1) | | 14,115 | 11–15 |
| 27 | May 5* | @ Nationals | 11–10 | Hanrahan (1–1) | Hawkins (0–1) (1–1) | | 19,328 | 11–16 |
| 28 | May 6 | Cubs | 6–3 | Harden (3–1) | Hampton (1–3) | Gregg (5) | 29,415 | 11–17 |
| 29 | May 7 | Cubs | 8–5 | Lilly (4–2) | Ortiz (2–1) | | 28,625 | 11–18 |
| 30 | May 8 | Padres | 2–0 | Rodríguez (3–2) | Gaudin (0–2) | Hawkins (4) | 28,139 | 12–18 |
| 31 | May 9 | Padres | 5–4 | Hawkins (1–0) | Gregerson (0–3) | | 29,141 | 13–18 |
| 32 | May 10 | Padres | 12–5 | Oswalt (1–2) | Geer (0–1) | | 30,023 | 14–18 |
| 33 | May 12 | @ Rockies | 12–1 | Jiménez (3–4) | Paulino (0–3) | | 23,233 | 14–19 |
| 34 | May 13 | @ Rockies | 15–11 | Hampton (2–3) | Marquis (4–3) | | 19,226 | 15–19 |
| 35 | May 14 | @ Rockies | 5–3 | Rodríguez (4–2) | Hammel (0–2) | Hawkins (5) | 22,696 | 16–19 |
| | May 15 | @ Cubs | Postponed | | | | | |
| 36 | May 16 | @ Cubs | 5–4 | Marshall (2–2) | Hawkins (1–1) | | 40,549 | 16–20 |
| 37 | May 17 | @ Cubs | 6–5 | Moehler (1–2) | Harden (4–2) | Sampson (1) | 40,478 | 17–20 |
| 38 | May 19 | Brewers | 4–2 | Bush (3–0) | Ortiz (2–2) | Hoffman (10) | 29,343 | 17–21 |
| 39 | May 20 | Brewers | 6–4 | Rodríguez (5–2) | Gallardo (4–2) | Sampson (2) | 27,160 | 18–21 |
| 40 | May 21 | Brewers | 4–3 | McClung (1–1) | Fulchino (0–1) | Hoffman (11) | 25,037 | 18–22 |
| 41 | May 22 | Rangers | 6–5 (10) | O'Day (2–0) | Hawkins (1–2) | Francisco (10) | 36,017 | 18–23 |
| 42 | May 23 | Rangers | 6–3 | Feldman (3–0) | Moehler (1–3) | Wilson (3) | 36,019 | 18–24 |
| 43 | May 24 | Rangers | 5–0 | McCarthy (4–2) | Hampton (2–4) | | 36,749 | 18–25 |
| 44 | May 25 | @ Reds | 8–5 | Harang (5–4) | Rodríguez (5–3) | Cordero (12) | 17,818 | 18–26 |
| 45 | May 26 | @ Reds | 6–4 | Masset (2–0) | Byrdak (1–1) | Cordero (13) | 15,619 | 18–27 |
| 46 | May 27 | @ Reds | 6–1 | Arroyo (7–3) | Paulino (0–4) | | 17,602 | 18–28 |
| 47 | May 29 | @ Pirates | 6–1 | Moehler (2–3) | Ohlendorf (5–5) | | 18,236 | 19–28 |
| 48 | May 30 | @ Pirates | 7–4 | Karstens (2–2) | Rodríguez (5–4) | Capps (10) | 37,167 | 19–29 |
| 49 | May 31 | @ Pirates | 2–1 | Hampton (3–4) | Maholm (3–2) | Hawkins (6) | 19,566 | 20–29 |
*Game suspended, completed on July 9 at Minute Maid Park.

June (16–11)

| # | Date | Opponent | Score | Win | Loss | Save | Attendance | Record |
|---|---|---|---|---|---|---|---|---|
| 50 | June 1 | Rockies | 4–1 | Oswalt (2–2) | Cook (3–3) | Hawkins (7) | 24,016 | 21–29 |
| 51 | June 2 | Rockies | 3–2 (11) | Ortiz (3–2) | Fogg (0–1) | | 24,041 | 22–29 |
| 52 | June 3 | Rockies | 6–4 | Byrdak (2–1) | Marquis (7–4) | Sampson (3) | 22,032 | 23–29 |
| 53 | June 4 | Rockies | 10–3 | Hammel (2–3) | Rodríguez (5–5) | | 26,671 | 23–30 |
| 54 | June 5 | Pirates | 9–1 | Hampton (4–4) | Karstens (2–3) | | 26,222 | 24–30 |
| 55 | June 6 | Pirates | 6–4 | Maholm (4–2) | Oswalt (2–3) | Capps (13) | 26,099 | 24–31 |
| 56 | June 7 | Pirates | 6–4 | Fulchino (1–1) | Jackson (1–1) | Hawkins (8) | 25,729 | 25–31 |
| 57 | June 9 | Cubs | 7–1 | Lilly (7–4) | Moehler (2–4) | | 29,669 | 25–32 |
| 58 | June 10 | Cubs | 2–1 | Sampson (3–0) | Guzmán (2–1) | | 29,840 | 26–32 |
| 59 | June 11 | Cubs | 2–1 (13) | Fulchino (2–1) | Ascanio (0–1) | | 34,250 | 27–32 |
| 60 | June 12 | @ Diamondbacks | 8–1 | Haren (5–4) | Hampton (4–5) | | 22,225 | 27–33 |
| 61 | June 13 | @ Diamondbacks | 6–4 | Oswalt (3–3) | Garland (4–7) | Hawkins (9) | 29,206 | 28–33 |
| 62 | June 14 | @ Diamondbacks | 8–3 | Moehler (3–4) | Buckner (2–3) | | 26,937 | 29–33 |
| 63 | June 16 | @ Rangers | 6–1 | Millwood (7–4) | Rodríguez (5–6) | | 21,676 | 29–34 |
| 64 | June 17 | @ Rangers | 5–4 (10) | Wilson (4–3) | Fulchino (2–2) | | 32,425 | 29–35 |
| 65 | June 18 | @ Rangers | 5–3 | Arias (1–0) | Jennings (2–2) | Valverde (3) | 25,445 | 30–35 |
| 66 | June 19 | @ Twins | 5–2 | Slowey (10–2) | Oswalt (3–4) | Nathan (16) | 32,218 | 30–36 |
| 67 | June 20 | @ Twins | 6–5 | Moehler (4–3) | Henn (0–3) | Valverde (4) | 34,710 | 31–36 |
| 68 | June 21 | @ Twins | 4–1 | Rodríguez (6–6) | Perkins (2–4) | Valverde (5) | 39,659 | 32–36 |
| 69 | June 23 | Royals | 2–1 | Greinke (9–3) | Ortiz (3–3) | Soria (8) | 30,049 | 32–37 |
| 70 | June 24 | Royals | 4–3 | Soria (2–0) | Fulchino (2–3) | Bale (1) | 28,602 | 32–38 |
| 71 | June 25 | Royals | 5–4 | Wright (2–1) | Bannister (5–5) | Valverde (6) | 32,048 | 33–38 |
| 72 | June 26 | Tigers | 5–4 | Sampson (4–0) | Zumaya (3–2) | Hawkins (10) | 33,052 | 34–38 |
| 73 | June 27 | Tigers | 8–1 | Paulino (2–4) | Figaro (1–1) | | 37,123 | 35–38 |
| 74 | June 28 | Tigers | 4–3 | Seay (1–1) | Valverde (0–2) | Rodney (17) | 34,041 | 35–39 |
| 75 | June 29 | @ Padres | 3–1 | Oswalt (4–4) | Geer (1–3) | | 15,671 | 36–39 |
| 76 | June 30 | @ Padres | 4–3 | Banks (1–0) | Sampson (4–1) | Bell (22) | 15,276 | 36–40 |

July (15–12)

| # | Date | Opponent | Score | Win | Loss | Save | Attendance | Record |
|---|---|---|---|---|---|---|---|---|
| 77 | July 1 | @ Padres | 7–1 | Moehler (5–4) | Silva ((0–2) | | 16,670 | 37–40 |
| 78 | July 2 | @ Padres | 7–2 | Rodríguez (7–6) | Correia (5–6) | | 23,284 | 38–40 |
| 79 | July 3 | @ Giants | 13–0 | Sadowski (2–0) | Paulino (2–5) | | 42,199 | 38–41 |
| 80 | July 4 | @ Giants | 9–0 | Lincecum (9–2) | Ortiz (3–4) | | 34,582 | 38–42 |
| 81 | July 5 | @ Giants | 7–1 | Oswalt (5–4) | Johnson (8–6) | | 30,157 | 39–42 |
| 82 | July 6 | Pirates | 4–1 | Hampton (5–5) | Vasquez (1–2) | Valverde (7) | 26,834 | 40–42 |
| 83 | July 7 | Pirates | 6–3 | Maholm (6–4) | Moehler (5–5) | Capps (13) | 27,142 | 40–43 |
| 84 | July 8 | Pirates | 5–0 | Rodríguez (8–6) | Morton (1–2) | | 29,243 | 41–43 |
| 85 | July 9 | Nationals | 9–4 | Arias (2–0) | Lannan (6–6) | | 25,490 | 42–43 |
| 86 | July 10 | Nationals | 6–5 | Fulchino (3–3) | Beimel (0–5) | | 33,085 | 43–43 |
| 87 | July 11 | Nationals | 13–2 | Stammen (2–4) | Hampton (5–6) | | 30,052 | 43–44 |
| 88 | July 12 | Nationals | 5–0 | Moehler (6–5) | Zimmermann (3–4) | Valverde (8) | 28,680 | 44–44 |
| 89 | July 16 | @ Dodgers | 3–0 | Rodríguez (9–6) | Wolf (4–4) | Valverde (9) | 45,970 | 45–44 |
| 90 | July 17 | @ Dodgers | 8–1 | Oswalt (6–4) | Chad Billingsley (9–5) | | 51,209 | 46–44 |
| 91 | July 18 | @ Dodgers | 5–2 | Kershaw (8–5) | Hampton | Broxton (21) | 48,298 | 46–45 |
| 92 | July 19 | @ Dodgers | 4–3 | Troncoso (4–0) | Hawkins (1–4) | Broxton (22) | 40,340 | 46–46 |
| 93 | July 20 | Cardinals | 3–2 | Moehler (7–5) | Lohse (4–6) | Valverde (10) | 36,437 | 47–46 |
| 94 | July 21 | Cardinals | 11–6 | Rodríguez (10–6) | Wellemeyer (7–8) | | 33,140 | 48–46 |
| 95 | July 22 | Cardinals | 4–3 | Valverde (1–2) | Franklin (2–1) | | 37,619 | 49–46 |
| 96 | July 24 | Mets | 5–4 | Hampton (6–7) | Santana (11–8) | Valverde (11) | 42,967 | 50–46 |
| 97 | July 25 | Mets | 10–3 | Niese (1–0) | Ortiz (3–5) | | 43,302 | 50–47 |
| 98 | July 26 | Mets | 8–3 | Hernández (7–5) | Moehler (7–6) | Green (1) | 34,642 | 50–48 |
| 99 | July 27 | @ Cubs | 5–1 (13) | Samardzija (1–1) | Sampson (4–2) | | 40,794 | 50–49 |
| 100 | July 28 | @ Cubs | 11–6 | Fulchino | Guzmán | | 40,814 | 51–49 |
| 101 | July 29 | @ Cubs | 12–0 | Wells (7–4) | Hampton (6–8) | | 41,538 | 51–50 |
| 102 | July 30 | @ Cubs | 12–3 | Hart (3–1) | Ortiz (3–6) | | 41,524 | 51–51 |
| 103 | July 31 | @ Cardinals | 4–3 | Miller (3–0) | Arias (2–1) | Franklin | 43,760 | 51–52 |

August (13–18)

| # | Date | Opponent | Score | Win | Loss | Save | Attendance | Record |
|---|---|---|---|---|---|---|---|---|
| 104 | August 1 | @ Cardinals | 3–1 | Carpenter (10–3) | Fulchino (4–4) | | 45,074 | 51–53 |
| 105 | August 2 | @ Cardinals | 2–0 | Norris (1–0) | Wainwright | Valverde (12) | 45,227 | 52–53 |
| 106 | August 3 | Giants | 4–3 | Hampton (7–8) | Cain (12–3) | Valverde (13) | 29,835 | 53–53 |
| 107 | August 4 | Giants | 8–1 | Sánchez (5–9) | Paulino (2–6) | | 29,747 | 53–54 |
| 108 | August 5 | Giants | 10–6 | Martinez (2–0) | Moehler (7–7) | | 31,710 | 53–55 |
| 109 | August 7 | Brewers | 6–3 | Norris (2–0) | Carlos Villanueva (2–9) | | 34,691 | 54–55 |
| 110 | August 8 | Brewers | 12–5 | Manny Parra (7–8) | Hampton (7–9) | | 35,216 | 54–56 |
| 111 | August 9 | Brewers | 2–0 | Rodríguez (11–6) | Gallardo (10–9) | Valverde (15) | 32,262 | 55–56 |
| 112 | August 10 | @ Marlins | 8–6 | VandenHurk (2–1) | Moehler (7–8) | Núñez (12) | 12,325 | 55–57 |
| 113 | August 11 | @ Marlins | 9–8 (11) | Sanchez (3–1) | Wright (2–2) | | 13,312 | 55–58 |
| 114 | August 12 | @ Marlins | 14–6 | Norris (3–0) | Nolasco (8–8) | | 21,122 | 56–58 |
| 115 | August 13 | @ Marlins | 9–2 | West (4–4) | Hampton (7–10) | | 14,047 | 56–59 |
| 116 | August 14 | @ Brewers | 11–2 | Gallardo (11–9) | Rodríguez (11–7) | | 37,715 | 56–60 |
| 117 | August 15 | @ Brewers | 6–2 | Burns (3–4) | Moehler (7–9) | | 42,952 | 56–61 |
| 118 | August 16 | @ Brewers | 8–5 | Fulchino (5–4) | Weathers (3–4) | Valverde (16) | 41,863 | 57–61 |
| 119 | August 18 | Marlins | 6–2 | Nolasco (9–8) | Norris (3–1) | | 30,189 | 57–62 |
| 120 | August 19 | Marlins | 6–3 | Gervacio (1–0) | West (4–5) | Valverde (17) | 30,101 | 58–62 |
| 121 | August 20 | Marlins | 4–1 | Rodríguez (12–7) | Johnson (12–3) | Valverde (18) | 30,039 | 59–62 |
| 122 | August 21 | Diamondbacks | 1–0 | Oswalt (7–4) | Petit (2–8) | Valverde (19) | 30,032 | 60–62 |
| 123 | August 22 | Diamondbacks | 4–2 | Moehler (8–9) | Scherzer (7–8) | Hawkins | 39,412 | 61–62 |
| 124 | August 23 | Diamondbacks | 7–5 | Jon Garland (7–11) | Norris (3–2) | Qualls (23) | 30,612 | 61–63 |
| 125 | August 25 | @ Cardinals | 1–0 | Wainwright (15–7) | Rodríguez (11–7) | Franklin (33) | 40,512 | 61–64 |
| 126 | August 26 | @ Cardinals | 3–2 | Piñeiro (13–9) | Oswalt (7–4) | Franklin (34) | 40,311 | 61–65 |
| 127 | August 27 | @ Cardinals | 4–3 | Valverde (2–2) | McClellan (4–3) | | 40,348 | 62–65 |
| 128 | August 28 | @ Diamondbacks | 14–7 | Scherzer ((8–8) | Bazardo (0–1) | | 26,190 | 62–66 |
| 129 | August 29 | @ Diamondbacks | 9–0 | Garland (8–11) | Norris (3–3) | | 37,190 | 62–67 |
| 130 | August 30 | @ Diamondbacks | 4–3 | Haren (13–8) | Rodríguez (12–9) | Qualls (24) | 29,062 | 62–68 |
| 131 | August 31 | @ Cubs | 5–3 | Oswalt (8–5) | Harden (8–8) | Valverde (20) | 36,990 | 63–68 |

September (8–14)

| # | Date | Opponent | Score | Win | Loss | Save | Attendance | Record |
|---|---|---|---|---|---|---|---|---|
| 132 | September 1 | @ Cubs | 4–1 | Wells (10–7) | Moehler (8–10) | Mármol (7) | 36,332 | 63–69 |
| 133 | September 2 | @ Cubs | 2–0 | Lilly (10–8) | Paulino (2–0) | Mármol (8) | 39,192 | 63–70 |
| 134 | September 4 | Phillies | 7–0 | Rodríguez (13–9) | Lee (12–11) | | 30,043 | 64–70 |
| 135 | September 5 | Phillies | 5–4 | Valverde (3–2) | Lidge (0–7) | | 35,195 | 65–70 |
| 136 | September 6 | Phillies | 4–3 | Norris (3–3) | Cole Hamels (8–9) | Valverde (3–2) | 34,754 | 66–70 |
| 137 | September 7 | Phillies | 4–3 | Wright (3–2) | Park (3–3) | Valverde (22) | 29,040 | 67–70 |
| 138 | September 8 | Braves | 2–1 | Vázquez (12–9) | Paulino (2–8) | Soriano (22) | 26,081 | 67–71 |
| 139 | September 9 | Braves | 2–1 | Valverde (4–2) (4–3) | Soriano (1–5)) | | 22,392 | 68–71 |
| 140 | September 10 | Braves | 9–7 | Lowe (14–9) | Oswalt (8–6) | Gonzalez (10) | 26,552 | 68–72 |
| 141 | September 11 | Pirates | 9–1 | Norris (5–3) | Morton (3–8) | | 31,302 | 69–72 |
| 142 | September 12 | Pirates | 4–2 | Jeff Fulchino (6–4) | Ross Ohlendorf (11–10) | Valverde (22) | 35,213 | 70–72 |
| 143 | September 13 | Pirates | 2–1 | Maholm (8–8) | Paulino (2–9) | Capps (25) | 34,405 | 70–73 |
| 144 | September 14 | @ Reds | 3–1 | Arroyo (13–12) | Rodríguez (13–9) | Cordero (36) | 9,852 | 70–74 |
| 145 | September 15 | @ Reds | 5–4 | Herrera (4–4) | Gervacio (1–1) | Cordero (36) | 11,923 | 70–75 |
| 146 | September 16 | @ Reds | 6–5 | Burton (1–0) | Wright (3–3) | Cordero (37) | 10,662 | 70–76 |
| 147 | September 18 | @ Brewers | 3–2 | Weathers (4–5)) | Wright (3–4) | Hoffman (34) | 39,057 | 70–77 |
| 148 | September 19 | @ Brewers | 7–2 | Suppan (7–10) | Gervacio (1–2) | | 36,399 | 70–78 |
| 149 | September 20 | @ Brewers | 6–0 | Gallardo (13–12) | Paulino (2–10) | Manager fired | 30,024 | 70–79 |
| 150 | September 21 | Cardinals | 7–3 | Lohse (6–8) | Rodríguez (13–11) | | 34,705 | 70–80 |
| 151 | September 22 | Cardinals | 11–2 | Piñeiro (15–11) | Bazardo (0–2) | | 32,644 | 70–81 |
| 152 | September 23 | Cardinals | 3–0 | Norris (6–3) | Smoltz (3–7) | Valverde (24) | 38,732 | 71–81 |
| 153 | September 25 | Reds | 10–4 | Maloney (2–4) | Moehler (8–11) | | 37,710 | 71–82 |
| 154 | September 26 | Reds | 10–4 | Lehr (5–2) | Paulino (2–11) | | 39,476 | 71–83 |
| 155 | September 27 | Reds | 3–2 | Rodríguez (14–11) | Cuero (10–11) | Valverde (25) | 37,595 | 72–83 |
| 156 | September 28 | @ Phillies | 8–2 | Bazardo (1–2) | Cole Hamels (10–10) | | 45,146 | 73–83 |
| 157 | September 29 | @ Phillies | 7–4 | Happ (12–4) | López (0–1) | | 44,905 | 74–83 |
| 158 | September 30 | @ Phillies | 10–3 | Kendrick (3–1) | Moehler (8–12) | | 45,207 | 74–84 |

October (0–4)

| # | Date | Opponent | Score | Win | Loss | Save | Attendance | Record |
|---|---|---|---|---|---|---|---|---|
| 159 | October 1 | @ Phillies | 7–0 | Paulino (2–11) | Lee (14–13) | | 44,905 | 74–85 |
| 160 | October 2 | @ Mets | 7–1 | Maine (7–6) | Rodríguez (14–12) | | 37,576 | 74–86 |
| 161 | October 3 | @ Mets | 5–1 | Misch (3–4) | Bazardo (1–3) | F Rodríguez (35) | 37,578 | 74–87 |
| 162 | October 4 | @ Mets | 4–0 | Figueroa (3–8) | López (0–2) | | 38,135 | 74–88 |

=== Roster ===
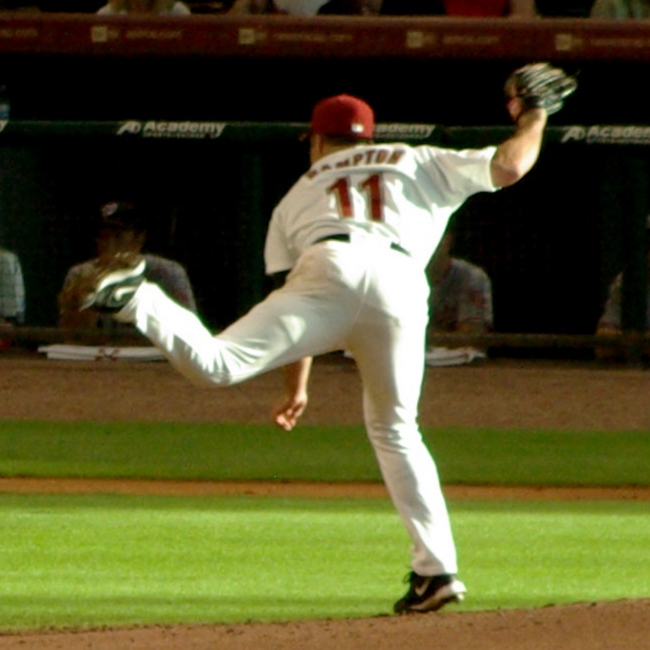
Mike Hampton delivers a pitch at Minute Maid Park in 2009.

2009 Houston Astros
Roster
| Pitchers: 50 Alberto Árias; 41 Brandon Backe; 58 Yorman Bazardo; 26 Doug Brocail; 48 Tim Byrdak; 39 Jeff Fulchino; 29 Geoff Geary; 63 Samuel Gervacio; 11 Mike Hampton; 22 LaTroy Hawkins; 59 Wilton López; 38 Brian Moehler; 20 Bud Norris; 23 Russ Ortiz; 44 Roy Oswalt; 54 Chad Paronto; 52 Felipe Paulino; 51 Wandy Rodríguez; 31 Billy Sadler; 43 Chris Sampson; 47 José Valverde; 53 Wesley Wright | Catchers: 41 Chris Coste; 55 Humberto Quintero; 12,77 Iván Rodríguez; 46 J. R. Towles; Infielders: 17 Lance Berkman; 27 Geoff Blum; 8 Aaron Boone; 23 Chris Johnson; 36 Matt Kata; 28 Jeff Keppinger; 12 Tommy Manzella; 3 Kazuo Matsui; 18 Edwin Maysonet; 31 Jason Smith; 10 Miguel Tejada; Outfielders: 21 Michael Bourn; 2 Darin Erstad; 45 Carlos Lee; 4 Jason Michaels; 9 Hunter Pence | Manager: 35 Dave Clark; 15 Cecil Cooper; Coaches: 6 Mark Bailey (bullpen); 14 Sean Berry (hitting); 35 Dave Clark (third base); 25 José Cruz (first base); 76 Al Pedrique (third base); 75 Dewey Robinson (pitching); 16 Ed Romero (bench) |

== Major League Baseball draft ==
Houston Astros 2009 MLB draft selections
| Rd. | Slot | Draftee | Position | School | Origin | Signed | Notes | Bio |
|---|---|---|---|---|---|---|---|---|
| 1 | 21 | Jiovanni Mier | Shortstop | Bonita High | (California) | Y | | |
| 2 | 69 | Tanner Bushue | Right-handed pitcher | South Central High (IL) | (Illinois) | Y | | |
| 3 | 100 | Telvin Nash | Left fielder | Griffin HS | (Georgia (U.S. state)) | Y | | |
| 3 | 111 | Jonathan Meyer | Third baseman | Simi Valley HS | (California) | Y | (Note: Supplemental pick for failure to sign 2008 third-round pick.) | |
| 4 | 131 | B. J. Hyatt | Right-handed pitcher | USC Sumter | (South Carolina) | Y | | |
| 6 | 191 | Enrique Hernández | Shortstop | American Military Academy (PR) | (Puerto Rico) | Y | (Note: MLB debut on July 1, 2014, for Houston) | |
| 7 | 221 | Dallas Keuchel | Left-handed pitcher | Arkansas • 2009 | (Oklahoma) | Y | (Note: MLB debut on June 17, 2012, for Houston) | |
| 20 | 611 | J. D. Martinez | Right fielder | Nova Southeastern | (Florida) | Y | (Note: MLB debut on July 30, 2011, for Houston) | |

== Player stats ==
Table legend
| | League leader |
| **Bold** | Team leader |

=== Batting ===
Note: Pos = Position; G = Games played; AB = At bats; R = Runs scored; H = Hits; 2B = Doubles; 3B = Triples; HR = Home runs; RBI = Runs batted in; AVG = Batting average; SB = Stolen bases

| Player | Pos | G | AB | R | H | 2B | 3B | HR | RBI | AVG | SB |
|---|---|---|---|---|---|---|---|---|---|---|---|
| Iván Rodríguez | C | 93 | 327 | 41 | 82 | 15 | 2 | 8 | 34 | .251 | 0 |
| Lance Berkman | 1B | 136 | 460 | 73 | 126 | 31 | 1 | 25 | 80 | .274 | 7 |
| Kazuo Matsui | 2B | 132 | 476 | 56 | 119 | 20 | 2 | 9 | 46 | .250 | 19 |
| Miguel Tejeda | SS | 158 | **635** | 83 | **199** | **46** | 1 | 14 | 86 | **.313** | 5 |
| Geoff Blum | 3B | 120 | 381 | 34 | 94 | 14 | 1 | 10 | 49 | .247 | 0 |
| Carlos Lee | LF | **160** | 610 | 65 | 183 | 35 | 1 | **26** | **102** | .300 | 5 |
| Michael Bourn | CF | 157 | 606 | **97** | 173 | 27 | **12** | 3 | 35 | .285 | **61** |
| Hunter Pence | RF | 159 | 585 | 76 | 165 | 26 | 5 | 25 | 72 | .282 | 14 |
| Jeff Keppinger | IF | 107 | 305 | 35 | 78 | 13 | 3 | 7 | 29 | .256 | 0 |
| Humberto Quintero | C | 60 | 157 | 11 | 37 | 8 | 1 | 4 | 14 | .236 | 0 |
| Jason Michaels | OF | 102 | 135 | 17 | 32 | 12 | 1 | 4 | 16 | .237 | 1 |
| Darin Erstad | UT | 107 | 134 | 13 | 26 | 8 | 2 | 2 | 11 | .194 | 0 |
| Chris Coste | UT | 43 | 103 | 3 | 21 | 5 | 0 | 0 | 10 | .204 | 0 |
| Edwin Maysonet | IF | 39 | 69 | 9 | 20 | 2 | 0 | 1 | 7 | .290 | 0 |
| J.R. Towles | C | 16 | 48 | 7 | 9 | 2 | 0 | 2 | 3 | .188 | 0 |
| Matt Kata | UT | 40 | 50 | 2 | 10 | 1 | 0 | 0 | 5 | .200 | 1 |
| Jason Smith | MI | 21 | 25 | 1 | 0 | 0 | 0 | 0 | 1 | .091 | 0 |
| Chris Johnson | 3B | 11 | 22 | 1 | 2 | 0 | 0 | 0 | 1 | .091 | 0 |
| Aaron Boone | CI | 10 | 13 | 0 | 0 | 0 | 0 | 0 | 0 | .000 | 0 |
| Tommy Manzella | SS | 7 | 5 | 0 | 1 | 0 | 0 | 0 | 0 | .200 | 0 |
| Pitcher totals | | 162 | 290 | 19 | 38 | 5 | 0 | 2 | 15 | .131 | 0 |
| **Team totals** | | **162** | **5436** | **643** | **1415** | **270** | **32** | **142** | **616** | **.260** | **113** |

=== Pitching ===
Note: W = Wins; L = Losses; ERA = Earned run average; G = Games pitched; GS = Games started; SV = Saves; IP = Innings pitched; R = Runs allowed; ER = Earned runs allowed; BB = Walks allowed; SO = Strikeouts; WHIP = (Walks+hits) per innings pitched

| Player | W | L | ERA | G | GS | SV | IP | R | ER | BB | SO | WHIP |
|---|---|---|---|---|---|---|---|---|---|---|---|---|
| Wandy Rodríguez SP | **14** | **12** | **3.02** | 33 | **33** | 0 | **205.2** | 77 | 69 | **63** | **193** | **1.240** |
| Roy Oswalt SP | 8 | 6 | 4.12 | 30 | 30 | 0 | 181.1 | 83 | 83 | 42 | 138 | 1.241 |
| Brian Moehler SP | 8 | **12** | 5.47 | 29 | 29 | 0 | 154.2 | **101** | **94** | 51 | 91 | 1.539 |
| Mike Hampton SP | 7 | 10 | 5.30 | 21 | 21 | 0 | 112.0 | 71 | 66 | 46 | 74 | 1.554 |
| Felipe Paulino SP | 3 | 11 | 6.27 | 23 | 17 | 0 | 97.2 | 73 | 68 | 37 | 93 | 1.669 |
| Russ Ortiz SP | 3 | 6 | 5.57 | 23 | 13 | 0 | 85.2 | 56 | 53 | 48 | 65 | 1.669 |
| José Valverde CL | 4 | 2 | 2.33 | 52 | 0 | **25** | 54.0 | 15 | 14 | 21 | 56 | 1.130 |
| Jeff Fulchino RP | 6 | 4 | 3.40 | 61 | 0 | 0 | 82.0 | 33 | 31 | 27 | 71 | 1.183 |
| LaTroy Hawkins RP | 1 | 4 | 2.13 | 65 | 0 | 11 | 63.1 | 16 | 15 | 16 | 45 | 1.200 |
| Tim Byrdak | 1 | 2 | 3.23 | **76** | 0 | 0 | 61.1 | 23 | 22 | 36 | 58 | 1.223 |
| Chris Sampson | 4 | 2 | 5.04 | 49 | 0 | 3 | 55.1 | 34 | 31 | 21 | 33 | 1.572 |
| Bud Norris | 6 | 3 | 4.53 | 11 | 10 | 0 | 55.2 | 29 | 28 | 25 | 54 | 1.509 |
| Alberto Árias | 2 | 1 | 3.35 | 42 | 0 | 0 | 45.2 | 21 | 17 | 19 | 39 | 1.489 |
| Wesley Wright | 3 | 4 | 5.44 | 49 | 0 | 0 | 44.2 | 27 | 27 | 25 | 47 | 1.746 |
| Yorman Bazardo | 1 | 3 | 7.88 | 10 | 6 | 0 | 32.0 | 31 | 28 | 22 | 17 | 1.844 |
| Sammy Gervacio | 1 | 1 | 2.14 | 29 | 0 | 0 | 21.0 | 5 | 5 | 8 | 25 | 1.143 |
| Geoff Geary | 1 | 3 | 8.10 | 16 | 0 | 0 | 20.0 | 19 | 18 | 10 | 12 | 2.000 |
| Wilton López | 0 | 2 | 8.38 | 8 | 2 | 0 | 19.1 | 21 | 18 | 8 | 9 | 2.069 |
| Doug Brocail | 1 | 0 | 4.58 | 20 | 0 | 0 | 17.2 | 9 | 9 | 13 | 9 | 1.925 |
| Brandon Backe | 0 | 0 | 10.38 | 5 | 1 | 0 | 13.0 | 15 | 15 | 6 | 10 | 2.077 |
| Chad Paronto | 0 | 0 | 12.15 | 6 | 0 | 0 | 6.2 | 9 | 9 | 1 | 3 | 2.400 |
| Billy Sadler | 0 | 0 | 13.50 | 1 | 0 | 0 | 1.1 | 2 | 2 | 1 | 2 | 13.50 |
| **Team totals** | **74** | **88** | **4.54** | **162** | **162** | **39** | **1430.0** | **770** | **722** | **546** | **1144** | **1.445** |

== Awards and achievements ==
=== Grand slams ===
| No. | Date | Astros batter | Venue | Inning | Pitcher | Opposing team | Box |
|---|---|---|---|---|---|---|---|
| 1 | June 5 | Carlos Lee | Minute Maid Park | 5 | Evan Meek | Pittsburgh Pirates | |
| 2 | July 21 | Carlos Lee | Minute Maid Park | 5 | P. J. Walters | St. Louis Cardinals | |

=== Career honors ===
Career honors received in 2009
| Honor / mention received | Individual | Role | Uni. | Start | Finish | All-Star | Bio. / Games | Summ. |
|---|---|---|---|---|---|---|---|---|
| The Sporting News MLB All-Decade Team | Jeff Kent | Second baseman | 12 | 2003 | 2004 | 1 | 275 games | |
| Sports Illustrated MLB All-Decade Team | Carlos Beltrán | Center fielder | 15 | 2004 | | 1 | 90 games | |
| Texas Sports Hall of Fame inductee | Lance Berkman | Outfielder/First baseman | 17 | 1999 | 2010 | 5 | 1,592 games | |

=== Annual awards ===
2009 Houston Astros award winners
| Name of award | | Recipient | Ref. |
|---|---|---|---|
| Darryl Kile Good Guy Award | | Brian Moehler | |
| Fred Hartman Award for Long and Meritorious Service to Baseball | | Ivy McLemore | |
| Gold Glove Award | Outfielder | Michael Bourn | |
| Houston-Area Major League Player of the Year | WAS | Adam Dunn | |
| Houston Astros | Most Valuable Player (MVP) | Michael Bourn | |
| Houston Astros | Pitcher of the Year | Wandy Rodríguez | |
| Houston Astros | Rookie of the Year | Jeff Fulchino | |
| MLB All-Star Game | Reserve outfielder | Hunter Pence | |
| MLB All-Star Game | Reserve infielder | Miguel Tejada | |
| National League (NL) Pitcher of the Month | July | Wandy Rodríguez | |
| National League (NL) Player of the Week | May 24 | Miguel Tejada | |

Other awards results

| Name of award | Voting recipient(s) (Team) | Ref. |
|---|---|---|
| NL Most Valuable Player | 1st—Pujols (STL) • 21st—Tejada (HOU) | |
| Roberto Clemente | Winner—Jeter (NYY) • Nominee—Pence (HOU) | |

=== League leaders ===
NL batting leaders

- Doubles: Miguel Tejada (46)
- Stolen bases: Michael Bourn (61)

NL fielding leaders

- Assists: Miguel Tejada (504)

== Minor league system ==
| Level | Team | League | Manager |
|---|---|---|---|
| AAA | Round Rock Express | Pacific Coast League | Marc Bombard |
| AA | Corpus Christi Hooks | Texas League | Luis Pujols |
| A | Lancaster JetHawks | California League | Wes Clements |
| A | Lexington Legends | South Atlantic League | Tom Lawless |
| A-Short Season | Tri-City ValleyCats | New York–Penn League | Jim Pankovits |
| Rookie | Greeneville Astros | Appalachian League | Rodney Linares |
| Rookie | GCL Astros | Gulf Coast League | Omar López |

Awards

- All-Star Futures Game—Catcher: Jason Castro
- Appalachian League All-Star Team—Second baseman: Jose Altuve
- Appalachian League Executive of the Year: David Lane
- Houston Astros Minor League Player of the Year: Koby Clemens
- Pacific Coast League Pitcher of the Year: Bud Norris
- Triple-A All-Star Team—Pitcher: Bud Norris

== See also ==
- List of Major League Baseball annual assists leaders
- List of Major League Baseball annual doubles leaders
- List of Major League Baseball annual stolen base leaders
- List of Major League Baseball career hits leaders
- List of Major League Baseball career home run leaders
- List of Nippon Professional Baseball career hits leaders
