= Michael Bourn =

American baseball player (born 1982)

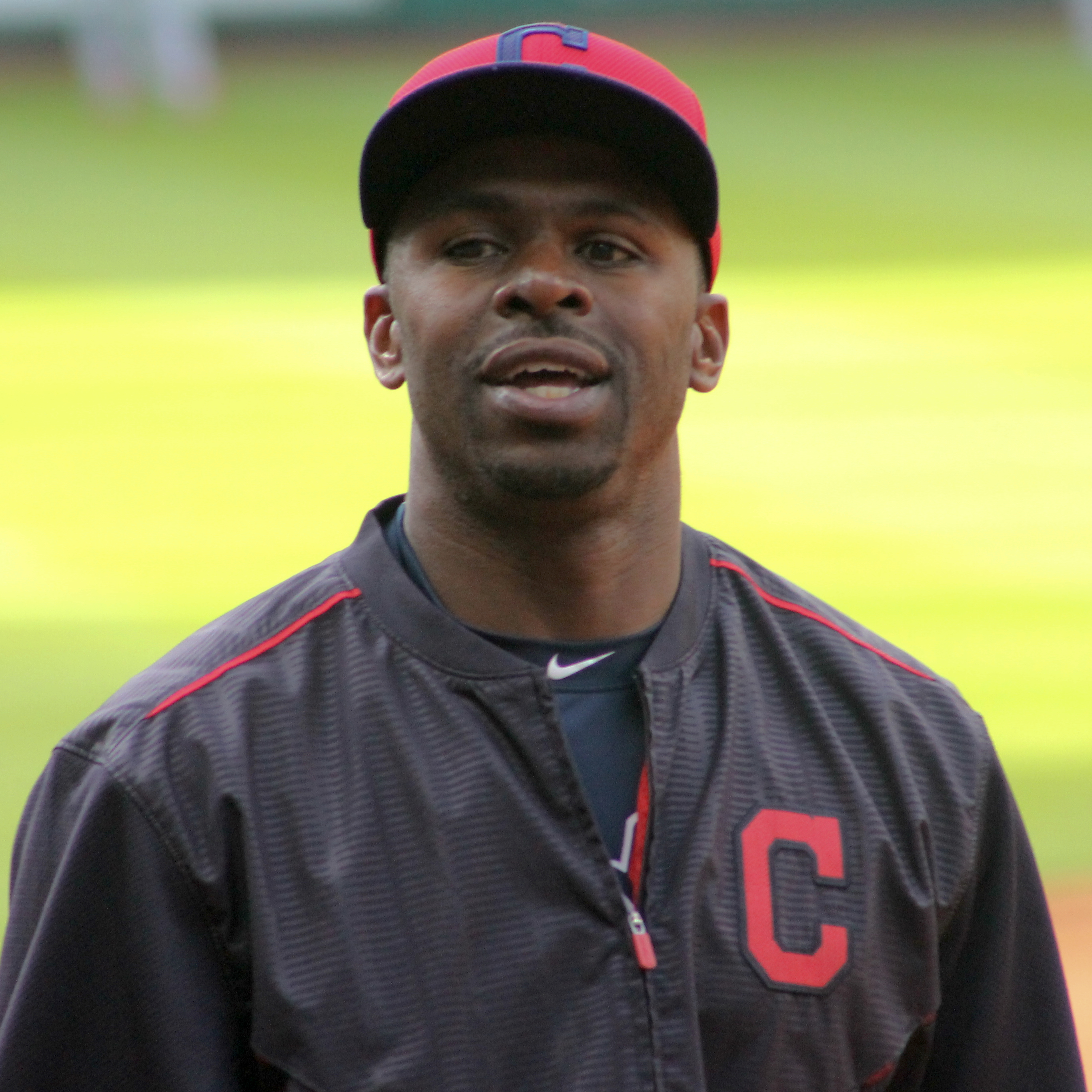
- Bourn with the Cleveland Indians in 2015
- Center fielder
- Born: December 27, 1982 (age 43); Houston, Texas, U.S.
- Batted: Left Threw: Right

MLB debut
- July 30, 2006, for the Philadelphia Phillies

Last MLB appearance
- October 2, 2016, for the Baltimore Orioles

MLB statistics
- Batting average: .266
- Home runs: 36
- Runs batted in: 361
- Stolen bases: 341
- Stats at Baseball Reference

Teams
- Philadelphia Phillies (2006–2007); Houston Astros (2008–2011); Atlanta Braves (2011–2012); Cleveland Indians (2013–2015); Atlanta Braves (2015); Arizona Diamondbacks (2016); Baltimore Orioles (2016)

Career highlights and awards
- 2× All-Star (2010, 2012); 2× Gold Glove Award (2009, 2010); 3× NL stolen base leader (2009–2011)

Michael Ray Bourn (born December 27, 1982) is an American former Major League Baseball (MLB) center fielder who played for the Philadelphia Phillies, Houston Astros, Atlanta Braves, Cleveland Indians, Arizona Diamondbacks, and Baltimore Orioles between 2006 and 2016. He also played internationally for the United States national baseball team.

Bourn was raised in Houston, Texas, where he attended Nimitz High School and the University of Houston, playing baseball. He was named to the NL All-Star team in both 2010 and 2012 and won consecutive Gold Glove Awards in 2009 and 2010. Bourn also led MLB in stolen bases in 2011, and led the National League in stolen bases from 2009 to 2011. He was as of 2018 in 119th place on the all-time Major League Baseball stolen base list, with 341.

== Amateur career ==
Michael Ray Bourn was born in Houston, Texas on December 27, 1982, the first of two sons to parents Carrie and Raymond. As a child, Michael played three sports, baseball, basketball and football. His Little League team was coached by his father. Teammates included Carl Crawford. At the age of 10, his father had him facing 85-mile-per-hour (137 km/h) pitching in a batting cage.

Bourn attended Nimitz High School in Houston. He was drafted by the Houston Astros in the 19th round of the 2000 Major League Baseball draft out of high school but declined to sign. He planned to continue his baseball career at Galveston College until Todd Whitting, then an assistant coach for the Houston Cougars baseball team, saw him playing AAU baseball and decided to offer him a scholarship.

He played college baseball with the Cougars for three seasons. While he displayed little power, collecting only two home runs and 23 extra-base hits in 644 at-bats, he won attention from professional scouts by posting a .431 on-base percentage and stealing 90 bases in 119 attempts. In 2002, he played collegiate summer baseball in the Cape Cod Baseball League for the Yarmouth-Dennis Red Sox.

He was named to the All-Tournament Team at the 2002 Conference USA baseball tournament, in which Houston was the runner-up.

== Professional career ==
=== Philadelphia Phillies ===
In June 2003, following his junior year, the Philadelphia Phillies drafted Bourn in the fourth round, with the 115th overall selection of baseball's first-year player draft. Bourn signed shortly after the draft, and was assigned to play for the Batavia Muckdogs of the Class A-Short Season New York–Penn League.

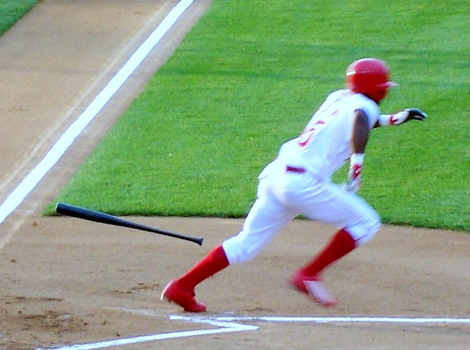
Bourn playing for the Reading Phillies, AA affiliates of the Philadelphia Phillies, in 2006

In 2004, Bourn was the starting center fielder with the Lakewood BlueClaws of the Class A South Atlantic League. Bourn ended the season with a .433 on-base percentage and an OPS of .903, earning 85 bases on balls in 109 games. He also stole 57 bases in 63 attempts – a success rate of over ninety percent. Following the season, he was named to Baseball America's Top Ten Prospects list for the Phillies organization.

Bourn started the 2006 season with the Reading Phillies of the Class AA Eastern League, and was promoted to the Scranton/Wilkes-Barre Red Barons of the Class AAA International League late in July 2006. In early September 2006, Bourn took a brief hiatus from his professional obligations to play for the USA Olympic qualifying team, for whom he hit two home runs to help Team USA defeat Cuba in the gold-medal game. Bourn was then promoted to the expanded major league roster. He was sent to home plate to bat only 11 times during the month of September, but was used frequently as a pinch runner as the Phillies competed for the National League's wild card position (ultimately coming up two games short) to the Los Angeles Dodgers. Disappointingly, he stole only one base in three attempts during the month, and was memorably tagged out after accidentally oversliding second base on a steal attempt in a late-season loss against the Washington Nationals on September 26, 2006.

In August–September 2006, Bourn played for the United States national baseball team in the qualification for the 2008 Summer Olympics. He hit two home runs in the final game of the qualifying tournament against Cuba.

After a strong performance during spring training in 2007, Bourn won a position on the Phillies' major league roster to begin the year. He was used sparingly, appearing primarily as a frequent defensive replacement in left field for Pat Burrell.

On July 15, 2007, Bourn hit his first career home run as the Phillies recorded their 10,000th franchise loss by losing to the St. Louis Cardinals 10–2. On July 27, Bourn was in the Phillies' starting lineup for the first time due to injuries to both Chase Utley and Aaron Rowand, and had his first 4-hit game in an 8–1 rout of the Pirates, in which he scored two runs.

Bourn finished third among all NL rookies with 18 stolen bases, and was caught only once. He batted .277.

=== Houston Astros ===
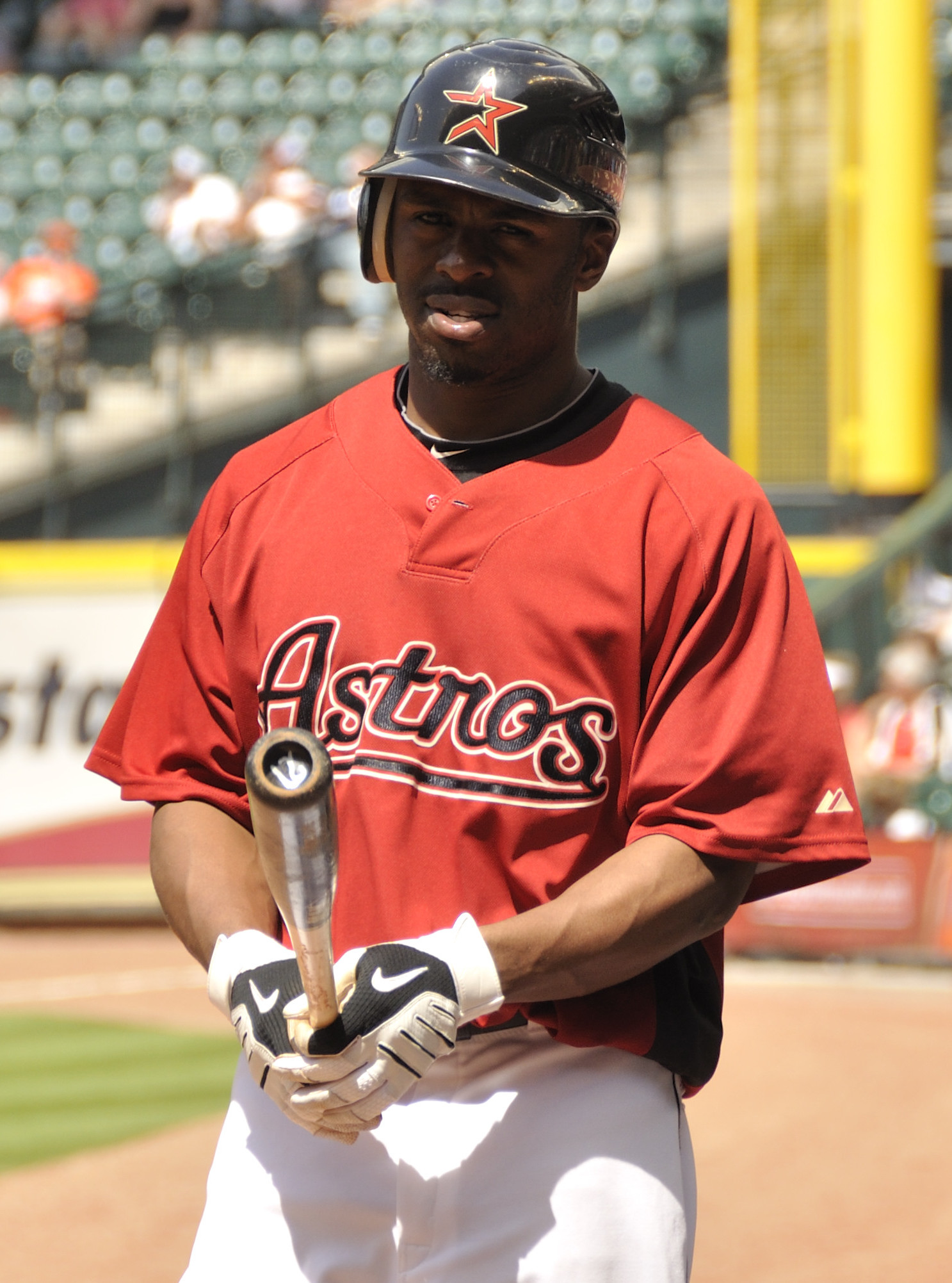
Bourn during his tenure with the Houston Astros in 2010

On November 7, 2007, Bourn was traded along with Geoff Geary and Mike Costanzo to the Houston Astros for Brad Lidge and Eric Bruntlett. Houston's General Manager, Ed Wade, declared Bourn as the 2008 Astros' leadoff hitter and starting center fielder, effectively moving Hunter Pence to right field.

Bourn stole 41 bases in 2008. He finished the season with a .229 batting average and a major league-low .288 on-base percentage and a major league-low OPS of .588, while striking out 111 times in his 467 at-bats.

In 2009 spring training, Bourn led all players in steals, with 13, while being caught twice. Bourn had a major turnaround year, as he finished with 61 stolen bases, which was the most in the National League and second in the Majors only to the 70 steals by Jacoby Ellsbury, to go along with a .285 batting average and a .354 on-base percentage in 157 games, as well as 27 doubles and 12 triples (tied for second most in the Majors with Stephen Drew) in 606 at bats. Bourn's OPS went from .588 in 2008 to .738 in 2009, which was the eighth best improvement in the Majors. His much improved play prompted former manager Cecil Cooper to informally name him the club MVP before he was fired. The Houston chapter of the Baseball Writers' Association of America formally named Bourn the Astros 2009 team MVP shortly after the end of the season.

Changing his uniform number to 21, Bourn followed up his breakout season with another successful year in 2010, being elected to the National League All-Star team and was in the outfield when the final out of the game was recorded. Bourn suffered an oblique injury on September 19 while swinging at a pitch, causing him to miss the final 3 weeks of the season. He finished the year hitting .265 with a .341 on-base percentage and a .346 slugging percentage. He won a Fielding Bible Award for his statistically based defensive excellence in center field during the year. He was later awarded his second consecutive Gold Glove award on November 10. In the videogame Nicktoons MLB, he was a featured player for the Astros despite being traded prior to the game's release.

=== Atlanta Braves ===
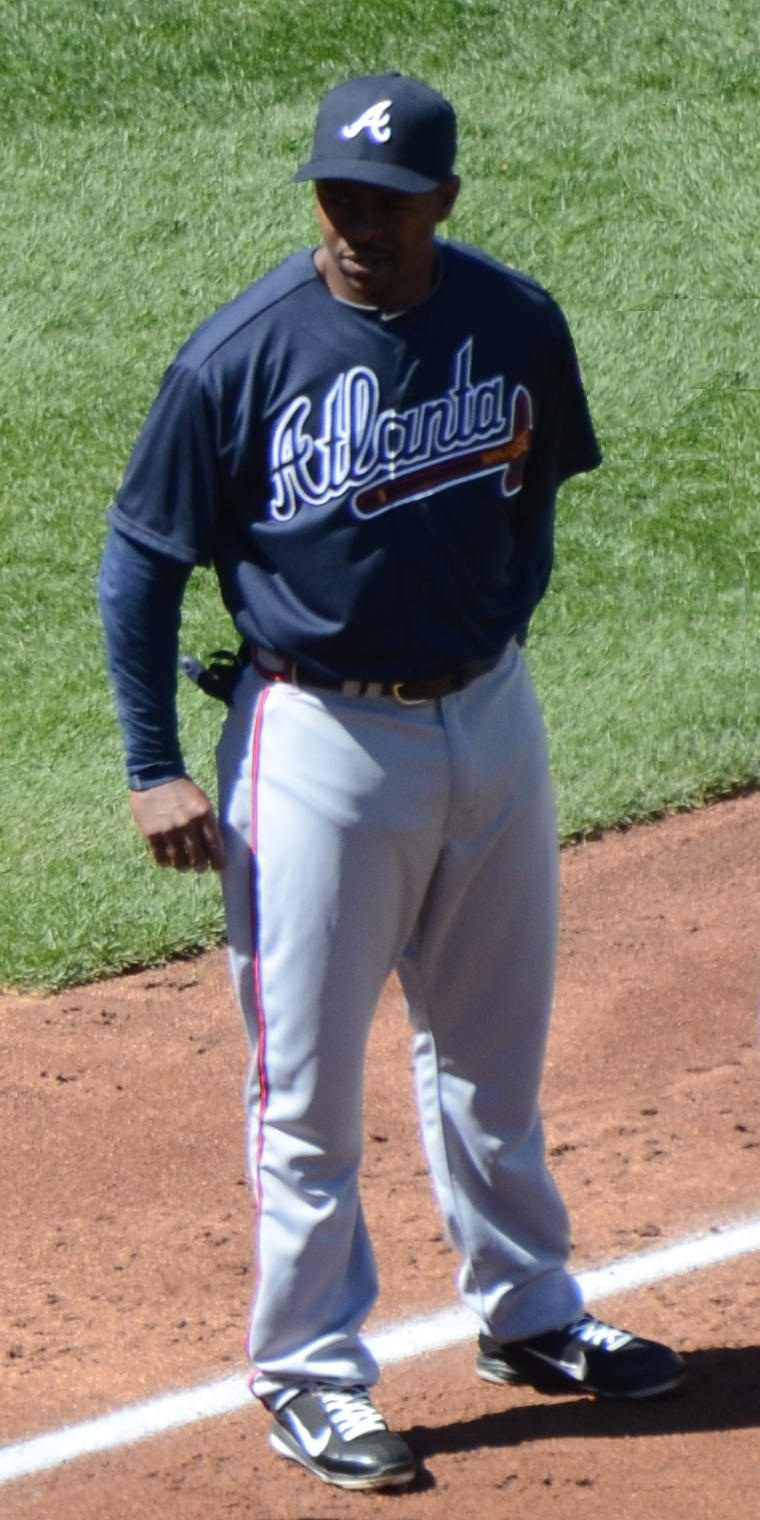
Bourn with the Atlanta Braves in 2012

In July 2011, prior to the trade deadline, Bourn was traded to the Atlanta Braves for Jordan Schafer, Brett Oberholtzer, Paul Clemens and Juan Abreu. Bourn finished 2011 with a career best .294 batting average and 61 stolen bases (39 with the Astros and 22 with the Braves).

Bourn was named a candidate in the All-Star Final Vote, with the winner being added to the 2012 MLB All-Star Game roster. Bourn finished second behind David Freese but was added to the roster a day later as a replacement for the injured Ian Desmond.

In 2012, Bourn hit .274 and with a .739 OPS for the Braves. He stole 42 bases and hit a career high nine home runs. His 155 strikeouts were a new career high. Bourn finished 18th in the voting for the N.L. MVP.

In November, Bourn rejected the Braves $13.3 million qualifying offer and became a free agent.

=== Cleveland Indians ===
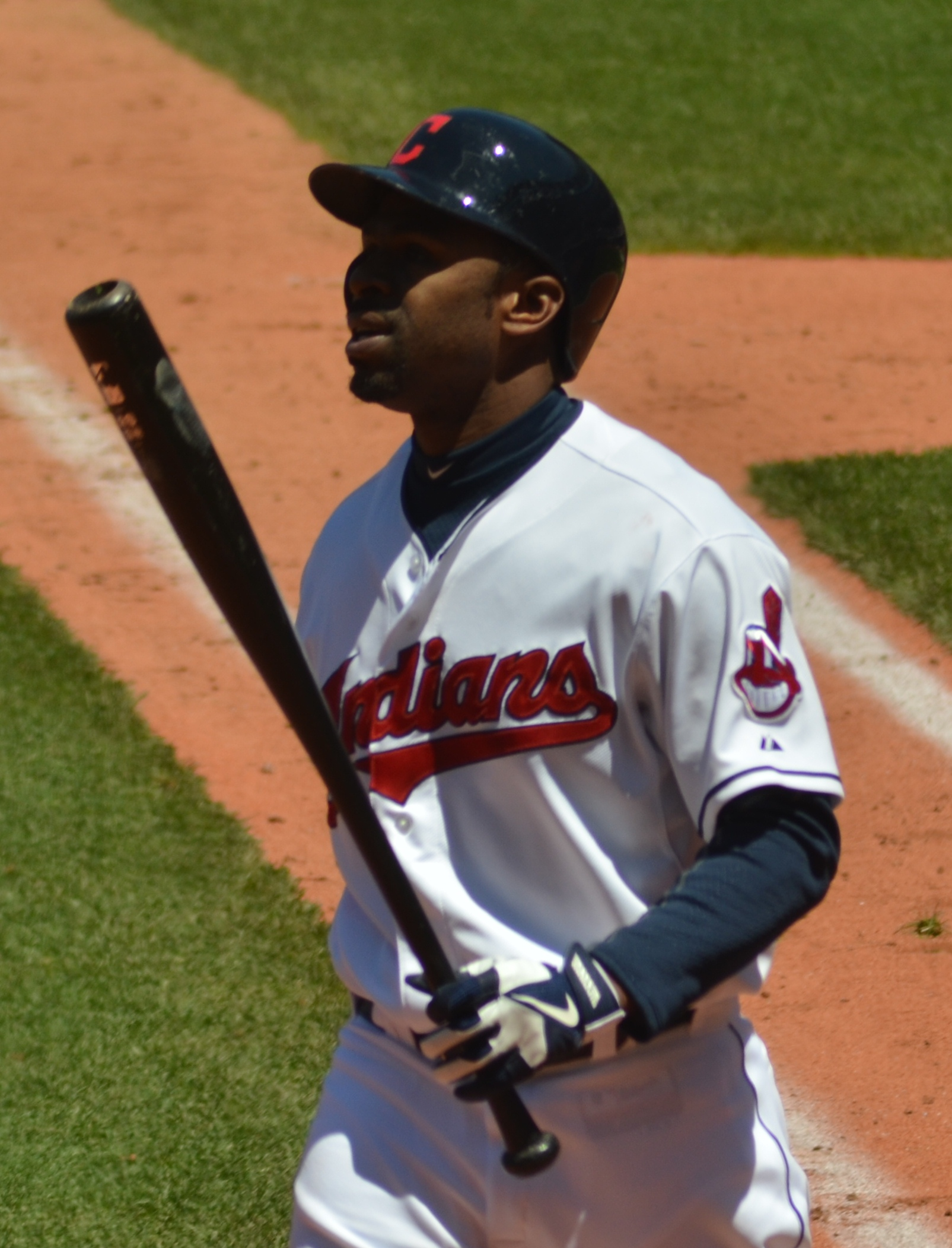
Bourn in 2013

On February 11, 2013, Bourn agreed to a four-year, $48 million contract with the Cleveland Indians that includes a vesting option for 2017, which would be met if he records 550 plate appearances in the final guaranteed year, 2016. He is the Tribe's first player to wear a number 24 on his back since Grady Sizemore from 2004 to 2011.

Bourn played in 130 games in 2013, as he battled injuries throughout the season. He had 23 steals, which was his lowest total since 2007, when he was with the Philadelphia Phillies.

On May 27, 2014, Bourn robbed White Sox captain Paul Konerko of a two-run homer in the 8th inning. The Indians lost that game 2–1. On May 30, Bourn collected his 1,000 career hit in eventual win over the Colorado Rockies. Two days later on June 1, Bourn hit a walk-off two-run home run to lead the Indians to a 6–4 win over and three–game sweep of the Rockies.

Bourn struggled offensively to begin the 2015 season. On April 26 against the Detroit Tigers, he was dropped from the leadoff spot in the lineup for the first time as a Cleveland Indian as a result of his struggles, batting ninth instead.

=== Second stint with the Atlanta Braves (2015) ===
On August 7, 2015, the Indians traded Bourn and Nick Swisher with cash considerations to the Atlanta Braves for Chris Johnson. He was designated for assignment on April 2, 2016, and released on April 14.

=== Toronto Blue Jays ===
Bourn signed a minor league contract with the Toronto Blue Jays on April 22, 2016. He was assigned to the Advanced-A Dunedin Blue Jays, and hit .257 in 9 games before being released on May 7.

=== Arizona Diamondbacks ===
On May 10, 2016, Bourn signed a minor league contract with the Arizona Diamondbacks. The Diamondbacks assigned Bourn to the Mobile BayBears of the Class AA Southern League. After playing in five games for Mobile, the Diamondbacks promoted Bourn to the major leagues.

In 89 games with the Diamondbacks, Bourn slashed .262/.307/.373 with 21 extra-base hits while driving in 30 runs and stealing 13 bases.

=== Baltimore Orioles ===
The Diamondbacks traded Bourn to the Baltimore Orioles for Jason Heinrich on August 31, 2016. Bourn made an immediate impact with the O's, hitting .283 with 2 home runs, 8 RBIs and two outfield assists in 24 games.

On February 20, 2017, Bourn re-signed with the Orioles to a minor league contract. He was released on March 27, but later resigned on April 11. The Orioles released him again on May 24, 2017.

=== Los Angeles Angels of Anaheim ===
On June 2, 2017, Bourn signed a minor league deal with the Angels. On July 2, 2017, the Angels released Bourn.

== Post-playing career ==
=== Broadcasting career ===
In 2022, Bourn served as a color commentator for the Philadelphia Phillies Radio Network. During a game between the Philadelphia Phillies and the San Diego Padres, Phillies star Bryce Harper was hit by a pitch in the hand, which broke his thumb. Bourn, who was commentating during the game, responded by saying "oooh shit!" Bourn later apologized for the expletive stating "excuse my language, I think a word might have slipped out there." While seen as a raw talent, Bourn was praised for his excitement and passion while in the booth. In 2023, it was announced that Bourn would not return to the broadcasting booth.

=== Coaching career ===
On July 2, 2026, Bourn was announced as the first base coach for the American League at the All-Star Futures Game.

== Personal life ==
Bourn's first son, Bryson, was born in 2009. Bourn has two daughters Blair and Bailey, the latter of whom was born in 2018. His wife, Nikita, owns a babysitting business and he owns three apartment complexes in Houston. Bourn is a member of the Churches of Christ.

== See also ==
- Houston Astros award winners and league leaders
- List of Houston Astros team records
- List of Major League Baseball annual triples leaders
- List of Major League Baseball career putouts as a center fielder leaders
- List of people from Houston
- List of University of Houston people
