= Jeff Frazier =

American baseball player (born 1982)

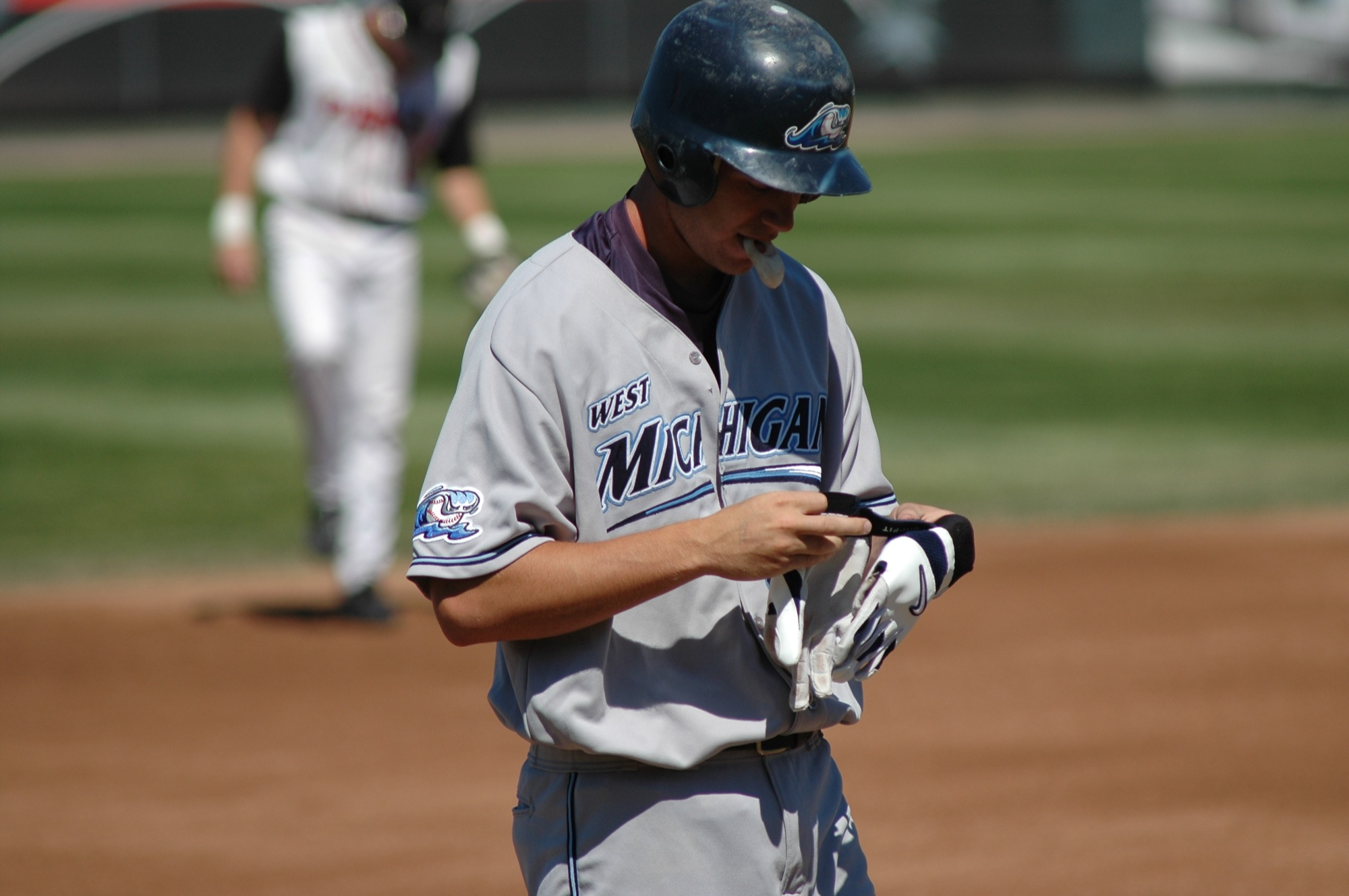
- Frazier in 2005
- Outfielder
- Born: August 10, 1982 (age 44); Point Pleasant, New Jersey, U.S.
- Batted: Right Threw: Right

MLB debut
- July 30, 2010, for the Detroit Tigers

Last MLB appearance
- August 15, 2010, for the Detroit Tigers

MLB statistics
- Batting average: .217
- Home runs: 0
- Runs batted in: 1
- Stats at Baseball Reference

Teams
- Detroit Tigers (2010)

Jeffrey Michael Frazier (born August 10, 1982) is an American former professional baseball outfielder. He played in Major League Baseball (MLB) for the Detroit Tigers in 2010.

== Career ==
=== Amateur career ===
Frazier played on Toms River, New Jersey, little league teams that made the 1995 Little League World Series and 1996 Junior League World Series. He attended Toms River High School South, where he was named The Star-Ledger's state player of the year in 2001.

Frazier attended Rutgers University and played for the Rutgers Scarlet Knights baseball team. In 2003, he played collegiate summer baseball with the Chatham A's of the Cape Cod Baseball League and was named a league all-star.

=== Detroit Tigers ===
The Detroit Tigers selected Frazier in the third round of the 2004 Major League Baseball draft. He made his professional debut with the Low-A Oneonta Tigers.

=== Seattle Mariners ===
On February 7, 2007, Frazier was traded to the Seattle Mariners in exchange for Yorman Bazardo. He made 122 appearances split between the High-A High Desert Mavericks and Double-A West Tenn Diamond Jaxx, batting a combined .276/.327/.400 with eight home runs and 57 RBI.

=== Detroit Tigers (second stint) ===
On March 28, 2008, Frazier was traded back to the Detroit Tigers in exchange for future considerations.

On July 29, 2010, Frazier was selected to the 40-man roster and promoted to the major leagues for the first time. On July 31, he recorded his first big league hit. Frazier made nine appearances for Detroit, going 5-for-23 (.217) with one RBI and one walk. On November 4, Frazier was removed from the 40-man roster and sent outright to the Triple-A Toledo Mud Hens; he subsequently elected free agency.

=== Washington Nationals ===
On November 24, 2010, Frazier signed a minor league contract with the Washington Nationals that included an invitation to spring training. He made 120 appearances for the Triple-A Syracuse Chiefs in 2011, slashing .226/.295/.364 with 10 home runs and 46 RBI.

=== Broncos de Reynosa ===
On March 1, 2012, Frazier signed with the Broncos de Reynosa of the Mexican League. In 34 appearances for Reynosa, he batted .273/.343/.359 with three home runs, 14 RBI, and one stolen base.

=== Detroit Tigers (third stint) ===
On May 3, 2012, Frazier signed a minor league contract with the Detroit Tigers, and was assigned to the Triple-A Toledo Mud Hens. In 23 appearances for Toledo, he batted .190/.200/.278 with one home run and five RBI. Frazier was released by the Tigers organization on June 17.

=== Chicago Cubs ===
On July 27, 2012, Frazier signed a minor league contract with the Chicago Cubs, and was assigned to the Triple-A Iowa Cubs. In 27 appearances for Iowa, he slashed .275/.325/.377 with one home run and seven RBI.
