= Dave Clark (baseball) =

American baseball player & coach (born 1962)

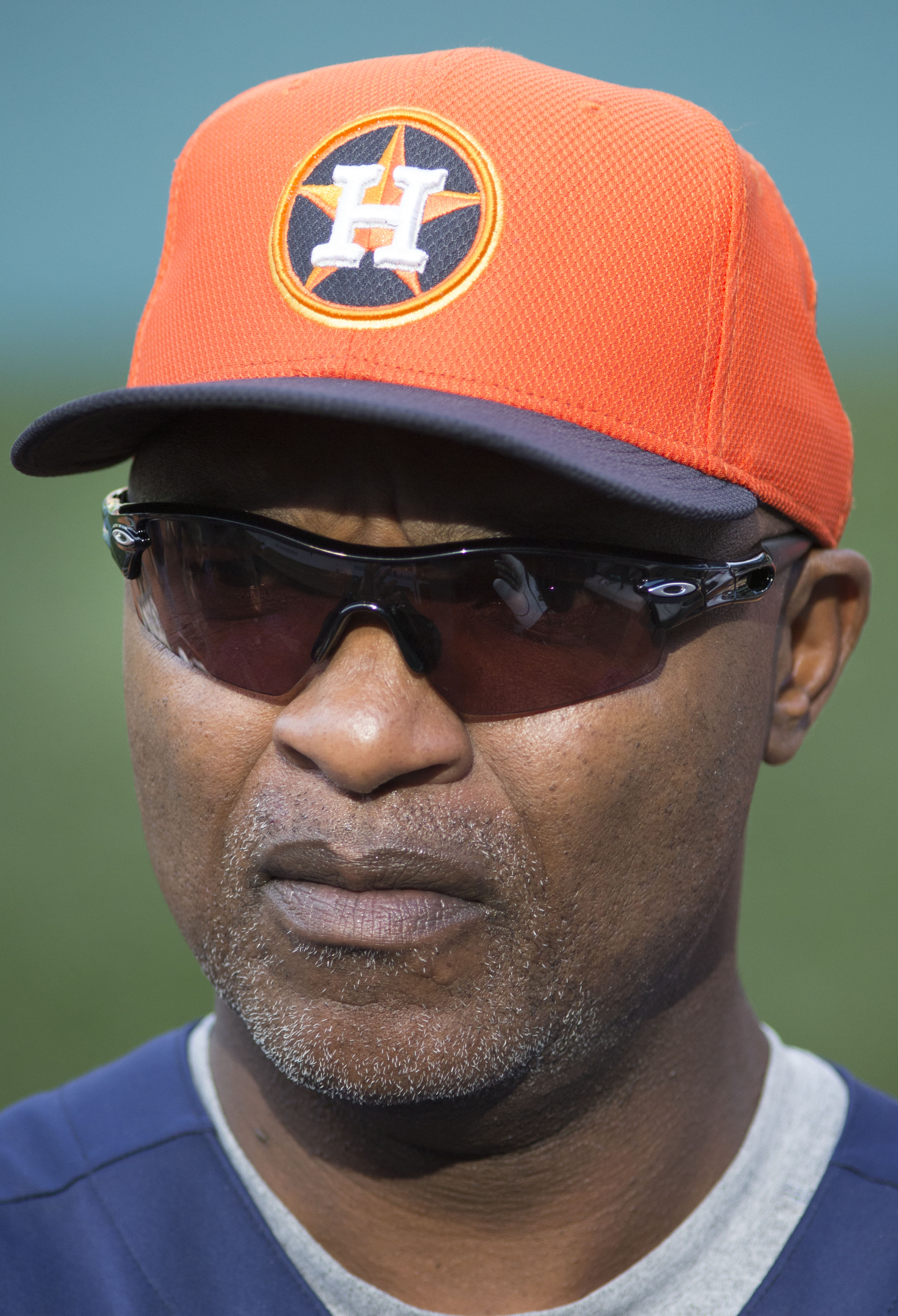
- Clark with the Houston Astros

Houston Astros – No. 23
- Outfielder / Coach
- Born: September 3, 1962 (age 63); Tupelo, Mississippi, U.S.
- Batted: Left Threw: Right

MLB debut
- September 3, 1986, for the Cleveland Indians

Last MLB appearance
- September 27, 1998, for the Houston Astros

MLB statistics
- Batting average: .264
- Home runs: 62
- Runs batted in: 284
- Managerial record: 4–9
- Winning %: .308
- Stats at Baseball Reference

Teams
- As player: Cleveland Indians (1986–1989); Chicago Cubs (1990); Kansas City Royals (1991); Pittsburgh Pirates (1992–1996); Los Angeles Dodgers (1996); Chicago Cubs (1997); Houston Astros (1998); As manager: Houston Astros (2009); As coach: Pittsburgh Pirates (2001–2002); Houston Astros (2009–2013); Detroit Tigers (2014–2020); Houston Astros (2024–present)

David Earl Clark (born September 3, 1962) is an American former baseball outfielder who is the first base coach for the Houston Astros of Major League Baseball (MLB). He previously served as the first base coach and outfield instructor for the Detroit Tigers. He served as manager of the Houston Astros Double-A affiliate, the Corpus Christi Hooks (2005–2007), and led them to the Texas League Championship in 2006. He also served as the manager of the Houston Astros' Pacific Coast League Triple-A affiliate, the Round Rock Express and served as the manager for the Huntsville Stars, the double-A affiliate for the Milwaukee Brewers. He was the interim Manager for the Houston Astros at the end of the 2009 season.

== Early life ==
Clark was born in Tupelo, Mississippi, and attended Jackson State University, where he was team MVP in 1982 and 1983.

== Baseball career ==
Clark was a first round draft pick for the Cleveland Indians in 1983, and made his Major League debut with the club as a September call up in 1986. For his career, Clark batted .264 with 62 home runs and 284 runs batted in over twelve plus seasons. His best season was with the Pittsburgh Pirates in 1994, when he batted .296 with 10 home runs and 46 RBIs.

Clark's first coaching job was within the Pirates organization in 2000. Originally hired as the hitting coach for their rookie club in the Gulf Coast League, by the end of the season he found himself holding the same job with their Triple-A affiliate, the Nashville Sounds. A season later, he was the hitting coach for the Pirates at the major league level.

After two years as the Pirates hitting coach, Clark was offered the managerial position with their advanced A affiliate, the Lynchburg Hillcats. After leading the Hillcats to the Carolina League playoffs, he moved on to the Hickory Crawdads the following season, and lead the team to a South Atlantic League championship.

In 2005, the opportunity to manage at the double-A level lured him away to the Houston Astros organization. In three seasons managing the Corpus Christi Hooks, Clark produced a 207–212 record, and in 2006, led the team to its first ever Texas League Championship.

On September 21, 2009, Clark took over as an interim manager of the Houston Astros, replacing Cecil Cooper.

Clark served as the first base coach for the Astros through the 2013 season and head coach for the Tigres del Licey of the Dominican Winter League.

On November 6, 2013, the Tigers announced the hiring of Clark as third-base coach and outfield instructor. Clark shifted to first base coach prior to the 2020 season.

On December 1, 2023, the Astros announced the hiring of Clark as first-base coach.

== Managerial record ==
Team	From	To	Regular season record				Post–season record			
Team	From	To	G	W	L	Win %	G	W	L	Win %
Houston Astros	2009	2009	13	4	9	.308	—			
Total			13	4	9	.308	0	0	0	–
Ref.:

== Personal life ==
His brother, Louis, was a wide receiver for the Seattle Seahawks, and is now the Senior Director of Pro Personnel for the Los Angeles Chargers.

Sporting positions
Preceded by Omar López	Houston Astros first base coach 2024—present	Succeeded by Incumbent
