= Jeff Fulchino =

American baseball player (born 1979)

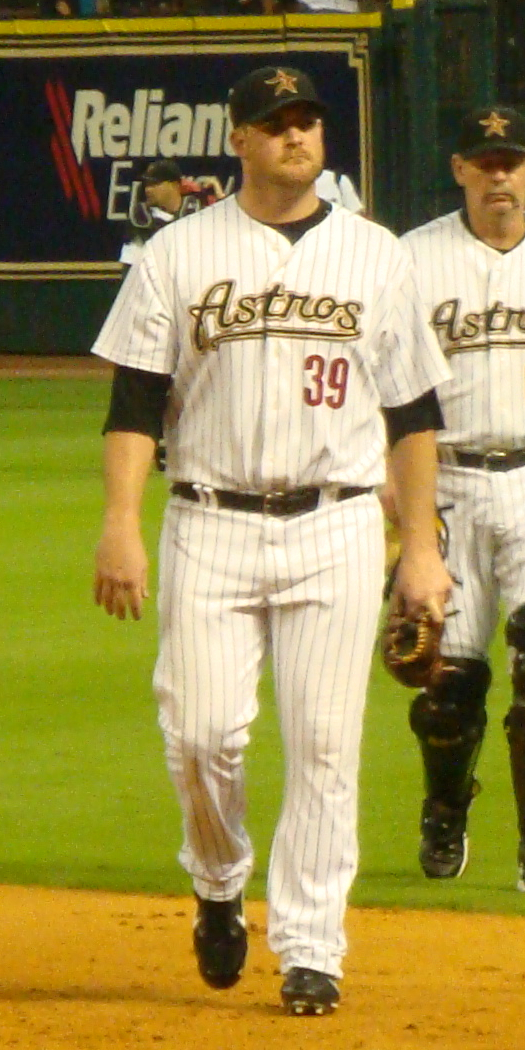
- Fulchino with the Houston Astros
- Pitcher
- Born: November 26, 1979 (age 46); Titusville, Florida, U.S.
- Batted: Right Threw: Right

MLB debut
- June 22, 2006, for the Florida Marlins

Last MLB appearance
- September 12, 2011, for the San Diego Padres

MLB statistics
- Win–loss record: 9–10
- Earned run average: 4.84
- Strikeouts: 162
- Stats at Baseball Reference

Teams
- Florida Marlins (2006); Kansas City Royals (2008); Houston Astros (2009–2011); San Diego Padres (2011)

Jeffrey Paul Fulchino (born November 26, 1979) is an American former professional baseball pitcher. He pitched in Major League Baseball (MLB) for the Florida Marlins, Kansas City Royals, Houston Astros and San Diego Padres.

== Career ==
=== Florida Marlins ===
Fulchino was drafted by the Florida Marlins in the eighth round (242nd overall) of the 2001 Major League Baseball draft. He made his major league debut (and only appearance with the Marlins) on June 22, 2006, against the Baltimore Orioles. He faced two batters, recording one out and one walk. Fulchino was optioned to the Triple-A Albuquerque Isotopes on June 25.

Fulchino spent 2007 playing for Triple-A Albuquerque, finishing 6–2 with a 5.83 ERA in 16 starts.

=== Kansas City Royals ===
On February 8, 2008, Fulchino signed a minor league contract with the Kansas City Royals. On June 8, Fulchino was called up to replace the struggling Joel Peralta. He was optioned back to the Triple-A Omaha Royals on June 23 when Peralta was recalled to the roster. Fulchino was recalled for a second time on August 15, and remained on the Royals' roster for the remainder of the season. He posted a 9.00 ERA in 12 games with Kansas City.

=== Houston Astros ===
On December 8, 2008, Fulchino was claimed off waivers by the Houston Astros.

After Fulchino's recall from the Triple-A Round Rock Express on April 12, 2009, he posted the best season of his career. He finished with a 6–4 record, throwing 81 innings over 62 games while striking out 71 batters and boasting an ERA of 3.40.

In 2010, Fulchino struggled with inconsistency and an injury to his right elbow that sidelined him for a month. He went 2–1 with a 5.51 ERA in 50 games. In the offseason, he underwent arthroscopic elbow surgery.

Fulchino made 36 appearances for the Astros in 2011, going 1–4 with a 5.18 ERA.

=== San Diego Padres ===
On September 1, 2011, Fulchino was claimed off waivers by the San Diego Padres. He posted a 16.20 ERA in three appearances with the Padres. He elected free agency on October 20, 2011.

=== Washington Nationals ===
On December 16, 2011, Fulchino signed a split contract with the Washington Nationals. He did not pitch during the season.

=== Bridgeport Bluefish ===
On April 4, 2013, Fulchino signed with the Bridgeport Bluefish of the Atlantic League of Professional Baseball. He was among five Bluefish players named to the 2013 Atlantic League All Star Game. Fulchino spent the season as the closer for Bridgeport, going 1–1 with 13 saves and a 1.29 ERA in 34 relief appearances. In August, Fulchino informed the team that he intended to retire, ending his professional baseball career.

== Post-baseball career ==
After retiring from baseball, Fulchino became a real estate agent in Monroe, Connecticut.
