= Jio Mier =

American professional baseball shortstop (born 1990)

- Shortstop
- Born: August 26, 1990 (age 35); Pomona, California, U.S.
- Bats: Right Throws: Right
- Stats at Baseball Reference

Jiovanni James Mier (born August 26, 1990) is an American former professional baseball shortstop.

== Career ==
=== Houston Astros ===
Mier was drafted by the Houston Astros with the 21st overall pick of the 2009 Major League Baseball draft out of Bonita High School in La Verne, California, and signed for a $1.358 million bonus. He was assigned to the Rookie-Advanced Greeneville Astros for the 2009 season, and posted a .276 batting average with 7 home runs and 32 runs batted in (RBI). In 2010, Mier played with the Single-A Lexington Legends, and hit .235 with 2 home runs and 53 RBI over 131 games.

Mier began the 2011 season with Lexington, and was later promoted to the High-A Lancaster JetHawks. He appeared in 114 total games that season, and hit .239 with 7 home runs and 52 RBI. Injuries limited him to 51 games in the 2012 season, in which he hit .286 with 3 home runs and 27 RBI. After the season ended, Mier played 17 games with the Mesa Solar Sox of the Arizona Fall League. He batted .297 with the Solar Sox, with 7 RBI. In 2013, he was promoted to the Double-A Corpus Christi Hooks, but put together a disappointing season both offensively and defensively, batting just .194 with 5 home runs and 28 RBI and adding 20 errors. Mier began the 2014 season with Corpus Christi, and was promoted mid-season to the Triple-A Oklahoma City RedHawks. In total, he appeared in 120 games and hit .225 with 4 home runs and 35 RBI. He spent the entire 2015 season with Corpus Christi, batting .258 with 7 home runs and 56 RBI.

=== Toronto Blue Jays ===
On November 23, 2015, Mier signed a minor league contract with the Toronto Blue Jays that included an invitation to spring training. He spent the entire season with Triple-A Buffalo, where he hit .219 with three home runs and 18 RBI in 76 games. Mier elected free agency on November 7, 2016.

=== New York Mets ===
On March 30, 2017, Mier signed a minor league contract with the New York Mets. He split the season between the Double-A Binghamton Rumble Ponies and the Triple-A Las Vegas 51s. In 80 total games, he accumulated a .231/.272/.349 batting line with 4 home runs and 33 RBI. Mier elected free agency following the season on November 6.

=== Toros de Tijuana ===
On April 10, 2018, Mier signed with the Toros de Tijuana of the Mexican Baseball League.

== Post-playing career ==
Mier is currently a deputy with the Orange County Sheriff's Department.
