= Yorman Bazardo =

Venezuelan baseball player (born 1984)

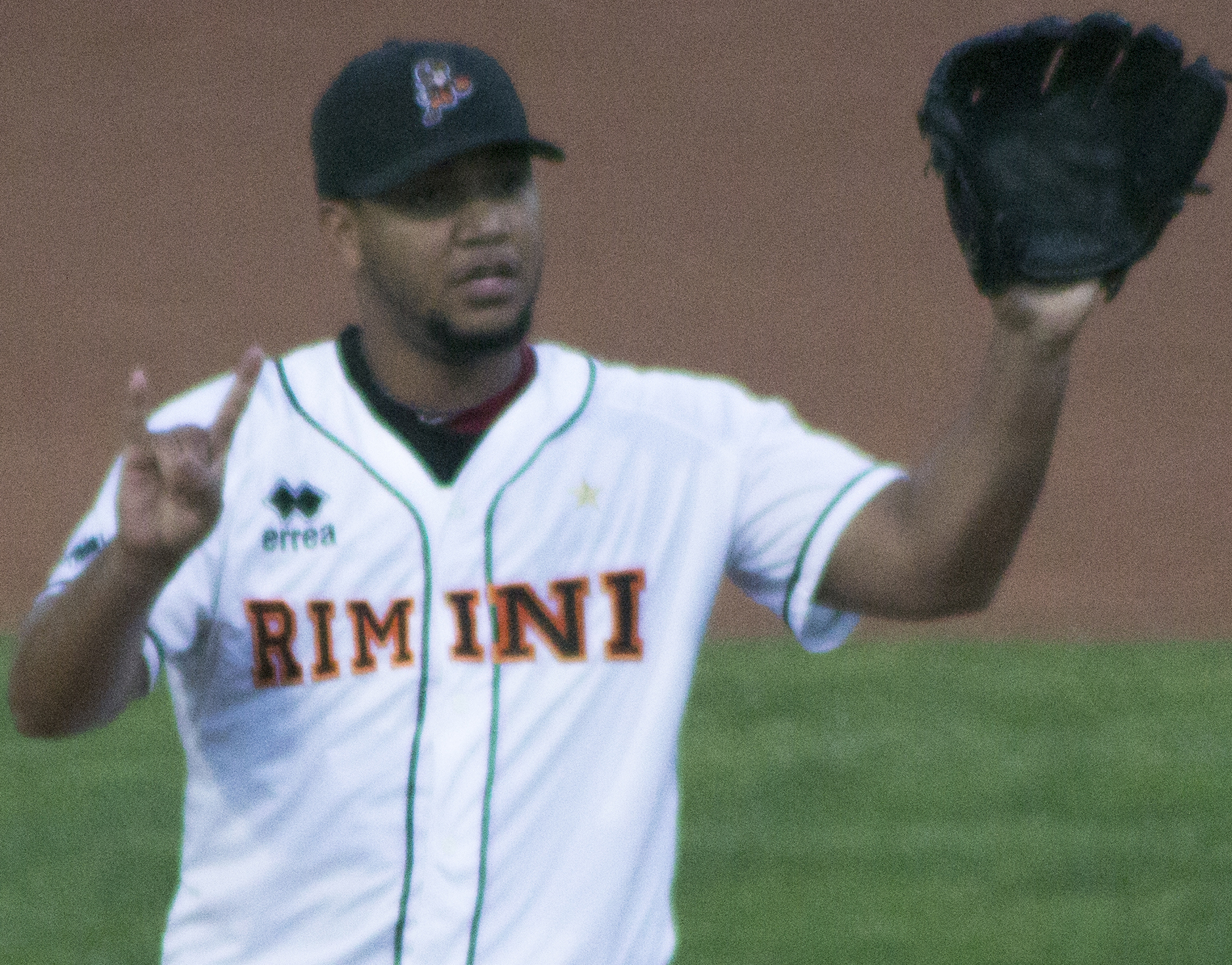
- Bazardo with the Rimini Baseball Club
- Pitcher
- Born: July 11, 1984 (age 41); Maracay, Venezuela
- Batted: Right Threw: Right

MLB debut
- May 26, 2005, for the Florida Marlins

Last MLB appearance
- October 3, 2009, for the Houston Astros

MLB statistics
- Win–loss record: 3–4
- Earned run average: 6.86
- Strikeouts: 37
- Stats at Baseball Reference

Teams
- Florida Marlins (2005); Detroit Tigers (2007–2008); Houston Astros (2009)

Yorman Michael Bazardo Osorio (born July 11, 1984) is a Venezuelan former professional baseball pitcher. He played in Major League Baseball (MLB) for the Florida Marlins, Detroit Tigers and Houston Astros.

== Playing career ==
=== Florida Marlins ===
Growing up, Bazardo played in Venezuelan youth leagues, where one of his competitors was future teammate (on two different MLB clubs) Miguel Cabrera. Bazardo got his break in 2000, when the Florida Marlins signed him as an undrafted free agent. His first season in the organization was in 2001, when he played for the now-defunct VSL Marlins in the Venezuelan Summer League, going 7–2 with a 2.43 earned run average (ERA). The Marlins moved him up to the single-A Jamestown Jammers in 2002, where he posted a 5–0 record with a 2.72 ERA and six saves. In 2003, he was promoted to the single-A Greensboro Bats and used primarily as a starting pitcher. Although he had a mixed record (9–8) his ERA remained a low 3.12. Typical was a game in August against the Hagerstown Suns in which he allowed just two runs over eight innings in a 2–0 loss.

2004 found Bazardo with the single-A Jupiter Hammerheads, where he went 5–9 with a 3.27 ERA; again, he suffered from a lack of run support and frequent errors which allowed unearned runs to score. At the end of the year the Marlins added Bazardo to their 40-man roster. A further sign of the Marlins confidence came in 2005, when Bazardo was invited to spring training, although he did not make the cut and was optioned to the double-A Carolina Mudcats. On May 26, 2005, Bazardo was called up by the Marlins to replace struggling relief pitcher Logan Kensing. Marlins manager Jack McKeon acknowledged that it was something of a gamble: "Who's to say he's not another Willis? Let's find out. Let's see if he can handle the situation. Some can't. Some can." Bazardo was rocked in his one relief appearance; giving up five runs (four of them earned) in 1 2/3 innings, and the next day he was optioned to Carolina.

Bazardo stayed with the Mudcats through the end of July, going 8–7 with a 3.99 ERA, when he was traded with Mike Flannery to the Seattle Mariners for Ron Villone.

=== Seattle Mariners ===
The Mariners assigned Bazardo to the Double-A San Antonio Missions where he went 3–1 with a 4.28 ERA. In 2006, he was named Missions pitcher of the year after going 6–5 with a 3.64 ERA in 25 starts. He was also named to the Texas League post season all-star team. Over the winter Bazardo played in the Venezuelan Winter League, where he was 2–0 with a 1.78, and threw six shutout innings in the Caribbean World Series. The Mariners added Bazardo to their 40-man roster, but designated him for assignment after acquiring veteran pitcher Jeff Weaver. Rather than lose him outright, the Mariners traded Bazardo to the Detroit Tigers for outfielder Jeff Frazier on February 7, 2007.

=== Detroit Tigers ===
The Tigers sent Bazardo to the Triple-A Toledo Mud Hens where he spent most of the 2007 season, posting a 10–6 record with an ERA of 3.75. Bazardo was called up several times in 2007 to fill in for the injury-plagued Tigers, cobbling together a 2–1 record with a 2.38 ERA in 11 appearances.

Bazardo began the 2008 season with the Tigers, but was designated for assignment after giving up eight runs over three innings in three appearances. After clearing waivers Bazardo rejoined the Mud Hens. He became a free agent at the end of the season.

=== Philadelphia Phillies ===
In December 2008, Bazardo signed a minor league contract with the Philadelphia Phillies. He was subsequently released by the organization in April 2009.

=== Houston Astros ===
On January 7, 2009, Bazardo signed a minor league contract with the Houston Astros. Assigned to their Triple-A affiliate, the Round Rock Express, Bazardo was named a Pacific Coast League midseason All-Star. On August 8, the Astros purchased Bazardo's contract, and he pitched in ten games for Houston through the end of the season, making six starts. He pitched in the minors for Houston in 2010 before becoming a free agent.

=== Minnesota Twins ===
On November 14, 2010, Bazardo signed a minor league contract with the Minnesota Twins. He was released on June 16, 2011.

=== Later career ===
In 2011, Bazardo pitched for the Camden Riversharks of the Atlantic League of Professional Baseball, registering a 7.50 ERA across 4 games for the club. After not playing affiliated ball in 2012, Bazardo joined the Telemarket Rimini of the Italian Baseball League for the 2013 season, pitching to a 4–0 record and 2.59 ERA across 7 appearances. On April 30, 2014, Bazardo signed with the Broncos de Reynosa of the Mexican League. That season, he recorded a 5–5 record and 4.11 ERA with 47 strikeouts across 18 games.

== International career ==
He was selected to the roster for the Venezuela national baseball team at the 2015 WBSC Premier12.

== Coaching career ==
On January 21, 2026, Bazardo was announced as the pitching coach for the Fort Wayne TinCaps, the High-A affiliate of the San Diego Padres.

== Personal life ==
Bazardo's younger brother Eduard made his MLB debut in April 2021 with the Boston Red Sox.

== See also ==
- List of Major League Baseball players from Venezuela
