= 2011 Arizona Diamondbacks season =

2011 Arizona Diamondbacks
- National League West champions
- League: National League
- Division: West
- Ballpark: Chase Field
- City: Phoenix, Arizona
- Record: 94–68 (.580)
- Divisional place: 1st
- Owners: Ken Kendrick
- General managers: Kevin Towers
- Managers: Kirk Gibson
- Television: Fox Sports Arizona (Daron Sutton, Greg Schulte, Mark Grace, Luis Gonzalez, Tom Candiotti, Joe Garagiola)
- Radio: KTAR (620 AM) (Greg Schulte, Tom Candiotti, Jeff Munn, Mike Fetters); KSUN (Spanish)

The Arizona Diamondbacks' 2011 season, the franchise's 14th season in Major League Baseball, included the team's first National League West championship since 2007, subsequently, their fifth division title since coming into MLB. They lost to the Milwaukee Brewers in five games in the NLDS. The Diamondbacks also hosted the All-Star Game on July 12.

== Regular season ==
=== Season standings ===
==== National League West ====
NL West
Team	W	L	Pct.	GB	Home	Road
Arizona Diamondbacks	94	68	.580	—	51‍–‍30	43‍–‍38
San Francisco Giants	86	76	.531	8	46‍–‍35	40‍–‍41
Los Angeles Dodgers	82	79	.509	11½	42‍–‍39	40‍–‍40
Colorado Rockies	73	89	.451	21	38‍–‍43	35‍–‍46
San Diego Padres	71	91	.438	23	35‍–‍46	36‍–‍45

==== National League Wild Card ====
Division leaders
Team	W	L	Pct.
Philadelphia Phillies	102	60	.630
Milwaukee Brewers	96	66	.593
Arizona Diamondbacks	94	68	.580

Wild Card team (Top team qualifies for postseason)
Team	W	L	Pct.	GB
St. Louis Cardinals	90	72	.556	—
Atlanta Braves	89	73	.549	1
San Francisco Giants	86	76	.531	4
Los Angeles Dodgers	82	79	.509	7½
Washington Nationals	80	81	.497	9½
Cincinnati Reds	79	83	.488	11
New York Mets	77	85	.475	13
Colorado Rockies	73	89	.451	17
Florida Marlins	72	90	.444	18
Pittsburgh Pirates	72	90	.444	18
Chicago Cubs	71	91	.438	19
San Diego Padres	71	91	.438	19
Houston Astros	56	106	.346	34

=== Record vs. opponents ===
2011 National League record Source: MLB Standings Grid – 2011
Team	AZ	ATL	CHC	CIN	COL	FLA	HOU	LAD	MIL	NYM	PHI	PIT	SD	SF	STL	WSH	AL
Arizona	–	2–3	3–4	4–2	13–5	5–2	6–1	10–8	4–3	3–3	3–3	3–3	11–7	9–9	3–4	5–3	10–8
Atlanta	3–2	–	4–3	3–3	6–2	12–6	5–1	2–5	5–3	9–9	6–12	4–2	4–5	6–1	1–5	9–9	10–5
Chicago	4–3	3–4	–	7–11	2–4	3–3	8–7	3–3	6–10	4–2	2–5	8–8	3–3	5–4	5–10	3–4	5–10
Cincinnati	2–4	3–3	11–7	–	3–4	3–3	9–6	4–2	8–8	2–5	1–7	5–10	4–2	5–2	9–6	4–2	7–11
Colorado	5–13	2–6	4–2	4–3	–	3–3	5–2	9–9	3–6	5–2	1–4	4–3	9–9	5–13	2–4	4–3	8–7
Florida	2–5	6–12	3–3	3–3	3–3	–	6–1	3–3	0–7	9–9	6–12	6–0	0–7	4–2	2–6	11–7	8–10
Houston	1–6	1–5	7–8	6–9	2–5	1–6	–	4–5	3–12	3–3	2–4	7–11	3–5	4–3	5–10	3–3	4–11
Los Angeles	8–10	5–2	3–3	2–4	9–9	3–3	5–4	–	2–4	2–5	1–5	6–2	13–5	9–9	4–3	4–2	6–9
Milwaukee	3–4	3–5	10–6	8–8	6–3	7–0	12–3	4–2	–	4–2	3–4	12–3	3–2	3–3	9–9	3–3	6–9
New York	3–3	9–9	2–4	5–2	2–5	9–9	3–3	5–2	2–4	–	7–11	4–4	4–3	2–4	3–3	8–10	9–9
Philadelphia	3–3	12–6	5–2	7–1	4–1	12–6	4–2	5–1	4–3	11–7	–	4–2	7–1	4–3	3–6	8–10	9–6
Pittsburgh	3–3	2–4	8–8	10–5	3–4	0–6	11–7	2–6	3–12	4–4	2–4	–	2–4	3–3	7–9	4–4	8–7
San Diego	7–11	5–4	3–3	2–4	9–9	7–0	5–3	5–13	2–3	3–4	1–7	4–2	–	6–12	3–3	3–4	6–9
San Francisco	9–9	1–6	4–5	2–5	13–5	2–4	3–4	9–9	3–3	4–2	3–4	3–3	12–6	–	5–2	3–4	10–5
St. Louis	4–3	5–1	10–5	6–9	4–2	6–2	10–5	3–4	9–9	3–3	6–3	9–7	3–3	2–5	–	2–4	8–7
Washington	3–5	9–9	4–3	2–4	3–4	7–11	3–3	2–4	3–3	10–8	10–8	4–4	4–3	4–3	4–2	–	8–7

=== Game log ===
Legend
Diamondbacks win	Diamondbacks loss	Game postponed

2011 Game Log (94–68)
April (11–15)

#	Date	Opponent	Score	Win	Loss	Save	Attendance	Record
1	April 1	@ Rockies	7–6 (11)	Demel (1–0)	Reynolds (0–1)	Putz (1)	49,374	1–0
2	April 2	@ Rockies	1–3	De La Rosa (1–0)	Hudson (0–1)	Street (1)	40,216	1–1
–	April 3	@ Rockies	Postponed (Inclement Weather) Game to be made up on May 24.					
3	April 4	@ Cubs	1–4	Wells (1–0)	Saunders (0–1)		26,292	1–2
4	April 5	@ Cubs	5–6	Russell (1–0)	Demel (1–1)	Marshall (1)	27,039	1–3
5	April 6	@ Cubs	6–4	Galarraga (1–0)	Dempster (0–2)	Putz (2)	32,272	2–3
6	April 8	Reds	13–2	Kennedy (1–0)	Wood (1–1)		48,027	3–3
7	April 9	Reds	1–6	Arroyo (2–0)	Hudson (0–2)		20,719	3–4
8	April 10	Reds	10–8	Heilman (1–0)	Masset (0–2)	Putz (3)	19,718	4–4
9	April 11	Cardinals	2–8	McClellan (1–0)	Enright (0–1)		15,746	4–5
10	April 12	Cardinals	13–8	Galarraga (2–0)	Carpenter (0–2)		16,645	5–5
11	April 13	Cardinals	5–15	Westbrook (1–1)	Kennedy (1–1)		17,660	5–6
12	April 15	Giants	2–5	Cain (2–0)	Hudson (0–3)	Wilson (3)	23,090	5–7
13	April 16	Giants	3–5	Mota (1–0)	Saunders (0–2)	Wilson (4)	25,590	5–8
14	April 17	Giants	6–5 (12)	Collmenter (1–0)	Runzler (1–2)		26,195	6–8
15	April 19	@ Reds	5–4	Galarraga (3–0)	LeCure (0–1)	Putz (4)	12,994	7–8
16	April 20	@ Reds	3–1	Kennedy (2–1)	Arroyo (2–2)	Putz (5)	14,915	8–8
17	April 21	@ Reds	4–7	Leake (3–0)	Hudson (0–4)		17,319	8–9
18	April 22	@ Mets	1–4	Pelfrey (1–2)	Vásquez (0–1)	Rodríguez (3)	26,546	8–10
19	April 23	@ Mets	4–6	Gee (2–0)	Enright (0–2)	Rodríguez (4)	25,581	8–11
20	April 24	@ Mets	4–8	Niese (1–3)	Galarraga (3–1)		22,232	8–12
21	April 25	Phillies	4–0	Kennedy (3–1)	Lee (2–2)		19,586	9–12
22	April 26	Phillies	7–5	Hudson (1–4)	Oswalt (3–1)		19,037	10–12
23	April 27	Phillies	4–8	Hamels (3–1)	Saunders (0–3)		21,825	10–13
24	April 28	Cubs	11–2	Enright (1–2)	Dempster (1–3)		21,716	11–13
25	April 29	Cubs	2–4	Zambrano (3–1)	Galarraga (3–2)	Mármol (6)	29,431	11–14
26	April 30	Cubs	3–5	Garza (1–3)	Putz (0–1)	Mármol (7)	27,652	11–15

May (19–10)

#	Date	Opponent	Score	Win	Loss	Save	Attendance	Record
27	May 1	Cubs	4–3	Hudson (2–4)	Coleman (1–2)	Putz (6)	26,605	12–15
28	May 3	Rockies	4–3	Hernandez (1–0)	Paulino (0–1)	Putz (7)	18,887	13–15
29	May 4	Rockies	4–6	Chacin (4–2)	Enright (1–3)	Street (11)	18,803	13–16
30	May 5	Rockies	3–2 (11)	Hernandez (2–0)	Belisle (2–2)	–	18,695	14–16
31	May 6	@ Padres	3–4 (11)	Qualls (1–2)	Demel (1–2)	–	30,878	14–17
32	May 7	@ Padres	6–0	Hudson (3–4)	Moseley (1–4)	–	35,936	15–17
33	May 8	@ Padres	3–4	Harang (5–2)	Saunders (0–4)	Bell (8)	21,490	15–18
34	May 10	@ Giants	0–1	Wilson (3–1)	Hernandez (2–1)	–	41,039	15–19
35	May 11	@ Giants	3–4	Sánchez (3–2)	Galarraga (3–3)	Wilson (12)	41,026	15–20
36	May 12	@ Giants	2–3	Cain (3–2)	Hudson (3–5)	López (1)	41,126	15–21
37	May 13	@ Dodgers	3–4	Kershaw (5–3)	Saunders (0–5)	Jansen (1)	35,506	15–22
38	May 14	@ Dodgers	1–0	Collmenter (2–0)	Billingsley (2–3)	Putz (8)	30,602	16–22
39	May 15	@ Dodgers	4–1	Kennedy (4–1)	Lilly (3–4)	Putz (9)	40,654	17–22
40	May 16	Padres	4–8	Richard (2–4)	Galarraga (3–4)	Adams (1)	17,958	17–23
41	May 17	Padres	6–1	Hudson (4–5)	Stauffer (0–2)		16,365	18–23
42	May 18	Braves	5–4 (11)	Heilman (2–0)	Kimbrel (1–2)	–	19,773	19–23
43	May 19	Braves	2–1	Collmenter (3–0)	Jurrjens (5–1)	Putz (10)	23,413	20–23
44	May 20	Twins	8–7	Kennedy (5–1)	Duensing (2–4)	Paterson (1)	27,450	21–23
45	May 21	Twins	9–6	Heilman (3–0)	Capps (1–3)	Putz (11)	39,776	22–23
46	May 22	Twins	3–2	Hudson (5–5)	Burnett (0–3)	Putz (12)	31,017	23–23
47	May 24	@ Rockies	4–12	Reynolds (2–0)	Collmenter (3–1)		26,378	23–24
48	May 24	@ Rockies	5–2	Saunders (1–5)	Chacin (5–3)	Putz (13)	25,096	24–24
49	May 25	@ Rockies	2–1	Kennedy (6–1)	Hammel (3–4)	Putz (14)	26,972	25–24
50	May 26	@ Rockies	6–3	Owings (1–0)	Mortensen (1–2)	Hernandez (1)	30,186	26–24
51	May 27	@ Astros	7–6	Hudson (6–5)	López (1–2)	Putz (15)	21,834	27–24
52	May 28	@ Astros	11–3	Duke (1–0)	Norris (2–4)	–	31,405	28–24
53	May 29	@ Astros	4–2	Heilman (4–0)	Fulchino (1–3)	Putz (16)	21,882	29–24
54	May 30	Marlins	15–4	Saunders (2–5)	Volstad (2–4)	–	23,465	30–24
55	May 31	Marlins	2–5	Sánchez (5–1)	Kennedy (6–2)	Oviedo (19)	17,571	30–25

June (14–13)

#	Date	Opponent	Score	Win	Loss	Save	Attendance	Record
56	June 1	Marlins	6–5	Putz (1–1)	Hensley (0–2)	–	16,169	31–25
57	June 2	Nationals	1–6	Zimmermann (3–6)	Duke (1–1)	Storen (11)	17,810	31–26
58	June 3	Nationals	4–0	Collmenter (4–1)	Maya (0–1)	–	20,332	32–26
59	June 4	Nationals	2–0	Saunders (3–5)	Hernandez (3–7)	Putz (17)	26,199	33–26
60	June 5	Nationals	4–9 (11)	Burnett (1–2)	Paterson (0–1)	–	23,129	33–27
61	June 7	@ Pirates	5–8	Resop (2–1)	Hernandez (2–2)	Hanrahan (15)	12,378	33–28
62	June 8	@ Pirates	2–3 (12)	McCutchen (2–1)	Kroenke (0–1)	–	14,015	33–29
63	June 9	@ Pirates	2–0	Owings (2–0)	Resop (2–2)	Hernandez (2)	12,468	34–29
64	June 10	@ Marlins	4–6	Sánchez (6–1)	Saunders (3–6)	Cishek (1)	18,888	34–30
65	June 11	@ Marlins	9–5	Kennedy (7–2)	Vázquez (3–6)	–	25,321	35–30
66	June 12	@ Marlins	5–1	Hudson (7–5)	Hand (0–2)	–	16,353	36–30
67	June 13	@ Marlins	12–9	Owings (3–0)	Nolasco (4–2)	Putz (18)	15,065	37–30
68	June 14	Giants	5–6	Cain (6–4)	Collmenter (4–2)	Wilson (19)	23,746	37–31
69	June 15	Giants	2–5	Bumgarner (3–8)	Saunders (3–7)	Wilson (20)	24,194	37–32
70	June 16	Giants	3–2 (10)	Hernandez (3–2)	Casilla (0–1)	–	23,468	38–32
71	June 17	White Sox	4–1	Hudson (8–5)	Jackson (4–6)	–	26,053	39–32
72	June 18	White Sox	2–6			–	33,230	39–33
73	June 19	White Sox	2–8			–	39,538	39–34
74	June 21	@ Royals	7–2	Saunders (4–7)		–	19,305	40–34
75	June 22	@ Royals	3–2				14,265	41–34
76	June 23	@ Royals	5–3				23,610	42–34
77	June 24	@ Tigers	7–6				37,335	43–34
78	June 25	@ Tigers	0–6			–	43,163	43–35
79	June 26	@ Tigers	3–8			–	41,036	43–36
80	June 27	Indians	4–5				25,726	43–37
81	June 28	Indians	6–4			–	27,076	44–37
82	June 29	Indians	2–6			–	26,876	44–38

July (15–11)

#	Date	Opponent	Score	Win	Loss	Save	Attendance	Record
83	July 1	@ Athletics	4–5				12,216	44–39
84	July 2	@ Athletics	4–2	Saunders (5–7)			30,338	45–39
85	July 3	@ Athletics	2–7				13,822	45–40
86	July 4	@ Brewers	8–6				41,622	46–40
87	July 5	@ Brewers	7–3				34,014	47–40
88	July 6	@ Brewers	1–3				36,470	47–41
89	July 7	@ Cardinals	4–1	Saunders (6–7)			35,274	48–41
90	July 8	@ Cardinals	7–6				37,160	49–41
91	July 9	@ Cardinals	6–7				42,745	49–42
92	July 10	@ Cardinals	2–4				35,299	49–43
93	July 15	Dodgers	4–6	Kershaw (10–4)	Saunders (6–8)	Guerra (5)	24,966	49–44
94	July 16	Dodgers	3–2				28,897	50–44
95	July 17	Dodgers	4–1				27,683	51–44
96	July 18	Brewers	3–0				17,404	52–44
97	July 19	Brewers	3–11				17,831	52–45
98	July 20	Brewers	2–5 (10)				19,196	52–46
99	July 21	Brewers	4–0				22,241	53–46
100	July 22	Rockies	4–8				22,768	53–47
101	July 23	Rockies	12–3				34,849	54–47
102	July 24	Rockies	7–0				28,090	55–47
103	July 26	@ Padres	6–1	Saunders (7–8)			22,679	56–47
104	July 27	@ Padres	4–3			Putz (22)	28,377	57–47
105	July 28	@ Padres	3–4				23,348	57–48
106	July 29	@ Dodgers	5–9				35,169	57–49
107	July 30	@ Dodgers	6–4		37,139	Putz (23)		58–49
108	July 31	@ Dodgers	6–3	Saunders (8–8)		Putz (24)	43,935	59–49

August (19–10)

#	Date	Opponent	Score	Win	Loss	Save	Attendance	Record
109	August 1	@ Giants	5–2			Putz (25)	42,366	60–49
110	August 2	@ Giants	6–1				42,332	61–49
111	August 3	@ Giants	1–8				42,477	61–50
112	August 5	Dodgers	4–7				27,215	61–51
113	August 6	Dodgers	3–5				33,239	61–52
114	August 7	Dodgers	4–3			Putz (26)	25,575	62–52
115	August 8	Astros	1–9				17,448	62–53
116	August 9	Astros	11–9			Putz (27)	17,814	63–53
117	August 10	Astros	6–3				18,628	64–53
118	August 11	Astros	8–5 (10)				18,418	65–53
119	August 12	Mets	4–3			Putz (28)	25,701	66–53
120	August 13	Mets	6–4			Putz (29)	33,552	67–53
121	August 14	Mets	5–3				30,148	68–53
122	August 16	@ Phillies	3–2			Putz (30)	45,742	69–53
123	August 17	@ Phillies	2–9				45,894	69–54
124	August 18	@ Phillies	1–4				45,633	69–55
125	August 19	@ Braves	2–4				30,142	69–56
126	August 20	@ Braves	1–8				39,294	69–57
127	August 21	@ Braves	0–1				34,846	69–58
128	August 22	@ Nationals	1–4				19,377	69–59
129	August 23	@ Nationals	2–0			Putz (31)	17,029	70–59
130	August 24	@ Nationals	4–2			Putz (32)	17,881	71–59
131	August 25	@ Nationals	8–1				17,666	72–59
132	August 26	Padres	5–0				34,074	73–59
133	August 27	Padres	3–1			Putz (33)	35,603	74–59
134	August 28	Padres	6–1				27,564	75–59
135	August 29	Rockies	5–1			Putz (34)	19,478	76–59
136	August 30	Rockies	9–4				20,231	77–59
137	August 31	Rockies	4–2			Putz (35)	23,062	78–59

September (16–9)

#	Date	Opponent	Score	Win	Loss	Save	Attendance	Record
138	September 2	@ Giants	2–6	Cain (11–9)	Saunders (9–12)		40,948	78–60
139	September 3	@ Giants	7–2	Kennedy (18 4)	Lincecum (12 12)		41,951	79–60
140	September 4	@ Giants	4–1			Putz (36)	42,222	80–60
141	September 5	Rockies	10–7				40,342	81–60
142	September 6	Rockies	3–8				25,691	81–61
143	September 7	Rockies	5–3	Saunders (10–12)		Putz (37)	25,320	82–61
144	September 8	Padres	4–1			Putz (38)	21,402	83–61
145	September 9	Padres	3–2				29,639	84–61
146	September 10	Padres	6–5 (10)				48,017	85–61
147	September 11	Padres	6–7				39,369	85–62
148	September 12	@ Dodgers	7–2	Saunders (11–12)		Putz (39)	30,616	86–62
149	September 13	@ Dodgers	5–4 (10)			Putz (40)	31,404	87–62
150	September 14	@ Dodgers	2–3				29,799	87–63
151	September 16	@ Padres	0–2				28,605	87–64
152	September 17	@ Padres	1–3				36,242	87–65
153	September 18	@ Padres	5–1	Saunders (12–12)		Putz (41)	30,781	88–65
154	September 19	Pirates	1–0			Putz (42)	24,458	89–65
155	September 20	Pirates	3–5		Hudson (16–11)		30,114	89–66
156	September 21	Pirates	8–5	Miley (4–2)		Putz (43)	25,296	90–66
157	September 23	Giants	3–1			Putz (44)	42,606	91–66
158	September 24	Giants	15–2				49,076	92–66
159	September 25	Giants	5–2			Putz (45)	41,243	93–66
150	September 26	Dodgers	2–4				29,116	93–67
161	September 27	Dodgers	7–6 (10)	Owings (8–0)	Guerra (2–2)		25,669	94–67
162	September 28	Dodgers	5–7	Lilly (12–14)	Saunders (12–13)	Jansen (5)	41,791	94–68

=== Opening game ===
Friday, April 1, 2011 at Coors Field in Denver, Colorado

Team	1	2	3	4	5	6	7	8	9	10	11	R	H	E
Arizona Diamondbacks	0	1	0	0	3	2	0	0	0	0	1	7	15	2
Colorado Rockies	2	1	0	0	0	1	2	0	0	0	0	6	13	1
Starting pitchers: ARI: Ian Kennedy; COL: Ubaldo Jiménez; WP: Demel (1–0) LP: Matt Reynolds (0–1) Sv: J. J. Putz

=== Last game ===
Friday, October 7, 2011 at Miller Park in Milwaukee, Wisconsin

Team	1	2	3	4	5	6	7	8	9	10	R	H	E
Arizona Diamondbacks	0	0	1	0	0	0	0	0	1	0	2	10	2
Milwaukee Brewers	0	0	0	1	0	1	0	0	0	1	3	7	1
Starting pitchers: ARI: Ian Kennedy; MIL: Yovani Gallardo; WP: John Axford (1–0) LP: J. J. Putz (0–1)

=== Roster ===
2011 Arizona Diamondbacks
Roster
Pitchers: 56 Yhency Brazobán; 33 Alberto Castillo; 55 Josh Collmenter; 48 Ryan Cook; 38 Sam Demel; 19 Zach Duke; 54 Barry Enright; 59 Armando Galarraga; 58 Juan Gutiérrez; 44 Aaron Heilman; 30 David Hernandez; 41 Daniel Hudson; 31 Ian Kennedy; 43 Zach Kroenke; 21 Jason Marquis; 45 Kameron Mickolio; 36 Wade Miley; 15 Micah Owings; 56 Jarrod Parker; 47 Joe Patterson; 40 J. J. Putz; 34 Joe Saunders; 37,39 Bryan Shaw; 32 Esmerling Vásquez; 29 Brad Ziegler	Catchers: 12 Henry Blanco; 17 Robby Hammock; 26 Miguel Montero; Infielders: 29 Brandon Allen; 18 Willie Bloomquist; 27 Geoff Blum; 33 Russell Branyan; 11,21 Sean Burroughs; 6 Stephen Drew; 44 Paul Goldschmidt; 2 Aaron Hill; 2 Kelly Johnson; 16 John McDonald; 46 Juan Miranda; 5 Melvin Mora; 22 Xavier Nady; 37 Lyle Overbay; 1 Cody Ransom; 14 Ryan Roberts; 11 Josh Wilson	Outfielders: 4 Collin Cowgill; 5 Cole Gillespie; 8 Gerardo Parra; 16 Wily Mo Pena; 10 Justin Upton; 24 Chris Young	Manager: 23 Kirk Gibson; Coaches: 25 Don Baylor (hitting); 82 Jeff Motuzas (bullpen catcher); 50 Charles Nagy (pitching); 53 Glenn Sherlock (bullpen); 3 Alan Trammell (bench); 80 Wilson Valera (coach); 9 Matt Williams (third base); 7 Eric Young (first base)

== Player stats ==
= Indicates team leader

=== Batting ===
Note: G = Games played; AB = At bats; R = Runs scored; H = Hits; 2B = Doubles; 3B = Triples; HR = Home runs; RBI = Runs batted in; AVG = Batting average; SB = Stolen bases

Player	G	AB	R	H	2B	3B	HR	RBI	AVG	SB
Brandon Allen, 1B	11	29	5	5	0	0	3	7	.172	1
Henry Blanco, C	37	100	12	25	3	1	8	12	.250	0
Willie Bloomquist, OF	97	350	44	93	10	2	4	26	.266	20
Geoff Blum, 3B	23	49	8	11	3	0	2	10	.224	0
Russell Branyan, 1B	31	62	4	13	5	0	1	2	.210	0
Sean Burroughs, 3B	78	110	8	30	4	0	1	8	.273	1
Josh Collmenter, P	29	40	2	6	0	0	0	1	.150	0
Collin Cowgill, OF	36	92	8	22	3	0	1	9	.239	4
Stephen Drew, SS	80	321	44	81	21	5	5	45	.252	4
Zach Duke, P	20	20	3	6	0	0	2	6	.300	0
Barry Enright, P	8	12	1	2	0	0	1	2	.167	0
Armando Galarraga, P	8	15	0	0	0	0	0	1	.000	0
Cole Gillespie, OF	5	6	2	2	0	0	1	4	.333	0
Paul Goldschmidt, 1B	48	156	28	39	9	1	8	26	.250	4
Robby Hammock, LF	2	2	0	0	0	0	0	0	.000	0
Aaron Heilman, P	28	1	0	0	0	0	0	0	.000	0
Aaron Hill, 2B	33	124	23	39	12	2	2	16	.315	5
Daniel Hudson, P	32	65	5	18	3	0	1	14	.277	0
Kelly Johnson, 2B	114	430	59	90	23	5	18	49	.209	13
Ian Kennedy, P	32	61	3	8	3	0	0	4	.131	0
John McDonald, SS	19	59	2	10	2	0	0	2	.169	0
Kam Mickolio, P	6	1	0	0	0	0	0	0	.000	0
Wade Miley, P	8	13	1	1	0	0	0	1	.077	0
Juan Miranda, 1B	65	174	18	37	8	2	7	23	.213	0
Miguel Montero, C	140	493	65	139	36	1	18	86	.282	1
Melvin Mora, 3B	42	127	5	29	6	0	0	16	.228	0
Lyle Overbay, 1B	18	42	3	12	4	0	1	10	.286	1
Jason Marquis, P	3	4	0	0	0	0	0	0	.000	0
Xavier Nady, 1B	82	206	26	51	11	0	4	35	.248	2
Micah Owings, P	31	19	2	4	0	0	0	1	.211	0
Jarrod Parker, P	1	2	0	1	1	0	0	0	.500	0
Gerardo Parra, OF	141	445	55	130	20	8	8	46	.292	15
Wily Mo Peña, DH	17	46	7	9	0	0	5	7	.196	0
Cody Ransom, IF	12	33	3	5	2	0	1	4	.152	1
Ryan Roberts, 3B	143	482	86	120	25	2	19	65	.249	18
Joe Saunders, P	30	61	2	12	1	0	0	4	.197	0
Justin Upton, OF	159	592	105	171	39	5	31	88	.289	21
Josh Wilson, SS	6	10	3	2	1	0	0	1	.200	0
Chris Young, OF	156	567	89	134	38	3	20	71	.236	22
Team totals	162	5421	731	1357	293	37	172	702	.250	133

All stats through September 28, 2011.

=== Pitching ===
= Indicates league leader

Note: W = Wins; L = Losses; ERA = Earned run average; G = Games pitched; GS = Games started; SV = Saves; IP = Innings pitched; H = Hits allowed; R = Runs allowed; ER = Earned runs allowed; BB = Walks allowed; K = Strikeouts

Player	W	L	ERA	G	GS	SV	IP	H	R	ER	BB	K
Yhency Brazobán	0	0	6.00	6	0	0	6.0	8	4	4	4	8
Alberto Castillo	1	0	2.31	17	0	0	11.2	10	3	3	7	6
Josh Collmenter	10	10	3.38	31	24	0	154.1	137	61	58	28	100
Ryan Cook	0	1	8.10	11	0	0	6.2	11	6	6	7	6
Sam Demel	2	2	4.21	34	0	0	25.2	31	13	12	13	15
Zach Duke	3	4	4.93	21	9	1	76.2	101	42	42	19	32
Barry Enright	1	4	7.41	7	7	0	37.2	50	31	31	15	21
Armando Galarraga	3	4	5.91	8	8	0	42.2	47	36	28	22	28
Juan Gutierrez	0	0	5.40	20	0	0	18.1	22	16	11	9	23
David Hernandez	5	3	3.38	74	0	11	69.1	49	27	26	30	77
Aaron Heilman	4	1	6.88	32	0	0	35.1	48	28	27	11	33
Daniel Hudson	16	12	3.49	33	33	0	222.0	217	98	86	50	169
Ian Kennedy	21*	4	2.88	33	33	0	222.0	186	73	71	55	198
Zach Kroenke	0	1	9.00	4	0	0	4.0	6	4	4	1	3
Jason Marquis	0	1	9.53	3	3	0	11.1	22	16	12	4	5
Kam Mickolio	0	0	6.75	6	0	0	6.2	10	5	5	3	7
Wade Miley	4	2	4.15	7	7	0	39.0	45	18	18	18	25
Micah Owings	8	0	3.63	32	4	0	62.0	56	27	25	23	44
Jarrod Parker	0	0	0.00	1	1	0	6.2	4	0	0	1	1
Joe Paterson	0	3	2.91	62	0	1	34.0	28	11	11	15	28
J. J. Putz	2	2	2.17	60	0	45	58.0	41	15	14	12	61
Joe Saunders	12	12	3.58	32	32	0	206.0	201	89	82	67	106
Bryan Shaw	1	0	2.54	33	0	0	28.1	30	9	8	8	24
Esmerling Vásquez	1	1	4.15	31	0	0	30.1	27	16	14	13	20
Brad Ziegler	0	0	1.74	23	0	0	20.2	15	7	4	6	15
Team totals	94	68	3.80	162	162	58	1443.1	1414	662	609	442	1058

- Tied with Clayton Kershaw (LAD) for league lead.

All stats through September 28, 2011.

=== 2011 N.L. Division Series vs. Milwaukee Brewers ===
Milwaukee Brewers won the series, 3–2.

Game	Date	Score	Location	Time	Attendance
1	October 1	Arizona Diamondbacks – 1, Milwaukee Brewers – 4	Miller Park	2:44	44,122
2	October 2	Arizona Diamondbacks – 4, Milwaukee Brewers – 9	Miller Park	3:29	44,066
3	October 4	Milwaukee Brewers – 1, Arizona Diamondbacks – 8	Chase Field	3:01	48,312
4	October 5	Milwaukee Brewers – 6, Arizona Diamondbacks – 10	Chase Field	3:25	38,830
5	October 7	Arizona Diamondbacks – 2, Milwaukee Brewers – 3	Miller Park	3:41	44,028

== Awards and honors ==
All-Star Game

- Miguel Montero, Catcher, Reserve
- Justin Upton, Outfield, Reserve

== Farm system ==
Level	Team	League	Manager
AAA	Reno Aces	Pacific Coast League	Brett Butler
AA	Mobile BayBears	Southern League	Turner Ward
A	Visalia Rawhide	California League	Jason Hardtke
A	South Bend Silver Hawks	Midwest League	Mark Haley
A-Short Season	Yakima Bears	Northwest League	Audo Vicente
Rookie	AZL Diamondbacks	Arizona League	Andy Green and Kelly Stinnett
Rookie	Missoula Osprey	Pioneer League	Héctor de la Cruz

League Champions: Mobile
