= 2011 San Francisco Giants season =

2011 San Francisco Giants
- League: National League
- Division: West
- Ballpark: AT&T Park
- City: San Francisco, California
- Record: 86–76 (.531)
- Divisional place: 2nd
- Owners: Bill Neukom (managing general partner)
- General managers: Brian Sabean
- Managers: Bruce Bochy
- Television: KNTV (NBC Bay Area 11) (Jon Miller, Mike Krukow, Duane Kuiper); CSN Bay Area (Duane Kuiper, Mike Krukow, Dave Flemming)
- Radio: KNBR (680 AM) (Jon Miller, Dave Flemming, Duane Kuiper, Mike Krukow); KIQI (1010 AM, Spanish) (Erwin Higueros, Tito Fuentes)

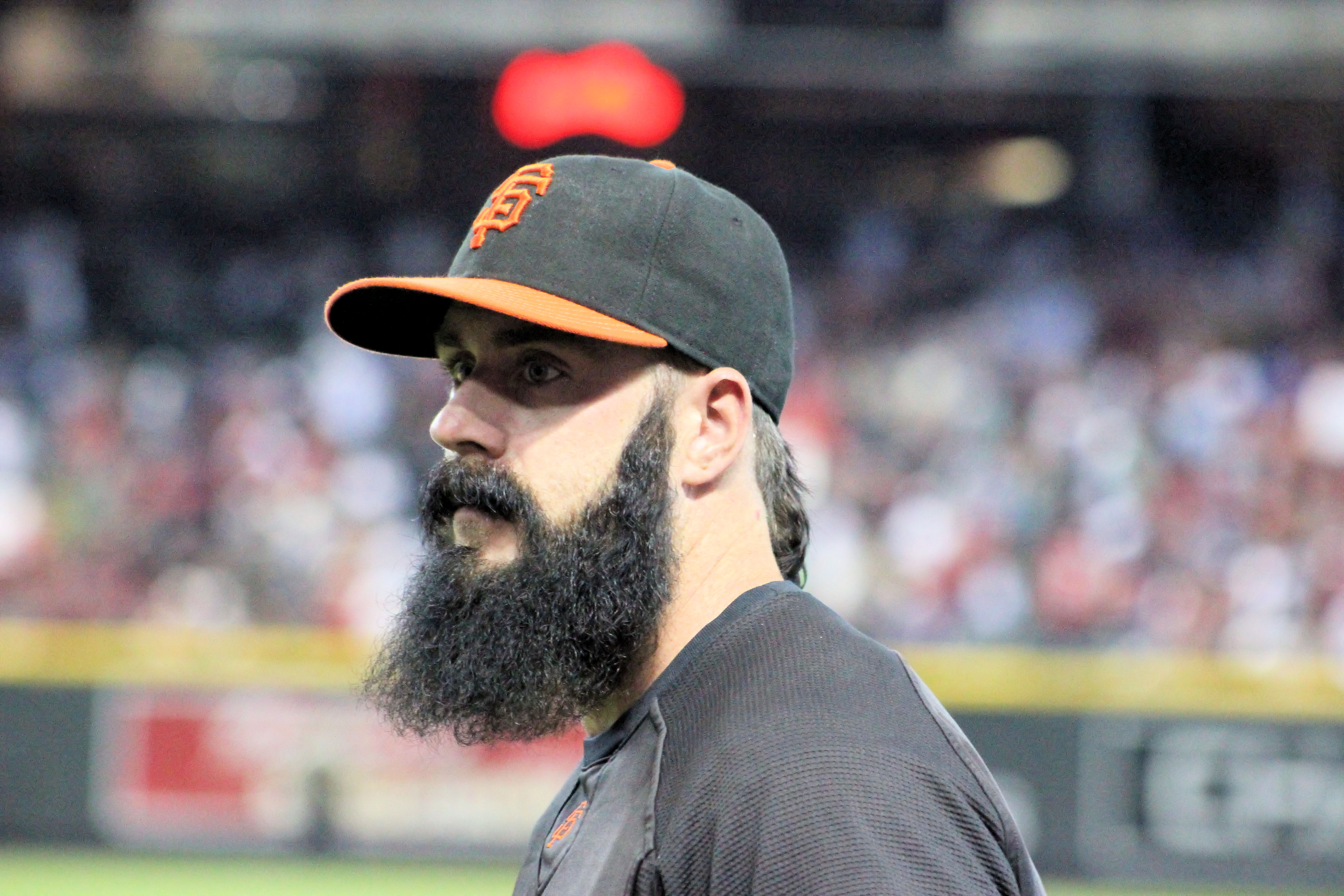
Brian Wilson (baseball) in Arizona, September 25, 2011

The San Francisco Giants are an American baseball team. Their 2011 season marked their 129th year in Major League Baseball, their fifty-fourth year in San Francisco since their move from New York following the 1957 season, and their 12th in AT&T Park. They opened the 2011 season as the defending World Series champions on March 31, 2011. However, they were eliminated from post-season contention on September 24, 2011, finishing eight games behind that season's National League West champion Arizona Diamondbacks. Despite missing the playoffs, the Giants led the majors in ninth inning comebacks.

== Regular season ==
Coming off the team's 2010 World Series success and his two-year, $22 million contract, Aubrey Huff arrived at 2011 spring training out of shape. His OPS dropped 215 points from the previous season to .676, last among Major League first baseman in 2011. Well-intentioned fans sent him thongs throughout the season in hopes of improving his fortunes. Huff was accountable for his struggles contributing to the team's failure to return to the playoffs in 2011. During the top of the 12th inning in a game against the Marlins on May 25, 2011, Scott Cousins collided with Buster Posey at home plate. It was revealed that Posey had fractures in his lower left leg and ankle and would be out of the rest of the season. Some drew comparisons of the collision with a similar collision during the 1970 All-Star game when Pete Rose collided with Ray Fosse. Without Posey's presence in the lineup, the Giants would only manage to score 570 runs on offense and missed the postseason.

- November 30, 2010 – The Giants sign free agent IF Miguel Tejada to a one-year contract.
- December 3, 2010 – The Giants re-sign free agent OF Pat Burrell to a one-year contract.
- March 30, 2011 – As spring training concludes, the Giants add rookie 1B Brandon Belt to the 25-man roster and 1B Travis Ishikawa is designated for assignment.
- April 20, 2011 – With LF Cody Ross returning from the disabled list, Brandon Belt is optioned to Fresno.
- April 28, 2011 – P Ryan Vogelsong, replacing an injured Barry Zito makes his first major league start since 2004, earning the win.
- April 30, 2011 – 3B Pablo Sandoval breaks the hamate bone in his right hand and is placed on the disabled list.
- May 25, 2011 – C Buster Posey fractures his lower left leg and ankle in a collision at home plate with Scott Cousins of the Florida Marlins, ending his season.
- May 26, 2011 – SS Brandon Crawford is added to the 40-man roster and promoted to San Francisco from San Jose. Ryan Rohlinger is designated for assignment.
- June 10, 2011 – IF Freddy Sanchez suffers a dislocated shoulder while diving for a ball in a game against the Cincinnati Reds.
- June 13, 2011 – 3B Pablo Sandoval is activated from the disabled list.
- June 28, 2011 – P Barry Zito returns to the mound after more than two months on the disabled list, earning the win to complete a doubleheader sweep of the Chicago Cubs. Zito replaces an injured Jonathan Sánchez in the rotation.
- July 3, 2011 – Pitchers Matt Cain, Tim Lincecum, Ryan Vogelsong, and Brian Wilson are named to the All-Star Team.
- July 10, 2011 – 3B Pablo Sandoval is named to the All-Star Team as an injury replacement for José Reyes.
- July 14, 2011 – 2B/3B Mike Fontenot is activated from the disabled list.
- July 19, 2011 – The Giants acquire IF Jeff Keppinger in a trade with the Houston Astros and recall Brandon Belt from the minors for the third time in 2011.
- July 27, 2011 – The Giants acquire OF Carlos Beltrán in a trade with the New York Mets for prospect P Zack Wheeler.
- July 31, 2011 – The Giants acquire IF Orlando Cabrera in a trade with the Cleveland Indians for prospect OF Thomas Neal.
- August 27, 2011 – LHP Eric Surkamp is promoted from AA Richmond and makes his major league debut in a start against the Houston Astros, earning a no-decision.
- August 31, 2011 – OF Aaron Rowand and IF Miguel Tejada are designated for assignment. IF Brett Pill is promoted from Fresno and OF Pat Burrell is activated from the disabled list
- September 6, 2011 – 1B Brett Pill hits a home run off Wade LeBlanc of the San Diego Padres in his first at bat in the major leagues.
- September 15, 2011 – 3B Pablo Sandoval hits for the cycle at Coors Field against the Colorado Rockies.
- September 23, 2011 – The Giants are eliminated from the NL Western division with a 3–1 loss to the Arizona Diamondbacks, who simultaneously clinch the divisional title.
- September 24, 2011 – The Giants are eliminated from postseason contention with a 15–2 loss in Arizona.

=== Season standings ===
==== National League West ====
NL West
Team	W	L	Pct.	GB	Home	Road
Arizona Diamondbacks	94	68	.580	—	51‍–‍30	43‍–‍38
San Francisco Giants	86	76	.531	8	46‍–‍35	40‍–‍41
Los Angeles Dodgers	82	79	.509	11½	42‍–‍39	40‍–‍40
Colorado Rockies	73	89	.451	21	38‍–‍43	35‍–‍46
San Diego Padres	71	91	.438	23	35‍–‍46	36‍–‍45

==== National League Wild Card ====
Division leaders
Team	W	L	Pct.
Philadelphia Phillies	102	60	.630
Milwaukee Brewers	96	66	.593
Arizona Diamondbacks	94	68	.580

Wild Card team (Top team qualifies for postseason)
Team	W	L	Pct.	GB
St. Louis Cardinals	90	72	.556	—
Atlanta Braves	89	73	.549	1
San Francisco Giants	86	76	.531	4
Los Angeles Dodgers	82	79	.509	7½
Washington Nationals	80	81	.497	9½
Cincinnati Reds	79	83	.488	11
New York Mets	77	85	.475	13
Colorado Rockies	73	89	.451	17
Florida Marlins	72	90	.444	18
Pittsburgh Pirates	72	90	.444	18
Chicago Cubs	71	91	.438	19
San Diego Padres	71	91	.438	19
Houston Astros	56	106	.346	34

=== Record vs. opponents ===
2011 National League record Source: MLB Standings Grid – 2011
Team	AZ	ATL	CHC	CIN	COL	FLA	HOU	LAD	MIL	NYM	PHI	PIT	SD	SF	STL	WSH	AL
Arizona	–	2–3	3–4	4–2	13–5	5–2	6–1	10–8	4–3	3–3	3–3	3–3	11–7	9–9	3–4	5–3	10–8
Atlanta	3–2	–	4–3	3–3	6–2	12–6	5–1	2–5	5–3	9–9	6–12	4–2	4–5	6–1	1–5	9–9	10–5
Chicago	4–3	3–4	–	7–11	2–4	3–3	8–7	3–3	6–10	4–2	2–5	8–8	3–3	5–4	5–10	3–4	5–10
Cincinnati	2–4	3–3	11–7	–	3–4	3–3	9–6	4–2	8–8	2–5	1–7	5–10	4–2	5–2	9–6	4–2	7–11
Colorado	5–13	2–6	4–2	4–3	–	3–3	5–2	9–9	3–6	5–2	1–4	4–3	9–9	5–13	2–4	4–3	8–7
Florida	2–5	6–12	3–3	3–3	3–3	–	6–1	3–3	0–7	9–9	6–12	6–0	0–7	4–2	2–6	11–7	8–10
Houston	1–6	1–5	7–8	6–9	2–5	1–6	–	4–5	3–12	3–3	2–4	7–11	3–5	4–3	5–10	3–3	4–11
Los Angeles	8–10	5–2	3–3	2–4	9–9	3–3	5–4	–	2–4	2–5	1–5	6–2	13–5	9–9	4–3	4–2	6–9
Milwaukee	3–4	3–5	10–6	8–8	6–3	7–0	12–3	4–2	–	4–2	3–4	12–3	3–2	3–3	9–9	3–3	6–9
New York	3–3	9–9	2–4	5–2	2–5	9–9	3–3	5–2	2–4	–	7–11	4–4	4–3	2–4	3–3	8–10	9–9
Philadelphia	3–3	12–6	5–2	7–1	4–1	12–6	4–2	5–1	4–3	11–7	–	4–2	7–1	4–3	3–6	8–10	9–6
Pittsburgh	3–3	2–4	8–8	10–5	3–4	0–6	11–7	2–6	3–12	4–4	2–4	–	2–4	3–3	7–9	4–4	8–7
San Diego	7–11	5–4	3–3	2–4	9–9	7–0	5–3	5–13	2–3	3–4	1–7	4–2	–	6–12	3–3	3–4	6–9
San Francisco	9–9	1–6	4–5	2–5	13–5	2–4	3–4	9–9	3–3	4–2	3–4	3–3	12–6	–	5–2	3–4	10–5
St. Louis	4–3	5–1	10–5	6–9	4–2	6–2	10–5	3–4	9–9	3–3	6–3	9–7	3–3	2–5	–	2–4	8–7
Washington	3–5	9–9	4–3	2–4	3–4	7–11	3–3	2–4	3–3	10–8	10–8	4–4	4–3	4–3	4–2	–	8–7

=== Game log ===
Legend
	Giants win
	Giants loss
	Postponement
**Bold**	Giants team member

2011 Game Log
March (0–1)

#	Date	Opponent	Score	Win	Loss	Save	Attendance	Record
1	March 31	@ Dodgers	**L** 2–1	Kershaw (1–0)	**Lincecum** (0–1)	Broxton (1)	56,000	0–1

April (13–12)

#	Date	Opponent	Score	Win	Loss	Save	Attendance	Record
2	April 1	@ Dodgers	**L** 4–3	Billingsley (1–0)	**Sánchez** (0–1)	Broxton (2)	44,834	0–2
3	April 2	@ Dodgers	**W** 10–0	**Cain** (1–0)	Lilly (0–1)		40,809	1–2
4	April 3	@ Dodgers	**L** 7–5	Kuroda (1–0)	**Runzler** (0–1)	Broxton (3)	50,896	1–3
5	April 5	@ Padres	**L** 3–1	Harang (1–0)	**Bumgarner** (0–1)	Bell (2)	43,146	1–4
6	April 6	@ Padres	**W** 8–4	**Lincecum** (1–1)	Stauffer (0–1)	**Ramírez** (1)	24,368	2–4
7	April 8	Cardinals	**W** 5–4 (12)	**Runzler** (1–1)	Tallet (0–1)		42,048	3–4
8	April 9	Cardinals	**W** 3–2	**Ramírez** (1–0)	Franklin (0–1)		41,742	4–4
9	April 10	Cardinals	**L** 6–1	Lohse (1–1)	**Zito** (0–1)		42,092	4–5
10	April 11	Dodgers	**L** 6–1	Kershaw (2–1)	**Bumgarner** (0–2)		40,870	4–6
11	April 12	Dodgers	**W** 5–4	**Affeldt** (1–0)	Hawksworth (1–1)	**Wilson** (1)	41,960	5–6
12	April 13	Dodgers	**W** 4–3	**Sánchez** (1–1)	Lilly (0–2)	**Wilson** (2)	42,060	6–6
13	April 15	@ Diamondbacks	**W** 5–2	**Cain** (2–0)	Hudson (0–3)	**Wilson** (3)	23,090	7–6
14	April 16	@ Diamondbacks	**W** 5–3	**Mota** (1–0)	Saunders (0–2)	**Wilson** (4)	25,590	8–6
15	April 17	@ Diamondbacks	**L** 6–5 (12)	Collmenter (1–0)	**Runzler** (1–2)		26,195	8–7
16	April 18	@ Rockies	**W** 8–1	**Lincecum** (2–1)	Rogers (2–1)		31,079	9–7
17	April 19	@ Rockies	**W** 6–3	**Sánchez** (2–1)	Jiménez (0–1)	**Wilson** (5)	30,320	10–7
18	April 20	@ Rockies	**L** 10–2	de la Rosa (3–0)	**Cain** (2–1)		27,758	10–8
19	April 22	Braves	**L** 4–1	Hanson (2–3)	**Bumgarner** (0–3)	Kimbrel (5)	42,404	10–9
20	April 23	Braves	**L** 5–2	Hudson (3–2)	**Lincecum** (2–2)	Kimbrel (6)	42,395	10–10
21	April 24	Braves	**L** 9–6 (10)	O'Flaherty (1–1)	**Wilson** (0–1)	Venters (1)	42,295	10–11
22	April 26	@ Pirates	**W** 6–3	**Romo** (1–0)	Hanrahan (0–1)	**Wilson** (6)	9,832	11–11
23	April 27	@ Pirates	**L** 2–0	McDonald (1–2)	**Bumgarner** (0–4)	Hanrahan (7)	9,048	11–12
24	April 28	@ Pirates	**W** 5–2	**Vogelsong** (1–0)	Karstens (2–1)	**Wilson** (7)	14,747	12–12
25	April 29	@ Nationals	**L** 3–0	Marquis (3–0)	**Lincecum** (2–3)		21,399	12–13
26	April 30	@ Nationals	**W** 2–1	**Mota** (2–0)	Lannan (2–3)	**Wilson** (8)	28,766	13–13

May (16–12)

#	Date	Opponent	Score	Win	Loss	Save	Attendance	Record
27	May 1	@ Nationals	**L** 5–2	Zimmermann (2–4)	**Cain** (2–2)	Storen (5)	21,611	13–14
28	May 2	@ Nationals	**L** 2–0	Gorzelanny (1–2)	**Bumgarner** (0–5)	Storen (6)	15,342	13–15
29	May 3	@ Mets	**W** 7–6 (10)	**López** (1–0)	Buchholz (1–1)	**Wilson** (9)	32,288	14–15
30	May 4	@ Mets	**W** 2–0	**Lincecum** (3–3)	Capuano (2–3)	**Wilson** (10)	29,333	15–15
31	May 5	@ Mets	**L** 5–2	Pelfrey (2–3)	**Sánchez** (2–2)	Rodríguez (7)	23,433	15–16
32	May 6	Rockies	**W** 4–3	**Wilson** (1–1)	Paulino (0–2)		41,982	16–16
33	May 7	Rockies	**W** 3–2	**Wilson** (2–1)	Paulino (0–3)		41,611	17–16
34	May 8	Rockies	**W** 3–0	**Vogelsong** (2–0)	de la Rosa (4–1)	**Wilson** (11)	42,132	18–16
35	May 10	Diamondbacks	**W** 1–0	**Wilson** (3–1)	Hernandez (2–1)		41,039	19–16
36	May 11	Diamondbacks	**W** 4–3	**Sánchez** (3–2)	Galarraga (3–3)	**Wilson** (12)	41,026	20–16
37	May 12	Diamondbacks	**W** 3–2	**Cain** (3–2)	Hudson (3–5)	**López** (1)	41,126	21–16
38	May 13	@ Cubs	**L** 11–4	Dempster (2–4)	**Bumgarner** (0–6)		37,433	21–17
39	May 14	@ Cubs	**W** 3–0 (6)†	**Vogelsong** (3–0)	Davis (0–1)		39,706	22–17
–	May 15	@ Cubs	Postponed (rain) Rescheduled for June 28					
40	May 16	@ Rockies	**L** 7–4	Mortensen (1–0)	**Lincecum** (3–4)	Street (13)	33,228	22–18
41	May 17	@ Rockies	**L** 5–3	Belisle (4–2)	**Sánchez** (3–3)	Street (14)	41,105	22–19
42	May 18	@ Dodgers	**W** 8–5	**Wilson** (4–1)	Cormier (0–1)		30,421	23–19
43	May 19	@ Dodgers	**W** 3–1	**Bumgarner** (1–6)	Billingsley (2–4)	**Wilson** (13)	34,248	24–19
44	May 20	Athletics	**W** 2–1 (10)	**López** (2–0)	Fuentes (1–5)		42,224	25–19
45	May 21	Athletics	**W** 3–0	**Lincecum** (4–4)	Anderson (2–4)		42,152	26–19
46	May 22	Athletics	**W** 5–4 (11)	**Romo** (2–0)	Fuentes (1–6)		42,288	27–19
47	May 24	Marlins	**L** 5–1	Nolasco (4–0)	**Cain** (3–3)	Núñez (18)	41,165	27–20
48	May 25	Marlins	**L** 7–6 (12)	Webb (1–3)	**Mota** (2–1)	Badenhop (1)	41,037	27–21
49	May 26	Marlins	**L** 1–0	Sánchez (4–1)	**Vogelsong** (3–1)		41,472	27–22
50	May 27	@ Brewers	**W** 5–4	**Lincecum** (5–4)	Marcum (6–2)	**Wilson** (14)	37,034	28–22
51	May 28	@ Brewers	**L** 3–2	Axford (1–1)	**Mota** (2–2)		42,512	28–23
52	May 29	@ Brewers	**L** 6–0	Gallardo (7–2)	**Cain** (3–4)		43,035	28–24
53	May 30	@ Cardinals	**W** 7–3	**Bumgarner** (2–6)	McClellan (6–2)		40,849	29–24
54	May 31	@ Cardinals	**L** 4–3	Franklin (1–3)	**López** (2–1)	Salas (10)	37,748	29–25

June (17–11)

#	Date	Opponent	Score	Win	Loss	Save	Attendance	Record
55	June 1	@ Cardinals	**W** 7–5 (11)	**Romo** (3–0)	Franklin (1–4)	**Wilson** (15)	35,775	30–25
56	June 2	@ Cardinals	**W** 12–7	**Sánchez** (4–3)	Lynn (0–1)	**Affeldt** (1)	34,104	31–25
57	June 3	Rockies	**W** 3–1	**Cain** (4–4)	Nicasio (1–1)	**Wilson** (16)	41,021	32–25
58	June 4	Rockies	**L** 2–1	Chacín (6–4)	**Bumgarner** (2–7)	Street (15)	41,046	32–26
59	June 5	Rockies	**W** 2–1	**Vogelsong** (4–1)	Lindstrom (0–1)	**Wilson** (17)	41,369	33–26
60	June 6	Nationals	**W** 5–4 (13)	**Lopez** (3–1)	Stammen (0–1)		41,180	34–26
61	June 7	Nationals	**L** 2–1	Zimmermann (4–6)	**Sánchez** (4–4)	Storen (12)	41,786	34–27
62	June 8	Nationals	**W** 3–1	**Cain** (5–4)	Burnett (1–3)		41,738	35–27
63	June 9	Reds	**L** 3–0	Cueto (3–2)	**Bumgarner** (2–8)	Cordero (12)	41,106	35–28
64	June 10	Reds	**W** 3–2	**Wilson** (5–1)	Arredondo (0–1)		41,686	36–28
65	June 11	Reds	**L** 10–2	Leake (6–2)	**Lincecum** (5–5)		41,735	36–29
66	June 12	Reds	**W** 4–2	**Ramírez** (2–0)	Arredondo (0–2)	**Wilson** (18)	42,084	37–29
67	June 14	@ Diamondbacks	**W** 6–5	**Cain** (6–4)	Collmenter (4–2)	**Wilson** (19)	23,746	38–29
68	June 15	@ Diamondbacks	**W** 5–2	**Bumgarner** (3–8)	Saunders (3–7)	**Wilson** (20)	24,194	39–29
69	June 16	@ Diamondbacks	**L** 3–2 (10)	Hernandez (3–2)	**Casilla** (0–1)		23,468	39–30
70	June 17	@ Athletics	**L** 5–2	Godfrey (1–0)	**Lincecum** (5–6)	Bailey (3)	36,067	39–31
71	June 18	@ Athletics	**L** 4–2	Ziegler (2–0)	**Sánchez** (4–5)	Bailey (4)	36,067	39–32
72	June 19	@ Athletics	**L** 2–1	Cahill (7–5)	**Affeldt** (1–1)	Fuentes (12)	36,067	39–33
73	June 21	Twins	**L** 9–2	Pavano (5–5)	**Bumgarner** (3–9)		41,958	39–34
74	June 22	Twins	**W** 5–1	**Vogelsong** (5–1)	Blackburn (6–5)		41,886	40–34
75	June 23	Twins	**W** 2–1	**Lincecum** (6–6)	Duensing (4–7)	**Wilson** (21)	42,481	41–34
76	June 24	Indians	**W** 4–3	**Casilla** (1–1)	Carrasco (7–4)	**Wilson** (22)	41,690	42–34
77	June 25	Indians	**W** 1–0	**Cain** (7–4)	Masterson (5–6)	**Wilson** (23)	42,130	43–34
78	June 26	Indians	**W** 3–1	**Bumgarner** (4–9)	Carmona (4–10)	**Affeldt** (2)	41,978	44–34
79	June 28 From May 15	@ Cubs	**W** 13–7	**Vogelsong** (6–1)	Davis (1–7)		39,157	45–34
80	June 28‡	@ Cubs	**W** 6–2	**Zito** (1–1)	López (0–2)	**Wilson** (24)	38,360	46–34
81	June 29	@ Cubs	**L** 2–1	Mármol (2–2)	**Romo** (3–1)		37,221	46–35
82	June 30	@ Cubs	**L** 5–2 (13)	Grabow (1–0)	**Ramírez** (2–1)		38,158	46–36

July (15–11)

#	Date	Opponent	Score	Win	Loss	Save	Attendance	Record
83	July 1	@ Tigers	**W** 4–3	**Wilson** (6–1)	Valverde (2–3)	**Affeldt** (3)	35,583	47–36
84	July 2	@ Tigers	**W** 15–3	**Zito** (2–1)	Scherzer (9–4)	**Mota** (1)	38,983	48–36
85	July 3	@ Tigers	**L** 6–3	Porcello (7–6)	**Affeldt** (1–2)	Valverde (20)	31,904	48–37
86	July 4	Padres	**L** 5–3	Richard (5–9)	**Lincecum** (6–7)	Bell (25)	42,300	48–38
87	July 5	Padres	**L** 5–3	Stauffer (5–5)	**Cain** (7–5)	Bell (26)	41,403	48–39
88	July 6	Padres	**W** 6–5 (14)	**Lopez** (4–1)	Neshek (1–1)		41,916	49–39
89	July 7	Padres	**W** 2–1	**Zito** (3–1)	Luebke (2–3)	**Wilson** (25)	41,521	50–39
90	July 8	Mets	**L** 5–2	Beato (2–1)	**Wilson** (6–2)	Rodríguez (23)	41,028	50–40
91	July 9	Mets	**W** 3–1	**Lincecum** (7–7)	Capuano (8–8)	**Romo** (1)	42,117	51–40
92	July 10	Mets	**W** 4–2	**Cain** (8–5)	Pelfrey (5–8)	**Wilson** (26)	42,123	52–40
93	July 14	@ Padres	**W** 6–2 (12)	**Casilla** (2–1)	Gregerson (2–3)	**Wilson** (27)	32,292	53–40
94	July 15	@ Padres	**W** 6–1	**Lincecum** (8–7)	Moseley (2–9)		42,055	54–40
95	July 16	@ Padres	**L** 11–3	Luebke (3–3)	**Zito** (3–2)		42,024	54–41
96	July 17	@ Padres	**W** 4–3 (11)	**Lopez** (5–1)	Qualls (4–4)	**Wilson** (28)	36,351	55–41
97	July 18	Dodgers	**W** 5–0	**Vogelsong** (7–1)	Billingsley (8–8)		42,323	56–41
98	July 19	Dodgers	**W** 5–3	**Bumgarner** (5–9)	Kuo (0–1)	**Wilson** (29)	42,391	57–41
99	July 20	Dodgers	**L** 1–0	Kershaw (11–4)	**Lincecum** (8–8)	Guerra (6)	42,487	57–42
100	July 22	Brewers	**L** 4–2	Marcum (9–3)	**Cain** (8–6)	Axford (27)	42,297	57–43
101	July 23	Brewers	**W** 4–2	**Vogelsong** (8–1)	Wolf (6–8)	**Wilson** (30)	42,277	58–43
102	July 24	Brewers	**W** 2–1	**Bumgarner** (6–9)	Gallardo (11–7)	**Wilson** (31)	42,262	59–43
103	July 26	@ Phillies	**L** 7–2	Worley (7–1)	**Zito** (3–3)		45,740	59–44
104	July 27	@ Phillies	**W** 2–1	**Cain** (9–6)	Hamels (12–6)	**Wilson** (32)	45,800	60–44
105	July 28	@ Phillies	**W** 4–1	**Lincecum** (9–8)	Kendrick (5–5)	**Wilson** (33)	45,646	61–44
106	July 29	@ Reds	**L** 4–3 (13)	Arredondo (2–3)	**Wilson** (6–3)		29,016	61–45
107	July 30	@ Reds	**L** 7–2	Leake (9–6)	**Bumgarner** (6–10)		40,402	61–46
108	July 31	@ Reds	**L** 9–0	Cueto (7–4)	**Zito** (3–4)		37,864	61–47

August (11–18)

#	Date	Opponent	Score	Win	Loss	Save	Attendance	Record
109	August 1	Diamondbacks	**L** 5–2	Kennedy (13–3)	**Cain** (9–7)	Putz (25)	42,366	61–48
110	August 2	Diamondbacks	**L** 6–1	Hudson (11–7)	**Lincecum** (9–9)		42,332	61–49
111	August 3	Diamondbacks	**W** 8–1	**Vogelsong** (9–1)	Marquis (8–6)		42,477	62–49
112	August 4	Phillies	**L** 3–0	Lee (11–7)	**Bumgarner** (6–11)		42,013	62–50
113	August 5	Phillies	**L** 9–2	Worley (8–1)	**Sánchez** (4–6)		42,165	62–51
114	August 6	Phillies	**L** 2–1	Hamels (13–6)	**Cain** (9–8)		42,183	62–52
115	August 7	Phillies	**W** 3–1	**Lincecum** (10–9)	Oswalt (4–7)	**Wilson** (34)	42,366	63–52
116	August 8	Pirates	**L** 5–0	Morton (9–6)	**Vogelsong** (9–2)		42,405	63–53
117	August 9	Pirates	**W** 6–0	**Bumgarner** (7–11)	McDonald (7–6)		42,648	64–53
118	August 10	Pirates	**L** 9–2	Karstens (9–6)	**Sánchez** (4–7)		42,603	64–54
119	August 12	@ Marlins	**L** 2–1	Nolasco (9–8)	**Cain** (9–9)	Núñez (32)	22,431	64–55
120	August 13	@ Marlins	**W** 3–0	**Lincecum** (11–9)	Vasquez (7–10)	**Wilson** (35)	25, 013	65–55
121	August 14	@ Marlins	**W** 5–2	**Vogelsong** (10–2)	Volstad (5–9)	**Ramírez** (2)	20,020	66–55
122	August 15	@ Braves	**L** 5–4	Martínez (1–2)	**Wilson** (6–4)		23,498	66–56
123	August 16	@ Braves	**L** 2–1 (11)	Arodys Vizcaíno (1–0)	**Lopez** (5–2)		22,108	66–57
124	August 17	@ Braves	**W** 7–5	**Cain** (10–9)	Jurrjens (12–5)		22,202	67–57
125	August 18	@ Braves	**L** 1–0	Minor (3–2)	**Lincecum** (11–10)	Kimbrel (37)	30,720	67–58
126	August 19	@ Astros	**L** 6–0	Rodríguez (9–9)	**Vogelsong** (10–3)		26,259	67–59
127	August 20	@ Astros	**L** 7–5	Lyles (2–7)	**Bumgarner** (7–12)	Melancon (13)	29,046	67–60
128	August 21	@ Astros	**W** 6–4 (11)	**Affeldt** (2–2)	Melancon (6–4)	**Ramírez** (3)	25,838	68–60
129	August 23	Padres	**L** 7–5	Hamren (1–0)	**Ramírez** (2–2)	Bell (35)	41,288	68–61
130	August 24	Padres	**W** 2–1	**Lincecum** (12–10)	Stauffer (8–10)	**Casilla** (1)	41,542	69–61
131	August 25	Astros	**L** 3–1	Sosa (1–2)	**Vogelsong** (10–4)	Melancon (14)	41,115	69–62
132	August 26	Astros	**W** 2–1	**Bumgarner** (8–12)	Happ (4–15)	**Casilla** (2)	41,438	70–62
133	August 27	Astros	**W** 2–1 (10)	**Affeldt** (3–2)	Rodriguez (2–3)		42,318	71–62
134	August 28	Astros	**L** 4–3 (11)	Melancon (7–4)	**Ramírez** (2–3)	Carpenter (1)	41,681	71–63
135	August 29	Cubs	**L** 7–0	Wells (6–4)	**Lincecum** (12–11)		41,063	71–64
136	August 30	Cubs	**L** 5–2	Garza (7–10)	**Vogelsong** (10–5)	Mármol (31)	41,165	71–65
137	August 31	Cubs	**W** 4–0	**Bumgarner** (9–12)	Lopez (4–6)		41,099	72–65

September (14–11)

#	Date	Opponent	Score	Win	Loss	Save	Attendance	Record
138	September 2	Diamondbacks	**W** 6–2	**Cain** (11–9)	Saunders (9–12)		40,948	73–65
139	September 3	Diamondbacks	**L** 7–2	Kennedy (18–4)	**Lincecum** (12–12)		41,915	73–66
140	September 4	Diamondbacks	**L** 4–1	Hudson (15–9)	**Vogelsong** (10–6)	Putz (36)	42,222	73–67
141	September 5	@ Padres	**W** 7–2	**Bumgarner** (10–12)	Stauffer (8–12)		25,066	74–67
142	September 6	@ Padres	**W** 6–4	**Surkamp** (1–0)	LeBlanc (2–5)	**Ramírez** (4)	21,866	75–67
143	September 7	@ Padres	**L** 3–1	Harang (13–5)	**Cain** (11–10)	Bell (36)	18,173	75–68
144	September 9	Dodgers	**L** 2–1	Kershaw (18–5)	**Casilla** (2–2)	Guerra (17)	41,902	75–69
145	September 10	Dodgers	**L** 3–0	Eveland (2–0)	**Vogelsong** (10–7)	Guerra (18)	42,121	75–70
146	September 11	Dodgers	**W** 8–1	**Bumgarner** (11–12)	Kuroda (11–16)		41,466	76–70
147	September 12	Padres	**W** 8–3	**Surkamp** (2–0)	Harang (13–6)		41,069	77–70
148	September 13	Padres	**W** 3–2 (12)	**Ramírez** (3–3)	Brach (0–2)		41,510	78–70
149	September 14	Padres	**W** 3–1	**Lincecum** (13–12)	Latos (7–14)	**Casilla** (3)	41,209	79–70
150	September 15	@ Rockies	**W** 8–5	**Vogelsong** (11–7)	Chacín (11–12)	**Casilla** (4)	34,364	80–70
151	September 16	@ Rockies	**W** 9–1	**Bumgarner** (12–12)	White (3–2)		47,302	81–70
152	September 17	@ Rockies	**W** 6–5	**Joaquin** (1–0)	Street (1–4)	**Casilla** (5)	38,961	82–70
153	September 18	@ Rockies	**W** 12–5	**Cain** (12–10)	Rogers (6–6)		31,875	83–70
154	September 20	@ Dodgers	**L** 2–1	Kershaw (20–5)	**Lincecum** (13–13)	Guerra (19)	32,526	83–71
155	September 21	@ Dodgers	**W** 8–5	**Vogelsong** (12–7)	Eveland (2–2)	**Wilson** (36)	32,334	84–71
156	September 22	@ Dodgers	**L** 8–2	Kuroda (13–16)	**Bumgarner** (12–13)		37,560	84–72
157	September 23	@ Diamondbacks	**L** 3–1	Hernandez (5–3)	**Cain** (12–11)	Putz (44)	42,606	84–73
158	September 24	@ Diamondbacks	**L** 15–2	Kennedy (21–4)	**Surkamp** (2–1)		49,076	84–74
159	September 25	@ Diamondbacks	**L** 5–2	Collmenter (10–10)	**Lincecum** (13–14)	Putz (45)	41,243	84–75
160	September 26	Rockies	**W** 3–1	**Vogelsong** (13–7)	Chacín (11–14)	**Casilla** (6)	41,956	85–75
161	September 27	Rockies	**W** 7–0	**Bumgarner** (13–13)	White (3–4)		42,370	86–75
162	September 28	Rockies	**L** 6–3	Pomeranz (2–1)	**Surkamp** (2–2)	Betancourt (8)	41,873	86–76

† Shortened game (rain)
‡ Double-header

=== Roster ===
2011 San Francisco Giants
**Roster**
**Pitchers**: 41 Jeremy Affeldt; 40 Madison Bumgarner; 18 Matt Cain; 46 Santiago Casilla; 61,65 Steve Edlefsen; 60 Waldis Joaquín; 55 Tim Lincecum; 49 Javier López; 59 Guillermo Mota; 52 Ramón Ramírez; 54 Sergio Romo; 45 Dan Runzler; 57 Jonathan Sánchez; 47 Eric Surkamp; 32 Ryan Vogelsong; 38 Brian Wilson; 75 Barry Zito	**Catchers**: 28 Buster Posey; 29 Héctor Sánchez; 37 Chris Stewart; 22 Eli Whiteside; **Infielders**: 2 Emmanuel Burriss; 6,43 Orlando Cabrera; 35 Brandon Crawford; 7 Mark DeRosa; 14 Mike Fontenot; 50 Conor Gillaspie; 29,6 Bill Hall; 17 Aubrey Huff; 8 Jeff Keppinger; 6 Brett Pill; 21 Freddy Sanchez; 48 Pablo Sandoval; 10 Miguel Tejada	**Outfielders**: 9 Brandon Belt; 15 Carlos Beltrán; 5 Pat Burrell; 51,70 Justin Christian; 34 Darren Ford; 13 Cody Ross; 33 Aaron Rowand; 12 Nate Schierholtz; 56 Andrés Torres; **Other batters**: 29 Ryan Rohlinger	**Manager**: 15,16 Bruce Bochy; **Coaches**: 1 Tim Flannery (third base); 26 Mark Gardner (bullpen); 58 Bill Hayes (bullpen catcher); 39 Roberto Kelly (first base); 31 Hensley Meulens (hitting); 19 Dave Righetti (pitching); 23 Ron Wotus (bench)

== Regular season stats ==
=== Batting ===
Note: G = Games played; AB = At bats; R = Runs scored; H = Hits; 2B = Doubles; 3B = Triples; HR = Home runs; RBI = Runs batted in; AVG = Batting average; SB = Stolen bases

Player	G	AB	R	H	2B	3B	HR	RBI	AVG	SB
Eli Whiteside	82	213	14	42	8	2	4	17	.197	2
Aubrey Huff	150	521	45	128	27	1	12	59	.246	5
Freddy Sanchez	60	239	21	69	15	1	3	24	.289	0
Brandon Crawford	66	196	22	40	5	2	3	21	.204	1
Pablo Sandoval	117	426	55	134	26	3	23	70	.315	2
Cody Ross	121	405	54	97	25	0	14	52	.240	5
Andrés Torres	112	348	50	77	24	1	4	19	.221	19
Nate Schierholtz	115	335	42	93	22	1	9	41	.278	7
Aaron Rowand	108	331	34	77	22	2	4	21	.233	2
Miguel Tejeda	91	322	28	77	16	0	4	26	.239	4
Mike Fontenot	85	220	22	50	15	3	4	21	.227	5
Jeff Keppinger	56	216	17	55	11	0	2	15	.255	0
Brandon Belt	63	187	21	42	6	1	9	18	.225	3
Pat Burrell	92	183	17	42	9	1	7	21	.230	0
Carlos Beltrán	44	167	17	54	9	4	7	18	.323	1
Buster Posey	45	162	17	46	5	0	4	21	.284	3
Chris Stewart	67	162	20	33	8	0	3	10	.204	0
Emmanuel Burriss	59	137	14	28	1	0	0	4	.204	11
Orlando Cabrera	39	126	4	28	3	0	1	13	.222	2
Mark Derosa	47	86	9	24	2	0	0	12	.279	1
Brett Pill	15	50	7	15	3	2	2	9	.300	0
Justin Christian	18	47	6	12	5	0	0	4	.255	3
Bill Hall	16	38	6	6	2	0	0	1	.158	2
Héctor Sánchez	13	31	0	8	2	0	0	1	.258	0
Conor Gillaspie	15	19	2	5	0	0	1	2	.263	0
Darren Ford	26	14	7	4	0	0	0	0	.286	7
Ryan Rohlinger	1	1	0	0	0	0	0	0	.000	0
Pitcher totals	162	304	19	41	11	0	1	14	.135	0
Team totals	162	5486	570	1327	282	24	121	534	.242	85

=== Pitching ===
Note: W = Wins; L = Losses; ERA = Earned run average; G = Games pitched; GS = Games started; SV = Saves; IP = Innings pitched; H = His allowed; R = Runs allowed; ER = Earned runs allowed; BB = Walks allowed; K = Strikeouts

Player	W	L	ERA	G	GS	SV	IP	H	R	ER	BB	K
Matt Cain	12	11	2.88	33	33	0	221.2	177	82	71	63	179
Tim Lincecum	13	14	2.74	33	33	0	217.0	176	74	66	86	220
Madison Bumgarner	13	13	3.21	33	33	0	204.2	202	82	73	46	191
Ryan Vogelsong	13	7	2.71	30	28	0	179.2	164	62	54	61	139
Jonathan Sánchez	4	7	4.26	19	19	0	101.1	80	54	48	66	102
Guillermo Mota	2	2	3.81	52	0	1	80.1	71	34	34	30	77
Ramón Ramírez	3	3	2.62	66	0	4	68.2	54	24	20	26	66
Jeremy Affeldt	3	2	2.63	67	0	3	61.2	47	22	18	24	54
Brian Wilson	6	4	3.11	57	0	36	55.0	50	20	19	31	54
Barry Zito	3	4	5.87	13	9	0	53.2	51	35	35	24	32
Javier López	5	2	2.72	70	0	1	53.0	42	16	16	26	40
Santiago Casilla	2	2	1.74	49	0	6	51.2	33	11	10	25	45
Sergio Romo	3	1	1.50	65	0	1	48.0	29	8	8	5	70
Dan Runzler	1	2	6.26	31	1	0	27.1	29	21	19	16	25
Eric Surkamp	2	2	5.74	6	6	0	26.2	32	18	17	17	13
Steve Edlefsen	0	0	9.53	13	0	0	11.1	17	12	12	10	6
Waldis Joaquín	1	0	4.26	5	0	0	6.1	6	3	3	3	3
Team totals	86	76	3.20	162	162	52	1468.0	1260	578	522	559	1316

== Farm system ==
Level	Team	League	Manager
AAA	Fresno Grizzlies	Pacific Coast League	Steve Decker
AA	Richmond Flying Squirrels	Eastern League	Dave Machemer
A	San Jose Giants	California League	Andy Skeels
A	Augusta GreenJackets	South Atlantic League	Lipso Nava
A-Short Season	Salem-Keizer Volcanoes	Northwest League	Tom Trebelhorn
Rookie	AZL Giants	Arizona League	Mike Goff

== See also ==
- The Franchise
