= Joe Paterson (baseball) =

American baseball player (born 1986)

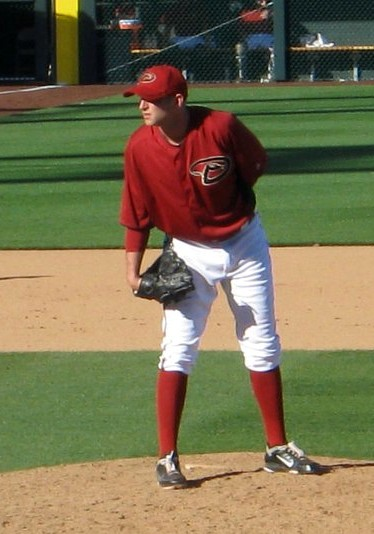
- Paterson with the Arizona Diamondbacks
- Pitcher
- Born: May 19, 1986 (age 40); McMinnville, Oregon, U.S.
- Batted: Right Threw: Left

MLB debut
- April 2, 2011, for the Arizona Diamondbacks

Last appearance
- September 19, 2014, for the Arizona Diamondbacks

MLB statistics
- Win–loss record: 0–3
- Earned run average: 6.25
- Strikeouts: 30
- Stats at Baseball Reference

Teams
- Arizona Diamondbacks (2011–2014)

Joseph Michael Paterson (born May 19, 1986) is an American former professional baseball pitcher. He played in Major League Baseball (MLB) for the Arizona Diamondbacks.

== College career and minor leagues ==
After graduating from McMinnville High School in McMinnville, Oregon, Paterson started his college career at Linfield College in 2005 and then transferred to Oregon State for his sophomore and junior seasons. Paterson played for the 2006 and 2007 Oregon State Beavers baseball teams. In 2006, he played collegiate summer baseball with the Falmouth Commodores of the Cape Cod Baseball League. In 2007, he was pitching and recorded the final out over the University of North Carolina to win the 2007 NCAA College World Series.

Paterson was drafted by the San Francisco Giants in the 10th round of the 2007 Major League Baseball draft. After signing, he made 13 relief appearances for AZL Giants and Short-Season Salem-Keizer Volcanoes in his first minor league season. In 2008 Paterson made 54 relief outings for Class A Augusta and Class A Advanced San Jose. In 2009, he was an Eastern League All-Star after a solid season with the AA Connecticut Defenders and after finishing a successful 2010 campaign for the AAA Fresno Grizzlies of the Pacific Coast League, Paterson was selected by the Giants to play for the Scottsdale Scorpions in the Arizona Fall League.

== Professional career ==
=== Arizona Diamondbacks ===
During the 2010–11 offseason, Paterson was selected by the Arizona Diamondbacks in the first round of the 2010 Rule 5 Draft (third overall pick). Paterson made the Diamondbacks' 2011 Opening Day 25 man roster as a middle relief pitcher. He made his MLB debut on April 2, 2011, in Denver, Colorado against the Rockies where he faced two batters without giving up a run in the 8th inning. Paterson would not give up a single run until a May 21 game against the Minnesota Twins. Paterson would earn his first career loss in a June 5 game against the Washington Nationals. He would give up three hits and two walks only then to give up five earned runs in just one inning. He wound up pitching in 62 games for the D'Backs in 2011, registering a 2.91 ERA.

From 2012 to 2014, Paterson only appeared in a total of 11 games for the Diamondbacks, pitching mostly in the minors throughout those seasons.

Paterson was outrighted off the Diamondbacks roster on October 7, 2014.

=== Kansas City Royals ===
Paterson signed a minor league deal with the Kansas City Royals on November 12, 2014. He was released in May 2015.

=== Oakland Athletics ===
He was signed to a minor league contract with the Oakland Athletics on May 25, 2015. Paterson was released on June 11.

=== Cincinnati Reds ===
On June 20, 2015, Paterson signed a minor league deal with the Cincinnati Reds. He was released on July 16, 2015.

== See also ==
- Rule 5 draft results
