= Dan Runzler =

American baseball player (born 1985)

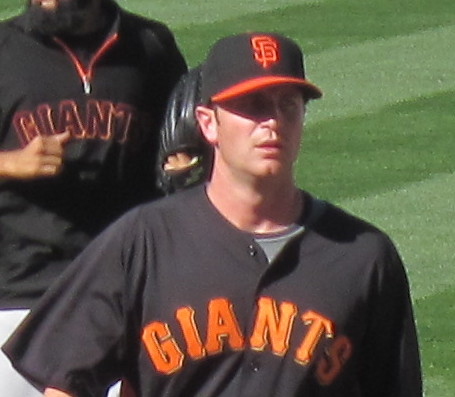
- Runzler with the San Francisco Giants on Opening Day in 2011
- Pitcher
- Born: March 30, 1985 (age 41); Santa Monica, California, U.S.
- Batted: Left Threw: Left

MLB debut
- September 4, 2009, for the San Francisco Giants

Last MLB appearance
- October 1, 2017, for the Pittsburgh Pirates

MLB statistics
- Win–loss record: 4–2
- Earned run average: 3.89
- Strikeouts: 82
- Stats at Baseball Reference

Teams
- San Francisco Giants (2009–2012); Pittsburgh Pirates (2017)

Career highlights and awards
- World Series champion (2010)

Daniel Joseph Runzler (born March 30, 1985) is an American former professional baseball pitcher who is the pitching coach for the Low-A San Jose Giants of the San Francisco Giants organization. He played in Major League Baseball (MLB) for the Giants from 2009 to 2012 and the Pittsburgh Pirates in 2017.

Born in Santa Monica, California, on March 30, 1985, Runzler attended the University of California, Riverside. A pitcher for the Highlanders, he was twice drafted, first by the Seattle Mariners in 2006, then by the Giants in 2007 after moving from the starting rotation to the bullpen. He signed with the Giants and made his MLB debut in 2009, posting a 1.04 earned run average (ERA) in 11 games. During the Giants' 2010 World Series season, he pitched in a career-high 41 games, posting a 3–0 record with an ERA of 3.03, though the second half of his season was interrupted by a fractured patella. In 2011, the Giants experimented with using him as a starting pitcher, but he posted a 6.26 ERA and spent much of the season in the minor leagues. An injured lat muscle cost him the first two months of 2012, and he only pitched in six games for the Giants in the 2012 season, when they won their second World Series during his time with the club. He did not pitch for San Francisco in 2013 and 2014, pitching in the minor leagues until halfway through the 2014 season, when he went to Japan and joined the Orix Buffaloes' secondary affiliate for the rest of the year.

Runzler returned to the United States in 2015, pitching in the minor leagues with various organizations until the Pirates added him to their roster in September 2017. He pitched in eight games for them, then spent the next two years in the minor leagues. In 2021, he accepted a job as the director of pitching development for Sirious Baseball, a youth and high school baseball training organization, and also became the pitching coach for the Milkmen.

== Early years ==
Daniel Joseph Runzler was born on March 30, 1985, in Santa Monica, California. He attended Chaminade College Preparatory School in the San Fernando Valley, where he played baseball. Originally, he played first base and right field for Chaminade. Not excelling at either position, he was the only junior ballplayer at Chaminade that had not reached the varsity team. Former Major League Baseball (MLB) player Mark Gubicza took over as Chaminade's varsity coach in 2003 when Runzler was a senior, and Gubicza added Runzler to the varsity team–though as a pitcher. Runzler underwent a growth spurt in high school, rising from 5 feet 6 inches (1.68 m) as a freshman to 6 feet 4 inches (1.93 m) by the time he graduated.

Runzler attended the University of California, Riverside, where he served as a starting pitcher for the Highlanders. Eligible for the 2006 MLB draft after his sophomore season, he was selected by the Seattle Mariners in the 17th round (501st overall) but did not sign. That summer, he played collegiate summer baseball with the Cotuit Kettleers of the Cape Cod Baseball League. On August 1, he entered a game against the Chatham Athletics in the sixth inning with the bases loaded, two outs, and the Kettleers clinging to a 1–0 lead. Runzler struck out Doug Pickens, ending the threat and preserving the lead in an eventual 2–1 victory that clinched the Western Division title for Cotuit. As a junior in 2007, Runzler experienced greater success serving as a relief pitcher. During the Tempe Super Regional, on June 3, 2007, Runzler hit a batter with a pitch with the bases loaded to allow an inherited runner to score, then allowed three runs of his own (though they were all unearned) in an 11–1 loss to the Nebraska Cornhuskers that eliminated the Highlanders from tournament play. In the 2007 MLB draft, he was selected by the San Francisco Giants in the 9th round (284th overall). He chose to sign with the Giants on June 18.

== Professional career ==
=== San Francisco Giants ===
==== Minor leagues (2007–09) ====
Runzler spent most of the 2007 season with the Rookie-level Arizona League Giants. In 15 games, he had a 1–2 record, a 3.44 earned run average (ERA), 24 strikeouts, six walks, and 15 hits allowed in 18 1/3 innings pitched. He also appeared in one game for the Single-A short season Salem-Keizer Volcanoes of the Northwest League, allowing one run in one inning of work.

In 2008, Runzler started the season with the Single-A Augusta Greenjackets of the South Atlantic League (SAL) but struggled. In 20 games, he had an 0–1 record, a 5.47 ERA, 26 strikeouts, 19 walks, and 25 hits allowed in 24 2/3 innings before getting demoted to Salem-Keizer in midseason. In 27 games for the Volcanoes, he had an 0–1 record, a 2.10 ERA, 43 strikeouts, 21 walks, and 19 hits allowed in 30 innings. Runzler pitched through a stress fracture in his right foot during the latter part of the 2008 season, and he arrived at spring training early to help get himself in shape for the 2009 season.

Runzler played for four different teams within the Giants farm system in 2009. He began the season with Augusta, where pitching coach Steve Kline helped him refine his pitching mechanics and focus more on throwing pitches in the strike zone. He earned a spot on the SAL mid-season All-Star team but did not participate in the game because he was promoted to the Single-A advanced San Jose Giants in the California League on June 8. He did not allow a run in his first 15 games with San Jose; combined with his last appearances with Augusta, Runzler threw 32 2/3 consecutive scoreless innings. Runzler pitched in 19 games with San Jose before moving up to the Double-A Connecticut Defenders in the Eastern League. After seven appearances for them, he was promoted to the Triple-A Fresno Grizzlies in the Pacific Coast League (PCL), with whom he threw two scoreless innings before being called up to the Giants in September when rosters expanded. In 47 games across the four minor league levels, he had a 3–1 record, an 0.76 ERA, 83 strikeouts, 24 walks, and 23 hits allowed in 59 innings. For his efforts in the minor leagues, he was named the 2009 This Year in Minor League Baseball Awards Overall Reliever of the Year.

==== Major leagues (2009–12) ====
On September 4, 2009, Runzler made his MLB debut against the Milwaukee Brewers, striking out center fielder Jody Gerut on three pitches. With that appearance, Runzler became the first player in Giants' history to play minor league baseball at four levels and appear in the major leagues in the same season. Runzler appeared in 11 games with San Francisco in 2009, striking out 11 batters in eight innings with an ERA of 1.04. He did not allow a run until his final outing of the year, on October 2, when Henry Blanco of the San Diego Padres hit a solo home run against him.

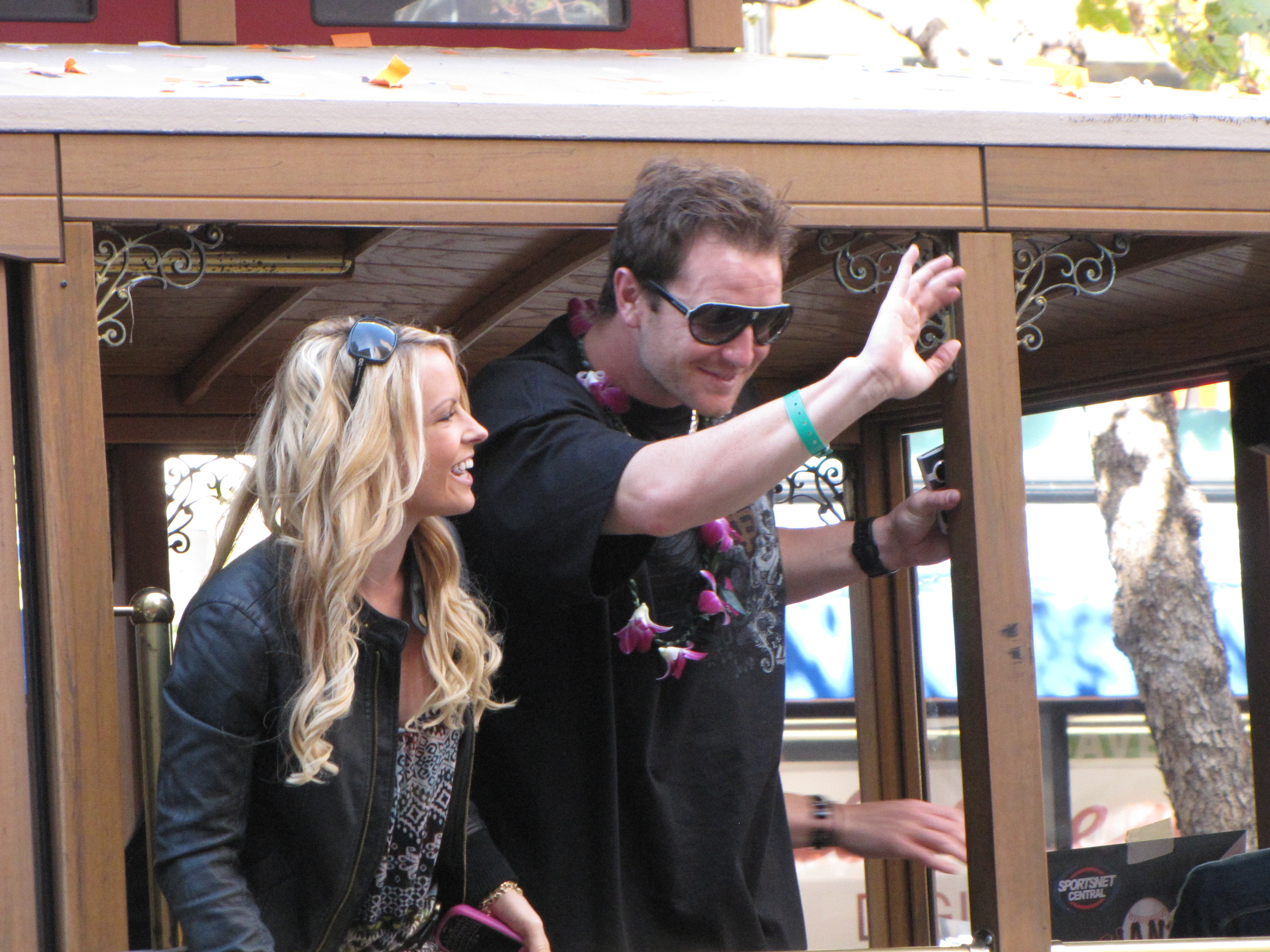
Runzler in the Giants' 2010 World Series victory parade

Ranked the fifth-best prospect in the Giants organization by Baseball America in 2010, Runzler made the Opening Day roster for the first time in his career. He got his first major league win on May 4, pitching a scoreless 11th inning and striking out three in a 12-inning, 9–6 victory over the Florida Marlins. He had a 5.00 ERA through May 26, but in his next 16 games through July 8, Runzler allowed just one earned run. In the July 8 contest, against the Brewers, Runzler entered the game with one out in the sixth, the bases loaded, and San Francisco clinging to a 6–3 lead. He got through the inning without allowing any runs to score, then received a chance to have his first MLB at bat in the bottom of the inning, as manager Bruce Bochy wanted him to pitch in the seventh inning as well. Facing David Riske, Runzler fouled a ball off his knee. Unable to finish the at bat, he was placed on the disabled list with a fractured left patella. He returned in September and made five more appearances, allowing no runs. In 41 games, he had a 3–0 record, a 3.03 ERA, 37 strikeouts, 20 walks, and 29 hits allowed in 32 2/3 innings. He was left off the playoff roster as the Giants won the 2010 World Series, their first series triumph since 1954.

Runzler began the 2011 season with the Giants but struggled, posting a 6.41 ERA in his first 18 games. On May 28, he was optioned to Fresno to make room for Casilla, who was activated from the disabled list. While he was in Fresno, the Giants used him as a starting pitcher, though sportswriter Andrew Baggarly thought the move was a temporary one meant to get him more time on the mound. On August 16, Runzler was recalled when Sergio Romo was placed on the disabled list. Runzler was called on to make a spot start on August 21 after Jonathan Sánchez was injured. He gave up four runs in only 1 2/3 innings against the Houston Astros, but the Giants ultimately won 6–4 in 11 innings. Afterwards, Eric Surkamp was called up to join the rotation. Both pitchers were sent to Fresno on August 28 to make room for Romo and Andrés Torres to return from the disabled list, but they were recalled on September 6 after rosters had expanded. In 17 games (10 starts) for Fresno, Runzler had a 2–3 record, a 3.98 ERA, 59 strikeouts, 32 walks, and 47 walks in 52 innings. He did not allow a run in 11 September appearances with San Francisco, lowering his ERA by 1.51. Runzler exited the final game of the season on September 28 with what was later diagnosed as a torn latissimus dorsi muscle. In 31 games, he had a 1–2 record, a 6.26 ERA, 25 strikeouts, 16 walks, and 29 hits allowed in 27 1/3 innings pitched.

After aggravating his lat muscle injury during the first week of spring training in 2012, Runzler began the season on the disabled list. Runzler consulted sports physician James Andrews, who determined that surgery for the injury was unnecessary. He rehabilitated in extended spring training and with San Jose before being activated from the disabled list and assigned to Fresno on June 27. In 29 games for Fresno, Runzler had an 0–2 record, a 6.00 ERA, 33 strikeouts, 14 walks, and 36 hits allowed in 27 innings. He was called up on September 4 after rosters expanded. He pitched in six games without allowing a run, striking out five, walking three, and allowing one hit in 3 2/3 innings. Runzler was not on the postseason roster as the Giants won the 2012 World Series, their second in three years. After the season, Runzler pitched for the Scottsdale Scorpions of the Arizona Fall League. In 10 games, he had a 1–1 record, a 3.38 ERA, 11 strikeouts, seven walks, and six hits allowed in eight innings.

==== Minor leagues (2013–14) ====
An unlikely candidate to make the Giants roster in 2013, as San Francisco had three other left-handed relievers, Runzler was optioned to Fresno on March 24. In 51 games for the Grizzlies, he had a 3–7 record, a 5.68 ERA, 50 strikeouts, 37 walks, and 58 hits allowed in 52 1/3 innings. He was designated for assignment on September 3 and outrighted to the Grizzlies three days later.

Runzler was invited to spring training in 2014 but returned to Fresno to start the season. In 39 games, he had a 1–5 record, a 3.30 ERA, 53 strikeouts, 36 walks, and 38 hits allowed in 46 1/3 innings. He was released on July 30 so he could play for a team in Japan.

=== Orix Buffaloes ===
The same day as his release, Runzler signed with the Orix Buffaloes of Nippon Professional Baseball. Runzler did not appear with Orix's main club, but did appear in six games in the Japan Western League. He registered a 4.50 ERA with 10 strikeouts in 10 innings pitched.

=== Journeyman (2014–2016) ===
On December 16, 2014, Runzler signed a minor league contract with the Arizona Diamondbacks. In 39 games for the PCL's Reno Aces in 2015, he had an 0–1 record, a 5.26 ERA, 40 strikeouts, 28 walks, and 48 hits allowed in 37 2/3 innings. He was released on July 30.

Runzler signed a minor league contract with the Minnesota Twins that included an invitation to spring training on November 4, 2015. He began the 2016 season with the Triple-A Rochester Red Wings of the International League (IL). In 20 games, he had a 1–2 record, a 5.82 ERA, 18 strikeouts, 16 walks, and 24 hits allowed in 21 2/3 innings. On June 22, 2016, Runzler was released. He then signed with the Sugar Land Skeeters of the Atlantic League of Professional Baseball. In 33 games, he had an 0–1 record, a 1.95 ERA, 29 strikeouts, 10 walks, and 36 hits allowed in 27/3 innings.

=== Pittsburgh Pirates ===
Runzler signed a minor league deal with the Pittsburgh Pirates on December 1, 2016. He spent most of the year with the IN's Indianapolis Indians. In 40 games, he had a 1–4 record, a 3.05 ERA, 36 strikeouts, 22 walks, and 43 hits allowed in 41 1/3 innings. On September 10, the Pirates purchased his contract, returning him to the major leagues for the first time since 2012. He did not allow a run in his first six outings, then gave up two runs in 2/3 of an inning against the Washington Nationals on September 29. In Pittsburgh's last game of the year, on October 1, Runzler got two outs in the ninth and would have finished the inning, but an error by José Osuna allowed Wilmer Difo to reach, and Runzler gave up two runs before George Kontos entered to get the last out. Pittsburgh still won 11–8. In eight games for Pittsburgh, Runzler had no record, a 4.50 ERA, four strikeouts, two walks, and seven hits allowed in four innings pitched. He became a free agent on November 6.

=== Sugar Land Skeeters (second stint) ===
On February 5, 2018, Runzler signed a minor league contract with the Tampa Bay Rays. However, he was released on March 11. He spent the 2018 season with the Skeeters again. In 53 games, he had a 4–2 record, a 2.81 ERA, 58 strikeouts, 27 walks, and 46 hits allowed in 48 innings.

=== Boston Red Sox ===
Runzler signed a minor league contract with the Boston Red Sox on February 1, 2019. He was assigned to the Pawtucket Red Sox of the International League on April 3. In 22 games, he had a 1–1 record, a 5.40 ERA, 22 strikeouts, 15 walks, and 26 hits allowed in 26 2/3 innings pitched. Runzler was released by the Red Sox organization on July 15.

=== Sugar Land Skeeters (third stint) ===
On July 22, 2019, Runzler signed with the Sugar Land Skeeters for a third stint. In 16 games, he had a 1–0 record, a 1.15 ERA, 17 strikeouts, three walks, and 17 hits allowed in 15 2/3 innings pitched. Runzler became a free agent following the season.

On February 18, 2020, Runzler signed with the Sultanes de Monterrey of the Mexican League. However, the entire 2020 Mexican League season was cancelled because of the impact of COVID-19. On March 5, 2021, Runzler was released by the Sultanes.

== Coaching career ==
After the Sultanes released him, Runzler took a job with Sirious Baseball, a youth and high school baseball training organization in Campbell, California, as the director of pitching development. On April 9, 2021, Runzler was hired as the pitching coach for the Milwaukee Milkmen of the American Association of Independent Professional Baseball. He will continue to work with Sirious during the offseason.

On March 3, 2022, Runzler was hired as the pitching coach for the San Jose Giants, the Low-A affiliate of the San Francisco Giants, for the 2022 season.

== Career statistics and pitching style ==
Runzler pitched in the major leagues for parts of five seasons: four with the Giants (2009–12) and one with the Pirates (2017). In 97 games, he had a 4–2 record, a 3.89 ERA, 82 strikeouts, 46 walks, and 72 hits allowed in 76 1/3 innings pitched. The Giants experimented with using him as a starter in 2011, but only one of his MLB appearances was a start. The Giants won the World Series in two out of his four seasons with them, though he was not a part of the postseason roster either time.

Runzler's pitching repertoire consisted of a fastball, a slider, and a changeup. In 2009, he threw a curveball 3.2% of that time, but he stopped throwing it again until 2012, when he threw it 12.7% of the time. The fastball (75.5%) and slider (22.5%) were his main pitches, as he only threw the changeup 1% of the time during his career. His fastball, which reporter Andrew Baggarly described as "tantalizing," travelled in the mid-90 mph range (approximately 145 km/h). However, control problems prevented him from remaining in the major leagues.

== Personal life ==
On November 19, 2011, Runzler married Michelle Phalen, a sports reporter for KSBW-TV in Salinas, California. Originally from Scotts Valley, California, Michelle played tennis at Occidental College.
