= Javy Guerra (baseball, born 1985) =

American baseball player (born 1985)

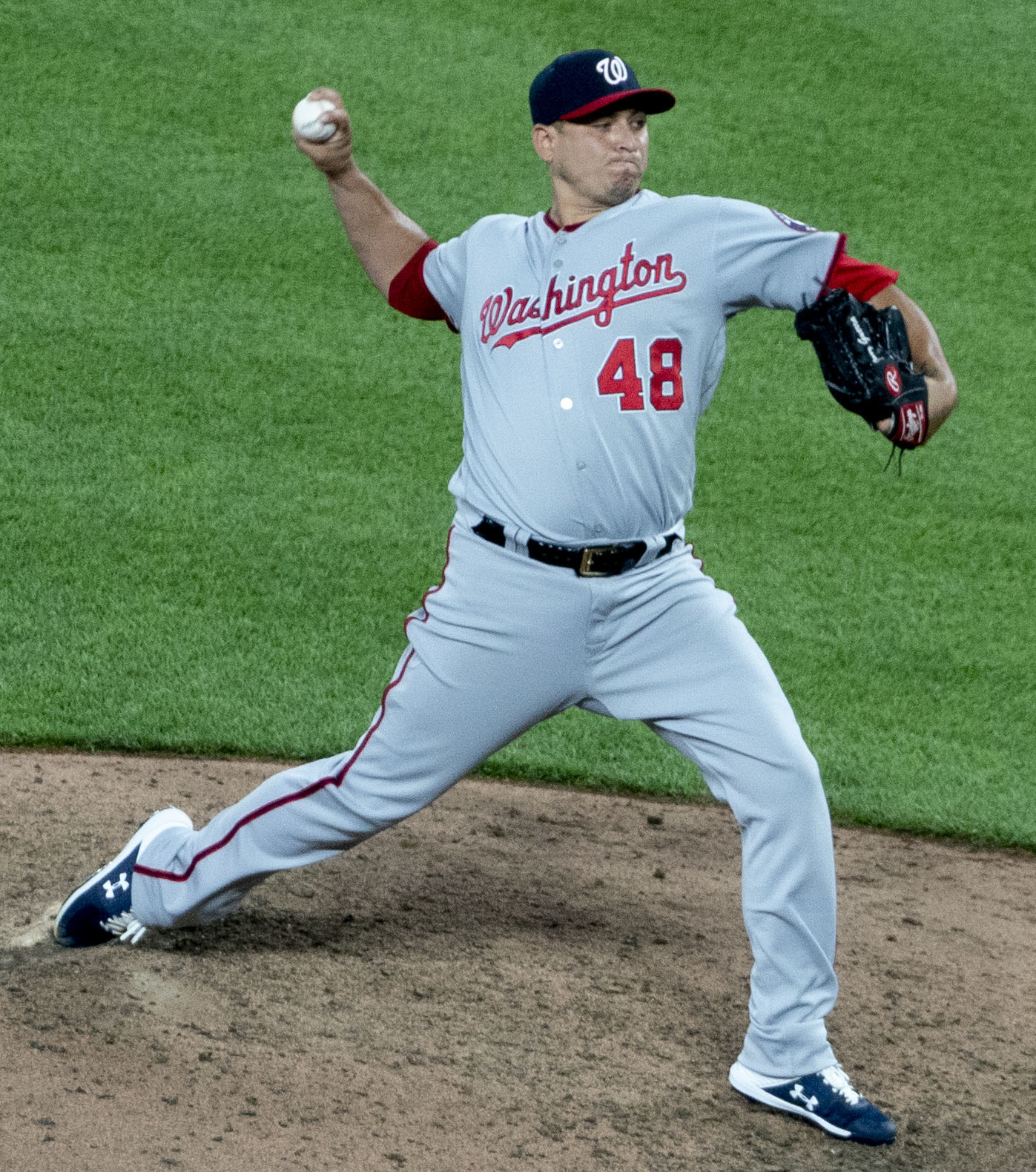
- Guerra with the Nationals in 2019

Athletics – No. 88
- Pitcher / Coach
- Born: October 31, 1985 (age 40); Denton, Texas, U.S.
- Batted: Right Threw: Right

MLB debut
- May 15, 2011, for the Los Angeles Dodgers

Last MLB appearance
- August 21, 2021, for the Washington Nationals

MLB statistics
- Win–loss record: 11–13
- Earned run average: 3.98
- Strikeouts: 245
- Stats at Baseball Reference

Teams
- As player: Los Angeles Dodgers (2011–2013); Chicago White Sox (2014–2015); Los Angeles Angels (2016); Miami Marlins (2017–2018); Toronto Blue Jays (2019); Washington Nationals (2019–2021); As coach: Athletics (2026–present)

Career highlights and awards
- World Series champion (2019)

Luis Javier Guerra (born October 31, 1985) is an American former professional baseball pitcher and current bullpen coach for the Athletics of Major League Baseball (MLB). Guerra was drafted in the fourth round of the 2004 MLB draft by the Los Angeles Dodgers. He made his MLB debut with the Dodgers in 2011. He also played in MLB for the Chicago White Sox, Los Angeles Angels, Miami Marlins, Toronto Blue Jays, and Washington Nationals. He won the 2019 World Series with the Nationals.

== Professional career ==
=== Los Angeles Dodgers ===
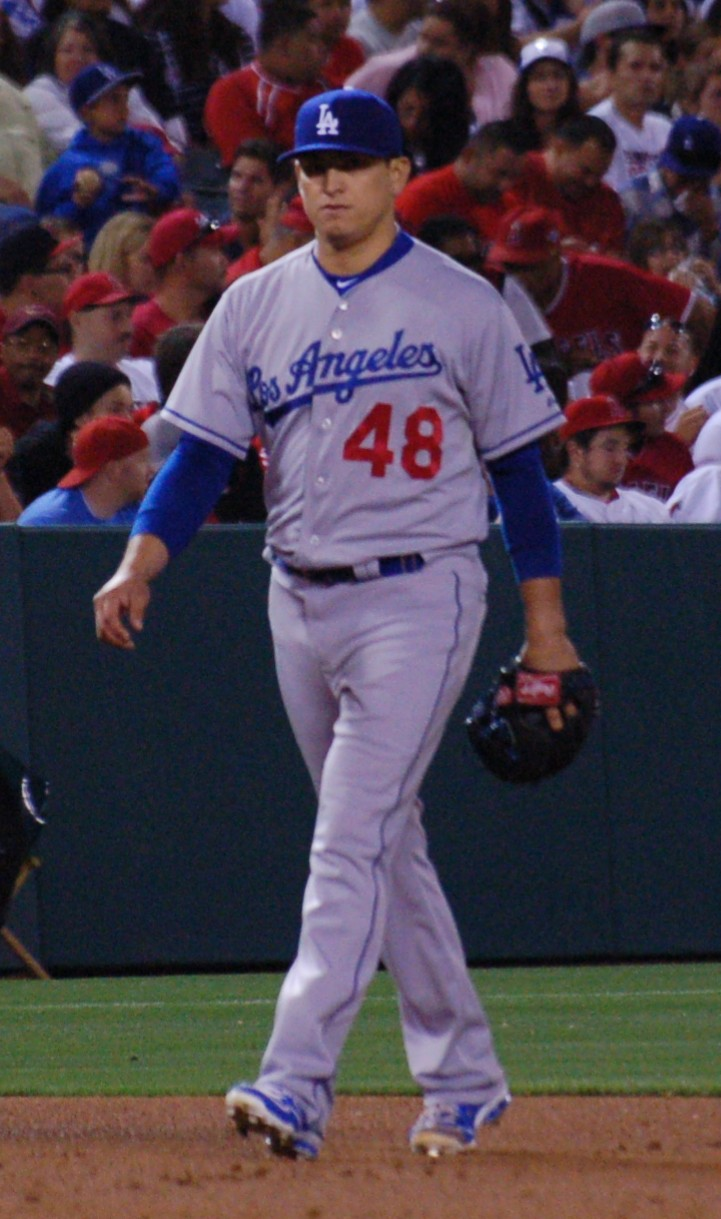
Guerra with the Los Angeles Dodgers in 2013

Guerra was drafted in the 4th round of the 2004 MLB draft by the Los Angeles Dodgers out of Billy Ryan High School in Denton, Texas. He is of Mexican descent.

In the Dodgers system he pitched for the Columbus Catfish in 2005, Ogden Raptors in 2006, Inland Empire 66ers of San Bernardino from 2007–2008 and split 2009 between the Great Lakes Loons and the Chattanooga Lookouts. He was selected to the Midwest League Mid-season All-Star team in 2009 and participated in the Arizona Fall League Rising Stars game. In 2010 with Chattanooga he had a 2.33 ERA in 28 games, despite missing a portion of the season due to injury. Following the season, he played for the Phoenix Desert Dogs in the Arizona Fall League. He returned to Chattanooga to start 2011.

Guerra was called up to the Dodgers on May 15, 2011 and made his debut in the ninth inning against the Arizona Diamondbacks, working a scoreless inning. On May 24 he was credited with his first career save by pitching a scoreless ninth inning against the Houston Astros. On June 4 he earned his first win by pitching the tenth inning and part of the eleventh, allowing one run in an 11-8 victory against the Cincinnati Reds; he also batted for himself and drew a base on balls. With Jonathan Broxton out for the year with injuries, Guerra became the Dodgers closer for most of the season. He finished with a 2-2 record, 2.31 ERA and 21 saves.

Guerra began 2012 as the Dodgers closer and picked up saves in his first five chances and seven of his first eight, but then he went through a period where he blew two of his next three opportunities and also pitched poorly in some non-save appearances. As a result, he was dropped from the closer role in favor of Kenley Jansen. He was later demoted to the Triple–A Albuquerque Isotopes in August. Guerra rejoined the Dodgers when rosters expanded in September, but suffered a strained oblique and was placed on the disabled list for the remainder of the season. Overall, he appeared in 45 games for the Dodgers in 2012, with a 2-3 record, 2.60 ERA and 8 saves.

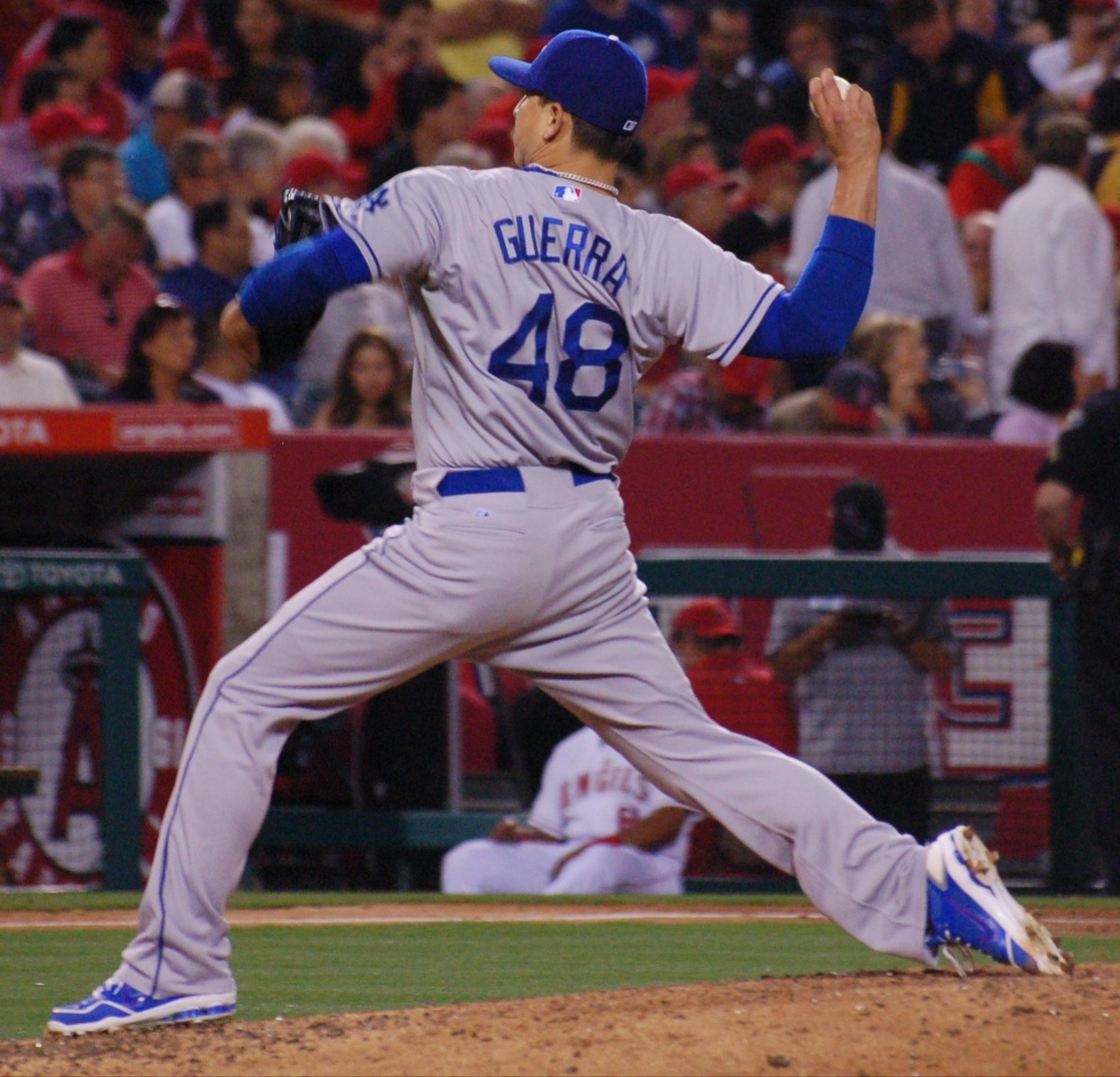
Guerra pitching for the Los Angeles Dodgers in 2013

On November 2, Guerra underwent arthroscopic right shoulder surgery, his third different surgery in 2012. He returned in time for spring training, but his injury kept him from participating in the 2013 World Baseball Classic. He also suffered a groin strain during spring training and the setback led to him falling behind the other relievers and he was optioned to Albuquerque to start the season. He spent the bulk of the season there, appearing in 27 games (including 4 as a starter) and was 0-4 with a 3.66 ERA and 12 saves. He also appeared in 9 games with the Dodgers in May and had an ERA of 6.75.

Guerra was designated for assignment by the Dodgers on March 16, 2014 and removed from the 40-man roster.

=== Chicago White Sox ===
The Chicago White Sox claimed him off waivers on March 26, 2014. On March 28, the White Sox outrighted him to the Triple–A Charlotte Knights. He was called up to the majors in May. Guerra was designated for assignment by the White Sox on May 6, 2015. On July 8, Guerra was suspended 50 games for drug abuse.

=== Los Angeles Angels ===
On February 10, 2016, Guerra signed a minor league contract with the Los Angeles Angels. He was designated for assignment on May 13. He was called back up by the Angels on June 1 and designated for assignment on June 7.

=== Miami Marlins ===
On December 17, 2016, Guerra signed a minor league contract with the Miami Marlins. On July 9, 2018, the Marlins selected Guerra's contract, adding him to their active roster. In 16 appearances for Miami, he posted a 1-1 record and 3.00 ERA with 12 strikeouts over 21 innings of work. On October 7, Guerra was removed from the 40-man roster and sent outright to the Triple–A New Orleans Baby Cakes.

Guerra re–signed with Miami to a minor league contract on January 13, 2018. Guerra had his contract selected on July 9, 2018. In 2018 with Miami he was 1-1 with one save and a 5.55 ERA in 32 relief appearances. Guerra was removed from the 40–man roster and declared free agency on October 12.

=== Toronto Blue Jays ===
On January 10, 2019, Guerra signed a minor league contract with the Toronto Blue Jays. On March 28, Guerra was added to the 25-man roster for Opening Day. He was designated for assignment on April 18 to make room for Ryan Tepera who was activated from the 10 day injured list. His contract was selected on May 10, and he was called up to the major league roster. He was designated for assignment again on May 18. With the Blue Jays in 2019 he was 0-0 with one save and a 3.86 ERA in 11 relief appearances.

=== Washington Nationals ===
Guerra was claimed off outright waivers by the Washington Nationals on May 20, 2019. He was designated for assignment on July 31. He had his contract selected for a second time on August 4. In 2019 with the Nationals he was 3-1 with one save and a 4.86 ERA in 40 relief appearances. Guerra pitched the ninth inning of Game 2 of the World Series, allowing a solo home run to Martín Maldonado in a 12-3 Nationals win over the Houston Astros. He was non-tendered by the Nationals on December 2, making him a free agent. To remain in the Nationals organization, Guerra subsequently signed a minor league deal with an invitation to major league spring training. On July 23, 2020, Guerra's contract was selected to the 40-man roster. On October 12, Guerra was outrighted off the roster and subsequently elected free agency. On December 21, Guerra re-signed with the Nationals organization on a minor league contract.

On August 3, 2021, Guerra's contract was selected by the Nationals, but he was again designated for assignment on August 22. In 6 games for the Nationals, Guerra struggled to a 16.50 ERA with 4 strikeouts. On August 22, Guerra was designated for assignment by the Nationals. On August 24, Guerra cleared waivers, but rejected his outright assignment and elected free agency.

=== Toros de Tijuana ===
On April 9, 2022, Guerra signed with the Toros de Tijuana of the Mexican League. He pitched in 31 games for Tijuana, posting a 2-2 record and 3.21 ERA with 31 strikeouts in 28 innings pitched.

Guerra made 43 relief appearances for Tijuana the following year, registering a 2–4 record and 5.77 ERA with 25 strikeouts across 34 1/3 innings pitched. He retired from professional baseball following the 2023 season.

== Coaching career ==
On February 5, 2025, the Athletics hired Guerra to serve as the pitching coach for their Double-A affiliate, the Midland RockHounds. On July 16, 2026, following the firing of Scott Emerson, he was promoted to be the major league bullpen coach.

== Pitching style ==
Guerra mostly throws a hard four-seam fastball (93–96 mph) and cutter (88–91), although he occasionally mixes in a curveball (78–80). He has even sprinkled in a small handful of sliders, changeups, and splitters — all in the mid-80s range.

== Personal life ==
Guerra was born in Denton, Texas. His mother and father were both born in Mexico, his mother lives in Denton, Texas and his father makes his home in Múzquiz, Coahuila. Guerra lives in Phoenix during the offseason.
