= Brian Wilson (baseball) =

American baseball player (born 1982)

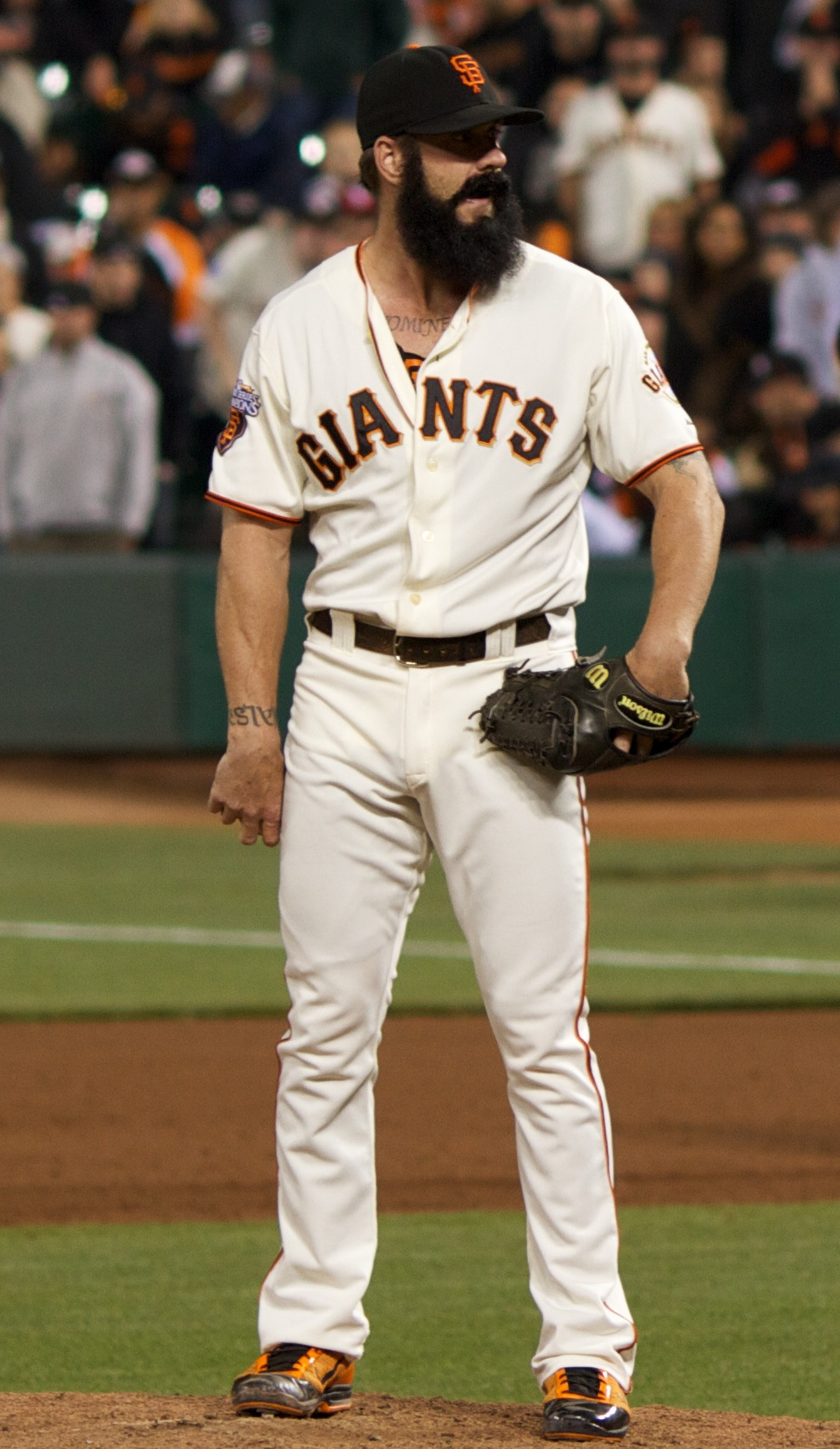
- Wilson with the Giants in 2011
- Pitcher
- Born: March 16, 1982 (age 44); Winchester, Massachusetts, U.S.
- Batted: Right Threw: Right

MLB debut
- April 23, 2006, for the San Francisco Giants

Last MLB appearance
- September 27, 2014, for the Los Angeles Dodgers

MLB statistics
- Win–loss record: 24–25
- Earned run average: 3.30
- Strikeouts: 407
- Saves: 172
- Stats at Baseball Reference

Teams
- San Francisco Giants (2006–2012); Los Angeles Dodgers (2013–2014)

Career highlights and awards
- 3× All-Star (2008, 2010, 2011); World Series champion (2010); NL saves leader (2010); San Francisco Giants Wall of Fame

Brian Patrick Wilson (born March 16, 1982), nicknamed "the Beard" and "B-Weezy", is an American former professional baseball relief pitcher. He played in Major League Baseball (MLB) for the San Francisco Giants and Los Angeles Dodgers. He stands 6 feet 1 inch (1.85 m) tall and weighs 205 pounds (93 kg). Wilson is known for his large black beard, which he began growing during the 2010 pennant race. Wilson's entrance at home games accompanied by the song "Jump Around" was popular with fans.

Wilson pitched collegiately at Louisiana State University. His college career ended during his junior season, when he injured his elbow and underwent Tommy John surgery. The San Francisco Giants selected him in the 2003 draft. He reached the major leagues in 2006 and had become the Giants' regular closer by the end of 2007. In 2010, he led the Majors with 48 saves, tying the franchise single-season record, while posting a 1.81 ERA, and he saved clinching games at every level of the playoffs, including the 2010 World Series over the Texas Rangers.

In the first week of the 2012 season, Wilson injured his elbow and subsequently underwent his second Tommy John surgery. He completed his recovery midway through the 2013 season and signed with the Los Angeles Dodgers, pitching effectively with them as a late-inning reliever through the playoffs. However, he was not able to continue his success in 2014, and the Dodgers released him after that season.

== Early life ==
Brian Patrick Wilson was born on March 16, 1982, in Winchester, Massachusetts. While he was in second grade, he moved to Londonderry, New Hampshire. Today, he talks little of his childhood except to discuss his father, Mike Wilson, who was an Air Force veteran and a demanding perfectionist. During fall, he would have Brian bag leaves and bury them in the woods; and in winter, he would have Brian spend seven hours shoveling snow on weekends. Brian said in a 2011 interview, "I think that's how you need to be raised. It's not your friend, it's your dad. And he's going to be strict. And one day you're going to understand why. And sometimes, it's a little too late. They might pass away, and you might not get that chance to say thanks or understand why you did those things. But when you become a man, you understand why."

When Wilson was 12 years old, his father was diagnosed with cancer. His father fought the disease for five years before dying while Wilson was attending Londonderry High School; Wilson today says he had to become a man when his father was diagnosed. In a 2011 story, ESPN.com writer Elizabeth Merrill said about Wilson's high school years, "He was an honor roll student at Londonderry, but clashed with various authority figures who didn't appreciate his occasional lack of a filter." In the same story, a number of Londonderry faculty speculated that some teachers didn't understand Wilson's life situation at the time. Art Psaledas, an assistant principal at the school, added, "It happened at probably the worst time anybody could lose your dad. Watching his dad deteriorate over the years was probably the singular thing that formed his personality."

Bob Napolitano, Wilson's coach at Londonderry High School, noticed Wilson's ability to concentrate on baseball. Napolitano specifically remembered the first home game of Wilson's senior year, which happened shortly after his father's death. No fewer than 29 professional scouts, all with radar guns, showed up to see him pitch. According to Napolitano, Wilson was completely oblivious to their appearance; he ate and drank in the dugout, warmed up, and pitched a two-hitter while apparently not noticing that scouts were there. The Cleveland Indians offered him a contract straight out of high school, but he did not sign, opting to attend college instead.

== College career ==
After a coach saw Wilson pitch well at a tournament in California, he was offered a scholarship to Louisiana State University (LSU), where he played for the LSU Tigers baseball team, eventually becoming their No. 2 starter. In his time at LSU, Wilson pitched in 51 games (22 starts) and accumulated 18 wins, 10 losses, and five saves. In 2002, he played collegiate summer baseball with the Hyannis Mets of the Cape Cod Baseball League. He was in the middle of his third season on March 28, 2003, when he injured his elbow and underwent Tommy John surgery. He also played for the Keene Swamp Bats of the New England Collegiate Baseball League, a summer league for collegiate prospects. Despite facing extensive rehabilitation, Wilson chose to enter the 2003 Major League Baseball draft.

== Professional career ==
=== Draft and minor leagues ===
Coming off his surgery, Wilson was drafted by the San Francisco Giants in the 24th round in 2003. He began his career with the Hagerstown Suns of the Class-A South Atlantic League in 2004. In 23 games, he had a 2–5 record, a 5.34 earned run average (ERA), 41 strikeouts, and 22 walks in 57 1/3 innings pitched. He made three starts that year, the only time he ever started games professionally. The Giants switched single-A affiliates the next year and Wilson began pitching for the Augusta GreenJackets. In 26 games, he had a 5–1 record, a 0.82 ERA, 30 strikeouts, and seven walks in 33 innings pitched while notching 13 saves, good for second in the league behind Brett Campbell's 19. His performance with Augusta caused Mark Camps of the San Francisco Chronicle to mention him in his "Minor Report" on May 15. He also pitched for the Norwich Navigators of the double-A Eastern League (posting no record, eight saves, a 0.57 ERA, 22 strikeouts, five walks, and 15 2/3 innings pitched in 15 games) and the Fresno Grizzlies of the Triple-A Pacific Coast League (posting a 1–1 record, no saves, a 3.97 ERA, 13 strikeouts, eight walks, and 11 1/3 innings pitched in nine games).

=== San Francisco Giants (2006–2012) ===
==== 2006 season ====
Wilson began 2006 with the Grizzlies before getting called up to the majors on April 23 to replace Tyler Walker, who was designated for assignment after struggling to begin the season. He made his major league debut that day in relief, pitching two innings, surrendering two hits and no runs while striking out three. He later revealed that he hurt himself during his first inning but continued pitching through the second without informing anyone of his injury. Afterward he was placed on the disabled list for a month. On May 23, he returned from the DL. He was optioned to Fresno on June 7 when Tim Worrell was activated from the DL; Giants' manager Felipe Alou said Wilson was not getting enough playing time. Wilson would go on to have three more stints with the Giants in 2006. On July 2, he got his first career save, stranding three inherited runners in the eighth inning and throwing 1 2/3 scoreless innings in a 6–2 victory over the San Diego Padres. In 31 games, he had a 2–3 record, a 5.40 ERA, 23 strikeouts, and 21 walks in 30 innings pitched. In 24 games with Fresno, he had a 1–3 record, a 2.89 ERA, 30 strikeouts, and 14 walks in 28 innings pitched.

==== 2007 season ====
Wilson competed for the closer role with Armando Benítez in 2007 spring training. After he struggled and posted a 7.71 ERA, the Giants optioned him to the minors to start the season. After building a 1–2 record, 2.10 ERA, 37 strikeouts, 24 walks, 11 saves, and 34 1/3 innings pitched in 31 games with Fresno, Wilson was called up on August 11 when Jonathan Sánchez was demoted. He was initially used as the setup man for closer Brad Hennessey, but he took over as closer on September 11 when Hennessey lost the role due to ineffectiveness. He went on to pitch in 24 games, recording a 1–2 record, a 2.28 ERA, 18 strikeouts, six walks, 23 2/3 innings pitched, and six saves.

==== 2008 season ====
Wilson remained the Giants' closer in 2008 and kept the role all season. He recorded 24 consecutive saves from May 3 through August 17, the longest streak by a Giant since Robb Nen had 28 straight in 2000. Wilson was named to the All-Star Game after leading the NL in saves with 25 in the first half of the season. He gave up no hits and struck out one in 2/3 innings in a 4–3 loss to the American League. He continued to lead the league in saves until José Valverde passed him at the end of August. Despite posting a 4.04 ERA through September 6, Wilson converted 37 of 40 save opportunities. In his final seven games of the year, however, he posted a 9.56 ERA while converting just four out of seven opportunities. In 63 games, he had a 3–2 record, a 4.62 ERA, 67 strikeouts, and 28 walks in 62 1/3 innings pitched. He converted 41 saves in 47 attempts; his 41 saves were tied with Brad Lidge's total for second in the league behind Valverde's 44.

==== 2009 season ====
On June 5, 2009, Wilson saved Randy Johnson's 300th win. Johnson, searching for his 300th win, gave up one unearned run in six innings in Game 1 of a doubleheader against the Washington Nationals; the Giants had a 2–1 lead in the eighth inning. With runners on first and second for the Nationals and two outs, Wilson was called on to get the save. He walked Ryan Zimmerman to load the bases and bring up Adam Dunn. He then loaded the count against Dunn before throwing a called strike three to end the inning. Wilson then pitched a scoreless ninth, preserving the victory for Johnson. On September 24, with two outs and two strikes in the ninth inning and the Giants leading the Chicago Cubs by a 2–1 score, Wilson gave up a two-run home run to Jeff Baker. The loss hurt the Giants' chances of reaching the playoffs. In 68 games, Wilson had a 5–6 record, a 2.74 ERA, 83 strikeouts, and 27 walks in 72 1/3 innings pitched. He blew seven saves, but his 38 saves tied for third in the NL with Ryan Franklin's total behind Heath Bell's 42 and Francisco Cordero's 39. He led the league in saves requiring four outs or more, with eight.

==== 2010 season ====
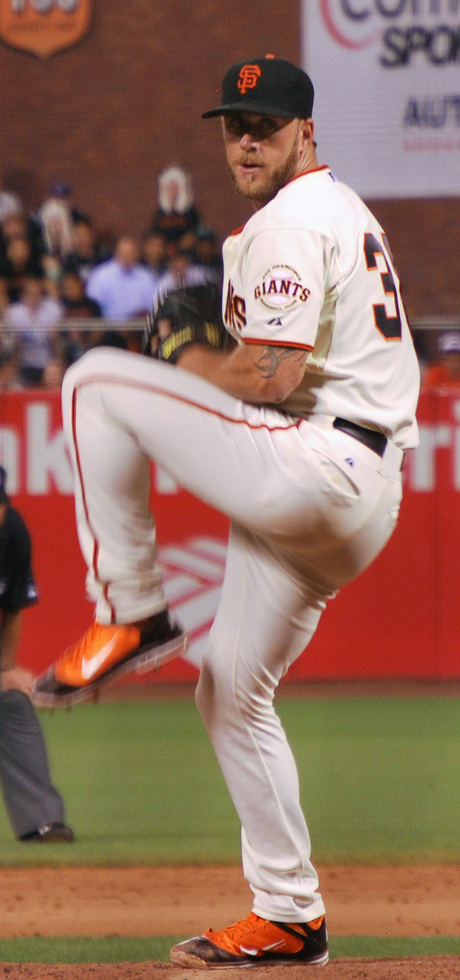
Brian Wilson, September 2010

In 2010 spring training, Wilson was asked whether or not he thought himself one of baseball's elite closers. In what would turn out to be a very prophetic quote, he replied:

An elite closer is a closer who's part of a World Series win. If you get that final out in the final win of the season, then you can consider yourself elite.

— MLB.com

On March 25, Wilson agreed to two-year, $15 million contract extension with the Giants. He struck out five batters in 1 2/3 innings on May 9 while recording a save in a 6–5 victory over the New York Mets. On May 15, against the Houston Astros with the bases loaded, two outs, and the Giants leading 2–1 in the ninth inning, Wilson struck out Kazuo Matsui in a 15-pitch at bat to end the game. The next day, against Houston with runners on first and second, two outs, and the Giants leading 4–3 in the ninth, Wilson retired Matsui to end the game. On June 12, Wilson entered in the eighth inning with one out, the bases loaded, and the Giants leading the Oakland Athletics 5–4. Wilson struck out Adam Rosales and retired Rajai Davis to end the inning; he then pitched a scoreless ninth to earn the save. He recorded 22 saves in his first 24 chances and was named to the All-Star Game in which he threw a scoreless eighth inning in the contest, a 3–1 victory over the AL. On October 3 (the final day of the regular season), the Giants faced the Padres, whom they led by one game in the NL West. Wilson threw a scoreless inning to earn the save and clinch the division for the Giants. Wilson converted his 48th save that day, tying the Giants' single season save record of 48 held by Rod Beck. He finished the season with a 3–3 record, a 1.81 ERA, 93 strikeouts, 26 walks, and 74 2/3 inning pitched in 70 games. He converted 48 of 53 save opportunities and led the majors in saves as well as leading the major leagues in saves of four outs or more (10). He was named the This Year in Baseball Closer of the Year after the season. He finished 13th in NL Most Valuable Player (MVP) voting.

==== 2010 postseason ====
Wilson made his playoff debut in Game 2 of the NL Division Series against the Atlanta Braves; he blew a save, but that was partly because of an error by Pablo Sandoval. He earned saves in Games 3 and 4 as the Giants defeated the Braves in four games. In the NL Championship Series, the Giants faced the Philadelphia Phillies. In Game 4, Wilson threw a scoreless inning and earned the win in the 6–5 victory. In Game 6, Wilson entered with one out in the eighth inning, runners on first and second, and the Giants leading 3–2. He got Carlos Ruiz to line into a double play. He then pitched the ninth inning, striking out Ryan Howard with two runners on base, clinching the series for the Giants. He joined Dennis Eckersley, Mitch Williams, and John Wetteland as the only pitchers since 1969 to win or save four games in a postseason series. (In 2014 Greg Holland of Kansas City matched this feat.)

The Giants faced the Texas Rangers in the World Series. Wilson appeared in three games, allowing no runs. He recorded the save in the series-clinching Game 5 as the Giants won their first World Series since 1954.

==== 2011 season ====
"And then there's the guy with the beard. Where's he? I do fear it. Have you guys seen the SportsCenter ad where it's, ESPN, where it starts doing a dance? Now, underneath Brian's beard, and the spandex tuxedo, and the sea captain costume, and the cleats with his face on them, is also one of the most dominant closers in baseball. And I do think, Brian, you should know that Michelle was very relieved that the press was going to be talking about what somebody else wears here in the White House, so that it's not just her making a fashion statement."

— President of the United States Barack Obama remarks on Wilson

Wilson strained an oblique muscle in 2011 spring training and opened the season on the DL. He was activated from the DL on April 6. After posting a 3.75 ERA in his first two games, Wilson posted a 1.26 ERA in his next 35 outings. During a game against the Detroit Tigers on July 1, Wilson blew a save for a second straight game and was taken out of the game by Bruce Bochy. Upon entering the dugout, Wilson took out his frustrations by throwing a Gatorade cooler and smashing it with a bat. The Giants still won the game 4–3 as Jeremy Affeldt got the save. Wilson was elected to his third All-Star Game; he earned the save in a 5–1 victory over the AL.

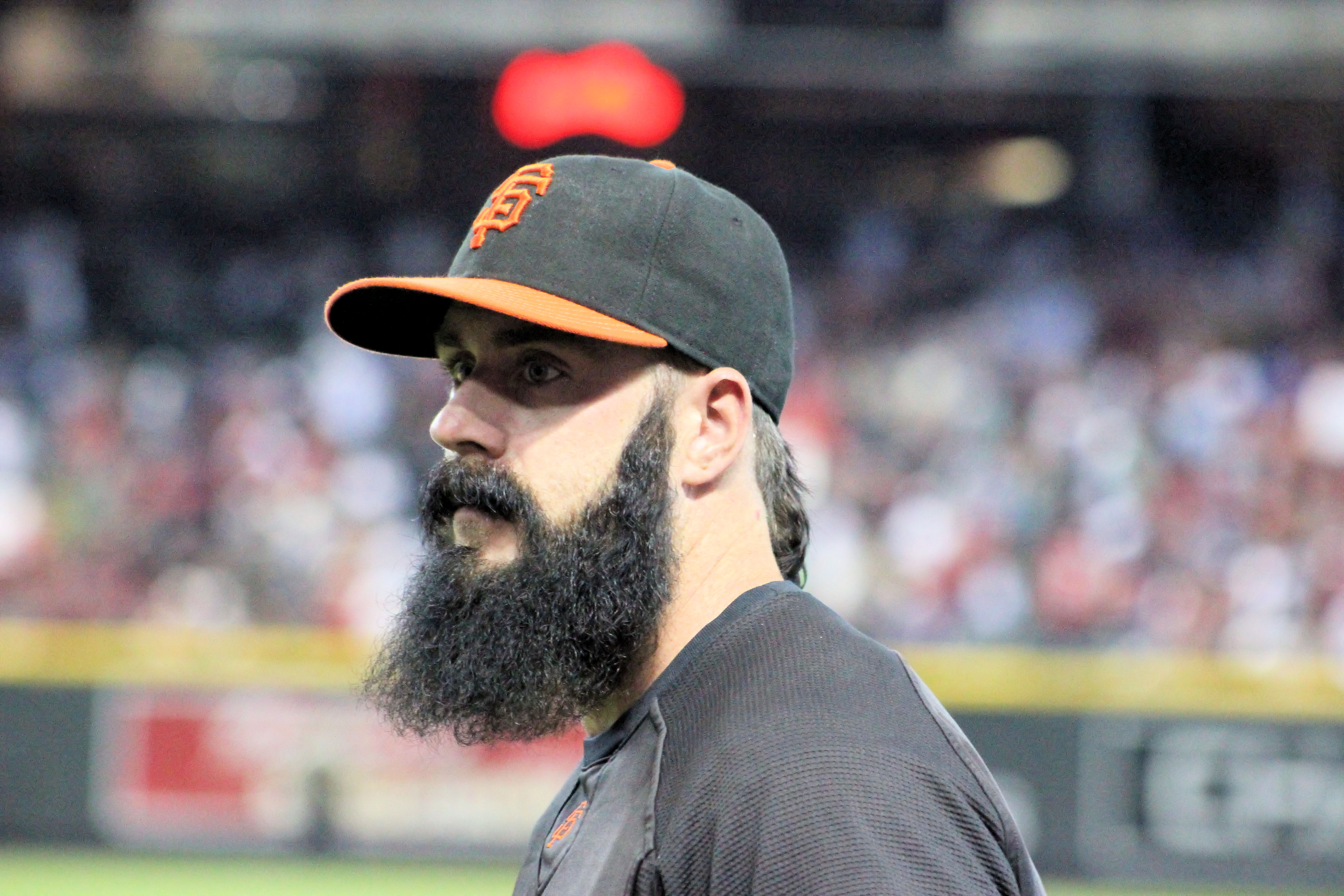
Wilson in September 2011

Wilson was placed on the DL on August 21 due to inflammation in his right elbow. At the time of his injury, he was third in the NL in saves, behind Craig Kimbrel and John Axford. On September 18, the Giants reactivated him from the DL. After two games back, Bochy decided to shut down Wilson for the final two games of the season. In 57 games, he had a 6–4 record, a 3.11 ERA, 54 strikeouts, and 31 walks in 55 innings pitched. He converted 36 of his 41 save opportunities, which tied Juan Carlos Oviedo for eighth in the NL.

==== 2012 season ====
Wilson's 2012 season would be short-lived. With the Giants leading the Colorado Rockies 4–1 entering the bottom of the ninth inning on April 12, he made his second appearance of the season to get the save for the Giants. He walked in a run to make it 4–2, but retired Marco Scutaro with the bases loaded to earn the save. He injured his elbow during the game and underwent Tommy John surgery for the second time in his career on April 19, causing him to miss the remainder of the season. During his injury shortened season, Wilson made only 2 appearances with an ERA of 9.00 and 1 save. The Giants went on to win their second World Series in three years. Wilson expressed confidence in an interview on April 15 that he would return to the Giants in 2013. However, because he was coming off an injury and would be owed at least $6.8 million for 2013, he was non-tendered after the season, which made him a free agent for the first time in his career. At the end of the 2012 season, he ranked third all-time in saves as a Giant with 171, behind only Robb Nen (206) and Rod Beck (199).

After his playing career ended, Wilson was inducted into the Giants Wall of Fame in 2018.

=== Los Angeles Dodgers (2013–2014) ===
Wilson chose not to sign with any team before the 2013 season because he wanted to be fully recovered from surgery when he attempted his comeback. On July 25, he threw a bullpen session for several teams' scouts, hoping to sign with a contender.

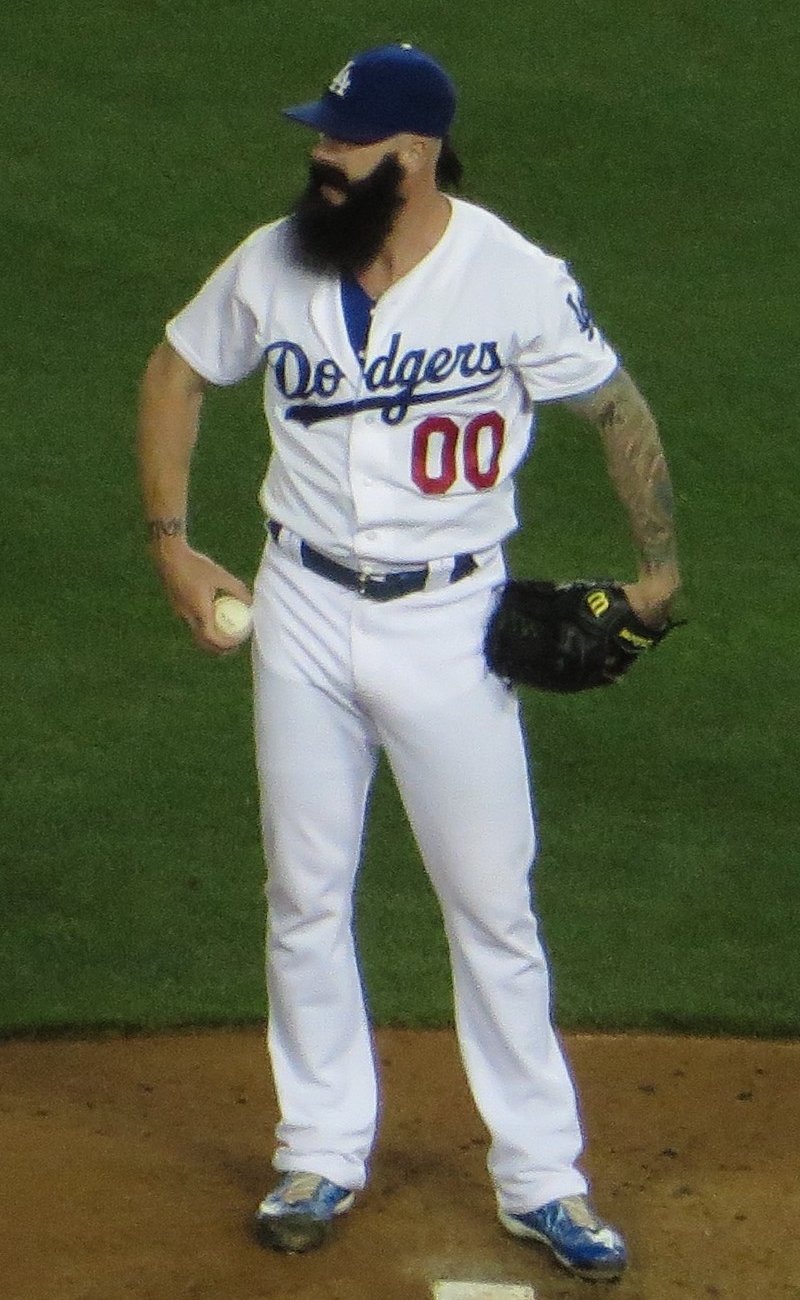
Wilson during his tenure with the Los Angeles Dodgers in 2014

On July 30, 2013, Wilson agreed to a contract with the Los Angeles Dodgers for the remainder of the 2013 season. After a few weeks at the Dodgers training facility in Arizona, he began a minor league rehab assignment.

Wilson joined the Dodgers' active roster on August 19 and made his debut with the team on August 22 against the Miami Marlins at Marlins Park. He appeared in 18 games for the Dodgers with a 2-1 record and a 0.66 ERA. Regardless of signing for the team late in the season, Wilson made three relief appearances in the postseason without giving up an earned run until the Dodgers lost in the 2013 NLCS to the St. Louis Cardinals.

On December 5, 2013, Wilson agreed to a one-year, $10 million contract to return to the Dodgers. The deal also contained a player option for the 2015 season. His numbers were not as good in 2014, as he had a 4.66 ERA in 61 appearances. On October 8, Wilson announced that he would be exercising his $10 million player option for 2015. However, the Dodgers designated him for assignment on December 16 and released him on December 19, making him a free agent.

Wilson did not pitch in the major leagues in 2015 or 2016 but announced in early 2017 that he would be attempting a comeback as a knuckleball pitcher. However, he did not sign with another team.

== Scouting report ==
Wilson was a power pitcher. He had a repertoire of four pitches. He threw a straight four-seam fastball around 92-95 mph; this was one of his main pitches. He also had a slider, a cut fastball, and a two-seam fastball. His slider traveled around 89 mph. His cut fastball allowed him to use fewer four-seam fastballs. In 2011, he started throwing the two-seam fastball as well. The two-seamer started away on a right-handed hitter (or in to a left-handed hitter) and had dramatic inward (or outward) movement over the plate. He also experimented with curveballs, screwballs, and knuckleballs.

Wilson has said that when pitching, players cannot be worried about the potential outcome.

This is a man's sport. You can't go in there with doubts. You can't accept failure, and you certainly can't go into a situation thinking, 'Oh, gosh, what's going to happen?' You make what's going to happen. ... This game isn't for negative emotions, or being scared.

== Personal life ==
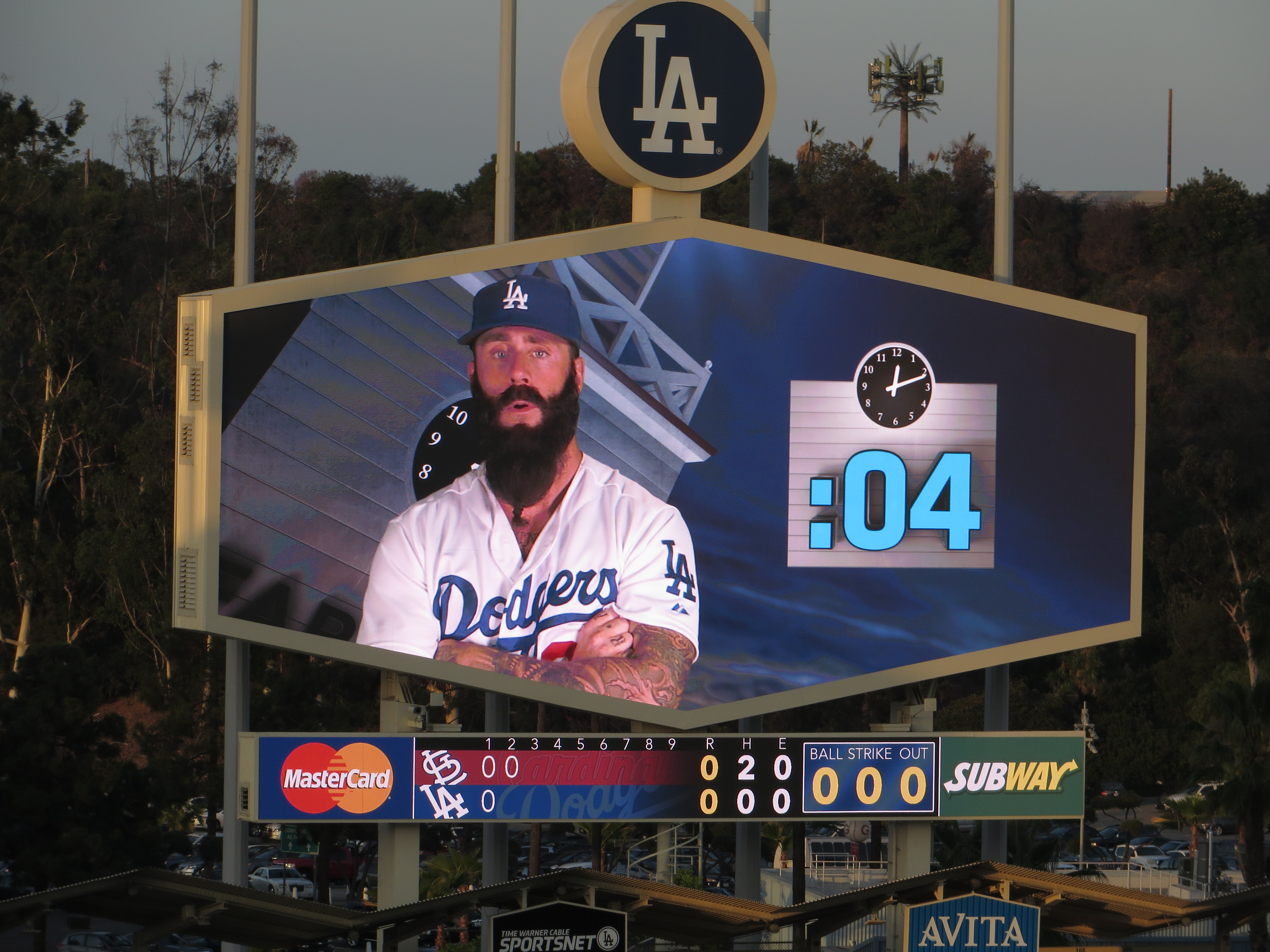
Brian Wilson on the scoreboard of Dodger Stadium in 2014

Wilson is noted for his flamboyant personality.

In the 2010 All-Star Game, Wilson debuted a pair of bright orange cleats and continued to wear them throughout the season. On July 27, Marlins' manager Edwin Rodríguez complained that the shoes were too bright. Wilson received a $1,000 fine from MLB the next day, and he responded by coloring half of the shoes black with a marker. He said afterwards, "The fact that he (Rodríguez) thinks these shoes throw 97–100 with cut might be a little far-fetched. I guess we should probably have these checked for performance-enhancing cleats." He also stated that he was punished "for having too much awesome on my feet."

In addition to his mohawk hairstyle, Wilson has a large black beard, which he began growing and presumably dyeing during the Giants' playoff run in 2010. He never admitted to dyeing it, saying in 2010, "It's dark because we play a lot of day games. It's tanned. It's focused." He decided he would not shave until the Giants' season was over, and only if they failed to win the World Series. During the Giants' playoff run in 2010, Giants' fans began growing their own beards or wearing fake beards. Many fans chanted "Fear the Beard", and held up signs bearing the same motto. Teammate Sergio Romo also began growing a beard in 2010; he has had it intermittently ever since.

Wilson has a number of tattoos. On his left shoulder, he has a dragon to honor his father, which represents the "protection from fear" that Wilson's dad gave him. Across his chest, he has the words "In nomine patris" ("In the name of the father"), and on his right wrist he has a Celtic cross with lettering that says "All Honor To Him" in Gaelic; both of these tattoos symbolize his Christian faith. Finally, he has Japanese Kanji characters on his arm, which symbolize his faith; they say, "Father. Son. Eternal Strength."

Wilson has enjoyed a great deal of media attention during his career. He once had a locally produced, self-filmed reality show called Life of Brian. He has often been on Cheap Seats. Following the World Series in 2010, a photo of Wilson celebrating with teammate Buster Posey appeared on the cover of Sports Illustrated. Wilson also appeared on The Tonight Show with Jay Leno and Lopez Tonight. He has frequently starred in commercials.

Wilson became a Christian at the age of 23. He has adopted a gesture of crossing his arms, with his left hand in his glove and his right hand underneath pointing with the index finger while looking at the sky, which both honors The Holy Trinity as well as his late father who died of cancer when Wilson was 17. He performs it when he records a save or closes out a game.

On May 30, 2011 (Memorial Day), Wilson announced that in memory of his father, an Air Force veteran, he would endow two scholarships for LSU Air Force ROTC cadets. The scholarship will be a need based scholarship available to any college junior or senior. Later that year, on July 7, Wilson gave away 1,000 baseball gloves to members of the Giants Community Fund's Junior Giants baseball program.

Frequently, Wilson has made references to "The Machine", a character from the movie 8mm. In an episode of Cheap Seats, he had someone dressed as "The Machine" walk past in the background in full BDSM leather fetish apparel, supposedly unknown to him (but almost certainly teammate Pat Burrell). Another time, in an interview with Jim Rome, Wilson appeared to receive a call from "The Machine" and pulled a leather mask (allegedly "The Machine's") out of his pocket to show to Rome.

Wilson portrayed Peterson, a pitcher in the 2019 film Bottom of the 9th.

== See also ==
- List of Major League Baseball annual saves leaders
- List of San Francisco Giants team records
