= 2011 Los Angeles Dodgers season =

2011 Los Angeles Dodgers
- League: National League
- Division: West
- Ballpark: Dodger Stadium
- City: Los Angeles, California
- Record: 82–79 (.509)
- Divisional place: 3rd
- Owners: Frank McCourt
- General managers: Ned Colletti
- Managers: Don Mattingly
- Television: Prime Ticket; KCAL-TV (Vin Scully, Eric Collins, Steve Lyons)
- Radio: KABC (Vin Scully, Charley Steiner, Rick Monday); KTNQ (Jaime Jarrín, Pepe Yñiguez, Fernando Valenzuela)

The 2011 Los Angeles Dodgers season was the 122nd season for the Los Angeles Dodgers franchise in Major League Baseball (MLB), their 54th season in Los Angeles, California, since moving from Brooklyn after the 1957 season and their 49th season playing their home games at Dodger Stadium in Los Angeles California.

The team was attempting to rebound from its fourth-place National League West finish in 2010. The Dodgers struggled in the first half of the season but wound up finishing with a winning record thanks to playing good baseball in August and September. They still finished the season in third place. Some positives included pitcher Clayton Kershaw winning the NL Pitching Triple Crown and Cy Young Award, and outfielder Matt Kemp leading the league in home runs and RBI and finishing second for the NL MVP.

== Offseason ==
=== Managerial change ===
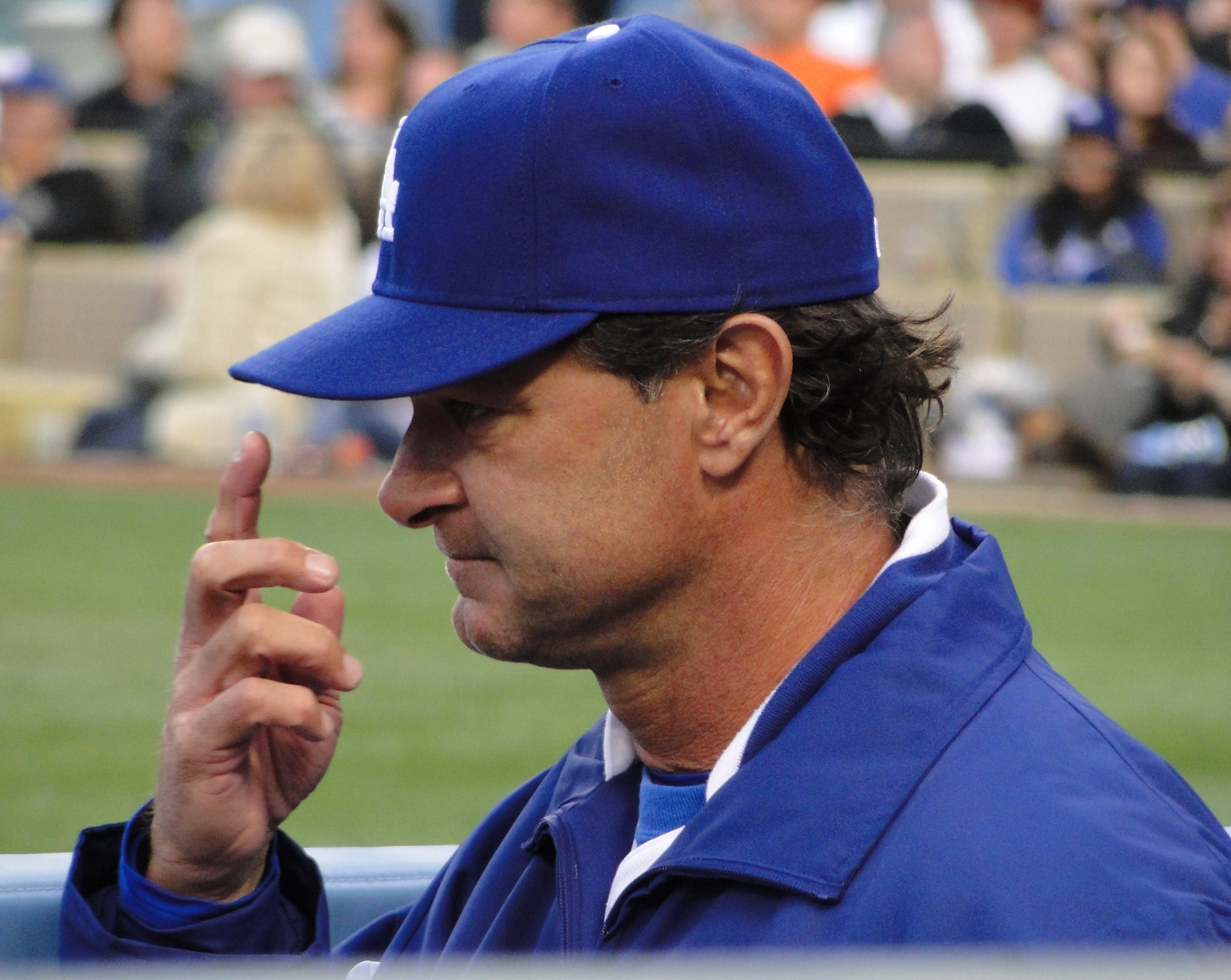
Don Mattingly, new manager of the Dodgers

After three seasons with the Dodgers, Joe Torre chose to step down and turn the managerial reins over to his hitting coach Don Mattingly for the 2011 season. Torre's 2,326th and final win was the last game of the 2010 season. Mattingly's managerial career actually began in the fall of 2010 when he managed the Phoenix Desert Dogs of the Arizona Fall League, a team that several Dodger prospects were playing for.

=== Front office/Coaching staff ===
On October 7, 2010, the Dodgers announced that they were severing ties with club president Dennis Mannion, who had overseen all club operations for the past year. Owner Frank McCourt would take on a more "direct and active" role with the club.

On November 22, 2010, the Dodgers announced their coaching staff for the 2011 season. Returning from Joe Torre's staff were pitching coach Rick Honeycutt and bullpen coach Ken Howell. Jeff Pentland, who had been a secondary hitting coach, was promoted to hitting coach. New staff members included bench coach Trey Hillman, secondary hitting instructor Dave Hansen, first base coach Davey Lopes and third base coach Tim Wallach.

Dodgers ownership was thrown into question on December 7, when the Judge in Frank McCourt's divorce case against Jamie McCourt invalidated an agreement that would have given McCourt sole ownership of the Dodgers. McCourt vowed to try some other legal options to keep himself as sole owner of the team.

The Dodgers front office lost a key person when vice-president and assistant general manager Kim Ng accepted a position as senior VP for Baseball Operations with Major League Baseball.

=== Departing players ===
Veteran catcher Brad Ausmus retired at the end of the 2010 season. At the conclusion of the 2010 season, Rod Barajas, Hiroki Kuroda, Vicente Padilla, Jay Gibbons, Reed Johnson and Jeff Weaver all became free agents. Scott Podsednik also became a free agent, after declining his part of a mutual option, on November 4. On December 2, the Dodgers chose not to tender a contract to former All-Star, Catcher Russell Martin, making him a free agent. General Manager Ned Colletti described this decision as, "one of the toughest decisions I've had to make, maybe ever." Due to Martin's decreased production the past two seasons and his uncertain recovery from season ending surgery in 2010, the Dodgers felt he was not worth the salary increase he would have received in arbitration. They also released relief pitcher George Sherrill and outfielder Trent Oeltjen. To clear spots on their 40-man roster, the Dodgers traded infielder Chin-lung Hu to the New York Mets for minor league pitcher Michael Antonini and designated reliever Brent Leach for assignment so that he could sign with the Yokohama BayStars of the Japanese Leagues.

=== Player signings/trades ===
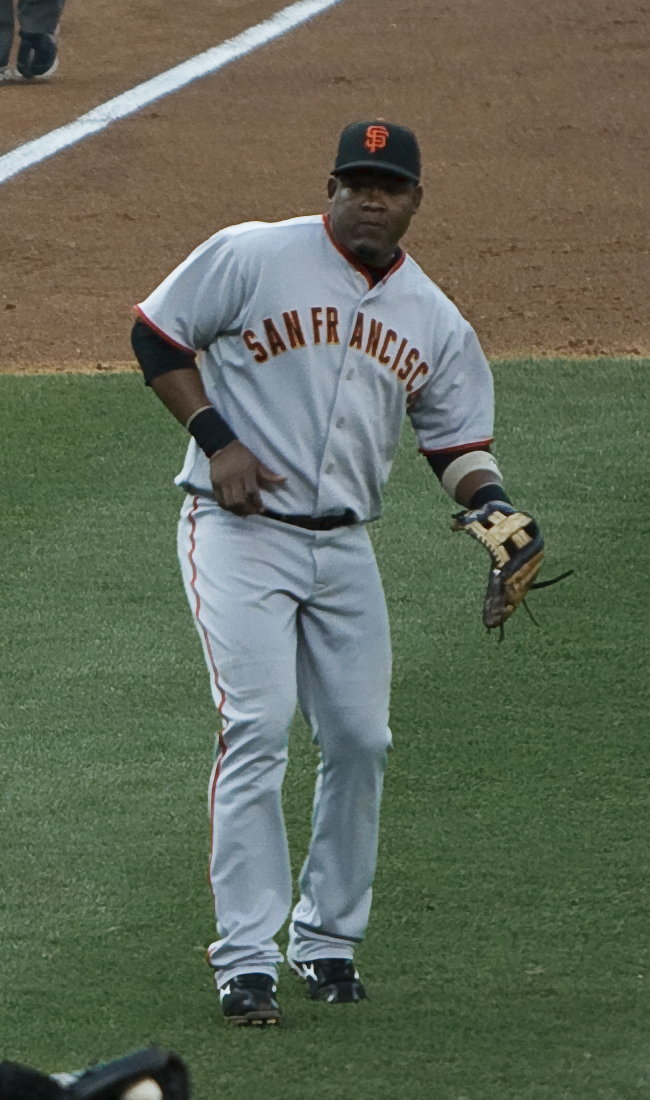
Former Giant Juan Uribe joined the Dodgers for 2011

On October 19, the Dodgers announced that they had re-signed starting pitcher Ted Lilly to a three-year contract. On November 4, Jay Gibbons re-signed with the Dodgers for one-year. On November 15, the Dodgers re-signed starting pitcher Hiroki Kuroda to a one-year, $12 million, contract. On November 19, the Dodgers signed minor league catcher Héctor Giménez and added him to their 40-man roster. On November 26, the Dodgers completed their rebuilding of the starting rotation by signing veteran pitcher Jon Garland. On November 30, the Dodgers signed veteran infielder Juan Uribe to a three-year contract, intending to make him the new second baseman. Soon afterward, the Dodgers traded incumbent second baseman Ryan Theriot to the St. Louis Cardinals for relief pitcher Blake Hawksworth. On December 3, one day after releasing veteran Russell Martin, the Dodgers re-signed Catcher Rod Barajas to a one-year deal. Soon afterward, on December 9, the Dodgers finalized a deal to bring back pitcher Vicente Padilla with a one-year contract. Padilla was slated to compete with Garland for the fifth starter spot, and also to possibly pitch out of the bullpen. On December 11, the Dodgers signed outfielder Tony Gwynn Jr. to a one-year deal. On December 14, the Dodgers signed catcher Dioner Navarro to a contract, to compete with Barajas and A. J. Ellis for time behind the plate. The Dodgers added to the relief corps on December 16 by signing right-handed pitcher Matt Guerrier to a three-year contract. The Dodgers signed outfielder Marcus Thames on January 18.

== Spring training ==
Spring training for the 2011 season officially got under way on February 16, 2011, when the pitchers and catchers reported to Camelback Ranch. One pitcher who did not report, however, was reliever Ronald Belisario. For the third season in a row, Belisario missed his reporting date due to visa problems in his home country. Belisario remained stuck in Venezuela indefinitely, missing the entire season. The Dodgers also made news on the first day of camp by naming Clayton Kershaw as the opening day starting pitcher. The Dodgers pitching depth took a major hit when Vicente Padilla underwent surgery to repair a radial nerve injury and Jon Garland suffered a strained oblique muscle. The spring training injury problems continued with both third baseman Casey Blake and catcher Dioner Navarro suffering injuries that would keep them off the opening day roster.

== Regular season ==
=== Off the field ===
On April 20, Baseball commissioner Bud Selig announced that Major League Baseball would appoint a representative to take over all business and day-to-day operations of the Dodgers. The move was likely instigated by media reports that owner Frank McCourt had to arrange a $30 million loan from Fox to cover the teams payroll as well as uncertainty over the teams ownership situation relating to the ongoing divorce litigation. On April 25, Selig appointed former Texas Rangers president Tom Schieffer to be the man in charge of the Dodgers situation.

In June, Frank and Jamie McCourt reached an out-of-court settlement of their divorce case, which was contingent on MLB's approval of the proposed television contract between the Dodgers and FOX, which would have included an ownership stake in Fox Sports Prime Ticket. However, on June 20, Commissioner Selig announced that he was rejecting the proposed deal on the grounds that it was not in the best interests of the Dodgers.

With speculation circulating that McCourt would be unable to meet the payroll at the end of June and that he might then lose the team, on June 27, the Dodgers filed for Chapter 11 Bankruptcy protection.

=== Season standings ===
==== National League West ====
NL West
Team	W	L	Pct.	GB	Home	Road
Arizona Diamondbacks	94	68	.580	—	51‍–‍30	43‍–‍38
San Francisco Giants	86	76	.531	8	46‍–‍35	40‍–‍41
Los Angeles Dodgers	82	79	.509	11½	42‍–‍39	40‍–‍40
Colorado Rockies	73	89	.451	21	38‍–‍43	35‍–‍46
San Diego Padres	71	91	.438	23	35‍–‍46	36‍–‍45

==== National League Wild Card ====
Division leaders
Team	W	L	Pct.
Philadelphia Phillies	102	60	.630
Milwaukee Brewers	96	66	.593
Arizona Diamondbacks	94	68	.580

Wild Card team (Top team qualifies for postseason)
Team	W	L	Pct.	GB
St. Louis Cardinals	90	72	.556	—
Atlanta Braves	89	73	.549	1
San Francisco Giants	86	76	.531	4
Los Angeles Dodgers	82	79	.509	7½
Washington Nationals	80	81	.497	9½
Cincinnati Reds	79	83	.488	11
New York Mets	77	85	.475	13
Colorado Rockies	73	89	.451	17
Florida Marlins	72	90	.444	18
Pittsburgh Pirates	72	90	.444	18
Chicago Cubs	71	91	.438	19
San Diego Padres	71	91	.438	19
Houston Astros	56	106	.346	34

=== Opening Day starters ===
Opening Day starters
Name	Position
Rafael Furcal	Shortstop
Tony Gwynn Jr.	Left fielder
Andre Ethier	Right fielder
Matt Kemp	Center fielder
James Loney	First baseman
Juan Uribe	Third baseman
Rod Barajas	Catcher
Jamey Carroll	Second baseman
Clayton Kershaw	Starting pitcher

=== March/April ===
The Dodgers began the season on March 31 against the San Francisco Giants at Dodger Stadium. Starting pitcher Clayton Kershaw outpitched Giants ace Tim Lincecum, striking out nine batters in seven shutout innings, as the Dodgers won 2–1. After the game, a Giants fan was seriously injured after he was assaulted in the Dodger Stadium parking lot. The incident would provoke increased security at future home games as well as a joint fundraiser by the two teams in support of the man's family. Back on the field, the Dodgers took the second game of the series also, as some aggressive baserunning by Matt Kemp and two Giants errors were just enough offense to back a solid start by Chad Billingsley in the 4–3 win. Matt Cain and three relievers combined to shut out the Dodgers 10–0 the following day, as Ted Lilly and Kenley Jansen each gave up four runs in the loss. A big seventh inning, including an RBI triple by Marcus Thames helped Hiroki Kuroda and the Dodgers take the series with a 7–5 victory in the finale.

The Dodgers began their first roadtrip of the season in Colorado for a two-game series with the Rockies. Troy Tulowitzki hit a home run to key the Rockies 3–0 win in the opener and Billingsley struggled in the second game as the Rockies won 7–5. Tony Gwynn Jr. singled home the winning run in the bottom of the 11th as the Dodgers beat his former team, the San Diego Padres 4–2 to start their next series. The game had been suspended due to rain in the top of the ninth and was not finished till the following day. Kuroda pitched 8 2/3 scoreless innings in the second game of the series as the Dodgers won 4–0. John Ely made a spot start for the Dodgers on April 10 against the Padres, allowing two home runs while the Dodgers offense could only tally four singles in a 7–2 loss. Kershaw continued his dominance over the Giants in his next start, blanking them for 6 2/3 innings while the Dodgers opened a series in San Francisco with a 6–1 victory. The victory came with a cost, however, as starting shortstop and leadoff hitter Rafael Furcal suffered a broken thumb while stealing third base. He was placed on the disabled list and the team announced that he would need four to six weeks for total recovery. The Dodgers blew a three-run lead in the second game of the series, losing 5–4. Two solo homers by Pablo Sandoval and Mike Fontenot in the sixth inning off Ted Lilly led to a 4–3 defeat in the series finale.

The Dodgers returned home on April 14 to begin a four-game series against the St. Louis Cardinals. Kuroda struggled with his control in the opener as the Dodgers lost 9–5. Jon Garland made his first start of the season the next day, but he was wild and the Dodgers were pounded 11–2. Clayton Kershaw had his first poor outing of the season in game 3 of the series, as the Dodgers lost 9–2 to extend their losing streak to five games. The Dodgers snapped that streak the following day as Billingsley pitched eight shut out innings, while striking out eleven. Matt Kemp hit a walk-off two-run home run in the bottom of the ninth for the 2–1 win. The Dodgers then began a four-game homestand with the Atlanta Braves. Prior to the first game, the Dodgers called up their 2010 minor league player of the year, Jerry Sands, who doubled in his first at-bat and later picked up his first RBI to back solid pitching from Ted Lilly in the Dodgers 2–1 win. Brandon Beachy outpitched Kuroda in the next game, as the Braves broke open a tight game with an eight-run ninth inning to pull off a 10–1 rout. Jon Garland bounced back from his rough debut to pick up the complete-game victory, as Andre Ethier had three hits including a home run and Juan Uribe had four RBI in the Dodgers 6–1 victory. Matt Kemp hit a two-run walk-off home run in the 12th inning as the Dodgers beat the Braves 5–3 to end the series.

On April 22 the Dodgers opened a six-game road trip by beating the Chicago Cubs 12–2. The next day, the Cubs scored five runs off Matt Guerrier in the bottom of the eighth to come from behind to beat the Dodgers 10–8. In the game, Andre Ethier extended his hitting streak to 20 games. The Dodgers scored five runs in the first inning to back Kuroda's solid 6 2/3 innings pitched as they won the series finale 7–3 over the Cubs. The Dodgers next traveled to Florida to take on the Marlins. They lost the opener after a ninth-inning fielding error by shortstop Jamey Carroll allowed the tying run to score in the ninth inning. A batter later, Omar Infante singled in the winning run off Jonathan Broxton and the Marlins came from behind to win 5–4. On April 26, Ethier extended his hitting streak to 23 games, setting an MLB April record but the Dodgers offense struggled and the team lost to the Marlins 4–2. The Dodgers won the last game of the series 5–4 on an Andre Ethier home run in the 10th inning. Vicente Padilla pitched the bottom of the 10th, for his first save since 2000.

The Dodgers returned home on April 29 to begin a three-game series against the Padres. In the opener, solo homers by Uribe and Kemp and a game saving diving catch by Tony Gwynn Jr. helped the Dodgers pick up a 3–2 with. The Dodgers lost 5–2 the next day as wild pitch by Matt Guerrier and an error by Dioner Navarro let three costly runs score in the 8th to break the tie.

=== May ===
After playing .500 ball in April, the Dodgers were shut out by the Padres to start the month of May 7–0. The Dodgers opened a series with the Cubs on May 2 with a 5–2 victory as doubles by Uribe, Barajas and Sands led the Dodgers offense in support of starter Clayton Kershaw. Two walks in the ninth inning by Jonathan Broxton doomed the Dodgers the following day as they lost 4–1, despite seven strong innings from starter Chad Billingsley, who only allowed one run. Andre Ethier extended his hitting streak to 29 games, and tied Zack Wheat for second place on the Dodgers franchise list. The Dodgers dropped the final game of the homestand 5–1 to the Cubs as Ethier sat out the game due to a sore elbow.

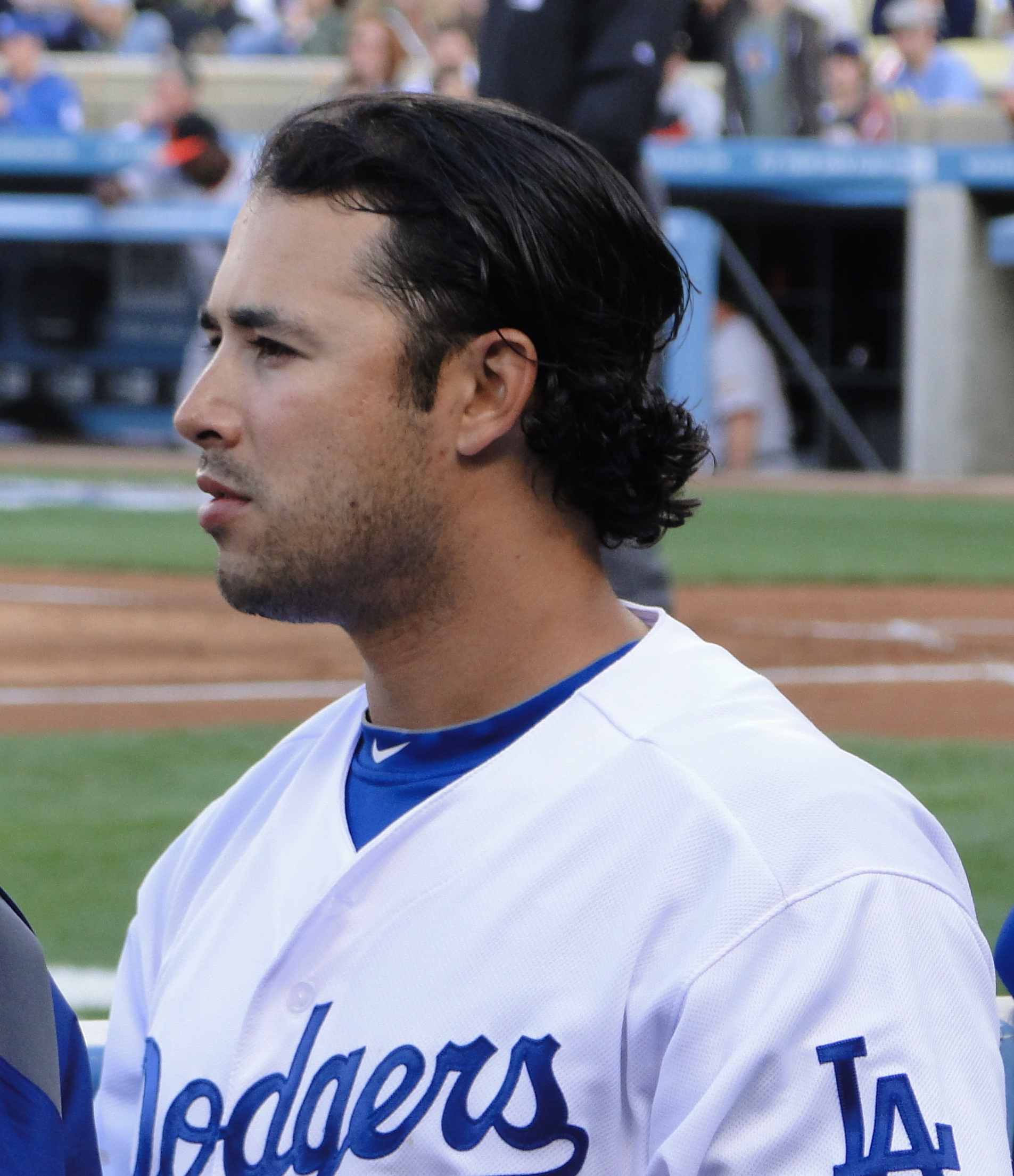
Andre Ethier had a 30-game hitting streak from April–May

The Dodgers dropped their third straight on the opener of a road series against the New York Mets, 6–3 as Jason Pridie hit a three-run homer off Kuorda with two outs in the sixth inning. Ethier's hitting streak finally ended on May 7, when he went 0 for 4 against the Mets. He finished with a 30-game hitting streak, second most in Dodgers history behind the 31 game streak by Willie Davis in 1969. The game was doubly disappointing as the Dodgers losing streak hit 4 with a 4–2 loss. Clayton Kershaw pitched 6 2/3 strong innings and Andre Ethier hit a two-run homer to end the losing streak with a 4–2 win. The Dodgers road woes continued on May 9, when Manager Don Mattingly and third baseman Juan Uribe were both ejected after a bad umpire call in the eighth and the Pirates scored three runs in the next half inning to beat the Dodgers 4–1. The Dodgers picked up a big win the next day as Matt Kemp broke open a scoreless tie with a three-run homer in the sixth inning and the Dodgers offense took off for a 10–3 win. The Dodgers took the lead in the series on May 11 as they shut out the Pirates 2–0 thanks to an excellent start by Hiroki Kuroda, who struck out eight in seven innings. The Dodgers finale against the Pirates was called off due to rain after two innings with the Dodgers leading 1–0. The game would eventually be made up on September 1.

The team returned home on May 13 to take on the Arizona Diamondbacks. Clayton Kershaw struck out 11 and the bullpen survived a shaky ninth inning to hold on for a 4–3 win. The next day, Chad Billingsley allowed only hit and one unearned run in eight innings but the Dodgers still lost 1–0 as the offense was completely shut down. The Dodgers offense continued to sputter on May 15, as Ian Kennedy held them to one run in six innings and the Dodgers lost 4–1. The Milwaukee Brewers came to town for a brief two-game series and took the opener from the Dodgers 2–1 as Carlos Gómez robbed Uribe of a home run and Shaun Marcum stifled the Dodgers offense. The Dodgers finally won a game on May 18 as Kuroda and two relievers shut down the Brewers and Matt Kemp's two-run homer in the first provided just enough offense for a 3–0 victory. The San Francisco Giants came to town on May 19 and beat the Dodgers on a three-run home run by Cody Ross in the ninth inning for an 8–5 win. The Dodgers disappointing homestand came to a close when they failed to cash in a bases-loaded situation in the bottom of the ninth and fell 3–1 to the Giants. Nate Schierholtz robbed Jamey Carroll of a potential game-winning hit to clinch the game.

The Dodgers opened interleague play with a 6–4 10 inning victory over the Chicago White Sox. However, the next day Jon Garland got lit up for seven runs in 3 2/3 innings as the Dodgers lost 9–2. The White Sox put another hurt on the Dodgers the next day, 8–3 as both Ethier and Barajas left the game with injuries. On May 24, Kenley Jansen unraveled in the ninth inning, allowing three runs with two outs to blow a save 4–3 to the Houston Astros. Jerry Sands hit his first career grand slam home run on May 25 to lift the Dodgers to a 5–4 victory. The Dodgers lost the final game of the series as J. R. Towles hit a walk-off single off Matt Guerrier in the ninth inning.

The Dodgers returned home on May 28 and pinch hitter Dioner Navarro hit a bases-loaded line drive single with no outs in the bottom of the ninth o lift the Dodgers to a 3–2 victory and allow rookie Rubby De La Rosa to pick up his first career victory. The Dodgers offense went back into hibernation mode on the 29th as the Marlins picked up a 6–1 victory. he Dodgers picked up their first series win in more than a month on the 29th, thanks to a dominant performance from Clayton Kershaw. He pitched his second complete-game shutout of his career, recording 10 strikeouts and also picking up two hits, the same amount the Marlins managed in the game. The Dodgers offense also came alive, for an 8–0 victory. The offense continued against the Rockies on May 30, when James Loney hit a home run and Ethier was 2 for 4 with 3 RBI in the 7–1 win. Matt Kemp and Casey Blake both homered in the Dodgers 8–2 win as the team closed out the month of May with a three-game winning streak, where the offense has been unusually productive.

=== June ===
The Dodgers brief winning streak came to an end as they were shut out by Ubaldo Jiménez 3–0 to begin June.

The Dodgers offense apparently didn't make the road trip to Cincinnati to play the Reds on June 3, losing 2–1. The Dodgers erased a five-run deficit in the eighth inning on June 4 and won 11–8 in extra innings. Matt Kemp hit two home runs, including the game tying grand slam in the win. The Dodgers concluded their series with the Reds with a 9–6 win on June 5 as Chad Billingsley picked up the win and also homered and contributed a career-high three RBIs. Cliff Lee out pitched Ted Lilly on June 6, striking out 10 in seven innings in the Phillies 3–1 win over the Dodgers. Rookie Rubby De La Rosa made his first Major League start on July 7, allowing one run in five innings, fellow rookie Dee Gordon, had hits in his first three career at-bats and Matt Kemp added the insurance runs with a two-run home run as the Dodgers won 6–2. Cole Hamels shut down the Dodgers the next day as the Phillies held on for a 2–0 win. Matt Kemp finished a single away from the cycle, but the Dodgers pitching melted down, allowing five runs in the seventh inning to blow a five-run lead and lose 9–7 to the Colorado Rockies on June 9. Kemp didn't start the following day, but came off the bench to hit his league leading 19th homer to spark a five-run rally in the ninth, but the Dodgers still fell a bit short, losing to the Rockies 6–5. On June 11, Aaron Miles and Jamey Carroll combined to go 8 for 9 and Casey Blake had a three-run pinch double to spark the offense but it was spectacular defensive plays by Dee Gordon and Tony Gwynn Jr. that saved the game for a shaky bullpen as the Dodgers won 11–7. The Dodgers got the best of Ubaldo Jiménez in their second meeting with him, as James Loney hit a grand slam and Matt Kemp and Rod Barajas added solo blasts in the 10–8 win.

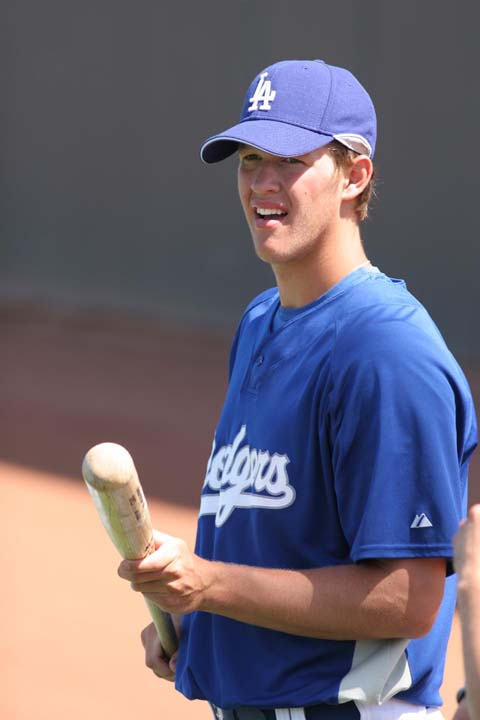
Clayton Kershaw pitched two consecutive complete game victories in June

The Dodgers returned home to play the Reds, dropping the opener 6–4 when Dee Gordon committed a costly error in the seventh inning with the game tied, leading to four runs scoring. The Dodgers wasted a fine start by Kershaw on June 15 as the Scott Elbert allowed a go-ahead eighth-inning single to Joey Votto and the Reds won 3–2. Scott Rolen got three hits and drove in three runs as the Reds finished off their sweep of the Dodgers 7–2. The slumping Dodgers were subsequently handled by Houston starter Brett Myers, who retired 17 consecutive batters at one point and made only 98 pitches in a 7–3 Astros win. The Dodgers home losing streak hit five when they were shut out by the Astros 7–0 on June 18. The game was doubly frustrating because starting catcher Rod Barajas suffered an ankle strain in the second inning and joined the multitude of Dodgers already on the disabled list. Manager Don Mattingly said after the game, "We're frustrated, that's for sure, but you know what? We don't have time to be frustrated ... This is not the time to feel sorry for ourselves." The Dodgers avoided being swept by the last place Astros with a 1–0 victory on June 19, that ended the five-game losing streak. A solo homer by Dioner Navarro in the bottom of the 8th inning was all the Dodgers offense could muster, but it was enough as Hiroki Kuroda and two relievers pitched a shutout. In the next game, Clayton Kershaw was dominant, striking out 11 in a two-hit shutout of the Detroit Tigers. He also hit a two-run eighth-inning single to extended the Dodgers lead in the 4–0 win. Chad Billingsley's turn was next and he also pitched effectively, allowing just one run in 5 1/3 innings as the Dodgers won their third straight, 6–1, over the Tigers. Matt Kemp reached base all five times he came up to bat in the series finale, with three hits (including a triple) and two walks but the Dodgers were done in by four home runs hit by the Tigers off of Ted Lilly in the 7–5 loss. The Los Angeles Angels came to town next for the next installment of the Freeway Series. In the opener, the Angels won a sloppy game with baserunning and fielding errors 8–3. "I don't like the way it's going, thats for sure." Manager Don Mattingly said after the Dodgers lost 6–1 in game 2. The Dodgers bounced back to take the series finale 3–2. Clayton Kershaw struck out eleven in the game and pitched his second straight complete game, the first Dodger to do so in 11 years. Tony Gwynn Jr.'s RBI single in the bottom of the ninth won it for the Dodgers.

The Dodgers next continued interleague play with a road trip to play the Minnesota Twins. The Dodgers had a season-high 24 hits and 15 runs as they shut out the Twins. The game was the largest margin of victory for the Dodgers since September 2, 2002, and the largest shutout since June 28, 1969. Every member of the Dodgers' starting lineup had at least one hit, one run and one RBI for the first time in LA Dodger history. The Dodgers couldn't keep the momentum going as Ted Lilly struggled in the next game, and they lost 6–4 to the Twins. The Dodgers finished the month of June by dropping a close one to the Twins, 1–0. Rubby De La Rosa pitched a career-high seven innings, allowing just the one run on six hits, but it was not enough as the Dodgers offense went back into hibernation. The team finished the month ten games under .500 and fell into last place in the National League Western division. Matt Kemp summed up the team's attitude, "We have a lot of time left, we're going to keep playing, keep battling, and we're going to try our best to turn this thing around. We've got faith in ourselves."

=== July ===
The Dodgers started the month of July with a 5–0 road win against the Angels. Hiroki Kuroda pitched seven scoreless innings, while allowing only three hits for his first win since mid-May.Clayton Kershaw struck out ten batters on July 2 but was also charged with a season-high seven runs, while Jered Weaver shut down the Dodgers for a 7–1 Angel win. Chad Billingsley pitched a complete game in the final interleague game against the Angels, but a Russell Branyan home run in the seventh inning cost him the game, as the Angels beat the Dodgers 3–1.

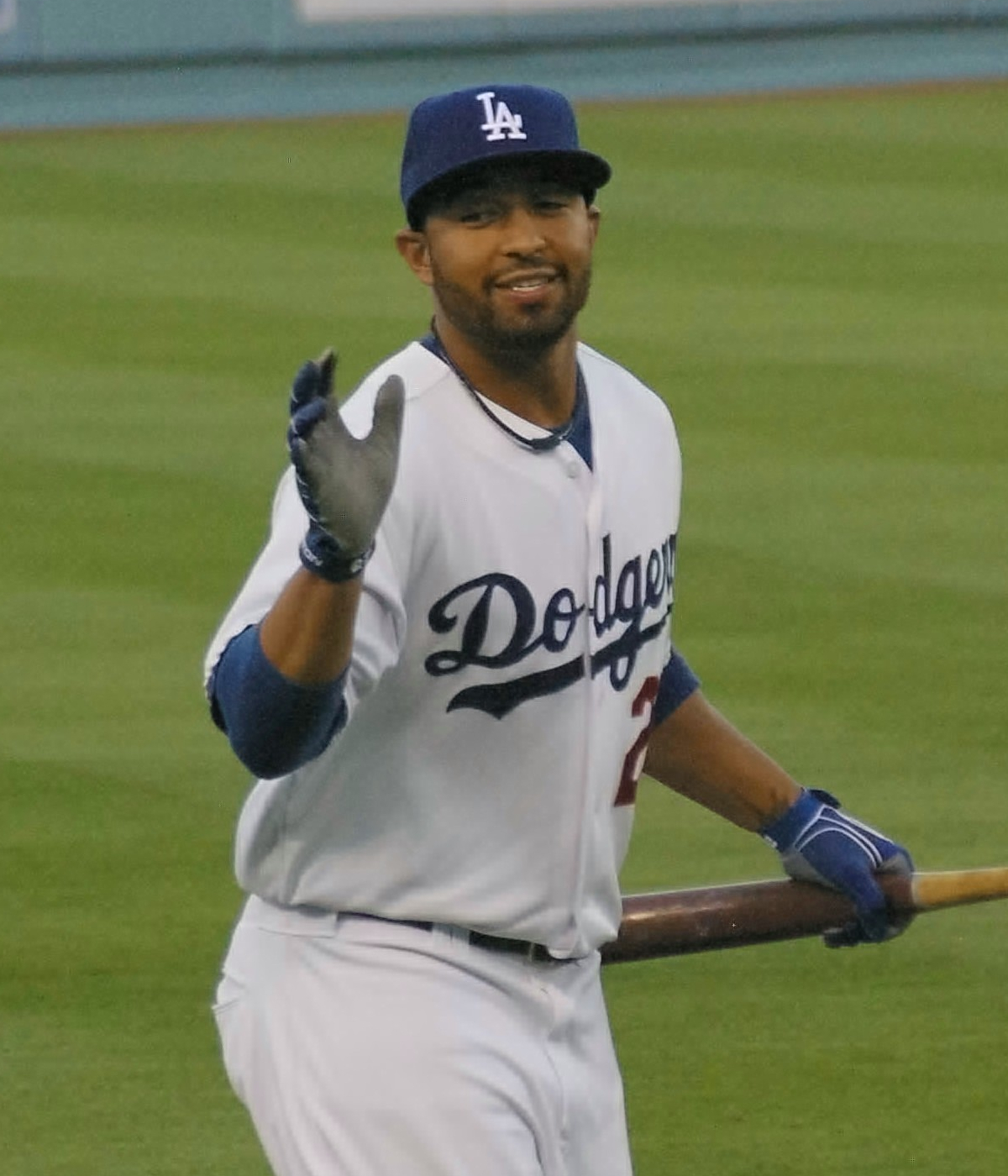
Matt Kemp was voted a starter for the All-Star game and would lead the league in home runs and RBI

One positive for the Dodgers amidst their increasingly forlorn season was when Matt Kemp and Clayton Kershaw were selected to represent the team at the All-Star Game. It would be the first all-star appearances for both of them. Andre Ethier was a Final Vote candidate but finished second to Shane Victorino of the Philadelphia Phillies. However, Victorino was injured and unable to participate so Ethier was selected to replace him on the All-Star roster, his second consecutive All-Star selection.

The Dodgers returned home for a Fourth of July matchup with the New York Mets. The game was only the Dodgers second sellout of the season and for five innings Rubby De La Rosa offered hope, as he was working on a no-hitter. However, he gave up three doubles in the sixth and the Dodgers found themselves on the wrong end of a 5–2 contest. The Dodgers offense continued to sputter the next day as they left 13 men on base in a 6–0 shut out loss to the Mets. The Dodgers lost their fifth straight game, when the Mets beat them 5–3 on July 6. "Right now it's a little embarrassing because our team is better than last place..." Matt Kemp said to reporters after the game, "I think we're all disappointed in ourselves at this moment, but we need to just not make excuses, keep playing the game and turn this thing around." Another terrific pitching performance by Clayton Kershaw snapped the losing streak. He pitched eight shutout innings, while striking out nine in the 6–0 victory. Kershaw became the first Dodger pitcher with nine or more strikeouts in four consecutive starts since Hideo Nomo in 1996 Chad Billingsley matched Kershaw with eight shutout innings on July 8, Rafael Furcal came up with his first RBI since May 29 in the bottom of the eighth and rookie closer Javy Guerra escaped a bases-loaded situation in the ninth as the Dodgers won their second straight shutout, 1–0, against the San Diego Padres. The next day was another pitching duel. Aaron Harang and Rubby De La Rosa both pitched great games, De La Rosa only allowed one hit in his six innings of work and Harang was working on a no-hitter when he was taken out of the game after six. The Dodgers did not record a hit in the game until Juan Uribe doubled with two outs in the bottom of the ninth off Luke Gregerson. Dioner Navarro then singled him home for the winning run in the Dodgers second straight 1–0 victory over the Padres and their third straight shut out win. Andre Ethier hit two home runs on July 10, to lead the Dodgers to a 4–1 victory, their first series sweep of the season and first four-game winning streak of the season. They climbed out of last place and headed into the all-star break with a 41–51 record.

During the all-star break, the Dodgers made a trade.. acquiring outfielder Juan Rivera from the Toronto Blue Jays for future considerations. To make room on the roster, they designated often-injured Marcus Thames for assignment. "Juan will be the right-handed counterpart to Tony Gwynn Jr. in left field, and he can fill in at first base", said general manager Ned Colletti. Matt Kemp competed in the Home Run Derby during the All-Star break, but only managed to hit two home runs and did not advance past the first round. Kemp's comment on his performance was, "It's harder than it looks." The National League won the All-Star game 5–1. Kemp reached base twice with a walk and a single, Ethier singled in his only at-bat and Kershaw pitched a scoreless inning on only eight pitches.

The Dodgers began the second half of the season where they left off, extending their winning streak to five with a 6–4 road victory over the Arizona Diamondbacks. Clayton Kershaw struck out eight in seven innings, allowing four unearned runs in the seventh thanks to a Juan Uribe error and a Xavier Nady home run. Juan Rivera welcomed himself to his new teammates by hitting a home run on the first pitch he saw as a Dodger. The streak ended the next day as Hiroki Kuroda's bad luck continued. He allowed a three-run homer to Brandon Allen, and that was all the Diamondbacks needed as they held on for a 3–2 win, despite Matt Kemp's 24th homer of the season. Ted Lilly struck out nine batters in 6 2/3 innings on July 17, but he also gave up two home runs, including one to Diamondbacks pitcher Daniel Hudson. Hudson, meanwhile pitched a complete game, and the only run the Dodgers scored in the 4–1 defeat was on a wild pitch. In the game, Lilly became the first Dodger pitcher since Jeff Weaver in 2005 to allow both 20 homers and 20 steals in a season. The Dodgers next traveled to San Francisco to play the first place Giants. Ryan Vogelsong shut down the Dodgers anemic offense, 5–0, to drop them a season worst 13 1/2 games behind the Giants. It was the Dodgers 10th shutout loss of the season. Hong-Chih Kuo allowed a two-run double to Brandon Belt in the seventh inning to lead the Giants to a 5–3 victory over the Dodgers on July 19. With the offense continuing to sputter, ranking next to last in runs scored in the league, the team fired hitting coach Jeff Pentland on July 20. Assistant hitting coach Dave Hansen was promoted to interim hitting coach for the rest of the season. Clayton Kershaw again snapped the Dodgers losing streak, pitching eight shutout innings while striking out 12 to out duel Giants ace Tim Lincecum on July 20. Dioner Navarro's solo homer into McCovey Cove in the seventh was all the Dodger could muster but it was enough in the 1–0 win.

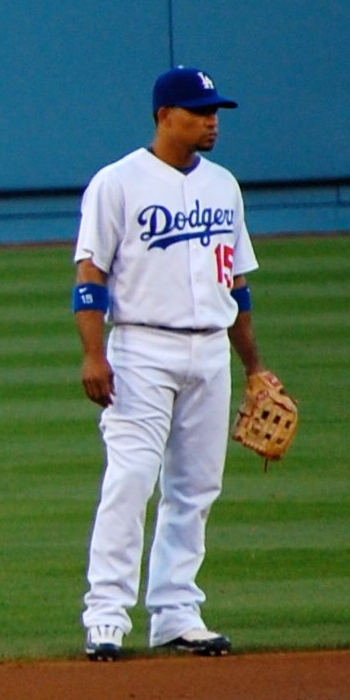
Shortstop Rafael Furcal's six years with the Dodgers came to an end when he was traded to the Cardinals on July 31.

Kuroda pitched 6 1/3 innings and allowed three runs, including a two-run homer to pitcher John Lannan as the Dodgers lost 7–2 to the Washington Nationals at Dodger Stadium on July 23. Rafael Furcal hit a walk-off double to beat the Nationals the next day as the Dodgers came from three runs behind to win 7–6. Chad Billingsley overcame a shaky first inning to retire 21 of the last 22 batters he faced, striking out 10 in seven innings as the Dodgers picked up a rare series win with a 3–1 victory. Rookie pitchers Rubby De La Rosa and Javy Guerra led the Dodgers to an 8–5 victory over the Colorado Rockies on July 25. De La Rosa threw a career-high 113 pitches, allowing just three hits and a run in six innings. After the bullpen faltered in the ninth, Guerra came in with the bases loaded and retired the Rockies four and five hitters for the save. The Dodgers won their fourth straight the following day, as Kershaw picked up his 12th win of the season with a 3–2 victory. With the trading deadline approaching and much speculation about the possibility of him being traded, Hiroki Kuroda took the mound for the Dodgers on July 27. Kuorda pitched well, allowing only one run in six innings but was saddled with his 13th loss when the Dodgers offense again failed to hit, scoring only 1 run in the 3–1 defeat. Kuroda, despite pitching well all season, became the first Dodger pitcher with back to back 13 loss seasons since Orel Hershiser in 1992 and 1993. Matt Kemp homered and knocked in five runs in the Dodgers 9–5 victory over the Arizona Diamondbacks on July 29. Chad Billingsley walked five batters in 5 2/3 innings and they all came around to score as the Dodgers dropped a game to the Diamondbacks 6–4. Meanwhile, Kuroda exercised the "no-trade clause" in his contract to ensure he would remain with the team for the remainder of the season. The Dodgers did make a move though, trading injury prone shortstop Rafael Furcal to the St. Louis Cardinals for minor league outfielder Alex Castellanos. The Dodgers month came to a close when Rubby De La Rosa allowed back-to-back home runs to the Diamondbacks in the second inning and the team limped to a 6–3 defeat, finishing off yet another month with a losing record.

=== August ===
Clayton Kershaw started August off on the right foot, pitching his fourth complete game of the season and picking up his league leading 13th win in the 6–2 road victory over the San Diego Padres. In his first start since electing not to be traded, Hiroki Kuroda was masterful, pitching seven shutout innings while striking out eight as the Dodgers beat the Padres 1–0 for Kuroda's first win since July 1. The news was not all good on the day however, as the team announced that rookie starter Rubby De La Rosa would have to undergo season ending Tommy John surgery. He was 4–5 with a 3.71 ERA for the Dodgers during his 13 appearances (10 starts). Ted Lilly allowed only one run (on a solo homer by Jason Bartlett) in six innings the next day, but it was not enough as Tim Stauffer shut the Dodgers down and the bullpen coughed up a couple more runs in a 3–0 loss to the Padres. Chad Billingsley picked up his 10th win on August 5 against the Arizona Diamondbacks, 7–4. This would be the fifth straight season with double digit wins for Billingsley. The Dodgers scored six runs on seven hits in the third inning to open up the lead. Javy Guerra picked up his first four out save for his 10th of the season. On August 6, the Dodger promoted Nathan Eovaldi from the Double-A Chattanooga Lookouts to make the start against the Diamondbacks. In his Major League debut, he pitched five innings while allowing only two runs and striking out seven. The Dodgers did just enough offensively to get Eovaldi the win, 5–3. Cody Ransom hit a two-run homer in the seventh inning to help the Diamondbacks avoid a sweep and snap Clayton Kershaw's five-game winning streak.

The Dodgers returned home to play the Philadelphia Phillies. The Dodgers feeble offense managed to pound out 13 hits against Phillies ace Roy Halladay, but only scored three runs and fell short 5–3. The Dodgers lost another pitchers' duel the following day, 2–1, as Cliff Lee shut down the Dodgers for eight innings and hit a home run to lead the Phillies to the win, despite a good start from Ted Lilly. The Dodgers offense finally woke up against Vance Worley in the final game of the series. They jumped out to a 6–0 lead early thanks to a Juan Rivera three-run homer. However, Chad Billingsley couldn't make it out of the fifth and Blake Hawksworth gave up a two-run homer to Ryan Howard as the Dodgers lost 9–8, to be swept by the Phillies and extend their losing streak to four games. The Houston Astros, the worst team in the majors, came to Dodger Stadium on August 12, featuring a lineup of mostly recent minor league call-ups. However, the Dodgers still had trouble scoring as Nathan Eovaldi and Bud Norris engaged in a scoreless duel for six innings. The Dodgers finally broke through with a lead off double by Casey Blake in the 10th, followed by a walk-off hit by Matt Kemp for the 1–0 win. Clayton Kershaw picked up his career high 14th win with eight dominate innings against the Astros in a 6–1 Dodger victory. Kemp's two-run homer in the 1st set the tone for the offense. The Dodgers completed their sweep of the Astros with a 7–0 shutout victory on August 14. Hiroki Kuroda went seven, striking out six. Kemp hit his 28th homer and rookie Justin Sellers, who was just called up from the minors two days before, hit a three-run blast for his first career homer.

The Dodgers next went back on the road to face the first place Milwaukee Brewers. Ted Lilly was again sharp, allowing just two hits in seven innings of work, but one of the hits was a solo home run by Ryan Braun. The Brewers added two more solo shots off Dodger relievers in the eighth and won 3–0 as the Dodgers hit into 4 double plays and a triple play and were unable to score against Randy Wolf. The Dodgers had another strong pitching performance from their starter the next day, as Chad Billingsley allowed only one run in seven innings of work, but the Dodgers were unable to solve Yovani Gallardo and the game was tied at 1–1 entering the bottom of the ninth. However, relief pitchers Hong-Chih Kuo and Mike MacDougal were unable to record an out in the inning and the Brewers recorded the 2–1 walk-off win on Mark Kotsay's bases loaded pinch-hit single. The Brewers won another pitching duel from the Dodgers the following day 3–1 despite another strong start by rookie Nathan Eovaldi. Tony Gwynn Jr. hit his first home run since July 17, 2010 for the Dodgers lone run of the game. Clayton Kershaw helped the Dodgers avoid a sweep by pitching eight shutout innings to pick up his 15th win as the Dodgers won 5–1 on August 18. Kershaw became the first Dodger pitcher to pick up his 15th win before September since Hideo Nomo in 2003. Hiroki Kuroda finally got some run support, picking up the win in the Dodgers 8–2 victory over the Colorado Rockies on August 19. Rod Barajas hit a three-run homer in the third inning as Kuroda allowed two runs in six innings for his seventh consecutive quality start since the all-star break. The Dodgers blew an extra inning lead and lost to the Rockies 7–6 in 13 innings the next day. They had taken the lead in the top of the 12th on a solo homer by Aaron Miles and an inside the park homer by Trent Oeltjen, but rookie closer Javy Guerra blew his first save of the season. A walk-off single by Dexter Fowler in the 13th ended the game. Oeltjen's inside the park homer was the 1st by a Dodger since Blake DeWitt on May 6, 2008. James Loney had 4 hits in 4 at-bats on the 21st, including his 6th homer of the season. Chad Billingsley struck out 7 and only allowed 3 hits in 7 2/3 innings, but was victimized by two 2-run homers by Carlos González and Seth Smith and the Dodgers dropped the finale against the Rockies 5–3. With the win, the Rockies broke a 17-game losing streak in Sunday games, a Major League record. The Dodgers next started a three-game series on the road against the St. Louis Cardinals. Chris Carpenter blanked the Dodgers through eight innings, but the Dodgers rallied in the ninth as Aaron Miles hit an RBI triple off Fernando Salas to tie the score at one and then Rod Barajas hit a grounder to short that former Dodger Rafael Furcal bobbled to allow Miles to score with the winning run. Kershaw picked up his 16th win the next night, pitching six scoreless innings in the Dodgers 13–2 win over the Cardinals. Matt Kemp and Aaron Miles hit solo homers and Rod Barajas hit two homers as the Dodger offense had a rare outburst of power. The Dodgers won the final game of the series 9–4 thanks to a six-run third inning and another effective performance by Hiroki Kuroda. The offensive outburst included the first career home run by A. J. Ellis as the Dodgers picked up their first series sweep of the Cardinals on the road since 1993. The Dodgers also moved ahead in the lifetime series with the Cardinals 1,002 wins to 1,001 for the Cards.

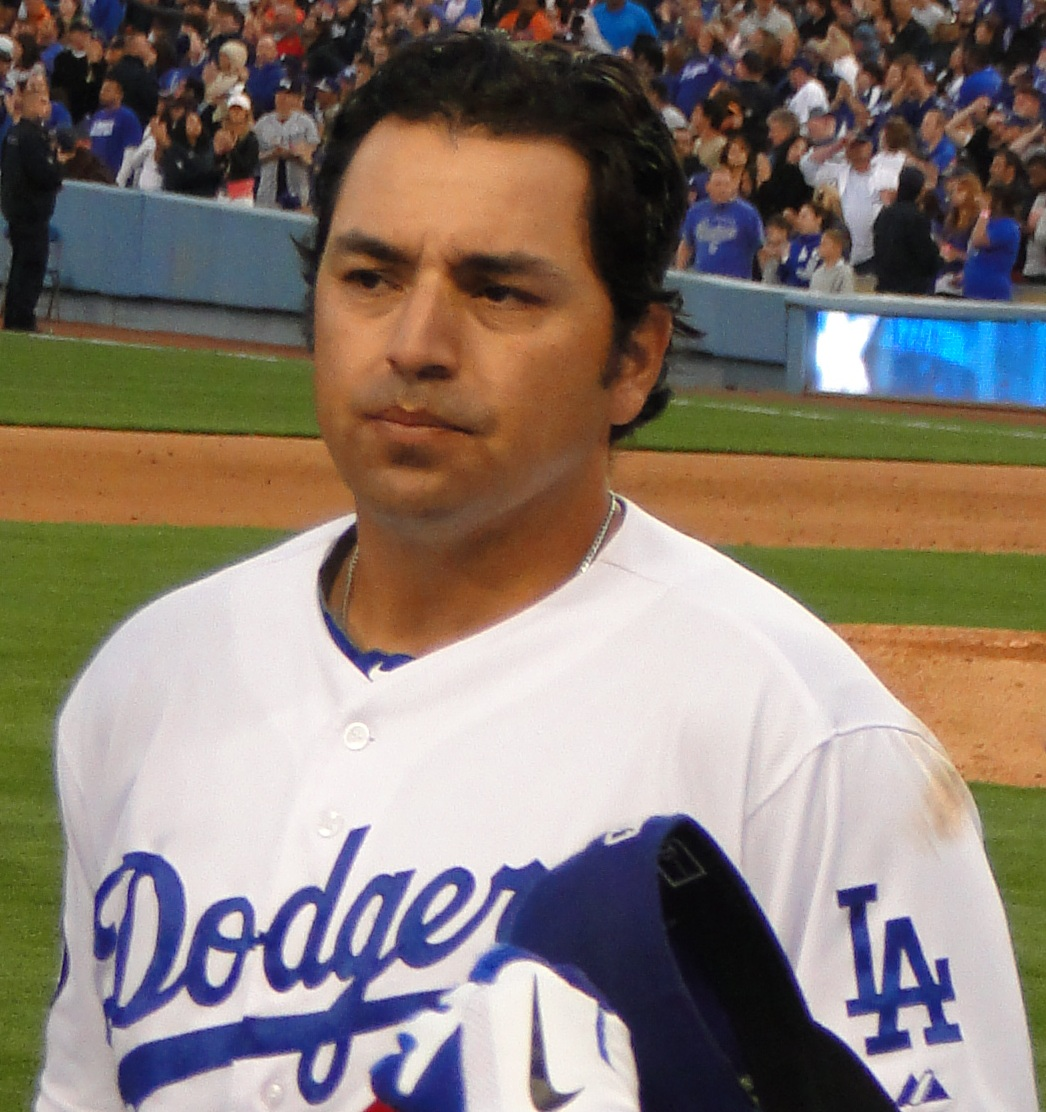
Rod Barajas hit .357 with 4 doubles, 6 home runs and 19 RBIs in 18 games in August.

The Dodgers returned home to open a series against the Colorado Rockies. Ted Lilly allowed only one run (on a first-inning homer by Carlos González) in his seven innings of work, but the Dodgers still trailed 1–0 heading into the bottom of the seventh. However, they managed to score six runs in the seventh to win 6–1. James Loney and Matt Kemp hit back-to-back home runs in the inning. For Kemp it was his 30th of the season, joining Raúl Mondesí as the only Dodger members of the 30–30 club. The Dodgers fell behind 4–0 in the second game of the series but battled back with a 5-run sixth to take the lead, only to see Troy Tulowitzki put the Rockies back up with a 2-run homer off struggling reliever Hong-Chih Kuo in the top of the seventh. James Loney hit his second homer in as many days to tie the game in the ninth and Matt Kemp hit his 31st homer, a walk-off shot off Jason Hammel in the 11th. This was the first time Loney had hit home runs in back-to-back days since September 11–12 2007. The Dodgers short winning streak was snapped the next day as rookie starter Nathan Eovaldi allowed five runs to score in the top of the first, thanks in part to a defensive miscue by outfielder Trent Oeltjen. The Dodgers did stage a rally, but still fell shot with a 7–6 loss. Clayton Kershaw allowed only one run on six hits for his fifth complete game of the year and 17th win as the Dodgers defeated the San Diego Padres 4–1 on August 29. James Loney hit his fifth home run in August, after only hitting four the first three months of the season and the Dodgers clinched their first winning month of the season. The Dodgers scored eight runs in the second inning on August 30 as Tim Stauffer walked six and Andre Ethier hit a grand slam home run. The Dodgers sent 13 batters to the plate that inning, the most since May 25, 2009 against the Rockies. The Dodgers finished the month of August with their second sweep of the Padres, the big blow was a two-run homer by Rod Barajas in the second. The Dodgers August record of 17–11 gave them their first winning month since June 2010.

=== September ===
The Dodgers traveled to Pittsburgh on September 1 to make up a game that had been rained out on May 12 against the Pirates. Dana Eveland, who had spent the season in AAA with the Albuquerque Isotopes was called up to make the start, his first in the Majors since June 2010. He allowed only one run on six hits in eight innings to collect the win. Some shaky moments from the bullpen made it close in the end, but the Dodgers prevailed 6–4. Chad Billingsley struggled in the opener of a three-game series with the Atlanta Braves and the Dodgers fell behind 5–0. However, Juan Rivera and James Loney each drove in three runs and Dee Gordon had three hits, scored three runs and stole two bases as the Dodgers came from behind to win 8–6, for their 10th win in the last 11 games. The Dodgers scored only two runs the following day but managed to win 2–1 in 10 innings as Dee Gordon hit a standup double to right-center, advanced to third on a sacrifice bunt and scored on a sacrifice fly by Juan Rivera. The Dodgers earlier run came on a solo homer by A. J. Ellis in the second inning. With the win, the Dodgers had their first six-game winning streak of the season. Kershaw held the Braves scoreless through 6 innings the next day, while striking out 10 and the Dodgers built a 3–0 lead on a three-run homer by Matt Kemp. However, a costly error by Aaron Miles in the seventh allowed the Braves to tie the game and the Braves won a walk-off single by Martín Prado in the bottom of the ninth to avoid the sweep and snap the Dodgers winning streak. Hiroki Kuroda gave up three homers in the first inning and four in the game (2 of them to Mike Morse) as the Dodgers fell behind early and never recovered, losing to the Washington Nationals 7–2 on September 6. It was the first time the Dodgers had allowed three homers in the first inning since Fernando Valenzuela did it on June 25, 1988 to the Reds. The last Dodger pitcher to allow four home runs in a game was D. J. Houlton on August 29, 2005. The Nationals young phenom Stephen Strasburg made his first appearance since undergoing Tommy John surgery against the Dodgers on September 6. Strasburg pitched five scoreless innings and had a three-run lead when he left the game, however the Dodgers tied the score with 3 runs in the sixth off the Nationals bullpen. Rod Barajas hit a tie-breaking two-run double in the eighth and Javy Guerra worked out of trouble in the ninth to preserve the 7–3 win. Dodger pitchers (Lilly, Guerrier, Kuo, Jansen and Guerra) combined for 17 strikeouts in the game, a season high. The Dodgers scheduled game on September 7 against the Nationals was rained out and scheduled as a double header the next day. On their off day the Dodgers learned that Andre Ethier would be shut down for the rest of the season while seeking treatment for his injured knee. Juan Rivera smacked two doubles and drove in four runs and Tony Gwynn Jr. hit a two-out, two-run double in the top of the ninth as the Dodgers won the first game of their scheduled double-header 7–4. The second game was canceled because of continuing rain. The Dodgers traveled west for a series against their rivals, the San Francisco Giants. The first game was the third matchup of the season between Kershaw and Tim Lincecum and like the others it was a great pitching matchup. Linceum allowed only 1 run in his eight innings of work while Kershaw also allowed 1 run (unearned) in eight innings, while striking out nine. The Dodgers pushed across the go-ahead run in the top of the ninth to hand Kershaw his 18th win of the season 2–1. The Dodgers managed to get their record back to .500 for the first time since May 2 when they beat the Giants 3–0 on September 10. Dana Eveland, in his second start of the season, limited the Giants to just three hits in seven + innings. The Dodgers long road trip ended on September 11 with an 8–1 loss to the Giants. Kuroda had his shortest outing of the season, lasting only 4 2/3 innings and then the Giants blew the game open with a five-run sixth inning against the Dodger bullpen. Kuroda became the first Dodger pitcher to lose 16 games in a season since Orel Hershiser in 1987.

Back at Dodger Stadium after the long road trip, the Dodgers lost to the first place Arizona Diamondbacks 7–2, thanks to a five-run sixth inning. The Dodgers prevented Diamondbacks starter Ian Kennedy from winning his 20th game by scoring four runs of him in the 1st inning but the offense went into hibernation after that and Gerardo Parra hit a home run off Hong-Chih Kuo to tie the game in the 7th inning. Javy Guerra, in his first two-inning outing in the Majors walked in the go-ahead run in the 10th and the Dodgers lost 5–4. In the series finale, Kershaw allowed only one hit through five innings but was ejected in the sixth inning after hitting Gerardo Parra with a pitch. The bullpen held on and the Dodgers got just enough runs to win 3–2 and get him his 19th win of the season. The Dodgers were officially eliminated from the National League West race the next day, when they lost to the Pittsburgh Pirates 6–2. Pirates starter Ross Ohlendorf hit a three-run homer off of Dana Eveland for the big blow in the game. James Loney hit his first career pinch-hit home run, a three-run blast, in the sixth inning to lead the Dodgers to a 7–2 win over the Pirates the next day. Loney hit another three-run homer the following day, the first Dodger to hit three-run homers in consecutive appearances since Jeff Kent on May 9–10, 2006. The Dodgers won 6–1 and Matt Kemp picked up his 40th stolen base in the game, becoming just the 18th Major Leaguer and first Dodger with at least 30 homers and 40 stolen bases in a season. The Dodgers scored six runs in the second inning on September 18, to bludgeon the Pirates 15–1 to get back to .500. James Loney has a career-high five hits and Jerry Sands and Juan Rivera each had four RBI. The Dodgers began their last home series of the season on September 20 against the Giants with the fourth matchup of the season between Kershaw and Lincecum. Kershaw went 7 1/3 innings, allowed one run and struck out six. He became the Dodgers first 20-game winner since Ramón Martínez in 1990 and the first pitcher to go 5–0 against the Giants in history, beating Lincecum in 4 of those starts. That win moved the Dodgers record above .500 for the first time since April 29, but it didn't last long as Dana Eveland was roughed up in his next start and the Dodgers lost 8–5 to the Giants. Matt Kemp hit a three-run homer in the losing effort, for his 35th of the season. He became the 14th player in Major League history with at least 35 home runs and 35 stolen bases. The Dodgers ended their final home stand of the season with an 8–2 victory over the Giants. Kemp put the exclamation point on his MVP candidacy with a career-high three doubles and a two-run homer and Kuroda allowed only two runs on five hits in seven-plus innings.

Kemp continued his hot hitting by blasting his 37th home run of the season as the Dodgers beat the San Diego Padres 2–0. Eugenio Vélez, in a rare start, struck out three times to break the 75-year-old MLB record for most at-bats in a season without a hit (0 for 36) and tied a 102-year-old record for most consecutive at-bats without a hit (0 for 45, counting the previous season). The offense was silenced by Aaron Harang the following night and Chad Billingsley, in his final start of the season, allowed three runs in the fifth inning. The Padres held on to beat the Dodgers 3–0. Clayton Kershaw won his 21st game of the season in his final start on September 25 as the Dodgers beat the Padres 6–2. Kershaw clinched the pitching Triple Crown with a 2.28 ERA and 248 strikeouts. Kemp hit a three-run homer the following night as the Dodgers began their last series of the season with a 4–2 victory over the Arizona Diamondbacks. The victory assured the Dodgers of a winning record for the season. Hiroki Kuroda, in his final start of the season, pitched six shutout innings and the Dodgers scored five runs in the top of the 10th to lead 6–1 but, with two outs in the bottom of the 10th, reliever Blake Hawksworth loaded the bases. Javy Guerra came in, walked in a run, and then gave up a walk-off grand slam to Ryan Roberts as the Diamondbacks shocked the Dodgers 7–6. In the final game of the season, Matt Kemp hit his league leading 39th home run and Ted Lilly pitched seven scoreless innings. The Dodgers escaped a poor ninth by reliever Ramón Troncoso and won 7–5 to finish their season at 82–79, third place in the National League West.

=== Game log ===
Legend
Dodgers Win	Dodgers Loss	Game postponed

Please do not edit this line: OgreBot Begin-->

2011 Game Log
March/April (14–14)

#	Date	Opponent	Score	Win	Loss	Save	Attendance	Record
1	March 31	Giants	2–1	Kershaw (1–0)	Lincecum (0–1)	Broxton (1)	56,000	1–0
2	April 1	Giants	4–3	Billingsley (1–0)	Sánchez (0–1)	Broxton (2)	44,834	2–0
3	April 2	Giants	0–10	Cain (1–0)	Lilly (0–1)		40,809	2–1
4	April 3	Giants	7–5	Kuroda (1–0)	Runzler (0–1)	Broxton (3)	50,896	3–1
5	April 5	@ Rockies	0–3	Chacin (1–0)	Kershaw (1–1)	Street (2)	24,693	3–2
6	April 6	@ Rockies	5–7	Hammel (1–0)	Billingsley (1–1)	Street (3)	22,595	3–3
7	April 8	@ Padres	4–2 (11)	Hawksworth (1–0)	Frieri (0–1)	Broxton (4)	32,585	4–3
8	April 9	@ Padres	4–0	Kuroda (2–0)	Mosely (0–2)	Broxton (5)	42,420	5–3
9	April 10	@ Padres	2–7	Harang (2–0)	Ely (0–1)		33,949	5–4
10	April 11	@ Giants	6–1	Kershaw (2–1)	Bumgarner (0–2)		40,870	6–4
11	April 12	@ Giants	4–5	Affeldt (1–0)	Hawksworth (1–1)	Wilson (1)	41,960	6–5
12	April 13	@ Giants	3–4	Sánchez (1–1)	Lilly (0–2)	Wilson (2)	42,060	6–6
13	April 14	Cardinals	5–9	García (2–0)	Kuroda (2–1)		34,288	6–7
14	April 15	Cardinals	2–11	Lohse (2–1)	Garland (0–1)		36,282	6–8
15	April 16	Cardinals	0–2	McClellan (2–0)	Kershaw (2–2)		31,614	6–9
16	April 17	Cardinals	2–1	Broxton (1–0)	Franklin (0–2)		27,439	7–9
17	April 18	Braves	4–2	Lilly (1–2)	Hudson (2–2)		28,292	8–9
18	April 19	Braves	1–10	Beachy (1–1)	Kuroda (2–2)		41,596	8–10
19	April 20	Braves	6–1	Garland (1–1)	Lowe (2–3)		29,473	9–10
20	April 21	Braves	5–3 (12)	Guerrier (1–0)	Martínez (0–1)		30,711	10–10
21	April 22	@ Cubs	12–2	Billingsley (2–1)	Coleman (1–1)		36,595	11–10
22	April 23	@ Cubs	8–10	Samardzija (2–0)	Guerrier (1–1)	Mármol (5)	41,161	11–11
23	April 24	@ Cubs	7–3	Kuroda (3–2)	Zambrano (2–1)		32,943	12–11
24	April 25	@ Marlins	4–5	Sanches (3–0)	Broxton (1–1)		11,633	12–12
25	April 26	@ Marlins	2–4	Volstad (2–1)	Kershaw (2–3)	Núñez (7)	12,150	12–13
26	April 27	@ Marlins	5–4 (10)	Guerrier (2–1)	Sanches (0–1)	Padilla (1)	16,523	13–13
27	April 29	Padres	3–2	Lilly (2–2)	Richard (1–2)	Broxton (6)	36,870	14–13
28	April 30	Padres	2–5	Gregerson (1–1)	Guerrier (1–2)	Bell (6)	34,453	14–14

May (12–16)

#	Date	Opponent	Score	Win	Loss	Save	Attendance	Record
29	May 1	Padres	0–7	Moseley (1–3)	Garland (1–2)		39,869	14–15
30	May 2	Cubs	5–2	Kershaw (3–3)	Russell (1–4)	Broxton (7)	30,239	15–15
31	May 3	Cubs	1–4	Wood (1–1)	Broxton (1–2)	Mármol (8)	38,017	15–16
32	May 4	Cubs	1–5	Zambrano (4–1)	Lilly (2–3)		28,419	15–17
33	May 6	@ Mets	3–6	Igarashi (2–0)	Kuroda (3–3)	Rodríguez (8)	35,948	15–18
34	May 7	@ Mets	2–4	Byrdak (1–0)	MacDougal (0–1)	Rodríguez (9)	31,464	15–19
35	May 8	@ Mets	4–2	Kershaw (4–3)	Dickey (1–4)	Padilla (2)	26,312	16–19
36	May 9	@ Pirates	1–4	Veras (1–1)	Billingsley (2–2)	Hanrahan (11)	11,373	16–20
37	May 10	@ Pirates	10–3	Lilly (3–3)	Correia (5–3)		13,497	17–20
38	May 11	@ Pirates	2–0	Kuroda (4–3)	Maholm (1–5)	Padilla (3)	12,9210	18–20
N/A	May 12	@ Pirates	Postponed (rain); Makeup: September 1					
39	May 13	Diamondbacks	4–3	Kershaw (5–3)	Saunders (0–5)	Jansen (1)	35,506	19–20
40	May 14	Diamondbacks	0–1	Collmenter (2–0)	Billingsley (2–3)	Putz (8)	30,602	19–21
41	May 15	Diamondbacks	1–4	Kennedy (4–1)	Lilly (3–4)	Putz (9)	40,654	19–22
42	May 16	Brewers	1–2	Marcum (5–1)	Garland (1–3)	Axford (9)	35,346	19–23
43	May 17	Brewers	3–0	Kuroda (5–3)	Wolf (3–4)	Guerrier (1)	42,138	20–23
44	May 18	Giants	5–8	Wilson (4–1)	Cormier (0–1)		30,421	20–24
45	May 19	Giants	1–3	Bumgarner (1–6)	Billingsley (2–4)	Wilson (13)	34,248	20–25
46	May 20	@ White Sox	6–4 (10)	Jansen (1–0)	Santos (2–1)	MacDougal (1)	24,121	21–25
47	May 21	@ White Sox	2–9	Buehrle (4–3)	Garland (1–4)		25,519	21–26
48	May 22	@ White Sox	3–8	Jackson (4–5)	Kuroda (5–4)	Thornton (2)	25,081	21–27
49	May 23	@ Astros	3–4	Fulchino (1–2)	Jansen (1–1)		22,579	21–28
50	May 24	@ Astros	5–4	Billingsley (3–4)	Happ (3–6)	Guerra (1)	28,713	22–28
51	May 25	@ Astros	1–2	Melancon (4–1)	Guerrier (2–3)		21,350	22–29
52	May 27	Marlins	3–2	De La Rosa (1–0)	Hensley (0–1)		34,407	23–29
53	May 28	Marlins	1–6	Mujica (5–2)	Kuroda (5–5)		29,971	23–30
54	May 29	Marlins	8–0	Kershaw (6–3)	Nolasco (4–1)		30,621	24–30
55	May 30	Rockies	7–1	Billingsley (4–4)	Hammel (3–5)		36,962	25–30
56	May 31	Rockies	8–2	Lilly (4–4)	Mortensen (1–3)		31,473	26–30

June (10–16)

#	Date	Opponent	Score	Win	Loss	Save	Attendance	Record
57	June 1	Rockies	0–3	Jiménez (1–5)	Garland (1–5)		36,975	26–31
58	June 3	@ Reds	1–2	Arroyo (4–5)	Kuroda (5–6)	Cordero (11)	31,402	26–32
59	June 4	@ Reds	11–8 (11)	Guerra (1–0)	Fisher (0–3)		40,324	27–32
60	June 5	@ Reds	9–6	Billingsley (5–4)	Wood (4–4)		28,327	28–32
61	June 6	@ Phillies	1–3	Lee (5–5)	Lilly (4–5)	Madson (13)	45,777	28–33
62	June 7	@ Phillies	6–2	De La Rosa (2–0)	Oswalt (3–4)		44,721	29–33
63	June 8	@ Phillies	0–2	Hamels (8–2)	Kuroda (5–7)	Madson (14)	44,751	29–34
64	June 9	@ Rockies	7–9	Betancourt (2–0)	Elbert (0–1)	Street (18)	26,066	29–35
65	June 10	@ Rockies	5–6	Chacín (7–4)	Billingsley (5–5)	Street (19)	32,116	29–36
66	June 11	@ Rockies	11–7	Lilly (5–5)	Hammel (3–6)		34,290	30–36
67	June 12	@ Rockies	10–8	De La Rosa (3–0)	Jiménez (1–7)	Elbert (1)	32,650	31–36
68	June 13	Reds	4–6	Arroyo (5–6)	Kuroda (5–8)	Cordero (13)	31,372	31–37
69	June 14	Reds	2–3	Cueto (4–2)	Hawksworth (1–2)	Cordero (14)	39,233	31–38
70	June 15	Reds	2–7	Wood (5–4)	Billingsley (5–6)		30,443	31–39
71	June 17	Astros	3–7	Myers (3–6)	Lilly (5–6)		35,053	31–40
72	June 18	Astros	0–7	W. Rodríguez (5–3)	De La Rosa (3–1)		36,124	31–41
73	June 19	Astros	1–0	Guerrier (3–3)	López (1–3)	Guerra (2)	44,665	32–41
74	June 20	Tigers	4–0	Kershaw (7–3)	Penny (5–6)		29,355	33–41
75	June 21	Tigers	6–1	Billingsley (6–6)	Scherzer (9–3)		37,769	34–41
76	June 22	Tigers	5–7	Alburquerque (4–1)	Lilly (5–7)	Valverde (17)	30,332	34–42
77	June 24	Angels	3–8	Haren (7–5)	De La Rosa (3–2)		43,640	34–43
78	June 25	Angels	1–6	Chatwood (5–4)	Kuroda (5–9)		41,108	34–44
79	June 26	Angels	3–2	Kershaw (8–3)	Walden (1–2)		43,104	35–44
80	June 28	@ Twins	15–0	Billingsley (7–6)	Blackburn (6–6)		39,487	36–44
81	June 29	@ Twins	4–6	Duensing (5–7)	Lilly (5–8)	Capps (12)	39,755	36–45
82	June 30	@ Twins	0–1	Baker (6–5)	De La Rosa (3–3)	Capps (13)	39,655	36–46

July (12–13)

#	Date	Opponent	Score	Win	Loss	Save	Attendance	Record
83	July 1	@ Angels	5–0	Kuroda (6–9)	Chatwood (5–5)		41,253	37–46
84	July 2	@ Angels	1–7	Weaver (10–4)	Kershaw (8–4)		42,232	37–47
85	July 3	@ Angels	1–3	Santana (4–8)	Billingsley (7–7)	Walden (19)	42,536	37–48
86	July 4	Mets	2–5	Capuano (8–7)	De La Rosa (3–4)	Rodríguez (21)	56,000	37–49
87	July 5	Mets	0–6	Pelfrey (5–7)	Lilly (5–9)		32,329	37–50
88	July 6	Mets	3–5	Niese (8–7)	Kuroda (6–10)	Rodríguez (22)	31,005	37–51
89	July 7	Mets	6–0	Kershaw (9–4)	Gee (8–3)		56,000	38–51
90	July 8	Padres	1–0	Billingsley (8–7)	Latos (5–10)	Guerra (3)	38,529	39–51
91	July 9	Padres	1–0	Hawksworth (2–2)	Gregerson (2–2)		29,744	40–51
92	July 10	Padres	4–1	Lilly (6–9)	Stauffer (5–6)	Guerra (4)	35,249	41–51
93	July 15	@ Diamondbacks	6–4	Kershaw (10–4)	Saunders (6–8)	Guerra (5)	24,966	42–51
94	July 16	@ Diamondbacks	2–3	Kennedy (10–3)	Kuroda (6–11)	Hernandez (8)	28,897	42–52
95	July 17	@ Diamondbacks	1–4	Hudson (10–5)	Lilly (6–10)		27,683	42–53
96	July 18	@ Giants	0–5	Vogelsong (7–1)	Billingsley (8–8)		42,323	42–54
97	July 19	@ Giants	3–5	Bumgarner (5–9)	Kuo (0–1)	Wilson (29)	42,391	42–55
98	July 20	@ Giants	1–0	Kershaw (11–4)	Lincecum (8–8)	Guerra (6)	42,487	43–55
99	July 22	Nationals	2–7	Lannan (7–6)	Kuroda (6–12)		39,839	43–56
100	July 23	Nationals	7–6	Guerra (2–0)	Mattheus (2–2)		34,590	44–56
101	July 24	Nationals	3–1	Billingsley (9–8)	Marquis (8–5)	Guerra (7)	36,458	45–56
102	July 25	Rockies	8–5	De La Rosa (4–4)	Nicasio (4–3)	Guerra (8)	28,860	46–56
103	July 26	Rockies	3–2	Kershaw (12–4)	Chacín (8–8)	Jansen (2)	50,664	47–56
104	July 27	Rockies	1–3	Cook (2–5)	Kuroda (6–13)	Street (27)	29,976	47–57
105	July 29	Diamondbacks	9–5	Lilly (7–10)	Collmenter (6–8)		35,169	48–57
106	July 30	Diamondbacks	4–6	Owings (5–0)	Billingsley (9–9)	Putz (23)	37,139	48–58
107	July 31	Diamondbacks	3–6	Saunders (8–8)	De La Rosa (4–5)	Putz (24)	43,935	48–59

August (17–11)

#	Date	Opponent	Score	Win	Loss	Save	Attendance	Record
108	August 1	@ Padres	6–2	Kershaw (13–4)	Luebke (3–6)		22,417	49–59
109	August 2	@ Padres	1–0	Kuroda (7–13)	Latos (5–11)	Guerra (9)	22,543	50–59
110	August 3	@ Padres	0–3	Stauffer (7–8)	Lilly (7–11)	Bell (31)	25,371	50–60
111	August 5	@ Diamondbacks	7–4	Billingsley (10–9)	Collmenter (6–7)	Guerra (10)	27,215	51–60
112	August 6	@ Diamondbacks	5–3	Eovaldi (1–0)	Saunders (8–9)	Elbert (2)	33,239	52–60
113	August 7	@ Diamondbacks	3–4	Kennedy (14–3)	Kershaw (13–5)	Putz (26)	25,575	52–61
114	August 8	Phillies	3–5	Halladay (15–4)	Kuroda (7–14)	Madson (20)	35,380	52–62
115	August 9	Phillies	1–2	Lee (12–7)	Lilly (7–12)	Madson (21)	46,547	52–63
116	August 10	Phillies	8–9	Kendrick (7–5)	Hawksworth (2–3)	Madson (22)	41,807	52–64
117	August 12	Astros	1–0 (10)	Lindblom (1–0)	Carpenter (0–2)		33,642	53–64
118	August 13	Astros	6–1	Kershaw (14–5)	Rodríguez (8–9)		36,111	54–64
119	August 14	Astros	7–0	Kuroda (8–14)	Lyles (1–7)		36,339	55–64
120	August 15	@ Brewers	0–3	Wolf (10–8)	Lilly (7–13)	Axford (35)	38,551	55–65
121	August 16	@ Brewers	1–2	Saito (4–1)	Kuo (0–2)		37,083	55–66
122	August 17	@ Brewers	1–3	Greinke (12–4)	Eovaldi (1–1)	Axford (36)	42,804	55–67
123	August 18	@ Brewers	6–1	Kershaw (15–5)	Estrada (3–8)		42,873	56–67
124	August 19	@ Rockies	8–2	Kuroda (9–14)	Hammel (7–12)		44,984	57–67
125	August 20	@ Rockies	6–7 (13)	Romero (1–0)	Hawksworth (2–4)		45,195	57–68
126	August 21	@ Rockies	3–5	Millwood (1–1)	Billingsley (10–10)	Betancourt (2)	49,083	57–69
127	August 22	@ Cardinals	2–1	Guerrier (4–3)	Salas (5–5)	Guerra (11)	35,198	58–69
128	August 23	@ Cardinals	13–2	Kershaw (16–5)	Lohse (11–8)		37,062	59–69
129	August 24	@ Cardinals	9–4	Kuroda (10–14)	García (10–7)		32,959	60–69
130	August 26	Rockies	6–1	Lilly (8–13)	Rogers (6–3)		38,960	61–69
131	August 27	Rockies	7–6 (11)	MacDougal (1–1)	Hammel (7–13)		35,537	62–69
132	August 28	Rockies	6–7	Chacin (11–10)	Eovaldi (1–2)	Betancourt (4)	38,503	62–70
133	August 29	Padres	4–1	Kershaw (17–5)	Latos (6–13)		29,764	63–70
134	August 30	Padres	8–5	Kuroda (11–14)	Stauffer (8–11)	Guerra (12)	36,589	64–70
135	August 31	Padres	4–2	Lilly (9–13)	LeBlanc (2–4)	Guerra (13)	27,767	65–70

September (17–9)

#	Date	Opponent	Score	Win	Loss	Save	Attendance	Record
136	September 1	@ Pirates	6–4	Eveland (1–0)	Lincoln (1–1)	Jansen (3)	12,224	66–70
137	September 2	@ Braves	8–6	Kuo (1–2)	Vizcaíno (1–1)	Guerra (14)	32,563	67–70
138	September 3	@ Braves	2–1 (10)	MacDougal (2–1)	Varvaro (0–1)	Guerra (15)	37,515	68–70
139	September 4	@ Braves	3–4	Kimbrel (4–2)	Hawksworth (2–5)		33,852	68–71
140	September 5	@ Nationals	2–7	Lannan (9–11)	Kuroda (11–15)		25,518	68–72
141	September 6	@ Nationals	7–3	Jansen (2–1)	Rodríguez (3–3)		29,092	69–72
N/A	September 7	@ Nationals	Postponed (rain); Makeup: September 8					
142	September 8	@ Nationals	7–4	MaDougal (3–1)	Storen (6–3)	Guerra (16)	21,638	70–72
N/A	September 8	@ Nationals	Canceled (rain)					
143	September 9	@ Giants	2–1	Kershaw (18–5)	Casilla (2–2)	Guerra (17)	41,902	71–72
144	September 10	@ Giants	3–0	Eveland (2–0)	Vogelsong (10–7)	Guerra (18)	42,121	72–72
145	September 11	@ Giants	1–8	Bumgarner (11–12)	Kuroda (11–16)		41,466	72–73
146	September 12	Diamondbacks	2–7	Saunders (11–12)	Lilly (9–14)	Putz (39)	30,616	72–74
147	September 13	Diamondbacks	4–5 (10)	Owings (7–0)	Guerra (2–1)	Putz (40)	31,404	72–75
148	September 14	Diamondbacks	3–2	Kershaw (19–5)	Hudson (16–10)	Jansen (4)	29,799	73–75
149	September 15	Pirates	2–6	Ohlendorf (1–2)	Eveland (2–1)	Hanrahan (38)	25,381	73–76
150	September 16	Pirates	7–2	Kuroda (12–16)	Locke (0–2)		41,148	74–76
151	September 17	Pirates	6–1	Lilly (10–14)	McDonald (9–9)		32,514	75–76
152	September 18	Pirates	15–1	Billingsley (11–10)	Lincoln (1–3)		37,802	76–76
153	September 20	Giants	2–1	Kershaw (20–5)	Lincecum (13–13)	Guerra (19)	32,526	77–76
154	September 21	Giants	5–8	Vogelsong (12–7)	Eveland (2–2)	Wilson (36)	32,334	77–77
155	September 22	Giants	8–2	Kuroda (13–16)	Bumgarner (12–13)		37,560	78–77
156	September 23	@ Padres	2–0	Lilly (11–14)	LeBlanc (4–6)	Guerra (20)	32,658	79–77
157	September 24	@ Padres	0–3	Harang (14–7)	Billingsley (11–11)	Bell (42)	39,966	79–78
158	September 25	@ Padres	6–2	Kershaw (21–5)	Luebke (6–10)		32,387	80–78
159	September 26	@ Diamondbacks	4–2	Eveland (3–2)	Hudson (16–12)	Guerra (21)	29,116	81–78
160	September 27	@ Diamondbacks	6–7 (10)	Owings (8–0)	Guerra (2–2)		25,669	81–79
161	September 28	@ Diamondbacks	7–5	Lilly (12–14)	Saunders (12–13)	Jansen (5)	41,791	82–79

== Roster ==
2011 Los Angeles Dodgers
Roster
Pitchers: 58 Chad Billingsley; 51 Jonathan Broxton; 37 Lance Cormier; 50,41 Rubby De La Rosa; 57 Scott Elbert; 48 John Ely; 50 Nathan Eovaldi; 37 Dana Eveland; 21 Jon Garland; 54 Javy Guerra; 55 Matt Guerrier; 36 Blake Hawksworth; 74 Kenley Jansen; 22 Clayton Kershaw; 56 Hong-Chih Kuo; 18 Hiroki Kuroda; 29 Ted Lilly; 52 Josh Lindblom; 66 Mike MacDougal; 44 Vicente Padilla; 38 Ramón Troncoso	Catchers: 28 Rod Barajas; 17 A. J. Ellis; 31 Tim Federowicz; 9 Héctor Giménez; 30 Dioner Navarro; Infielders: 23 Casey Blake; 14 Jamey Carroll; 3 Juan Castro; 13 Iván DeJesús Jr.; 15 Rafael Furcal; 9 Dee Gordon; 7 James Loney; 6 Aaron Miles; 46 Russ Mitchell; 12 Justin Sellers; 5 Juan Uribe	Outfielders: 16 Andre Ethier; 31 Jay Gibbons; 10 Tony Gwynn Jr.; 35 Jamie Hoffmann; 27 Matt Kemp; 49 Trent Oeltjen; 3 Xavier Paul; 33 Juan Rivera; 47 Jerry Sands; 33 Marcus Thames; 3 Eugenio Vélez	Manager: 8 Don Mattingly; Coaches: 25 Dave Hansen (hitting); 45 Trey Hillman (bench); 40 Rick Honeycutt (pitching); 43 Ken Howell (bullpen); 12,15 Davey Lopes (1st base); 11 Manny Mota; 41 Jeff Pentland (hitting); 26 Tim Wallach (third base)

== Player stats ==
=== Batting ===
Note: G = Games played; AB = At bats; R = Runs; H = Hits; 2B = Doubles; 3B = Triples; HR = Home runs; RBI = Runs batted in; BB = Walks; SO = Strikeouts; SB = Stolen bases; Avg. = Batting average OBP = On-base percentage; SLG = Slugging; OPS = On-base plus slugging

Player	G	AB	R	H	2B	3B	HR	RBI	BB	SO	SB	AVG	OBP	SLG	OPS
Matt Kemp	161	602	115	195	33	4	39	126	74	159	40	.324	.399	.586	.986
James Loney	158	531	56	153	30	1	12	65	42	67	4	.288	.339	.416	.755
Andre Ethier	135	487	67	142	30	0	11	62	58	103	0	.292	.368	.421	.789
Aaron Miles	136	454	49	125	17	3	3	45	25	49	4	.275	.314	.346	.660
Jamey Carroll	146	452	52	131	14	6	0	17	47	58	10	.290	.359	.347	.706
Tony Gwynn Jr.	136	312	37	80	12	6	2	22	23	61	22	.256	.308	.353	.660
Rod Barajas	98	305	29	70	13	0	16	47	22	71	0	.230	.287	.430	.717
Juan Uribe	77	270	21	55	12	0	4	28	17	60	2	.204	.264	.293	.557
Dee Gordon	56	224	34	68	9	2	0	11	7	27	24	.304	.325	.362	.686
Juan Rivera	62	219	24	60	12	1	5	46	21	35	2	.274	.333	.406	.740
Casey Blake	63	202	32	51	10	1	4	26	26	50	1	.252	.342	.371	.713
Jerry Sands	61	198	20	50	15	0	4	26	25	51	3	.253	.338	.389	.727
Dioner Navarro	64	176	13	34	6	1	5	17	20	35	0	.193	.276	.324	.600
Rafael Furcal	37	137	15	27	4	0	1	12	11	21	5	.197	.272	.248	.520
Justin Sellers	36	123	20	25	9	0	1	13	12	21	1	.203	.283	.301	.583
A. J. Ellis	31	85	8	23	1	1	2	11	14	16	0	.271	.392	.376	.769
Trent Oeltjen	61	71	10	14	1	1	2	6	13	30	6	.197	.322	.324	.646
Marcus Thames	36	66	4	13	1	1	2	7	4	16	0	.197	.243	.333	.576
Jay Gibbons	24	55	5	14	2	0	1	5	5	14	0	.255	.323	.345	.668
Russ Mitchell	25	51	5	8	1	0	2	3	7	10	0	.157	.259	.294	.553
Eugenio Vélez	34	37	5	0	0	0	0	1	2	11	1	.000	.075	.000	.075
Iván DeJesús Jr.	17	32	2	6	0	0	0	1	2	11	0	.188	.235	.188	.205
Juan Castro	7	14	2	4	0	0	0	1	1	4	0	.286	.333	.286	.619
Tim Federowicz	7	13	0	2	0	0	0	1	2	4	0	.154	.313	.154	.466
Xavier Paul	7	11	0	3	0	0	0	0	0	5	0	.273	.273	.273	.545
Hector Gimenez	4	7	0	1	0	0	0	0	0	3	0	.143	.143	.143	.286
Jamie Hoffmann	2	4	0	0	0	0	0	0	0	1	0	.000	.000	.000	.000
Pitcher totals	161	298	19	41	5	0	1	14	18	94	1	.138	.189	.164	.354
Team totals	161	5436	644	1395	237	28	117	613	498	1087	126	.257	.322	.375	.697

=== Pitching ===
Note: W = Wins; L = Losses; ERA = Earned run average; G = Games pitched; GS = Games started; SV = Saves; IP = Innings pitched; H = Hits allowed; R = Runs allowed; ER = Earned runs allowed; BB = Walks allowed; K = Strikeouts

Player	W	L	ERA	G	GS	SV	IP	H	R	ER	BB	K
Clayton Kershaw	21	5	2.28	33	33	0	233.1	174	66	59	54	248
Hiroki Kuroda	13	16	3.07	32	32	0	202.0	196	77	69	49	161
Ted Lilly	12	14	3.97	33	33	0	192.2	172	88	85	51	158
Chad Billingsley	11	11	4.21	33	32	0	188.0	189	98	88	84	152
Matt Guerrier	4	3	4.07	70	0	1	66.1	59	31	30	25	50
Rubby De La Rosa	4	5	3.71	13	10	0	60.2	54	26	25	31	60
Mike MacDougal	3	1	2.05	69	0	1	57.0	54	16	13	29	41
Jon Garland	1	5	4.33	9	9	0	54.0	55	26	26	20	28
Kenley Jansen	2	1	2.85	51	0	5	53.2	30	17	17	26	96
Blake Hawksworth	2	5	4.08	49	0	0	53.0	45	29	24	17	43
Javy Guerra	2	2	2.31	47	0	21	46.2	37	12	12	18	38
Nathan Eovaldi	1	2	3.63	10	6	0	34.2	28	14	14	20	23
Scott Elbert	0	1	2.43	47	0	2	33.1	27	9	9	14	34
Dana Eveland	3	2	3.03	5	5	0	29.2	28	10	10	6	16
Josh Lindblom	1	0	2.73	27	0	0	29.2	21	9	9	10	28
Hong-Chih Kuo	1	2	9.00	40	0	0	27.0	24	29	27	23	36
Ramón Troncoso	0	0	6.75	18	0	0	22.2	38	18	17	4	14
Lance Cormier	0	1	9.88	9	0	0	13.2	22	17	15	5	7
Jonathan Broxton	1	2	5.68	14	0	7	12.2	15	10	8	9	10
John Ely	0	1	4.26	5	1	0	12.2	12	6	6	7	13
Vicente Padilla	0	0	4.15	9	0	3	8.2	7	4	4	3	5
Team totals	82	79	3.54	161	161	40	1432.0	1287	612	563	507	1265

== Awards and honors ==
- 2011 Major League Baseball All-Star Game
  - Matt Kemp starter
  - Andre Ethier reserve
  - Clayton Kershaw reserve
- Cy Young Award
  - Clayton Kershaw
- National League Player of the Week
  - Clayton Kershaw: June 20–26
  - Matt Kemp: April 28 – May 4 and September 19–25
- National League Pitcher of the Month
  - Clayton Kershaw: July
- Baseball America Major League Player of the Year
  - Matt Kemp
- Warren Spahn Award
  - Clayton Kershaw
- Hank Aaron Award
  - Matt Kemp
- Sporting News National League All-Star Team
  - Clayton Kershaw
  - Matt Kemp
- Gold Glove Award
  - Clayton Kershaw
  - Matt Kemp
  - Andre Ethier
- Silver Slugger Award
  - Matt Kemp

== Transactions ==
=== March 2011 ===
- On March 30, placed RHP Jon Garland on the 15-day disabled list, retroactive to March 22, with a left oblique strain. Placed 3B Casey Blake on the 15-day disabled list, retroactive to March 22, with lower back pain. Placed C Dioner Navarro on the 15-day disabled list, retroactive to March 22, with right oblique strain. Placed LF Jay Gibbons on the 15-day disabled list, retroactive to March 26, with blurred vision in his left eye. Placed RHP Vicente Padilla on the 15-day disabled list, retroactive to March 22, for right elbow surgery. Purchased the contracts of RHP Lance Cormier, 3B Aaron Miles and RHP Mike MacDougal from AAA Albuquerque. Designated RHP Jon Link and 1B John Lindsey for assignment.

=== April 2011 ===
- On April 10, placed C Héctor Giménez on the 15-day disabled list with right knee pain, retroactive to April 9, and recalled RHP John Ely from AAA Albuquerque.
- On April 11, optioned RHP John Ely to AAA Albuquerque, and recalled OF Jamie Hoffmann from AAA Albuquerque.
- On April 12, placed IF Rafael Furcal on the 15-day disabled list with a broken left thumb, and recalled INF Iván DeJesús Jr. from AAA Albuquerque.
- On April 15, activated RHP Jon Garland from the 15-day disabled list and optioned OF Jamie Hoffmann to AAA Albuquerque.
- On April 16, placed LHP Hong-Chih Kuo on the 15-day disabled list with back strain, and recalled RHP Ramón Troncoso from AAA Albuquerque.
- On April 18, designated OF Xavier Paul for assignment, and purchased the contract of OF Jerry Sands from AAA Albuquerque.
- On April 21, optioned RHP Ramón Troncoso to AAA Albuquerque.
- On April 22, activated RHP Vicente Padilla from the 15-day disabled list.
- On April 25, activated C Dioner Navarro from the 15-day disabled list and optioned C A. J. Ellis to AAA Albuquerque.
- On April 29, placed IF Casey Blake on the 15-day disabled list with an infected left elbow, retroactive to April 25, and recalled INF Russ Mitchell from AAA Albuquerque.

=== May 2011 ===
- On May 1, activated LHP Hong-Chih Kuo from the 15-day disabled list and optioned RHP Kenley Jansen to AA Chattanooga.
- On May 3, placed OF Marcus Thames on the 15-day disabled list with a right quad strain, and activated OF Jay Gibbons from the 15-day disabled list.
- On May 6, placed RHP Jonathan Broxton on the 15-day disabled list with elbow problems, and recalled RHP Kenley Jansen from AA Chattanooga.
- On May 11, placed LHP Hong-Chih Kuo on the 15-day disabled list for anxiety disorder, and recalled LHP Scott Elbert from AAA Albuquerque.
- On May 13, optioned IF Iván DeJesús Jr. to AAA Albuquerque, transferred C Héctor Giménez from the 15-day disabled list to the 60-day disabled list, and purchased the contract of IF Juan Castro from AAA Albuquerque.
- On May 15, placed RHP Blake Hawksworth on the 15-day disabled list, and recalled RHP Javy Guerra from AA Chattanooga.
- On May 19, placed RHP Vicente Padilla on the 15-day disabled list, retroactive to May 14, with a strained right forearm, and recalled RHP Ramón Troncoso from AAA Albuquerque.
- On May 22, placed IF Juan Uribe on the 15-day disabled list, retroactive to May 20, with a strained left hip flexor, and recalled IF Rafael Furcal from the 15-day disabled list.
- On May 24, designed RHP Lance Cormier for assignment, and purchased the contract of RHP Rubby De La Rosa from AA Chattanooga.
- On May 27, activated IF Casey Blake from the 15-day disabled list, and optioned INF Russ Mitchell to AAA Albuquerque.
- On May 29, placed RHP Kenley Jansen on the 15-day disabled list with shoulder inflammation, purchased the contract of RHP Josh Lindblom from AA Chattanooga, and designated RHP Travis Schlichting for assignment.

=== June 2011 ===
- On June 4, placed RHP Jon Garland on the 15-day disabled list with right shoulder inflammation, placed IF Rafael Furcal on the 15-day disabled list with a strained left oblique muscle, and recalled RHP John Ely and IF Iván DeJesús Jr. from AAA Albuquerque.
- On June 6, designated IF Juan Castro and OF Jay Gibbons for assignment, optioned RHP John Ely and IF Iván DeJesús Jr. to AAA Albuquerque, purchased the contract of IF Dee Gordon from AAA Albuquerque, and activated OF Marcus Thames, IF Juan Uribe, and RHP Blake Hawksworth from the 15-day disabled list.
- On June 9, optioned OF Jerry Sands to AAA Albuquerque, outrighted RHP Luis Vasquez to A Rancho Cucamonga, and purchased the contract of OF Trent Oeltjen from AAA Albuquerque.
- On June 10, activated C Héctor Giménez from the 60-day disabled list and outrighted him to AA Chattanooga.
- On June 18, optioned RHP Josh Lindblom to AA Chattanooga, and activated RHP Kenley Jansen from the 15-day disabled list.
- On June 19, placed C Rod Barajas on the 15-day disabled list with a sprained right ankle, optioned RHP Ramón Troncoso to AAA Albuquerque, recalled C A. J. Ellis from AAA Albuquerque, and activated LHP Hong-Chih Kuo from the 15-day disabled list.

=== July 2011 ===
- On July 3, placed IF Casey Blake on the 15-day disabled list with an arthritic neck, and activated SS Rafael Furcal from the 15-day disabled list.
- On July 3, optioned SS Dee Gordon to AAA Albuquerque, and purchased the contract of IF/OF Eugenio Vélez from AAA Albuquerque.
- On July 12, acquired OF Juan Rivera from the Toronto Blue Jays for a player to be named later or cash and designated OF Marcus Thames for assignment.
- On July 15, activated C Rod Barajas from the 15-day disabled list, and optioned C A. J. Ellis to AAA Albuquerque.
- On July 29, placed RHP Kenley Jansen on the 15-day disabled list with an irregular heartbeat, and recalled RHP Josh Lindblom from AA Chattanooga.
- On July 30, placed IF Juan Uribe on the 15-day disabled list with a left hip strain, retroactive to July 24, and activated IF Casey Blake from the 15-day disabled list.
- On July 31, traded SS Rafael Furcal and cash considerations to the St. Louis Cardinals for minor league OF Alex Castellanos. Recalled IF Dee Gordon from AAA Albuquerque.

=== August 2011 ===
- On August 1, placed RHP Rubby De La Rosa on the 15-day disabled list with right elbow inflammation, and recalled RHP John Ely from AAA Albuquerque.
- On August 6, optioned RHP John Ely to AAA Albuquerque, and purchased the contract of RHP Nathan Eovaldi from AA Chattanooga.
- On August 10, placed SS Dee Gordon on the disabled list.
- On August 12, purchased the contract of SS Justin Sellers from AAA Albuquerque.
- On August 23, designated C Dioner Navarro for assignment, and recalled C A. J. Ellis from AAA Albuquerque.
- On August 24, optioned RHP Josh Lindblom to AA Chattanooga, and activated RHP Kenley Jansen from the disabled list.
- On August 31, placed RHP Matt Guerrier on paternity leave, and recalled RHP Josh Lindblom from AA Chattanooga.

=== September 2011 ===
- On September 1, activated SS Dee Gordon from the 15-day disabled list, recalled 3B Russ Mitchell from AAA Albuquerque and purchased the contract of LHP Dana Eveland from AAA Albuquerque.
- On September 4, recalled RHP Ramon Troncoso from AAA Albuquerque.
- On September 6, recalled RHP John Ely and OF Jerry Sands from AAA Albuquerque, and purchased the contract of C Tim Federowicz from AAA Albuquerque. Transferred RHP Vicente Padilla from the 15-day disabled list to the 60-day disabled list.

== Farm system ==
Level	Team	League	Manager	W	L	Position
AAA	Albuquerque Isotopes	Pacific Coast League	Lorenzo Bundy	70	74	2nd place
AA	Chattanooga Lookouts	Southern League	Carlos Subero	77	62	2nd Place; Lost in playoffs
High A	Rancho Cucamonga Quakes	California League	Juan Bustabad	80	60	1st Place; Lost in playoffs
A	Great Lakes Loons	Midwest League	John Shoemaker	72	67	4th Place
Rookie	Ogden Raptors	Pioneer League	Damon Berryhill	41	35	2nd place Lost in finals
Rookie	Arizona League Dodgers	Arizona League	Jody Reed	34	22	1st Place; League champions
Rookie	DSL Dodgers	Dominican Summer League	Pedro Mega	40	29	2nd Place

=== Minor League notes ===
- For the 2011 season, the Dodgers chose to replace their Class-A California League affiliate. The Rancho Cucamonga Quakes became the new affiliate, replacing the Inland Empire 66ers of San Bernardino.
- The Double A Chattanooga Lookouts clinched a playoff spot on August 29. They clinched the second half Southern League North Division title when the Tennessee Smokies lost on September 4. The Lookouts season came to an end when they were swept in the first round of the playoffs by the Smokies.
- The Advanced A Rancho Cucamonga Quakes clinched the first half California League pennant with a win over the Inland Empire 66ers of San Bernardino on June 14. The win assured the Quakes of a trip to the playoffs for the third consecutive season. The Quakes lost to the Lake Elsinore Storm 3 games to 1 in the second round of the playoffs.
- The Rookie-class Ogden Raptors clinched the first-half Pioneer League (baseball) championship and a playoff spot on July 30. The Raptors beat the Orem Owlz in the first round of the playoffs (winning 2 out of 3 games) to advance to the championship series. The Raptors were swept by the Great Falls Voyagers in the League Championship series.
- The Arizona League Dodgers beat the Arizona League Giants 4–2 on August 31 to win the championship of the Arizona League.
- Nine Dodger minor leaguers were selected to play in the Arizona Fall League. Pitchers Steve Ames, Stephen Fife, Cole St. Clair and Josh Wall, catcher Gorman Erickson, shortstop Jake Lemmerman and outfielders Alex Castellanos and Kyle Russell were selected to play for the Salt River Rafters while outfielder Angelo Songco was selected for the Surprise Saguaros.

=== Minor League statistical leaders ===
==== Batting ====
- Average:
  Joseph Winker – Ogden – .348
  Scott Van Slyke – Chattanooga – .348
- Home Runs:
  Jerry Sands–Albuquerque – 29
  Angelo Songco – Rancho Cucamonga – 29
- RBI: Angelo Songco – Rancho Cucamonga – 114
- OBP: Scott Van Slyke – Chattanooga – .427
- SLG: O'Koyea Dickson – Ogden – .603

==== Pitching ====
- ERA:Garrett Gould – Great Lakes – 2.40
- Wins:
  Dana Eveland – Albuquerque – 12
  Red Patterson – Rancho Cucamonga -12
  Will Savage – Chattanooga – 12
- Strikeouts:Red Patterson – Rancho Cucamonga – 172
- Saves:Logan Bawcom – Rancho Cucamonga – 27
- WHIP: Red Patterson – Rancho Cucamonga – 1.11

==== Mid-Season All-Stars ====
- Pacific Coast League All-Star team

Outfielder Trayvon Robinson (starter)
Pitcher Dana Eveland
Manager Lorenzo Bundy

Robinson also competed in the Triple-A version of the Home Run Derby.

- Southern League All-Star Game

Pitcher Cole St. Clair
Pitcher Nathan Eovaldi
Pitcher Will Savage
Pitcher Rubby De La Rosa (did not play due to promotion to Dodgers)
Pitcher Michael Antonini (replacement for De La Rosa)
First Baseman Scott Van Slyke
Outfielder Kyle Russell

Van Slyke won the "Top Star Award" after he was 2 for 4 with an RBI, a stolen base and two runs scored in the game.

- California League All-Star team

Catcher Gorman Erickson
Shortstop Jake Lemmerman
Outfielder Angelo Songco

- Midwest League All-Star team

Pitcher Red Patterson
Pitcher Garrett Gould
Pitcher Ryan Christensen

- All-Star Futures Game

Outfielder Alfredo Silverio – World Team
Coach Lorenzo Bundy – World Team

Silverio hit a two-run homer in the game, but the World team lost 6–4.

==== Post-season awards ====
- Dodgers Minor League Player of the Year

Scott Van Slyke

- Dodgers Minor League Pitcher of the Year

Shawn Tolleson

- Pacific Coast League All-Stars

Pitcher Dana Eveland

- Southern League All-Stars

Pitcher Nathan Eovaldi
Outfielder Alfredo Silverio
Outfielder/First Baseman Scott Van Slyke

- California League All-Stars

Pitcher JonMichael Redding
Outfielder Angelo Songco
Manager Juan Bustabad – Manager of the Year.

- Pioneer League All-Stars

Outfielder Joc Pederson

- Arizona League All-Stars

Outfielder Joseph Winker
Manager Jody Reed – Manager of the Year

== Major League Baseball draft ==
The Dodgers selected 50 players in this draft. Of those, seven of them have played Major League Baseball.

The first pick of this draft was left-handed pitcher Chris Reed from Stanford University. He was traded to the Miami Marlins in 2015 and pitched in two games in the majors for them that year, allowing two runs in four innings before announcing his retirement the following season.

2011 draft picks

Round	Name	Position	School	Signed	Career span	Highest level
1	Chris Reed	LHP	Stanford University	Yes	2011–2021	MLB
2	Alex Santana	3B	Mariner High School	Yes	2011–2015	A
3	Pratt Maynard	C	North Carolina State University	Yes	2011–2014	A+
4	Ryan O'Sullivan	RHP	Oklahoma City University	Yes	2011–2016	AA
5	Scott McGough	RHP	University of Oregon	Yes	2011–present	MLB
6	Scott Barlow	RHP	Golden Valley High School	Yes	2011–present	MLB
7	Scott Woodward	3B	Coastal Carolina University	Yes	2011–2014	Rookie
8	Rick Anton	LHP	University of Utah	Yes	2011	A
9	Tyler Ogle	C	University of Oklahoma	Yes	2011–2017	AAA
10	Jamaal Moore	LHP	Westchester High School	No		
11	Scott Wingo	SS	University of South Carolina	Yes	2011–2014	A+
12	O'Koyea Dickson	1B	Sonoma State University	Yes	2011–2019	MLB
13	David Palladino	RHP	Emerson High School	No; Yankees-2013	2013–2019	A+
14	Justin Boudreaux	SS	Southeastern Louisiana University	Yes	2011–2012	A
15	Craig Stem	RHP	Trevecca Nazarene University	Yes	2011–2019	AAA
16	Jeff Schaus	LF	Clemson University	Yes	2011	Rookie
17	Jesus Valdez	3B	Oxnard College	Yes	2011–2013	A
18	Chris O'Brien	C	Wichita State University	Yes	2011–2017	AAA
19	Garrett Bush	RHP	Seminole State College	No; Angels-2012	2012–2013	Rookie
20	Vince Spilker	RHP	Johnson County Community College	No; Diamondbacks-2012	2012	Rookie
21	Zak Qualls	LHP	Rancho High School	No		
22	Kyle Conwell	LF	Bellevue Community College	No		
23	Garrett Bolt	RHP	Western Illinois University	Yes	2011–2015	Rookie
24	Matt Shelton	RHP	Sam Houston State University	Yes	2011–2015	AAA
25	Travis Burnside	CF	Spartanburg Methodist College	No		
26	Freddie Cabrera	RHP	Central Methodist University	Yes	2011–2015	AA
27	Taylor Garrison	RHP	California State University, Fresno	No; Yankees-2012	2012–2015	AAA
28	Joseph Winker	LF	Mercer University	Yes	2011–2013	A
29	Joe Robinson	RHP	University of Nevada-Las Vegas	Yes	2012–2014	Rookie
30	Adam McConnell	SS	University of Richmond	No; Diamondbacks-2012	2012	A-
31	Mickey McConnell	SS	St. Mary's College of California	No		
32	Hunter Jennings	OF	Delgado Community College	No		
33	Malcolm Holland	2B	Hamilton High School	Yes	2011–2014	A
34	Robert Chamra	RHP	North Carolina State University	Yes	2011–2012	Rookie
35	Mike Thomas	LHP	Rider University	Yes	2012–2016	AAA
36	Kevin Taylor	2B	Western Nevada College	Yes	2011–2019	AA
37	Reid Redman	3B	Texas Tech University	No; Rays-2012	2012–2017	AA
38	Devin Shines	CF	Oklahoma State University	Yes	2011–2013	A+
39	Jordan Kipper	RHP	Mountain Pointe High School	No; Angels-2014	2014–2022	AAA
40	Stefan Jarrin	2B		Yes	2011–2012	Rookie
41	Casey Thomas	2B	Desert Vista High School	No; Athletics-2016	2016	Rookie
42	Max Povse	RHP	Green Hope High School	No; Braves-2014	2014–2023	MLB
43	Alex Hermeling	RHP	Glenbrook North High School	No	2016–2017	A+
44	Austin Slater	SS	The Bolles School	No; Giants-2014	2014–present	MLB
45	James Lynch	LF	Salisbury Prep	No; Blue Jays-2014	2014–2015	A-
46	Victor Munoz	C	Claremont High School	No		
47	Gregg Downing	LHP	Franklin Pierce University	Yes	2011–2013	A
48	Kevin Thompson	SS	Eastern New Mexico University	Yes	2011–2012	A+
49	JJ Ethel	C	University of Louisville	Yes	2011–2012	Rookie
50	Chris Ellis	RHP	Spain Park High School	No; Angels-2014	2014–2022	MLB
