= Justin Sellers =

American baseball player (born 1986)

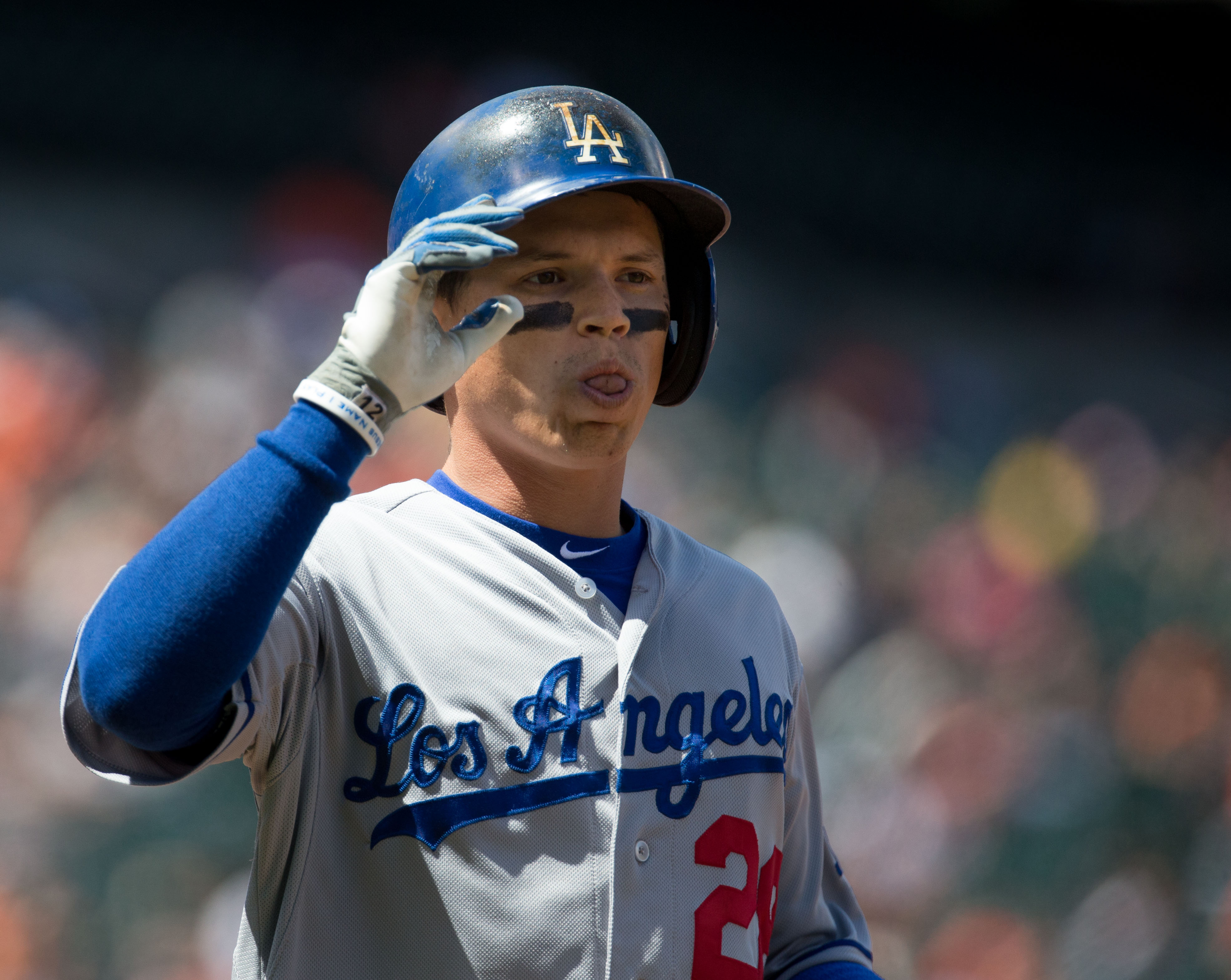
- Sellers with the Los Angeles Dodgers in 2013
- Infielder
- Born: February 1, 1986 (age 40); Bellflower, California, U.S.
- Batted: Right Threw: Right

MLB debut
- August 12, 2011, for the Los Angeles Dodgers

Last MLB appearance
- September 22, 2014, for the Cleveland Indians

MLB statistics
- Batting average: .198
- Home runs: 3
- Runs batted in: 17
- Stats at Baseball Reference

Teams
- Los Angeles Dodgers (2011–2013); Cleveland Indians (2014)

Justin Ryan Sellers (born February 1, 1986) is an American former professional baseball infielder. He played in Major League Baseball (MLB) for the Los Angeles Dodgers and Cleveland Indians. Primarily a shortstop, Sellers also played second base and third base.

== Professional career ==
=== Oakland Athletics ===
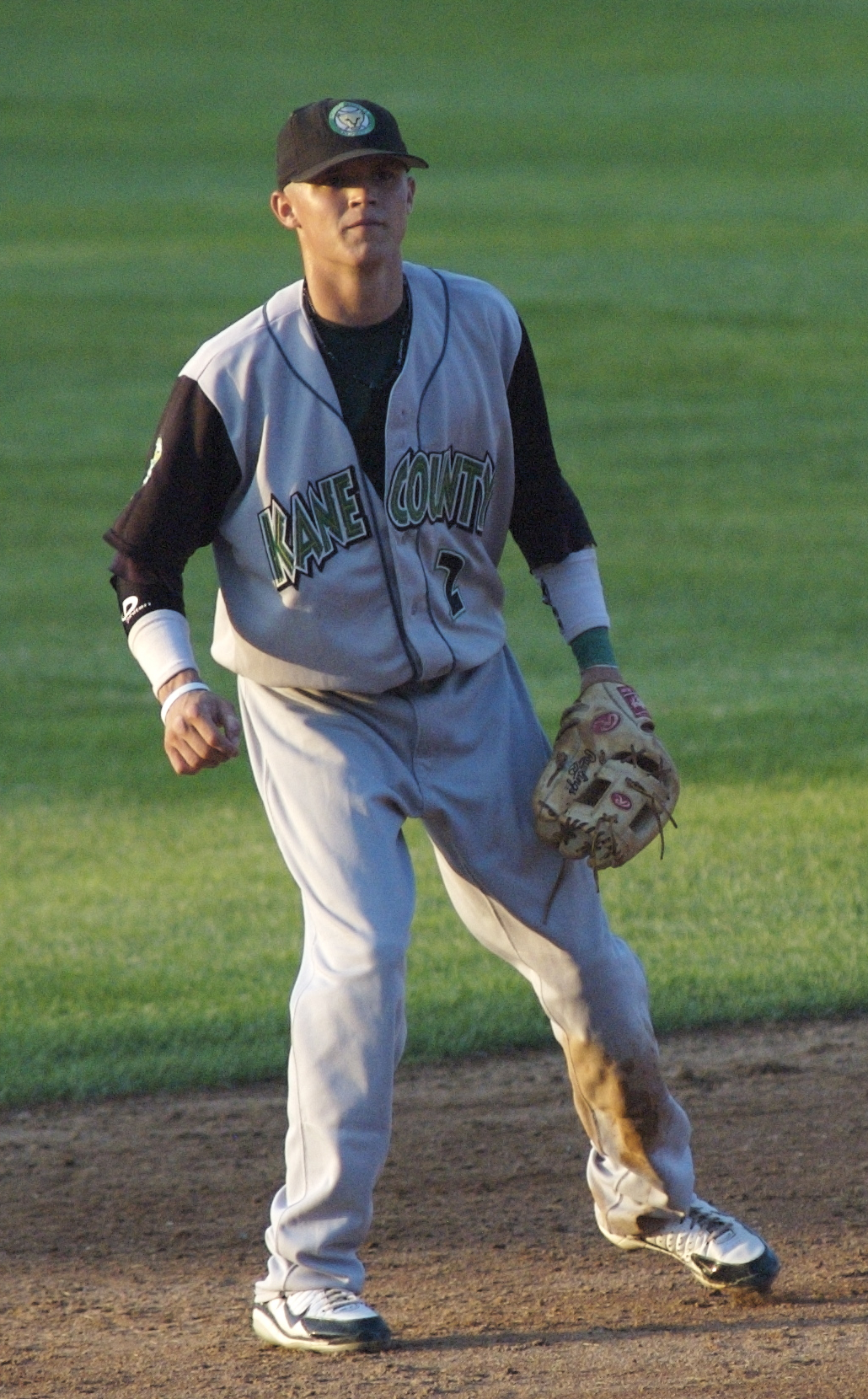
Sellers playing for the Kane County Cougars, single-A affiliates of the Oakland Athletics, in 2006

Sellers was drafted by the Oakland Athletics in the 6th round, with the 191st overall selection, of the 2005 MLB draft out of high school. He played with the Low-A Vancouver Canadians in 2005 and the Single-A Kane County Cougars in 2006. Sellers then split 2007 between the High-A Stockton Ports and Double-A Midland RockHounds. In the Hawaii Winter Baseball League, he was voted the 2007 Defensive Player of the Year. In 2008 at Midland, Sellers hit .255 in 123 games. He was traded to the Chicago Cubs on February 2, 2009, along with Richie Robnett, in exchange for Michael Wuertz.

=== Los Angeles Dodgers ===
The Cubs traded Sellers to the Los Angeles Dodgers on April 2, 2009, in exchange for future considerations.

In 2009, Sellers was selected to the Southern League all-star team, while hitting .280 with the Double-A Chattanooga Lookouts. He spent most of 2010 with the Triple-A Albuquerque Isotopes, hitting .285 in 90 games. In 2011, with the Isotopes, he was in 89 games and hit .304 with 14 home runs.

On August 12, 2011, he was called up to the Dodgers, replacing the injured Dee Gordon on the active roster. He was hitless in three at-bats as the starting shortstop against the Houston Astros in his debut that night. He collected his first hit the following day against Wandy Rodríguez and his first home run on the 14th against Jordan Lyles. He appeared in 36 games for the Dodgers, split between second base and shortstop, and hit .203.

Sellers began 2012 as a utility infielder for the Dodgers, appearing in 19 games and hitting .205. However, he experienced numbness in his right leg on May 24. He said that he thought the injury had originally occurred when he crashed into the stands to make a catch against the Arizona Diamondbacks the week before. He was placed on the disabled list the following day. After a lengthy period, Sellers played some rehab games with Single-A Rancho Cucamonga in early August but it was shut down after a few games due to lower back pain. It was determined that Sellers would need surgery on his lower back and that he would not be able to play again during the 2012 season.

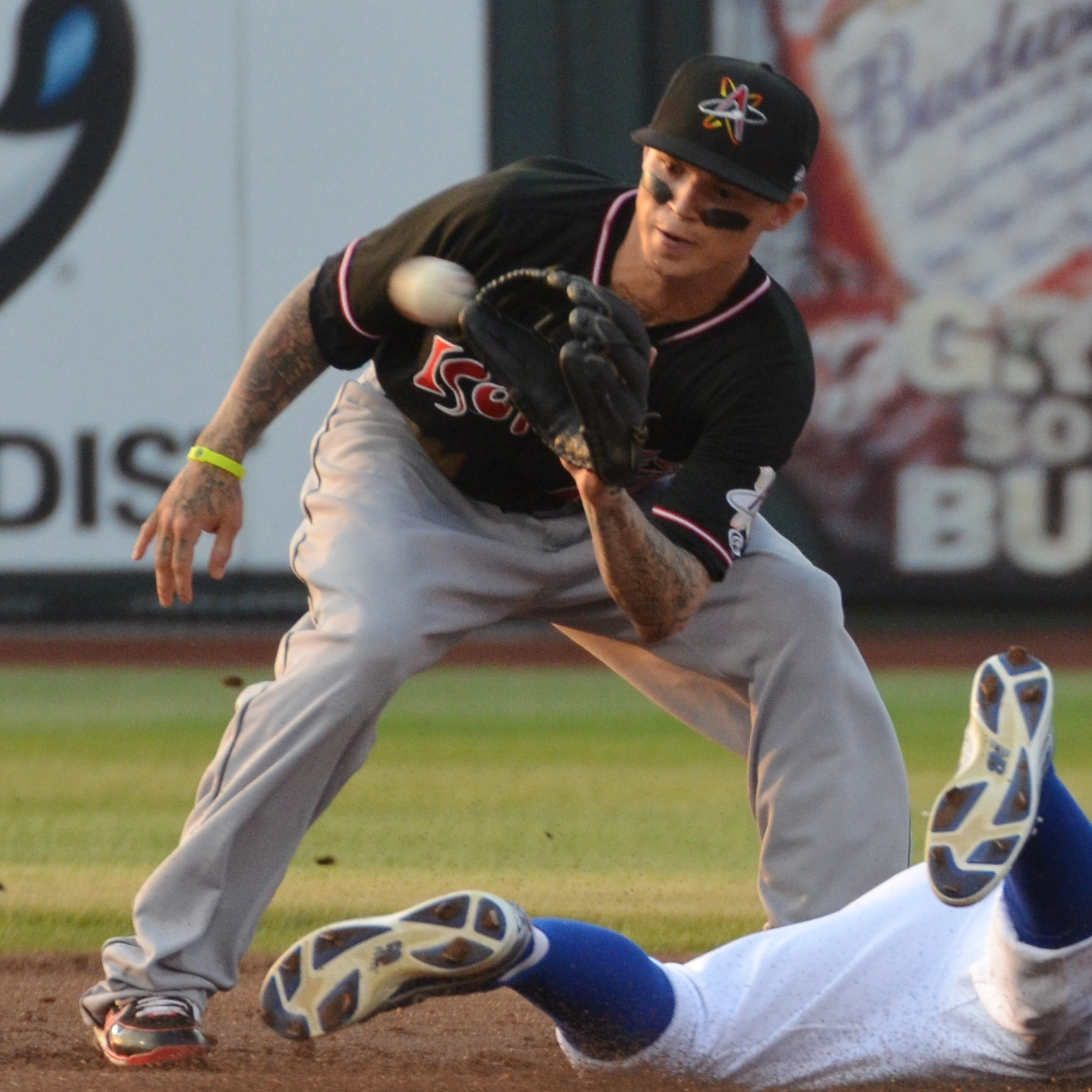
Sellers playing the Albuquerque Isotopes, triple-A affiliates of the Los Angeles Dodgers, in 2013

Sellers became the Dodgers opening day starter at shortstop in 2013 after Hanley Ramírez was injured during the 2013 World Baseball Classic. He hit only .188 in 27 games and was optioned back to Triple-A. In 89 games with the Isotopes, Sellers hit .270.

On February 22, 2014, Sellers was designated for assignment by the Dodgers following the signing of Erisbel Arruebarrena.

=== Cleveland Indians ===
Sellers was traded to the Cleveland Indians in exchange for cash considerations on March 2, 2014. He made 102 appearances for the Triple-A Columbus Clippers, hitting .254/.307/.335 with three home runs, 40 RBI, and three stolen bases. Sellers also played in 17 games for the Indians, going 3-for-22 (.136) with four RBI.

=== Pittsburgh Pirates ===
On October 25, 2014, Sellers was traded to the Pittsburgh Pirates in exchange for cash considerations. Sellers began the 2015 season on the disabled list due to an Achilles injury. On July 26, 2015, Sellers was activated off of the injured list; he was subsequently removed from the 40-man roster and sent outright to the Triple-A Indianapolis Indians. In four appearances for Indianapolis, he went 1-for-10 (.100) with two walks.

=== Chicago White Sox ===
On July 30, 2015, Sellers was traded to the Chicago White Sox in exchange for a player to be named later or cash considerations. In eight appearances for the Triple-A Charlotte Knights, he went 7-for-34 (.206) with two RBI.

=== San Diego Padres ===
On March 7, 2016, Sellers signed a minor league contract with the San Diego Padres organization. He was released prior to the start of the season on March 28.

== Personal life ==
Sellers is the son of former Boston Red Sox pitcher Jeff Sellers.

On January 19, 2013, Sellers was arrested in West Sacramento after police found him driving recklessly on his motorcycle. After a short chase, he turned himself in.

== See also ==
- List of second-generation Major League Baseball players
