= Red Patterson =

American baseball player (born 1987)

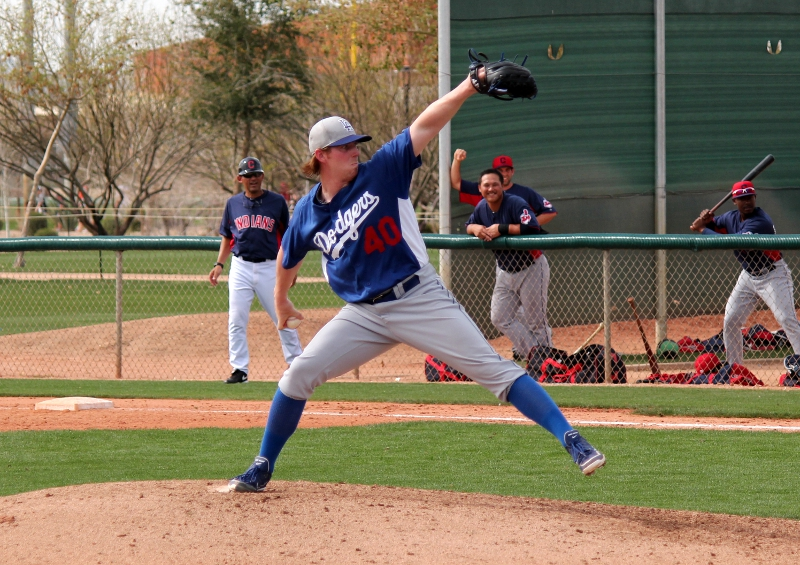
- Patterson with the Los Angeles Dodgers
- Pitcher
- Born: May 11, 1987 (age 39); Frisco, Texas, U.S.
- Batted: Right Threw: Right

MLB debut
- May 1, 2014, for the Los Angeles Dodgers

Last MLB appearance
- May 1, 2014, for the Los Angeles Dodgers

MLB statistics
- Win–loss record: 0–0
- Earned run average: 1.93
- Strikeouts: 1
- Stats at Baseball Reference

Teams
- Los Angeles Dodgers (2014)

John William "Red" Patterson (born May 11, 1987) is an American former professional baseball pitcher. He pitched in one Major League Baseball (MLB) game for the Los Angeles Dodgers in 2014 before his career was derailed by injury.

== Career ==
Patterson attended Southwestern Oklahoma State University and was drafted by the Dodgers in the 29th round of the 2010 Major League Baseball draft. He began his career with the Ogden Raptors in 2010, where he was 6-1 with a 3.33 ERA in 14 starts. He split 2011 between the Great Lakes Loons and the Rancho Cucamonga Quakes and was 12-5 with a 3.69 ERA in 28 starts between the two levels.

Patterson was promoted to the Double-A Chattanooga Lookouts in 2012, where he was moved to the bullpen and made 47 appearances, with a 7–1 record and 3.07 ERA. In 2013, with the Triple-A Albuquerque Isotopes, he was in 39 games (with 12 starts) and was 7–4 with a 3.03 ERA.

He was a non-roster invitee to Major League spring training in 2014. After beginning the season with the Isotopes, the Dodgers purchased his contract and called him up to make his Major League debut in the second game of a doubleheader on May 1, 2014, against the Minnesota Twins. In that game he pitched 4 2/3 innings and only allowed two hits and one run and strike out Pedro Florimon swinging for his only major league strikeout.

Patterson spent the rest of 2014 in the minors, where he made 20 starts for the Isotopes (and nine relief appearances). He finished with a 5–8 record and 5.79 ERA. Patterson was designated for assignment on September 12, 2014. Patterson underwent Tommy John surgery following the season and would spend all of 2015 in rehab. He was assigned to the Double-A Tulsa Drillers of the Texas League to begin his comeback attempt in 2016. He did not pitch for the Drillers, but allowed three runs in three innings in two games for the Triple-A Oklahoma City Dodgers and was released on May 6, 2016.
