= Héctor Giménez (baseball) =

Venezuelan baseball player (born 1982)

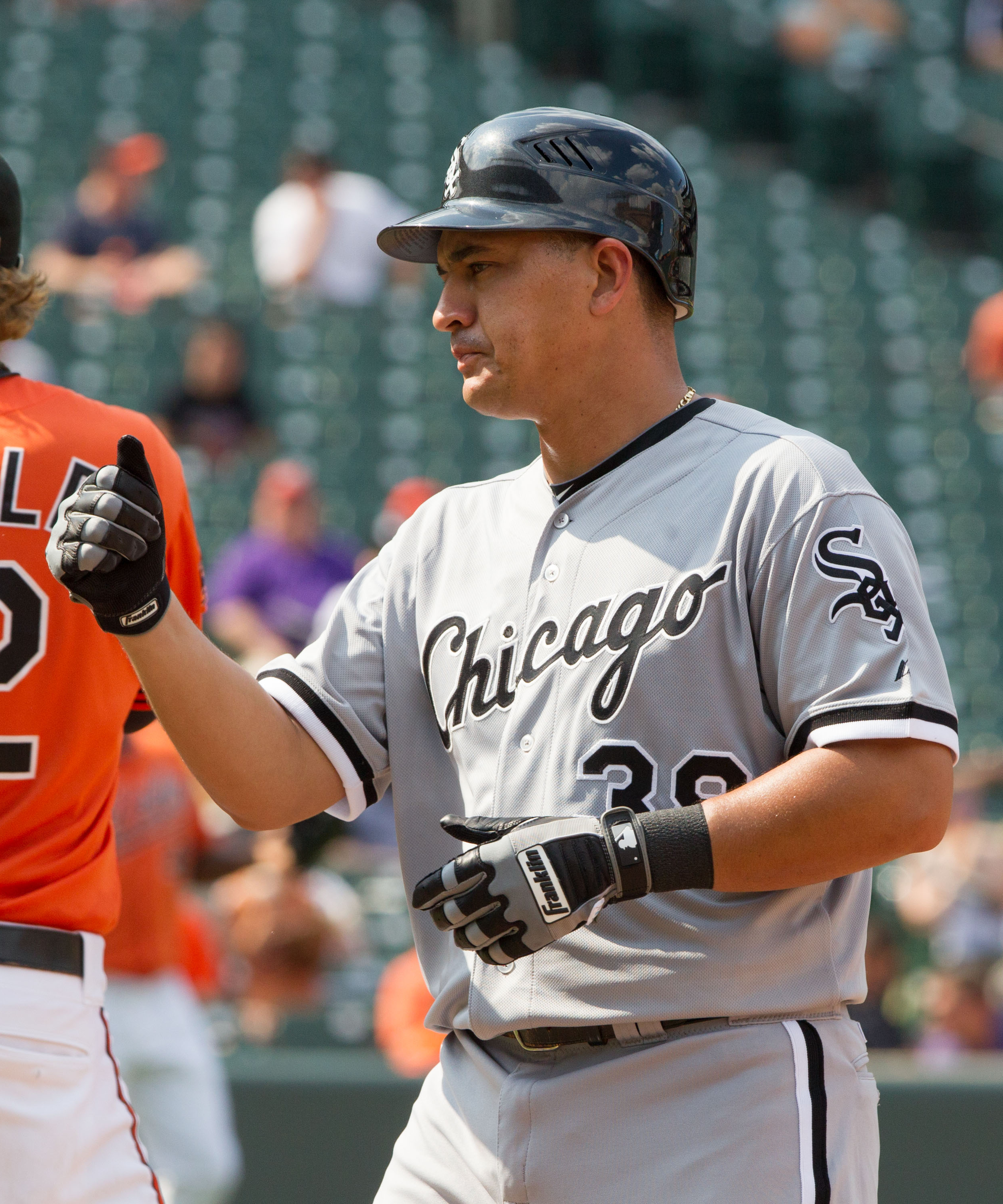
- Giménez with the Chicago White Sox
- Catcher
- Born: September 28, 1982 (age 43); San Felipe, Venezuela
- Batted: Switch Threw: Right

MLB debut
- September 25, 2006, for the Houston Astros

Last MLB appearance
- June 23, 2013, for the Chicago White Sox

MLB statistics
- Batting average: .216
- Home runs: 2
- Runs batted in: 11
- Stats at Baseball Reference

Teams
- Houston Astros (2006); Los Angeles Dodgers (2011); Chicago White Sox (2012–2013)

Héctor Eliner Carasco Giménez [Ec-tor he-MEH-nes] (born September 28, 1982) is a Venezuelan former professional baseball catcher. He played in Major League Baseball (MLB) for the Chicago White Sox, Houston Astros, and Los Angeles Dodgers.

== Professional career ==
=== Houston Astros ===
Giménez was signed by the Houston Astros as an amateur free agent in 1999. He spent two years in the Venezuelan Summer League before joining the Astros U.S. based minor league system. At one point, Giménez was ranked the best defensive catcher in the Houston Astros system, according to Baseball America. In 2005, he led the Corpus Christi Hooks with 58 RBI and earned Texas League All-Star honors. He hit .273 (75-for-275) with eight home runs and 37 RBI in 76 games for the Round Rock Express in his first season at the Triple-A level in 2006.

He made his major league debut with the Astros on September 25, 2006, striking out as a pinch hitter against the Philadelphia Phillies. He made one other major league appearance, also as a pinch hitter, against the Pittsburgh Pirates on September 27 and groundout to the shortstop.

On February 26, 2007, Giménez decided to have surgery to repair a torn rotator cuff and as a result, missed the entire 2007 season.

=== Tampa Bay Rays ===
On November 27, 2007, Giménez signed a minor league contract with the Tampa Bay Rays that included an invitation to spring training. He split the season between the High-A Vero Beach Devil Rays and the Triple-A Durham Bulls and then became a free agent at the end of the season.

=== Pittsburgh Pirates ===
He signed a minor league contract with the Pittsburgh Pirates in January 2009 and split the season between the Double-A Altoona Curve and Triple-A Indianapolis Indians. In 2010, he was with Altoona for the whole season and hit .305 in 94 games with 16 home runs, his highest total in any of his professional seasons.

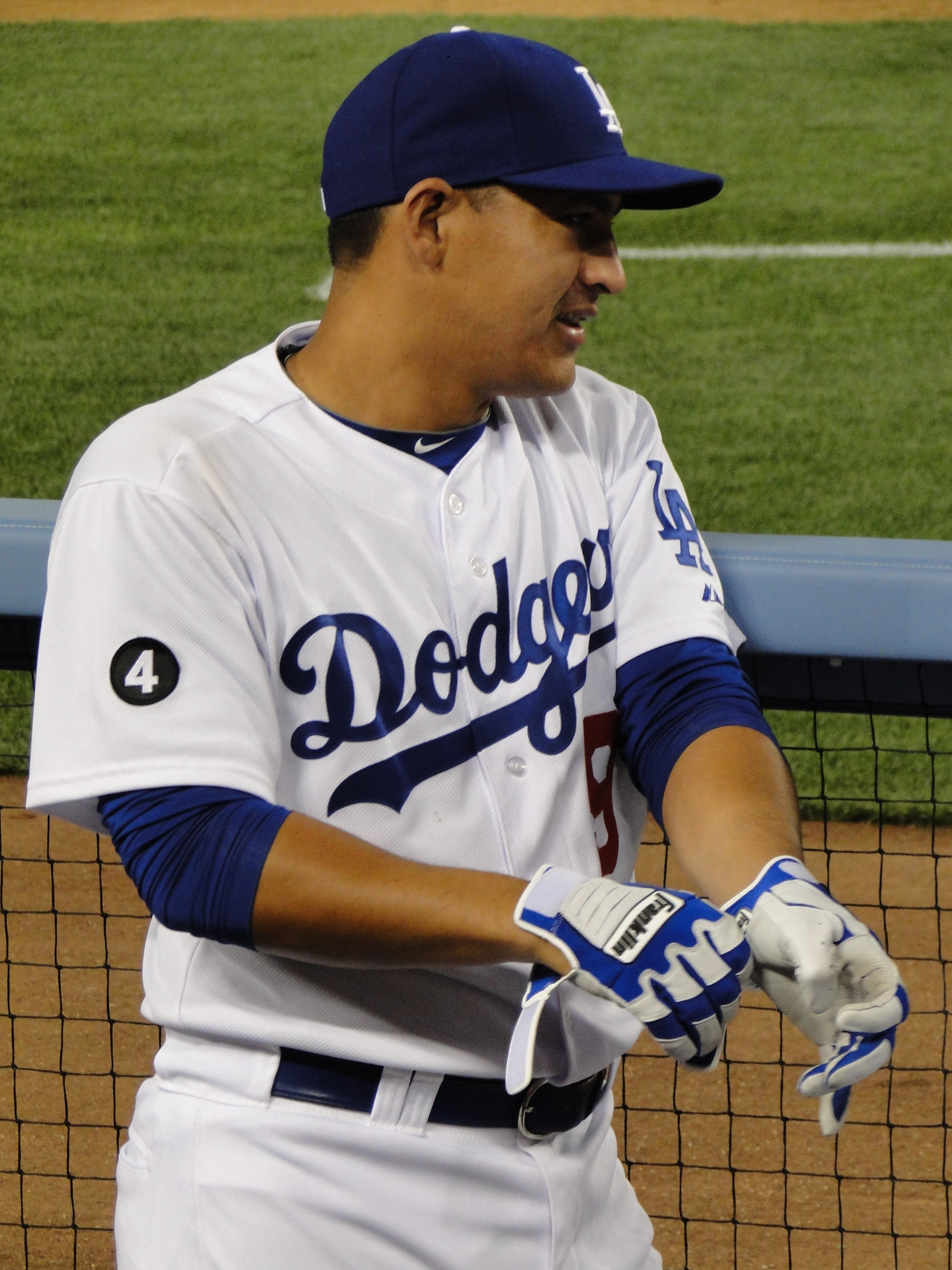
Giménez with the Dodgers in 2011.

=== Los Angeles Dodgers ===
He signed a minor league contract with the Los Angeles Dodgers in November 2010 but on November 19 he was purchased by the Dodgers and added to their 40-man roster. He appeared as a pinch hitter for the Dodgers on April 1, 2011, his first appearance in the Majors since 2006 with the Astros. He made his first career start the following day against the San Francisco Giants, and also recorded his first Major League hit, a single to left field in the seventh inning off Javier López. After appearing in four games, he was placed on the disabled list on April 10 and underwent arthroscopic knee surgery. He was activated off the DL on June 10 and outrighted to the AA Chattanooga Lookouts. He appeared in 66 games with the Lookouts, hitting .286 with 11 home runs and 54 RBI.

=== Chicago White Sox ===
He signed a minor league contract with the Chicago White Sox on January 15, 2012. He also received an invitation to spring training. He was designated for assignment on July 5, 2013.

=== Toronto Blue Jays ===
On May 25, 2014, Giménez was traded to the Toronto Blue Jays organization; he was subsequently assigned to the Triple-A Buffalo Bisons. He was later assigned to the Double-A New Hampshire Fisher Cats without playing for Buffalo. Giménez was promoted to Buffalo on June 16, and was released on July 14.

=== Milwaukee Brewers ===
On July 16, 2014, Giménez was signed to a minor league contract by the Milwaukee Brewers.

=== Leones de Yucatán ===
In 2015, Giménez signed with the Leones de Yucatán of the Mexican League. During the opening game at Kukulcán Alamo Park, he, along with Alfonso García, won 13-8 against the Diablos Rojos del México. Giménez became a free agent after the 2016 season.

== Coaching career ==
=== Tampa Bay Rays ===
In 2024, Giménez was named the manager of the Florida Complex League Rays, the rookie-level affiliate of the Tampa Bay Rays.

== See also ==
- List of Major League Baseball players from Venezuela
