= Russ Mitchell (baseball) =

American baseball player (born 1985)

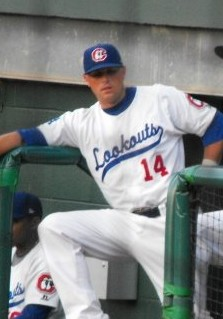
- Mitchell with the Chattanooga Lookouts in 2009
- Third baseman
- Born: February 15, 1985 (age 41); Rome, Georgia, U.S.
- Batted: Right Threw: Right

MLB debut
- September 8, 2010, for the Los Angeles Dodgers

Last MLB appearance
- September 24, 2011, for the Los Angeles Dodgers

MLB statistics
- Batting average: .151
- Home runs: 4
- Runs batted in: 7
- Stats at Baseball Reference

Teams
- Los Angeles Dodgers (2010–2011)

Russell Lance Mitchell (born February 15, 1985) is an American former Major League Baseball player who played for the Los Angeles Dodgers in 2010 and 2011. Primarily a third baseman, he also played first base and left field in the minor leagues.

== Professional career ==
=== Los Angeles Dodgers ===
A graduate of Cartersville High School in Cartersville, Georgia, Mitchell was selected by the Los Angeles Dodgers in the 15th round of the 2003 MLB draft. He was promptly assigned to the rookie level Gulf Coast Dodgers where he hit .338 in 26 games.

In 2004, he played with the Vero Beach Dodgers and Columbus Catfish. In 2005 with the Ogden Raptors he hit .289 with 13 home runs in 69 games and was named to the Pioneer League Post-Season All-Star Team. In 2006 with Columbus, he hit 15 home runs with 75 RBI and was selected to the South Atlantic League All-Star Game.

In 2007 with the Inland Empire 66ers he hit .324 with 22 homers and 82 RBI. He then played for the West Oahu CaneFires of the Hawaii Winter Baseball league following the season.

In 2008, he played with the Double-A Jacksonville Suns and in 2009, he was with the Chattanooga Lookouts. He played in the Arizona Fall League after the 2009 season and was awarded the "Dernell Stenson Sportsmanship Award." He also received an invitation to Major League camp for 2010 spring training. He was assigned to the Triple-A Albuquerque Isotopes to start the season. In 126 games with the Isotopes in 2010, he hit .315 with 23 home runs and was selected to the PCL Post-season All-Star team.

On September 6, 2010, Mitchell was added to the 40-man roster and called up to the Dodgers. He made his Major League debut on September 8 against the San Diego Padres. He started at first base but did not record a hit in two at-bats.

Mitchell's first Major League hit was a home run off San Francisco Giants pitcher Jonathan Sánchez on September 16, 2010. His second career hit was also a home run, this time off Franklin Morales of the Colorado Rockies two days later. He was the first Los Angeles Dodger player in history to hit home runs as his first two major league hits. He appeared in 15 games for the Dodgers, recording 6 hits in 42 at bats for a .143 average.

In 2011, he was assigned to the Triple-A Albuquerque Isotopes to start the season. In his first 17 games, he hit .214 with three home runs. On April 29, he was called up to the Dodgers, and made headlines on May 20 in Chicago when, against the White Sox, he stepped to the plate with two outs in the 9th inning, and hit a solo home run to tie the game up at 3-3, leading the Dodgers to a 6-4 win in extra innings. On May 27, after 14 games with the Dodgers, he returned to the Isotopes as Dodgers regular Casey Blake returned from the disabled list. Mitchell played in 93 games with the Isotopes during the season, hitting .283 with 16 home runs. He returned to the Dodgers in September and on the season he played in 25 games, with a .157 average and 2 home runs. He played much of the 2011 season with a wrist injury, finally choosing to have surgery on September 27, ending his season a few days early. He was designated for assignment on February 6, 2012. He was released on March 29, 2012.

=== Miami Marlins ===
On April 23, 2012 Mitchell signed a minor league contract with the Miami Marlins.

=== San Francisco Giants ===
On June 8, 2012 Mitchell signed a minor league contract with the San Francisco Giants. He was released on August 16, 2012.

=== Colorado Rockies ===
On December 15, 2012, Mitchell signed a minor league contract with the Colorado Rockies. He was released before the season started.

=== Sugar Land Skeeters ===
In 2013, Mitchell played for the Sugar Land Skeeters of the Atlantic League of Professional Baseball. He became a free agent after the 2013 season.

He nearly came back to baseball, but turned down a minor league offer from the Philadelphia Phillies in January 2016.
