= 2011 Houston Astros season =

50th season in Major League Baseball for the Houston Astros

2011 Houston Astros
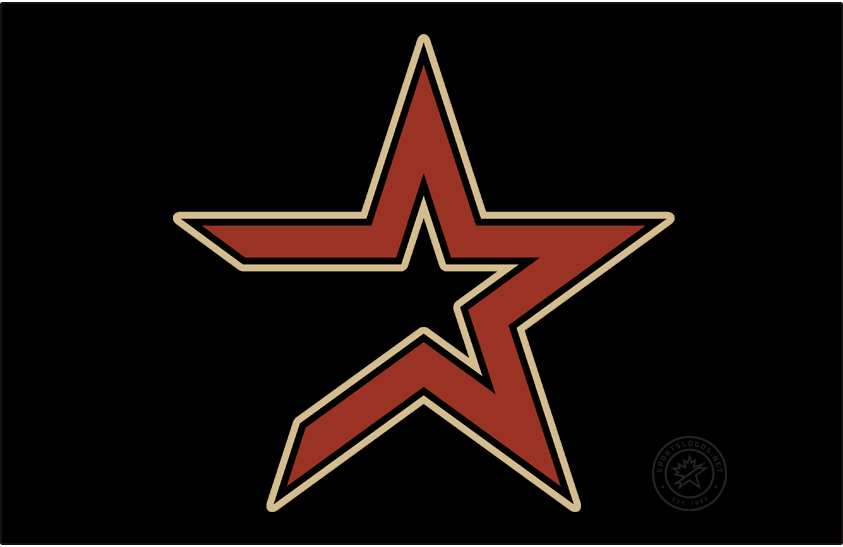
- League: National League
- Division: Central
- Ballpark: Minute Maid Park
- City: Houston, Texas
- Record: 56–106 (.346)
- Divisional place: 6th
- Owners: Drayton McLane
- General managers: Ed Wade
- Managers: Brad Mills
- Television: Fox Sports Houston; KTXH (Bill Brown, Jim Deshaies)
- Radio: KTRH (Milo Hamilton, Brett Dolan, Dave Raymond); KLAT (Spanish) (Francisco Romero, Alex Treviño)
- Stats: ESPN.com; Baseball Reference

The 2011 Houston Astros season was the 50th season for the Major League Baseball (MLB) franchise located in Houston, Texas, their 47th as the Astros, 50th in the National League (NL), 18th in the NL Central division, and 12th at Minute Maid Park. The Astros entered the season as having finished in fourth place in the NL Central with a 76–86 record and 15 games behind the division-champion Cincinnati Reds.

The Astros commenced the season on April 1 at Citizens Bank Park, when pitcher Brett Myers made the Opening Day start for Houston, but were defeated by the Philadelphia Phillies, 5–4. On May 16, the Astros announced a sale of the team to group of investors led by Jim Crane. In the amateur draft, the Astros' first round selection was outfielder George Springer at 11th overall, and subsequent picks included pitcher Adrian Houser in the second round, pitcher Nick Tropeano in the fifth round, and third baseman Matt Duffy in the 20th round.

Right fielder Hunter Pence was selected to the MLB All-Star Game and played for the National League, the second selection of his career. On August 16, Brian Bogusevic hit the 26th ultimate grand slam in major league history.

Houston concluded the 2011 season with a 56–106 record and in last place, 40 games behind the division-champion Milwaukee Brewers, and most defeats in the major leagues. This was the first time in the franchise's 50-year history that they had lost 100 games in a single season, surpassing the record of 97 jointly held by the 1965, 1975, and 1991 teams, and was surpassed again the following season. The 40 games behind first place at the time represented the second-most in franchise history to the 1975 club (43 1/2).

== Offseason ==
Summary

The Astros concluded the 2010 campaign with a 76–86 (.469) record, in fourth place in the NL Central division and 15 games behind the division-champion Cincinnati Reds. As the Astros' most recent winning season occurred in 2008 at 86–75 (.534), this was the first period since the 1990 and 1991 campaigns that Houston had assembled successive losing records. Center fielder Michael Bourn received his second consecutive Gold Glove Award, joining César Cedeño as Astros outfielders who have won the award (1972 to 1976).

Transactions

- February 17, 2011: Signed outfielder Teoscar Hernández as an international free agent.

== Regular season ==
=== Summary ===
==== April ====
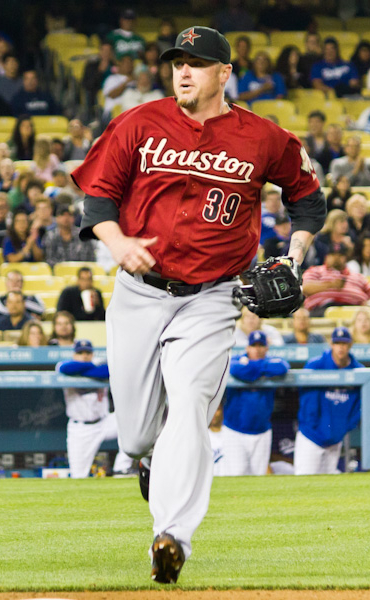
Opening Day starting pitcher Brett Myers during a game against the Los Angeles Dodgers in 2011.

Opening Day starting lineup
Uniform	Player	Position
21	Michael Bourn	Center fielder
36	Ángel Sánchez	Shortstop
9	Hunter Pence	Right fielder
45	Carlos Lee	Left fielder
22	Bill Hall	Second baseman
23	Chris Johnson	Third baseman
29	Brett Wallace	First baseman
77	Humberto Quintero	Catcher
39	Brett Myers	Pitcher
Venue: Citizens Bank Park • Philadelphia 5, Houston 4 Sources:

The Philadelphia Phillies hosted the Astros at Citizens Bank Park for Opening Day on April 1, where Philadelphia claimed a walk-off, 5-to-4 victory in the bottom of the ninth inning. Brett Myers made his first Opening Day start for Houston, and was opposed by reigning Cy Young Award winner Roy Halladay. Halladay departed after six innings with six strikeouts and one run allowed. The Astros struck first off Halladay during the top of the sixth, highlighted by a double from Hunter Pence. Myers, meanwhile, kept the Phillies scoreless through six. The Astros scored thrice more the seventh, capped by Michael Bourn's two-run triple. The lead runner on the play was Myers, who also collected two singles at the plate. The Phillies scored twice off Myers in the bottom of the seventh, who departed after that frame with Houston leading, 4–2. Brandon Lyon entered in the bottom of the ninth for the Astros, still leading, 4–2. Jimmy Rollins led off with a single, pilfered a base, and scored the first run of the inning as the Phillies produced six singles while Lyon managed just one out. The Phillies tied the game, and John Mayberry Jr. delivered a walk-off single that plated Ben Francisco for the game-winning run batted in (RBI). In game three on April 3, righty Roy Oswalt started, and won, his first career outing against his former club. Francisco and Ryan Howard backed Oswalt with home runs as the Phillies downed the Astros, 7–3, to sweep the Opening Series.

Following 11 seasons as an Astro, on April 26, Lance Berkman made his first return to Minute Maid Park as a visitor. Now a St. Louis Cardinal, Berkman received mainly applause. In the ninth inning, he ripped a go-ahead double, only to see the home team mount a comeback and win in it the bottom of the ninth, 6–5.

==== May ====
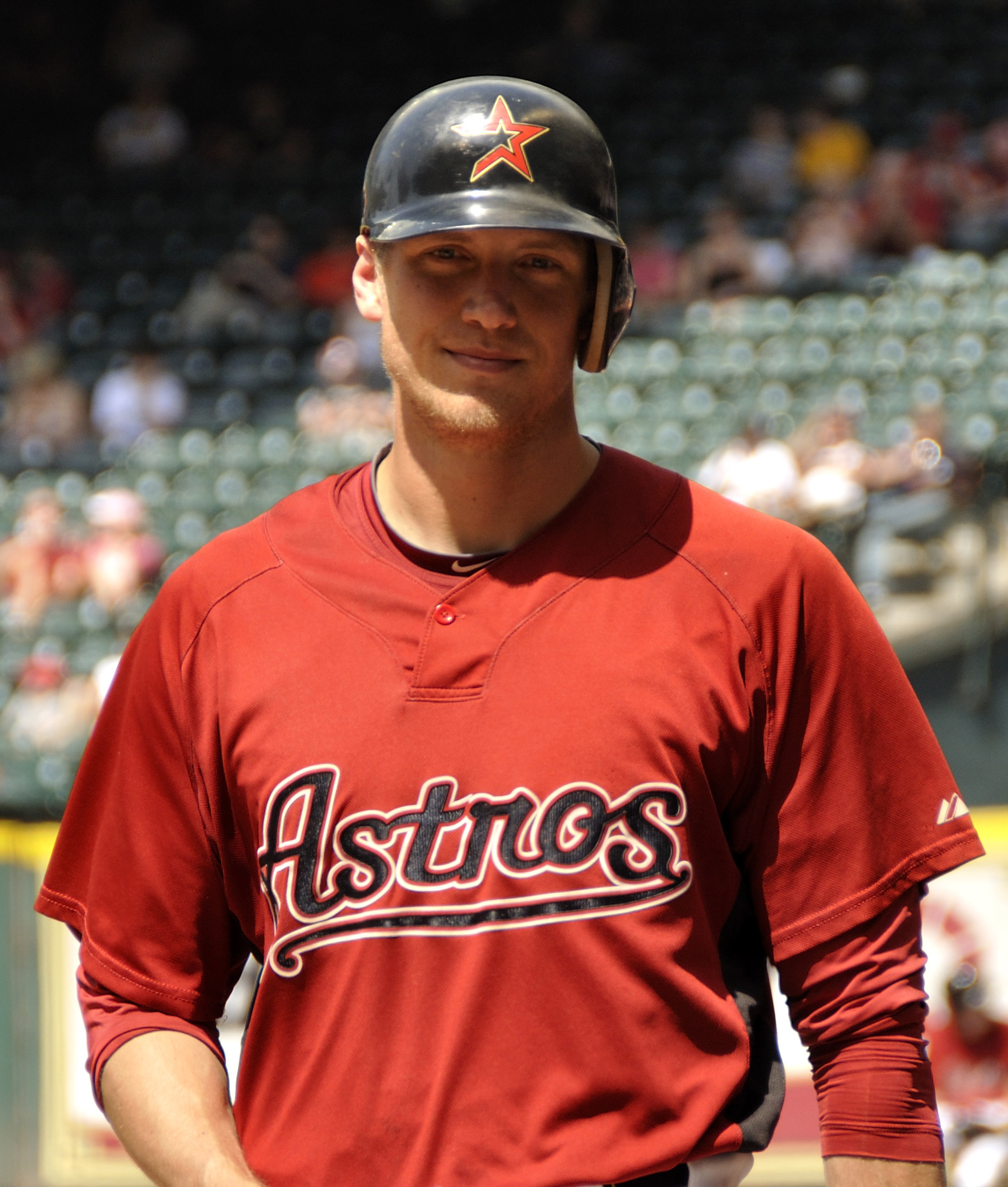
Hunter Pence with the Astros during the 2010 season.

The Astros announced on May 16 the sale of their team to a group of investors headed by Jim Crane for the price of $680 million. The Astros dropped a contest to the Atlanta Braves, 3–2, with Houston's record slipping to 15–26, worst in the National League. This date corresponded the approval of another sale of the team which took place in 1979.

Starting May 19 at Busch Stadium, outfielder Hunter Pence struck a single to left field off Kyle McClellan to launch a 23-game hitting streak and energize one of the dreariest seasons in club annals. His streak continued through a June 13th victory over Atlanta. Though he struggled with lower back pain, the All-Star batted .406 (39-for-96) with 19 runs scored, seven doubles, one triple, four home runs, and 19 runs batted in (RBI). The Astros posted a record of 10–13 (.435) during Pence's streak to play above their season average. The seventh hitting streak in club history to span at least 23 bouts, Pence thumped for the longest since Willy Taveras hit in a club-record 30 successive from July 27–August 27, 2006, while tying for fifth in the major leagues on the season. (Note: Tied with Ryan Braun of the Milwaukee Brewers. Criteria inclusive: Longest streak of consecutive games, in 2011, in the regular season, requiring hits ≥ 1, sorted by most games matching criteria.)

Jordan Lyles made his major league debut on May 31, hurling seven clean innings over the Chicago Cubs before his own error put him in line for the loss. The team proceeded to back him up, scoring six runs in the ninth to set up a 7–3 Astros victory.

==== June ====
Right-hander Bud Norris worked a no-hit bid into the seventh inning on June 8 versus the St. Louis Cardinal, which was interrupted by former Astro Lance Berkman's 14th home run of the campaign. Norris surrendered the home run to Berkman with two outs in the seventh inning, which resulted as the only blemish in an eight-inning, one-hit, one-run outing, to lead a 4–1 triumph for Houston. During the bottom of the third inning, Hunter Pence tripled home Jeff Keppinger off Cardinals starter Jaime García for the first tally of the contest. Jason Michaels swattted an RBI single during the bottom of fifth to increase Houston's lead to 3 to 0. Mark Melancon secured the final three outs to convert the save (6).

==== July ====
On July 19, the Astros promoted second base prospect Jose Altuve to the major leagues, who started and hit second for the first time the following day versus the Washington Nationals. Going 1-for-5 in his debut, Altuve singled off Tyler Clippard in the 9th inning for his first major league hit. Jason Michaels singled in Humberto Quintero in the bottom of the eleventh inning for a 3–2 walk-off Houston victory. Altuve authored a hitting streak that accounted for each of his first seven games, and, on July 27, 2011, tied an Astros franchise record with Russ Johnson for most successive games with a hit to start a career with 7, who accomplished his in 1997.

On July 25, Carlos Lee struck his seventh grand slam as a member of the Houston Astros to establish a club record, which surpassed Bob Aspromonte (1963–1966) and Jeff Bagwell (1998–2004), with six each. Lee's blast was off a P. J. Walters offering. Having previously connected for a grand slam off Walters on July 21, 2009, this batter—pitcher pairing of Lee and Walters made them the only opponents with more than one plate appearance where each had resulted in a grand slam. It was also Lee's 16th career grand slam, placing him ninth all-time. Lee's blast had cut Houston's deficit to 8–5 to the Cardinals in the top of the eighth. Altuve smoked his first two major league doubles, both off Kyle McClellan. However, Yadier Molina and Colby Rasmus went deep, while Molina also doubled as the Redbirds sailed to a 10–5 victory.

The Astros called up prospect J. D. Martinez on July 29 to replace Pence, who had been traded to the Philadelphia. Martinez started 52 of the remaining 55 games in the outfield for Houston.

==== August ====
On August 3, J. D. Martinez connected for his first major league home run, deep to off Dontrelle Willis during the bottom of the first at Minute Maid Park to also score Jason Bourgeois. Martinez also doubled and totaled three hits and four RBI to lead a 5–4 triumph over the Cincinnati Reds.

Brian Bogusevic crushed his first major league home run on August 9, off Jason Marquis of the Arizona Diamondbacks at Chase Field. Two batters prior to Bogusevic, J. D. Martinez had also homered. Carlos Lee walked, and Bogusevic followed with a deep drive to center field, increasing the Astros lead to 4–1. However, the Diamondbacks rallied. With two outs, the bases loaded in the eighth and Arizona leading, 9–8, right-hander David Hernandez stuck out Bogusevic swinging. The Diamondbacks won, 11–9.

==== Brian Bogusevic' ultimate grand slam ====
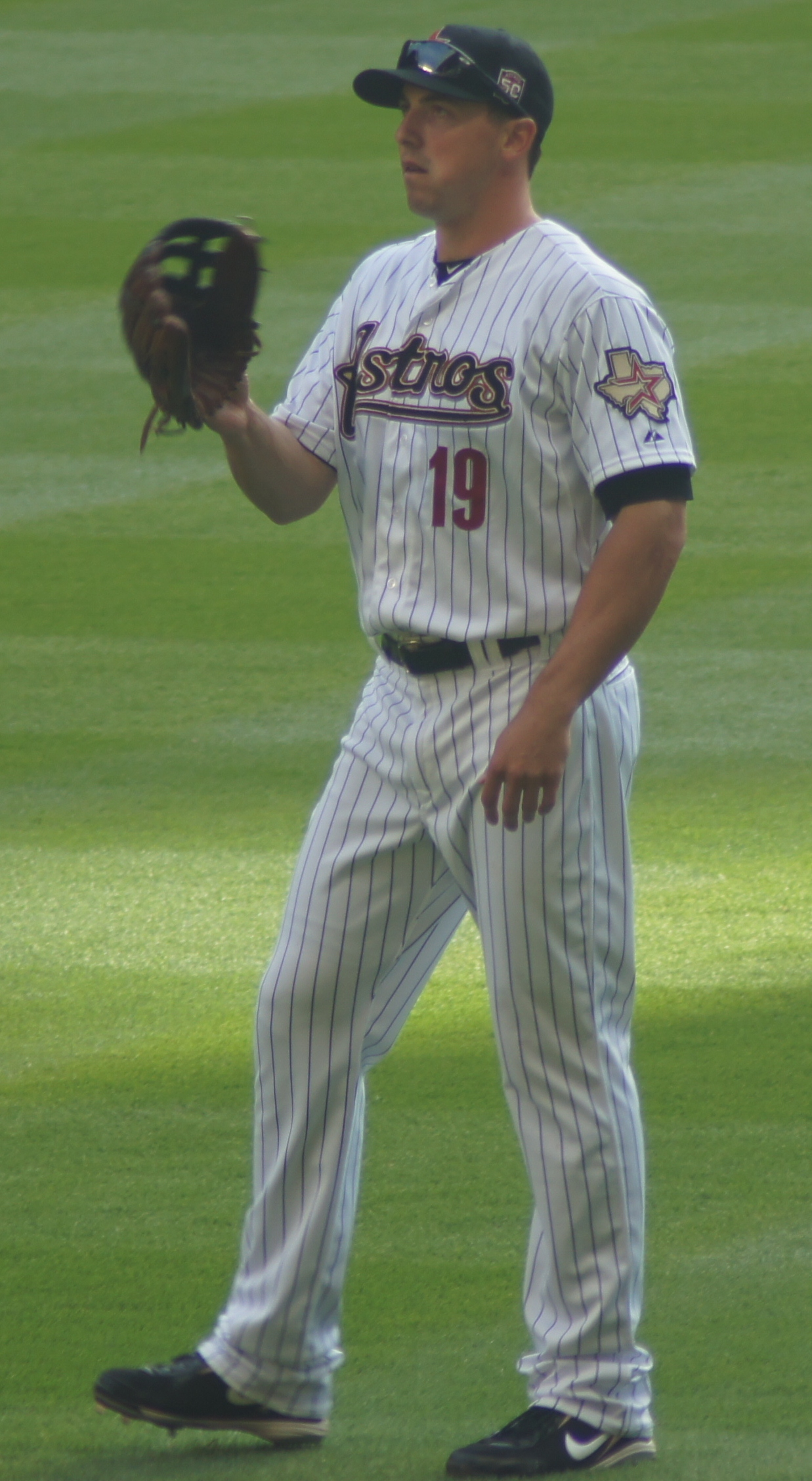
Brian Bogusevic in the outfield.

On August 16, pinch hitter Brian Bogusevic hit the 26th ultimate grand slam in major league history, and first in franchise history. Bogusevic connected off Chicago Cubs reliever Carlos Mármol for a 6–5 Houston victory. This was the Astros' lone walk-off home run of 2011. His second major league home run, this was the first and only of either a grand slam or walk-off home run during Bogusevic' career.

During the bottom of the seventh inning, catcher Humberto Quintero swatted a sacrifice fly that scored JB Shuck and reduced the Cubs' lead to 4–2. The Cubs regained the run in the top of the eighth when Aramis Ramírez led off the frame with a home run off Wilton López.

Leading off the bottom of the ninth, Jimmy Paredes lined out to left field against Mármol. Shuck followed with a ground ball single to right field. With Clint Barmes at the plate, Mármol threw a wild pitch, and Shuck to advanced to second. Barmes then stroked line drive single to left field and Shuck went to third. Matt Downs was inserted to pinch hit for Quintero and drew a walk to load the bases. Bogusevic then pinch hit for reliever Aneury Rodríguez and went deep off Mármol to end the contest, 6–5.

Rodríguez (1–4), who finished off the top of the ninth with the last two outs, earned the first and only victory of his major league career.

Prior to Bogusevic, Astros pinch hitters to have belted walk-off grand slams included Milt May on May 22, 1974, and Gregg Zaun on June 27, 2002. Carlos Lee had blasted the most-recent walk-off grand slam for Houston on June 28, 2007. (Note: The next walk-off grand slam by an Astros player was Jose Altuve's on June 15, 2021.) Two other ultimate grand slams transpired in 2011; hence, it became the first campaign in major league history in which as many as three ultimate grand slams occurred. Bogusevic was preceded by Travis Hafner of the Cleveland Indians on July 7, 2011, and succeeded by Ryan Roberts of the Diamondbacks on September 27, 2011.

==== Rest of August ====
On August 20, 2011, Altuve, leading off, stroked an inside-the-park home run for his first major league round tripper. J. D. Martinez had four runs batted in (RBI) to topple the San Francisco Giants at Minute Maid Park, 7–5. The triumph established a season-high four-game winning streak for Houston. Altuve collected three total hits and Martinez also homered and doubled. Altuve's inside-the-park homer was a landmark achievement. He followed Richie Ashburn as the second major leaguer to lead off a game with an inside-the-park home run for the first home of his career, who hit his on May 29, 1948. Altuve's blast was the first inside-the-park demolition at Minute Maid Park since Adam Everett on August 6, 2003. Third, the previous inside-the-parker for an Astros player to also be his first major league home run was by pitcher Butch Henry on May 8, 1992 at Three Rivers Stadium. Fourth, Bill Doran had been the most recent to lead off a game with this type of home run on April 22, 1987, against the Atlanta Braves.

With a 13-strikeout performance on August 29, Wandy Rodríguez became the fourth southpaw in club history to achieve this. (Note: Previously, Mike Cuellar, Denny Lemaster, and Randy Johnson. Criteria: Number of games in a career player meets criteria, throws LH, playing for HOU, in the regular season, requiring strikeouts ≥ 13, sorted by ascending instances.) Rodríguez' (10–9) effort induced a 7–4 defeat of the Pittsburgh Pirates, including striking out the side in the second and fourth innings. In the top of the fourth, Andrew McCutchen homered, and Ryan Doumit doubled in Neil Walker for a 3–0 Pirates lead. Rodríguez then pivoted to getting a swinging whiff each of Brandon Wood, Chase d'Arnaud, and Ross Ohlendorf. During the bottom of the fourth, Brian Bogusevic doubled in J. D. Martinez to push through Houston's first tally, Jordan Schafer singled in a run in the fifth, and in the seventh, Martinez procured an RBI fielder's choice prior to Carlos Lee connecting for a three-run blast (6 to 3, Astros), as the Astros held on for the triumph.

For the month of August, also his first in the major leagues, outfielder J. D. Martinez collected 28 RBI to set a franchise rookie record for any month, while ranking second in the National League.

==== September ====
On September 26, Ángel Sánchez executed the first bunt in club history that resulted in a walk-off hit, scoring Brian Bogusevic, while spoiling former Astro Octavio Dotel's attempt to maintain a tie score in extra innings. Thus, Houston toppled the St. Louis Cardinals, 5–4, in ten innings. (Note: This was fifth walk-off win which was decided on a bunt in club history. Each of the prior wins had resulted as the batter/runner reached on an error on the play and the winning run scored.) This was the Astros' final victory of the season.

==== Performance overview ====
The Astros concluded the 2011 campaign with a 56–106 record, for sixth and last place within the NL Central, trailing the division-champion Milwaukee Brewers by 40 games. The Astros' record was also the worst in the National League. The 106 defeats signaled the first season in franchise history with 100 or more, shattering the previous record of 97 shared by the 1965, 1975, and 1991 squads. Houston's third consecutive losing season, this was their longest such streak since their first seven years in competitive play, from 1962 to 1968. With their win total plummeting by 20 since 2010, this represented the largest downturn since 1999 to 2000 with 25. The total of number of defeats during their penultimate campaign in the National League grew the following season. The Astros hit 95 home runs as a team, the first time since 1992 in which they hit fewer than 100 home runs.

As the 2011 season signaled the continuation of transition for the franchise during their rebuilding process, they rostered a staggering 20 rookies who all played at some point during the season. Moreover, rookies assumed larger roles on the team during the second half. Matt Downs proved a reliable weapon off the bench, including garnering a major-league best pinch-hit 15 RBI.

The sale of the Astros from Drayton McLane to Jim Crane was formally approved on November 17, 2011, with the condition that the club move from the National League to join the American League in the West division beginning with the 2013 season. On November 28, the Astros fired team president Tal Smith and general manager (GM) Ed Wade. Assistant GM Dave Gottfried was chosen to serve as interim GM. Wade was hired in September 2007, while Smith had served as team president since 1994, and more than 30 of his 50 years as a baseball executive had been with the Astros.

=== League standings ===
==== National League Central ====
NL Central
Team	W	L	Pct.	GB	Home	Road
Milwaukee Brewers	96	66	.593	—	57‍–‍24	39‍–‍42
St. Louis Cardinals	90	72	.556	6	45‍–‍36	45‍–‍36
Cincinnati Reds	79	83	.488	17	42‍–‍39	37‍–‍44
Pittsburgh Pirates	72	90	.444	24	36‍–‍45	36‍–‍45
Chicago Cubs	71	91	.438	25	39‍–‍42	32‍–‍49
Houston Astros	56	106	.346	40	31‍–‍50	25‍–‍56

==== National League Wild Card ====
NL Wild Card standings

Division leaders
Team	W	L	Pct.
Philadelphia Phillies	102	60	.630
Milwaukee Brewers	96	66	.593
Arizona Diamondbacks	94	68	.580

Wild Card team (Top team qualifies for postseason)
Team	W	L	Pct.	GB
St. Louis Cardinals	90	72	.556	—
Atlanta Braves	89	73	.549	1
San Francisco Giants	86	76	.531	4
Los Angeles Dodgers	82	79	.509	7½
Washington Nationals	80	81	.497	9½
Cincinnati Reds	79	83	.488	11
New York Mets	77	85	.475	13
Colorado Rockies	73	89	.451	17
Florida Marlins	72	90	.444	18
Pittsburgh Pirates	72	90	.444	18
Chicago Cubs	71	91	.438	19
San Diego Padres	71	91	.438	19
Houston Astros	56	106	.346	34

==== Record versus opponents ====
National League

2011 National League record Source: MLB Standings Grid – 2011
Team	AZ	ATL	CHC	CIN	COL	FLA	HOU	LAD	MIL	NYM	PHI	PIT	SD	SF	STL	WSH	AL
Arizona	–	2–3	3–4	4–2	13–5	5–2	6–1	10–8	4–3	3–3	3–3	3–3	11–7	9–9	3–4	5–3	10–8
Atlanta	3–2	–	4–3	3–3	6–2	12–6	5–1	2–5	5–3	9–9	6–12	4–2	4–5	6–1	1–5	9–9	10–5
Chicago	4–3	3–4	–	7–11	2–4	3–3	8–7	3–3	6–10	4–2	2–5	8–8	3–3	5–4	5–10	3–4	5–10
Cincinnati	2–4	3–3	11–7	–	3–4	3–3	9–6	4–2	8–8	2–5	1–7	5–10	4–2	5–2	9–6	4–2	6–12
Colorado	5–13	2–6	4–2	4–3	–	3–3	5–2	9–9	3–6	5–2	1–4	4–3	9–9	5–13	2–4	4–3	8–7
Florida	2–5	6–12	3–3	3–3	3–3	–	6–1	3–3	0–7	9–9	6–12	6–0	0–7	4–2	2–6	11–7	8–10
Houston	1–6	1–5	7–8	6–9	2–5	1–6	–	4–5	3–12	3–3	2–4	7–11	3–5	4–3	5–10	3–3	4–11
Los Angeles	8–10	5–2	3–3	2–4	9–9	3–3	5–4	–	2–4	2–5	1–5	6–2	13–5	9–9	4–3	4–2	6–9
Milwaukee	3–4	3–5	10–6	8–8	6–3	7–0	12–3	4–2	–	4–2	3–4	12–3	3–2	3–3	9–9	3–3	6–9
New York	3–3	9–9	2–4	5–2	2–5	9–9	3–3	5–2	2–4	–	7–11	4–4	4–3	2–4	3–3	8–10	9–9
Philadelphia	3–3	12–6	5–2	7–1	4–1	12–6	4–2	5–1	4–3	11–7	–	4–2	7–1	4–3	3–6	8–10	9–6
Pittsburgh	3–3	2–4	8–8	10–5	3–4	0–6	11–7	2–6	3–12	4–4	2–4	–	2–4	3–3	7–9	4–4	8–7
San Diego	7–11	5–4	3–3	2–4	9–9	7–0	5–3	5–13	2–3	3–4	1–7	4–2	–	6–12	3–3	3–4	6–9
San Francisco	9–9	1–6	4–5	2–5	13–5	2–4	3–4	9–9	3–3	4–2	3–4	3–3	12–6	–	5–2	3–4	10–5
St. Louis	4–3	5–1	10–5	6–9	4–2	6–2	10–5	3–4	9–9	3–3	6–3	9–7	3–3	2–5	–	2–4	8–7
Washington	3–5	9–9	4–3	2–4	3–4	7–11	3–3	2–4	3–3	10–8	10–8	4–4	4–3	4–3	4–2	–	8–7

=== Detailed record ===
Team	Home	Away	Total	Pct.	Gms Left
NL Central
Cincinnati Reds	3–3	3–6	6–9	.400	0
Chicago Cubs	3–3	4–5	7–8	.467	0
Milwaukee Brewers	2–7	1–5	3–12	.200	0
Pittsburgh Pirates	4–5	3–6	7–11	.389	0
St. Louis Cardinals	3–6	2–4	5–10	.333	0
	15–33	13–17	28–50	.359	0
NL East
Atlanta Braves	1–3	0–2	1–5	.167	0
Florida Marlins	1–2	0–4	1–6	.143	0
New York Mets	1–2	2–1	3–3	.500	0
Philadelphia Phillies	2–1	0–3	2–4	.333	0
Washington Nationals	2–1	1–2	3–3	.500	0
	7–9	3–12	10–21	.323	0
NL West
Arizona Diamondbacks	0–3	1–3	1–6	.143	0
Colorado Rockies	2–2	0–3	2–5	.286	0
Los Angeles Dodgers	2–1	2–4	4–5	.444	0
San Diego Padres	2–2	1–3	3–5	.375	0
San Francisco Giants	2–1	2–2	4–3	.571	0
	8–9	6–15	14–24	.368	0
AL East
Baltimore Orioles	N/A	N/A	N/A	N/A	N/A
Boston Red Sox	0–3	N/A	0–3	.000	0
New York Yankees	N/A	N/A	N/A	N/A	N/A
Tampa Bay Rays	0–3	N/A	0–3	.000	0
Toronto Blue Jays	N/A	2–1	2–1	.667	0
	0–6	2–1	2–7	.222	0
AL Central
Chicago White Sox	N/A	N/A	N/A	N/A	N/A
Cleveland Indians	N/A	N/A	N/A	N/A	N/A
Detroit Tigers	N/A	N/A	N/A	N/A	N/A
Kansas City Royals	N/A	N/A	N/A	N/A	N/A
Minnesota Twins	N/A	N/A	N/A	N/A	N/A
	N/A	N/A	N/A	N/A	N/A
AL West
Los Angeles Angels	N/A	N/A	N/A	N/A	N/A
Oakland Athletics	N/A	N/A	N/A	N/A	N/A
Seattle Mariners	N/A	N/A	N/A	N/A	N/A
Texas Rangers	1–2	1–2	2–4	.333	0
	1–2	1–2	2–4	.333	0

Month	Games	Won	Lost	Pct.
April	27	10	17	.370
May	28	11	17	.393
June	26	7	19	.269
July	26	6	20	.250
August	29	12	17	.414
September	25	9	16	.360
	162	56	106	.346

Season Splits
Home/Road
Splits	Games	Won	Lost	Pct.
Home	81	31	50	.383
Road	81	25	56	.309
Season Half
Splits	Games	Won	Lost	Pct.
First Half	81	28	53	.346
Second Half	81	28	53	.346
Extra-Innings
Splits	Games	Won	Lost	Pct.
9-Inning	144	51	93	.354
Extra-Inning	18	5	13	.278
Run Differential Games
Splits	Games	Won	Lost	Pct.
One-Run	48	20	28	.417
2–4	71	21	50	.296
5+ Run	43	15	28	.349
Shut Outs
Splits	Games	Won	Lost	Pct.
Shut Out	19	7	12	.556
	162	56	106	.346

Monthly Attendance	Games	Total Att.	Avg. Att.	Pct.
April	15	380,208	25,347	18.39%
May	13	325,689	25,053	15.76%
June	16	419,856	26,241	20.31%
July	9	291,781	32,420	14.12%
August	15	358,453	23,897	17.34%
September	13	291,029	22,387	14.08%
Rank: 13th of 16	81	2,067,016	25,519	

=== Roster ===
2011 Houston Astros
Roster
Pitchers: 58 Fernando Abad; 68 Juan Abreu; 67 David Carpenter; 63 Xavier Cedeño; 66 Enerio Del Rosario; 52 Sergio Escalona; 28 Nelson Figueroa; 47 Jeff Fulchino; 30 J. A. Happ; 64 Lucas Harrell; 59 Wilton López; 41 Jordan Lyles; 37 Brandon Lyon; 54 Mark Melancon; 39 Brett Myers; 20 Bud Norris; 60 Lance Pendleton; 62 Aneury Rodríguez; 43 Fernando Rodriguez; 51 Wandy Rodríguez; 65 Henry Sosa; 60 José Valdez; 53 Wesley Wright	Catchers: 64 Robinson Cancel; 22 Carlos Corporán; 55 Humberto Quintero; 46 J. R. Towles; Infielders: 27 Jose Altuve; 12 Clint Barmes; 16 Matt Downs; 22 Bill Hall; 3 Joe Inglett; 23 Chris Johnson; 8 Jeff Keppinger; 38 Jimmy Paredes; 36 Ángel Sánchez; 29 Brett Wallace	Outfielders: 19 Brian Bogusevic; 11 Jason Bourgeois; 21 Michael Bourn; 3 Luis Durango; 45 Carlos Lee; 14 J. D. Martinez; 4 Jason Michaels; 9 Hunter Pence; 1 Jordan Schafer; 8 J. B. Shuck	Manager: 2 Brad Mills; Coaches: 38 Brad Arnsberg (pitching); 31 Mike Barnett (hitting); 26 Doug Brocail (pitching); 35 Dave Clark (third base); 10 Bobby Meacham (first base); 13 Al Pedrique (bench); 6 Jamie Quirk (bullpen)

=== Game log ===
Astros Win	Astros Loss	Game Postponed	ASG	Eliminated from Playoff Contention

2011 Game Log
April (10–17)

#	Date	Opponent	Score	Win	Loss	Save	Attendance	Stadium	Record	Boxscore / Streak
1	April 1	@Phillies	4–5	Báez (1–0)	Lyon (0–1)		45,237	Citizens Bank Park	0–1	L1
2	April 2	@Phillies	4–9	Lee (1–0)	W. Rodríguez (0–1)		45,455	Citizens Bank Park	0–2	L2
3	April 3	@Phillies	3–7	Oswalt (1–0)	Norris (0–1)		45,562	Citizens Bank Park	0–3	L3
4	April 5	@Reds	2–8	Leake (1–0)	Happ (0–1)		11,821	Great American Ball Park	0–4	L4
5	April 6	@Reds	4–12	Volquez (1–0)	Figueroa (0–1)		17,719	Great American Ball Park	0–5	L5
6	April 7	@Reds	3–2	Abad (1–0)	Masset (0–1)	Lyon (1)	20,104	Great American Ball Park	1–5	W1
7	April 8	Marlins	3–4	Nolasco (1–0)	López (0–1)	Núñez (2)	41,042	Minute Maid Park	1–6	L1
8	April 9	Marlins	5–7	Vasquez (1–1)	Abad (1–1)	Núñez (3)	25,421	Minute Maid Park	1–7	L2
9	April 10	Marlins	7–1	Happ (1–1)	Sánchez (0–1)		22,299	Minute Maid Park	2–7	W1
10	April 11	Cubs	4–5	Dempster (1–2)	Figueroa (0–2)	Mármol (4)	20,175	Minute Maid Park	2–8	L1
11	April 12	Cubs	11–2	Myers (1–0)	Russell (1–1)		23,523	Minute Maid Park	3–8	W1
12	April 13	Cubs	5–9	Zambrano (2–0)	W. Rodríguez (0–2)		20,987	Minute Maid Park	3–9	L1
13	April 14	Padres	1–0	Norris (1–1)	Moseley (0–3)	Lyon (2)	20,045	Minute Maid Park	4–9	W1
14	April 15	Padres	2–4	Harang (3–0)	Happ (1–2)	Bell (3)	23,755	Minute Maid Park	4–10	L1
15	April 16	Padres	5–3	Melancon (1–0)	Latos (0–2)	Lyon (3)	28,100	Minute Maid Park	5–10	W1
16	April 17	Padres	6–8	Frieri (1–1)	Melancon (1–1)	Bell (4)	22,899	Minute Maid Park	5–11	L1
17	April 19	@Mets	6–1	W. Rodríguez (1–2)	Niese (0–3)		27,032	Citi Field	6–11	W1
18	April 20	@Mets	4–3	Melancon (2–1)	Dickey (1–3)	Lyon (4)	27,380	Citi Field	7–11	W2
19	April 21	@Mets	1–9	Capuano (2–1)	Happ (1–3)		32,819	Citi Field	7–12	L1
20	April 22	@Brewers	7–14	Gallardo (2–1)	Figueroa (0–3)		31,907	Miller Park	7–13	L2
21	April 23	@Brewers	9–6 (10)	Lyon (1–1)	Green (0–1)		37,068	Miller Park	8–13	W1
22	April 24	@Brewers	1–4	Wolf (3–2)	W. Rodríguez (1–3)	Axford (4)	32,323	Miller Park	8–14	L1
23	April 26	Cardinals	6–5	Lyon (2–1)	Boggs (0–1)		25,526	Minute Maid Park	9–14	W1
24	April 27	Cardinals	5–6	Lohse (4–1)	Happ (1–4)	Sánchez (1)	27,857	Minute Maid Park	9–15	L1
25	April 28	Cardinals	7–11	McClellan (4–0)	Abad (1–2)	Salas (1)	26,331	Minute Maid Park	9–16	L2
26	April 29	Brewers	0–5	Marcum (3–1)	Myers (1–1)		25,734	Minute Maid Park	9–17	L3
27	April 30	Brewers	2–1	Lyon (3–1)	Loe (2–2)		26,514	Minute Maid Park	10–17	W1

May (11–17)

#	Date	Opponent	Score	Win	Loss	Save	Attendance	Stadium	Record	Boxscore / Streak
28	May 1	Brewers	5–0	Norris (2–1)	Narveson (1–2)		23,908	Minute Maid Park	11–17	W2
–	May 2	@Reds	Postponed (rain); Makeup: May 5, 11:35 AM CDT							Rain1
29	May 3	@Reds	10–4	Happ (2–4)	Leake (3–1)		12,005	Great American Ball Park	12–17	W3
30	May 4	@Reds	2–3	Cordero (2–0)	Lyon (3–2)		12,340	Great American Ball Park	12–18	L1
31	May 5	@Reds	4–10	Bailey (1–0)	Myers (1–2)		14,765	Great American Ball Park	12–19	L1
32	May 6	@Pirates	3–2	W. Rodríguez (2–3)	Resop (1–1)	Melancon (1)	12,728	PNC Park	13–19	W1
33	May 7	@Pirates	1–6	Morton (4–1)	Norris (2–2)		32,299	PNC Park	13–20	L1
34	May 8	@Pirates	4–5	McCutchen (1–0)	Abad (1–3)	Hanrahan (10)	17,946	PNC Park	13–21	L2
35	May 9	Reds	1–6	Wood (2–3)	A. Rodríguez (0–1)		20,174	Minute Maid Park	13–22	L3
36	May 10	Reds	7–3	Bailey (2–0)	Myers (1–3)		24,499	Minute Maid Park	13–23	L4
37	May 11	Reds	4–3	Melancon (3–1)	Leake (3–2)		21,008	Minute Maid Park	14–23	W1
38	May 13	Mets	4–6	Misch (1–0)	Fulchino (0–1)	Rodríguez (11)	28,791	Minute Maid Park	14–24	L1
39	May 14	Mets	7–3	Happ (3–4)	Dickey (1–5)		31,140	Minute Maid Park	15–24	W1
40	May 15	Mets	4–7	Capuano (3–4)	A. Rodríguez (0–2)	Rodríguez (12)	28,406	Minute Maid Park	15–25	L1
41	May 16	@Braves	2–3	Hanson (5–3)	Abad (1–4)	Kimbrel (11)	17,416	Turner Field	15–26	L2
42	May 17	@Braves	1–3 (11)	Gearrin (1–1)	Fulchino (0–2)		21,085	Turner Field	15–27	L3
43	May 18	@Cardinals	1–5	Lohse (5–2)	Norris (2–3)		35,298	Busch Stadium	15–28	L3
44	May 19	@Cardinals	2–4	McClellan (6–1)	Happ (3–5)	Salas(5)	36,409	Busch Stadium	15–29	L4
45	May 20	@Blue Jays	5–2	López (1–1)	Francisco (1–1)	Melancon (2)	15,478	Rogers Centre	16–29	W1
46	May 21	@Blue Jays	5–7	Janssen (1–0)	Myers (1–4)	Dotel (1)	21,494	Rogers Centre	16–30	L1
47	May 22	@Blue Jays	3–2	W. Rodríguez (3–3)	Drabek (3–3)	Melancon (3)	19,487	Rogers Centre	17–30	W1
48	May 23	Dodgers	4–3	Fulchino (1–2)	Jansen (1–1)		22,579	Minute Maid Park	18–30	W2
49	May 24	Dodgers	4–5	Billingsley (3–4)	Happ (3–6)		28,713	Minute Maid Park	18–31	L1
50	May 25	Dodgers	2–1	Melancon (4–1)	Guerrier (2–3)		21,350	Minute Maid Park	19–31	W1
51	May 27	Diamondbacks	6–7	Hudson (6–4)	López (1–2)	Putz (15)	21,834	Minute Maid Park	19–32	L1
52	May 28	Diamondbacks	3–11	Duke (1–0)	Norris (2–4)		31,405	Minute Maid Park	19–33	L2
53	May 29	Diamondbacks	2–4	Heilman (4–0)	Fulchino (1–3)	Putz (16)	21,882	Minute Maid Park	19–34	L3
54	May 30	@Cubs	12–7	Escalona (1–0)	Samardzija (3–1)		30,450	Wrigley Field	20–34	W1
55	May 31	@Cubs	7–3	F. Rodriguez (1–0)	Mármol (1–2)		31,178	Wrigley Field	21–34	W2

June (8–19)

#	Date	Opponent	Score	Win	Loss	Save	Attendance	Stadium	Record	Boxscore / Streak
56	June 1	@Cubs	3–1	Myers (2–4)	Davis (0–4)	Melancon (4)	31,340	Wrigley Field	22–34	W3
57	June 2	@Padres	7–4	Norris (3–4)	Stauffer (1–4)	Melancon (5)	16,635	Petco Park	23–34	W4
58	June 3	@Padres	1–3	Mosley (2–6)	Happ (3–7)	Bell (15)	20,056	Petco Park	23–35	L1
59	June 4	@Padres	3–6	Harang(6–2)	A. Rodríguez (0–3)	Bell (16)	28,208	Petco Park	23–36	L2
60	June 5	@Padres	2–7	Latos (4–6)	Lyles (0–1)		21,958	Petco Park	23–37	L3
61	June 7	Cardinals	4–7	Westbrook (6–3)	Myers (2–5)	Salas (11)	23,277	Minute Maid Park	23–38	L4
62	June 8	Cardinals	4–1	Norris (4–4)	García (6–2)	Melancon (6)	22,107	Minute Maid Park	24–38	W1
63	June 9	Cardinals	2–9	Lynn (1–1)	Happ (3–8)		24,482	Minute Maid Park	24–39	L1
64	June 10	Braves	4–11	Hudson (5–5)	A. Rodríguez (0–4)		29,252	Minute Maid Park	24–40	L2
65	June 11	Braves	3–6 (10)	Linebrink (2–1)	Lyon (3–3)		32,117	Minute Maid Park	24–41	L3
66	June 12	Braves	1–4	Hudson (8–4)	Myers (2–6)	Venters (3)	23,765	Minute Maid Park	24–42	L4
67	June 13	Braves	8–3	W. Rodríguez (4–3)	Lowe (3–5)		21,466	Minute Maid Park	25–42	W1
68	June 14	Pirates	0–1	Karstens (4–4)	Norris (4–5)	Hanrahan (18)	29,712	Minute Maid Park	25–43	L1
69	June 15	Pirates	3–7	Morton (7–3)	Del Rosario (0–1)	Hanrahan (19)	29,866	Minute Maid Park	25–44	L2
70	June 16	Pirates	4–5	McDonald (5–4)	Lyles (0–2)	Veras (1)	26,415	Minute Maid Park	25–45	L3
71	June 17	@Dodgers	7–3	Myers (3–6)	Lilly (5–6)		35,053	Dodger Stadium	26–45	W1
72	June 18	@Dodgers	7–0	W. Rodríguez (5–3)	De La Rosa (3–1)		36,124	Dodger Stadium	27–45	W2
73	June 19	@Dodgers	0–1	Guerrier (3–3)	López (1–3)	Guerra (2)	44,665	Dodger Stadium	27–46	L1
74	June 20	@Rangers	3–8	Holland (6–2)	Happ (3–9)		41,205	Rangers Ballpark in Arlington	27–47	L2
75	June 21	@Rangers	4–5 (11)	Tateyama (1–0)	Del Rosario (0–2)		33,533	Rangers Ballpark in Arlington	27–48	L3
76	June 22	@Rangers	5–3	Melancon (5–1)	Feliz (0–1)		39,708	Rangers Ballpark in Arlington	28–48	W1
77	June 24	Rays	1–5	Shields (8–4)	W. Rodríguez (5–4)		26,682	Minute Maid Park	28–49	L1
78	June 25	Rays	2–7	Davis (7–5)	Norris (4–6)	Farnsworth (16)	27,208	Minute Maid Park	28–50	L2
79	June 26	Rays	10–14	Howell (1–1)	López (1–4)		23,965	Minute Maid Park	28–51	L3
80	June 28	Rangers	3–7	Wilson (6–3)	Lyles (0–3)	Feliz (15)	29,132	Minute Maid Park	28–52	L4
81	June 29	Rangers	2–3	Lewis (7–7)	Myers (3–7)	Feliz (16)	24,472	Minute Maid Park	28–53	L5
82	June 30	Rangers	7–0	W. Rodríguez (6–4)	Harrison (6–7)		25,938	Minute Maid Park	29–53	W1

July (6–20)

#	Date	Opponent	Score	Win	Loss	Save	Attendance	Stadium	Record	Boxscore / Streak
83	July 1	Red Sox	5–7	Wheeler (1–1)	Escalona (1–1)	Papelbon (16)	36,279	Minute Maid Park	29–54	L1
84	July 2	Red Sox	4–10	Miller (2–0)	Happ (3–10)		39,021	Minute Maid Park	29–55	L2
85	July 3	Red Sox	1–2	Beckett (7–3)	Melancon (5–2)	Papelbon (17)	38,035	Minute Maid Park	29–56	L3
86	July 4	@Pirates	3–5	Maholm (5–9)	Myers (3–8)	Hanrahan (25)	36,942	PNC Park	29–57	L4
87	July 5	@Pirates	1–5	Karstens (7–4)	W. Rodríguez (6–5)		18,151	PNC Park	29–58	L5
88	July 6	@Pirates	8–2	Norris (5–6)	Morton (7–5)		18,910	PNC Park	30–58	W1
89	July 7	@Marlins	0–5	Hand (1–3)	Happ (3–11)		17,806	Sun Life Stadium	30–59	L1
90	July 8	@Marlins	3–6	Vázquez (5–8)	Lyles (0–4)	Núñez (24)	17,044	Sun Life Stadium	30–60	L2
91	July 9	@Marlins	1–6	Nolasco (6–5)	Myers (3–9)		20,402	Sun Life Stadium	30–61	L3
92	July 10	@Marlins	4–5	Volstad (5–8)	W. Rodríguez (6–6)	Núñez (25)	17,123	Sun Life Stadium	30–62	L4
–	July 12	82nd All-Star Game	National League 5, American League 1 (Phoenix, Arizona; Chase Field)							
93	July 15	Pirates	0–4	Karstens (8–4)	Myers (3–10)		27,787	Minute Maid Park	30–63	L5
94	July 16	Pirates	6–4	Escalona (2–1)	Veras (2–2)	Melancon (7)	35,081	Minute Maid Park	31–63	W1
95	July 17	Pirates	5–7 (11)	Leroux (1–0)	Melancon (5–3)	Resop (1)	24,580	Minute Maid Park	31–64	L1
96	July 18	Nationals	2–5	Marquis (8–4)	Lyles (0–5)	Storen (25)	28,975	Minute Maid Park	31–65	L2
97	July 19	Nationals	7–6	Happ (4–11)	Zimmermann (6–8)	Melancon (8)	32,418	Minute Maid Park	32–65	W1
98	July 20	Nationals	3–2 (11)	López (2–4)	Coffey (3–1)		29,605	Minute Maid Park	33–65	W2
99	July 22	@Cubs	2–4	Zambrano (7–5)	Norris (5–7)	Marshall (3)	39,855	Wrigley Field	33–66	L1
100	July 23	@Cubs	1–5	Wells (2–3)	W. Rodríguez (6–7)		40,486	Wrigley Field	33–67	L2
101	July 24	@Cubs	4–5 (10)	John Grabow (2–0)	Carpenter (0–1)		40,406	Wrigley Field	33–68	L3
102	July 25	@Cardinals	5–10	McClellan (7–6)	Happ (4–12)	Boggs (4)	38,074	Busch Stadium	33–69	L4
103	July 26	@Cardinals	1–3	Westbrook (9–4)	Myers (3–11)	Salas (19)	35,588	Busch Stadium	33–70	L5
104	July 27	@Cardinals	4–2	F. Rodriguez (2–0)	Boggs (0–3)	Melancon (9)	35,679	Busch Stadium	34–70	W1
105	July 28	@Cardinals	5–3	W. Rodríguez (7–7)	García (10–5)	Melancon (10)	38,794	Busch Stadium	35–70	W2
106	July 29	@Brewers	0–4	Wolf (7–8)	Lyles (0–6)		41,672	Miller Park	35–71	L1
107	July 30	@Brewers	2–6	Gallardo (12–7)	Happ (4–13)		44,306	Miller Park	35–72	L2
108	July 31	@Brewers	4–5	Rodríguez (4–2)	F. Rodríguez (2–1)	Axford (31)	41,738	Miller Park	35–73	L3

August (12–17)

#	Date	Opponent	Score	Win	Loss	Save	Attendance	Stadium	Record	Boxscore / Streak
109	August 1	Reds	4–3 (10)	Melancon (6–3)	Ondrusek (4–4)		21,502	Minute Maid Park	36–73	W1
110	August 2	Reds	1–5	Bailey (6–5)	W. Rodríguez (7–8)		22,603	Minute Maid Park	36–74	L1
111	August 3	Reds	5–4	Lyles (1–6)	Masset (1–5)	Melancon (11)	22,102	Minute Maid Park	37–74	W1
112	August 5	Brewers	1–8	Gallardo (13–7)	Happ (4–14)		25,811	Minute Maid Park	37–75	L1
113	August 6	Brewers	5–7	Narveson (8–6)	Myers (3–12)	Axford (32)	30,561	Minute Maid Park	37–76	L2
114	August 7	Brewers	3–7	Greinke (10–4)	Norris (5–8)		22,885	Minute Maid Park	37–77	L3
115	August 8	@Diamondbacks	9–1	W. Rodríguez (8–8)	Hudson (11–8)		17,448	Chase Field	38–77	W1
116	August 9	@Diamondbacks	9–11	Owings (6–0)	López (2–5)	Putz (27)	17,814	Chase Field	38–78	L1
117	August 10	@Diamondbacks	3–6	Collmenter (7–7)	Sosa (0–1)	Hernandez (10)	18,628	Chase Field	38–79	L2
118	August 11	@Diamondbacks	5–8 (10)	Putz (2–2)	Fulchino (1–4)		18,418	Chase Field	38–80	L3
119	August 12	@Dodgers	0–1 (10)	Lindblom (1–0)	Carpenter (0–2)		33,642	Dodger Stadium	38–81	L4
120	August 13	@Dodgers	1–6	Kershaw (14–5)	W. Rodríguez (8–9)		36,111	Dodger Stadium	38–82	L5
121	August 14	@Dodgers	0–7	Kuroda (8–14)	Lyles (1–7)		36,339	Dodger Stadium	38–83	L6
122	August 15	Cubs	3–4	López (4–3)	Sosa (0–2)	Wood (1)	20,138	Minute Maid Park	38–84	L7
123	August 16	Cubs	6–5	A. Rodríguez (1–4)	Mármol (2–4)		23,736	Minute Maid Park	39–84	W1
124	August 17	Cubs	4–3	Norris (6–8)	Coleman (2–5)	Melancon (12)	24,054	Minute Maid Park	40–84	W2
125	August 19	Giants	6–0	W. Rodríguez (9–9)	Vogelsong (10–3)		26,259	Minute Maid Park	41–84	W3
126	August 20	Giants	7–5	Lyles (2–7)	Bumgarner (7–12)	Melancon (13)	29,046	Minute Maid Park	42–84	W4
127	August 21	Giants	4–6 (11)	Affeldt (2–2)	Melancon (6–4)	Ramírez (3)	25,838	Minute Maid Park	42–85	L1
128	August 22	@Rockies	5–9	Chacín (10–10)	Myers (3–13)	Betancourt (3)	27,166	Coors Field	42–86	L1
129	August 23	@Rockies	6–8	Belisle (8–4)	F. Rodriguez (2–2)	Brothers (1)	31,179	Coors Field	42–87	L2
130	August 24	@Rockies	6–7 (10)	Belisle (9–4)	A. Rodríguez (1–5)		30,333	Coors Field	42–88	L3
131	August 25	@Giants	3–1	Sosa (1–2)	Vogelsong (10–4)	Melancon (14)	41,115	AT&T Park	43–88	W1
132	August 26	@Giants	1–2	Bumgarner (8–12)	Happ (4–15)	Casilla (2)	41,438	AT&T Park	43–89	L1
133	August 27	@Giants	1–2 (10)	Affeldt (3–2)	F. Rodriguez (2–3)		42,318	AT&T Park	43–90	L2
134	August 28	@Giants	4–3 (11)	Melancon (7–4)	Ramírez (2–3)	Carpenter (1)	41,681	AT&T Park	44–90	W1
135	August 29	Pirates	7–4	W. Rodríguez (10–9)	Grilli (1–1)	Melancon (15)	19,250	Minute Maid Park	45–90	W2
136	August 30	Pirates	8–2	Sosa (2–2)	Morton (9–8)		21,750	Minute Maid Park	46–90	W3
137	August 31	Pirates	2–0	Happ (5–15)	McDonald (8–7)	Melancon (16)	22,918	Minute Maid Park	47–90	W4

September (9–16)

#	Date	Opponent	Score	Win	Loss	Save	Attendance	Stadium	Record	Boxscore / Streak
138	September 2	Brewers	2–8	Greinke (14–5)	A. Rodríguez (1–6)		20,045	Minute Maid Park	47–91	L1
139	September 3	Brewers	2–8	Narveson (10–6)	Norris (6–9)		24,982	Minute Maid Park	47–92	L2
140	September 4	Brewers	0–4	Marcum (12–5)	W. Rodríguez (10–10)		21,976	Minute Maid Park	47–93	L3
141	September 5	@Pirates	1–3	McDonald (9–7)	Sosa (2–3)	Hanrahan (35)	13,366	PNC Park	47–94	L4
142	September 6	@Pirates	4–1	Myers (4–13)	Lincoln (1–2)	Melancon (17)	9,840	PNC Park	48–94	W1
143	September 7	@Pirates	4–5	Watson (2–2)	López (2–6)	Hanrahan (36)	12,330	PNC Park	48–95	L1
144	September 9	@Nationals	3–4	Clippard (3-0)	Harrell (0-1)		18,307	Nationals Park	48-96	L2
145	September 10	@Nationals	9–3	W. Rodríguez (11–10)	Lannan (9–12)		30,935	Nationals Park	49-96	W1
146	September 11	@Nationals	2–8	Gorzelanny (3–6)	Sosa (2–4)		24,238	Nationals Park	49-97	L1
147	September 12	Phillies	5–1	Myers (5–13)	Oswalt (7–9)		22,231	Minute Maid Park	50-97	W1
148	September 13	Phillies	5–2	Happ (6–15)	Hamels (14–8)		24,302	Minute Maid Park	51-97	W2
149	September 14	Phillies	0–1	Halladay (18–5)	Norris (6–10)		20,027	Minute Maid Park	51-98	L1
150	September 16	@Cubs	3–4	Samardzija (7–4)	Carpenter (0–3)		35,318	Wrigley Field	51-99	L2
151	September 17	@Cubs	1–2	López (6–6)	Sosa (2-5)	Marshall (5)	39,377	Wrigley Field	51-100	L3
152	September 18	@Cubs	3–2	Myers (6–13)	Dempster (10–13)	Melancon (18)	36,250	Wrigley Field	52-100	W1
153	September 19	@Reds	3–2	Carpenter (1–3)	Masset (3–6)	Melancon (19)	21,168	Great American Ball Park	53-100	W2
154	September 20	@Reds	4–6	Bailey (9–7)	Norris (6–11)	Cordero (34)	23,847	Great American Ball Park	53-101	L1
155	September 21	@Reds	0–2	Arroyo (9–12)	W. Rodríguez (11–11)		20,875	Great American Ball Park	53-102	L2
156	September 22	Rockies	9–6	Sosa (3-5)	White (3–3)	Melancon (20)	20,773	Minute Maid Park	54-102	W1
157	September 23	Rockies	11–2	Myers (7–13)	Pomeranz (1-1)		22,467	Minute Maid Park	55-102	W2
158	September 24	Rockies	2–4 (13)	Reynolds (1-2)	Lyles (2–8)	Betancourt (7)	26,209	Minute Maid Park	55-103	L1
159	September 25	Rockies	3–19	Millwood (4-3)	Harrell (0-2)		21,621	Minute Maid Park	55-104	L2
160	September 26	Cardinals	5–4 (10)	Melancon (8-4)	Dotel (18)		20,017	Minute Maid Park	56-104	W1
161	September 27	Cardinals	6–13	Sánchez (0–3)	Del Rosario (0–3)		22,021	Minute Maid Park	56-105	L1
162	September 28	Cardinals	0–8	Carpenter (11–9)	Myers (7–14)		24,358	Minute Maid Park	56-106	L2

== Player statistics ==
Table legend
*	Left-handed batter or pitcher	League leader (multiple teams)	League top ten (multiple teams)
#	Switch hitter	Team leader	League top ten (one team)
	Leader in appearances at position		

=== Batting ===
Abbreviations

- G — games played
- PA — plate appearances
- AB — at bats
- R — runs
- H — hits
- 2B — doubles
- 3B — triples
- HR — home runs
- RBI — runs batted in
- SB — stolen bases
- BB — base on balls
- AVG — batting average
- OBP — on-base percentage
- SLG — slugging percentage
- OPS — on-base plus slugging

Individual batting results
⌖	Player	G	PA	AB	R	H	2B	3B	HR	RBI	BB	SO	SB	AVG	OBP
C	Humberto Quintero	79	272	262	22	63	12	1	2	25	6	53	1	.240	.258
1B	Brett Wallace*	115	379	336	37	87	22	0	5	29	36	91	1	.259	.334
2B	Jose Altuve	57	234	221	26	61	10	1	2	12	5	29	7	.276	.297
3B	Chris Johnson	107	405	378	32	95	21	3	7	42	16	97	2	.251	.291
SS	Clint Barmes	123	495	446	47	109	27	0	12	39	38	88	3	.244	.312
LF	Carlos Lee	155	653	585	66	161	38	4	18	94	59	60	4	.275	.342
CF	Michael Bourn* ^{x}	105	473	429	64	130	26	7	1	32	38	90	39	.303	.363
RF	Hunter Pence ^{x}	100	432	399	49	123	26	3	11	62	30	86	7	.308	.356
SS	Angel Sanchez	110	328	288	35	69	10	0	1	28	27	44	3	.240	.305
CF	Jason Bourgeois	93	252	238	30	70	8	2	1	16	10	24	31	.294	.323
LF	J.D. Martinez	53	226	208	29	57	13	0	6	35	13	48	0	.274	.319
IF	Matt Downs	106	222	199	29	55	18	0	10	41	17	47	0	.276	.347
RF	Brian Bogusevic*	87	182	164	22	47	14	1	4	15	15	40	4	.287	.348
3B	Jimmy Paredes^{#}	46	179	168	16	48	8	2	2	18	9	47	5	.286	.320
C	Carlos Corporán^{#}	52	173	154	9	29	8	1	0	11	10	49	0	.188	.253
	Jeff Keppinger	43	170	163	22	50	9	0	4	20	4	7	0	.307	.320
	Jason Michaels	89	169	156	10	31	9	0	2	10	11	31	1	.199	.256
C	J.R. Towles	54	165	147	11	27	7	0	3	11	13	26	0	.184	.256
	Bill Hall	46	158	147	18	33	7	2	2	13	8	55	1	.224	.272
	Jordan Schafer*	30	118	106	14	26	4	0	1	6	10	28	7	.245	.314
	JB Shuck*	37	92	81	9	22	2	1	0	3	11	7	2	.272	.359
	Joe Inglett*	20	27	27	3	6	1	0	0	1	0	7	0	.222	.222
	Robinson Cancel	2	7	6	0	0	0	0	0	0	1	4	0	.000	.143
	Luis Durango^{#}	2	7	6	0	1	0	0	0	1	1	1	0	.167	.286
	Pitcher totals		332	284	15	42	9	0	1	15	13	105	0	.148	.185
Team totals		162	6150	5598	615	1442	309	28	95	579	401	1164	118	.258	.311
^{x}—Was not part of the team at end of the season • Sources:

=== Pitching ===
Abbreviations

- W — wins
- L — losses
- ERA — earned run average
- G — games pitched
- GS — games started
- SV — saves
- IP — innings pitched
- H — hits allowed
- R — runs allowed
- ER — earned runs allowed
- BB — base on balls allowed
- SO — strikeouts
- WHIP — walks plus hits per inning pitched

Individual pitching results
⌖	Player	W	L	ERA	G	GS	SV	IP	H	R	ER	HR	BB	SO
SP	Brett Myers	7	14	4.46	34	33	0	216.0	226	116	107	31	57	160
SP	Wandy Rodríguez*	11	11	3.49	30	30	0	191.0	182	81	74	25	69	166
SP	Bud Norris	6	11	3.77	31	31	0	186.0	177	93	78	24	70	176
SP	J. A. Happ	6	15	5.35	28	28	0	156.1	157	103	93	21	83	134
SP	Jordan Lyles	2	8	5.36	20	15	0	94.0	107	61	56	14	26	67
SP	Henry Sosa	3	5	5.23	10	10	0	53.1	54	31	31	7	23	38
	Aneury Rodríguez	1	6	5.27	43	8	0	85.1	83	57	50	13	32	64
	Mark Melancon	8	4	2.78	71	0	20	74.1	65	28	23	5	26	66
	Wilton López	2	6	2.79	73	0	0	71.0	72	26	22	6	18	56
	Enerio Del Rosario	0	3	4.58	54	0	0	53.0	59	30	27	3	31	31
	Fernando Rodriguez	2	3	3.96	47	0	0	52.1	51	24	23	6	30	57
	Jeff Fulchino	1	4	5.18	36	0	0	33.0	34	19	19	5	18	31
	Nelson Figueroa	0	3	8.69	8	5	0	29.0	45	33	28	3	16	17
	David Carpenter	1	3	2.93	34	0	1	27.2	28	9	9	3	13	29
	Sergio Escalona	2	1	2.93	49	0	0	27.2	24	10	9	3	11	25
	Fernando Abad	1	4	7.32	29	0	0	19.2	28	18	16	5	9	15
	José Valdez	0	0	9.00	12	0	0	14.0	17	14	14	2	7	15
	Brandon Lyon	3	3	11.48	15	0	4	13.1	27	17	17	4	5	6
	Lucas Harrell	0	2	3.46	6	2	0	13.0	12	8	5	0	7	10
	Wesley Wright	0	0	1.50	21	0	0	12.0	6	2	2	1	5	111
	Juan Abreu	0	0	2.70	7	0	0	6.2	6	2	2	1	3	12
	Lance Pendleton	0	0	17.36	4	0	0	4.2	10	9	9	4	1	5
	Xavier Cedeño	0	0	27.00	3	0	0	1.2	7	5	5	2	0	0
Team totals		56	106	4.51	162	162	25	1435.0	1477	796	719	188	560	1191
Other: Complete games—Myers (2) • Sources:

== Major League Baseball draft ==
Houston Astros 2011 MLB draft selections
Rd.	Slot	Draftee	Position	School	Origin	Signed	Notes	Bio
1	11	George Springer	Outfielder	Connecticut • 2011	(Connecticut)	Y	(Note: MLB debut on April 16, 2014, with Houston)	
2	69	Adrian Houser	Right-handed pitcher	Locust Grove HS	(Oklahoma)	Y	(Note: MLB debut on September 26, 2015, with Houston)	
3	99	Jack Armstrong	Right-handed pitcher	Vanderbilt • 2011	(Florida)	Y		
4	130	Chris Lee	Left-handed pitcher	Santa Fe	(Georgia (U.S. state))	Y		
5	160	Nick Tropeano	Right-handed pitcher	Stony Brook	(New York (state))	Y	(Note: MLB debut on September 10, 2014, with Houston)	

== Awards and achievements ==
=== Grand slams ===
No.	Date	Astros batter	Venue	Inning	Pitcher	Opposing team	Box
1	July 25	Carlos Lee	Busch Stadium	8	P. J. Walters	St. Louis Cardinals	
2	August 16	Brian Bogusevic (Note: 1st MLB grand slam) (Note: Pinch hitter)	Minute Maid Park	9 (Note: Ultimate grand slam)	Carlos Marmol	Chicago Cubs	

=== Awards ===
2011 Houston Astros award winners
Name of award		Recipient	Ref.
Darryl Kile Good Guy Award		Jason Bourgeois	
Frank Slocum Big B. A. T. Award		Bob Watson (Note: Former Houston Astros player and general manager.)	
Fred Hartman Award for Long and Meritorious Service to Baseball		Bill Brown	
Houston-Area Major League Player of the Year	STL	Lance Berkman	
Houston Astros	Most Valuable Player (MVP)	Carlos Lee	
Houston Astros	Pitcher of the Year	Wandy Rodríguez	
Houston Astros	Rookie of the Year	J. D. Martinez	
MLB All-Star Game	Reserve outfielder	Hunter Pence	

Other awards results

Name of award	Voting recipient(s) (Team)	Ref.
NL Most Valuable Player	1st—Braun (MIL) • 16th—Pence (HOU/PHI)	
Roberto Clemente	Winner—Ortiz (BOS) • Nominee—Bourgeois (HOU)	

=== Milestones ===
==== Major League debuts ====
Player—Appeared at position

- Jose Altuve, second baseman
- J. D. Martinez, pinch hitter
Date and opponent

- July 20 vs Washington
- July 30 vs Milwaukee
Box

Also:

== Minor league system ==
Level	Team	League	Manager
AAA	Oklahoma City RedHawks	Pacific Coast League	Tony DeFrancesco
AA	Corpus Christi Hooks	Texas League	Tom Lawless
A	Lancaster JetHawks	California League	Tom Spencer
A	Lexington Legends	South Atlantic League	Rodney Linares
A-Short Season	Tri-City ValleyCats	New York–Penn League	Stubby Clapp
Rookie	Greeneville Astros	Appalachian League	Omar López
Rookie	GCL Astros	Gulf Coast League	Ed Romero

Awards

- All-Star Futures Game—Second baseman: Jose Altuve
- Baseball America First Team Minor League All-Star—Second baseman: Jose Altuve
- Houston Astros Minor League Player of the Year: Jose Altuve
- Texas League All-Star:
  - Outfielder: J. D. Martinez
  - Pitcher: Dallas Keuchel
