= Brian Bogusevic =

American baseball player (born 1984)

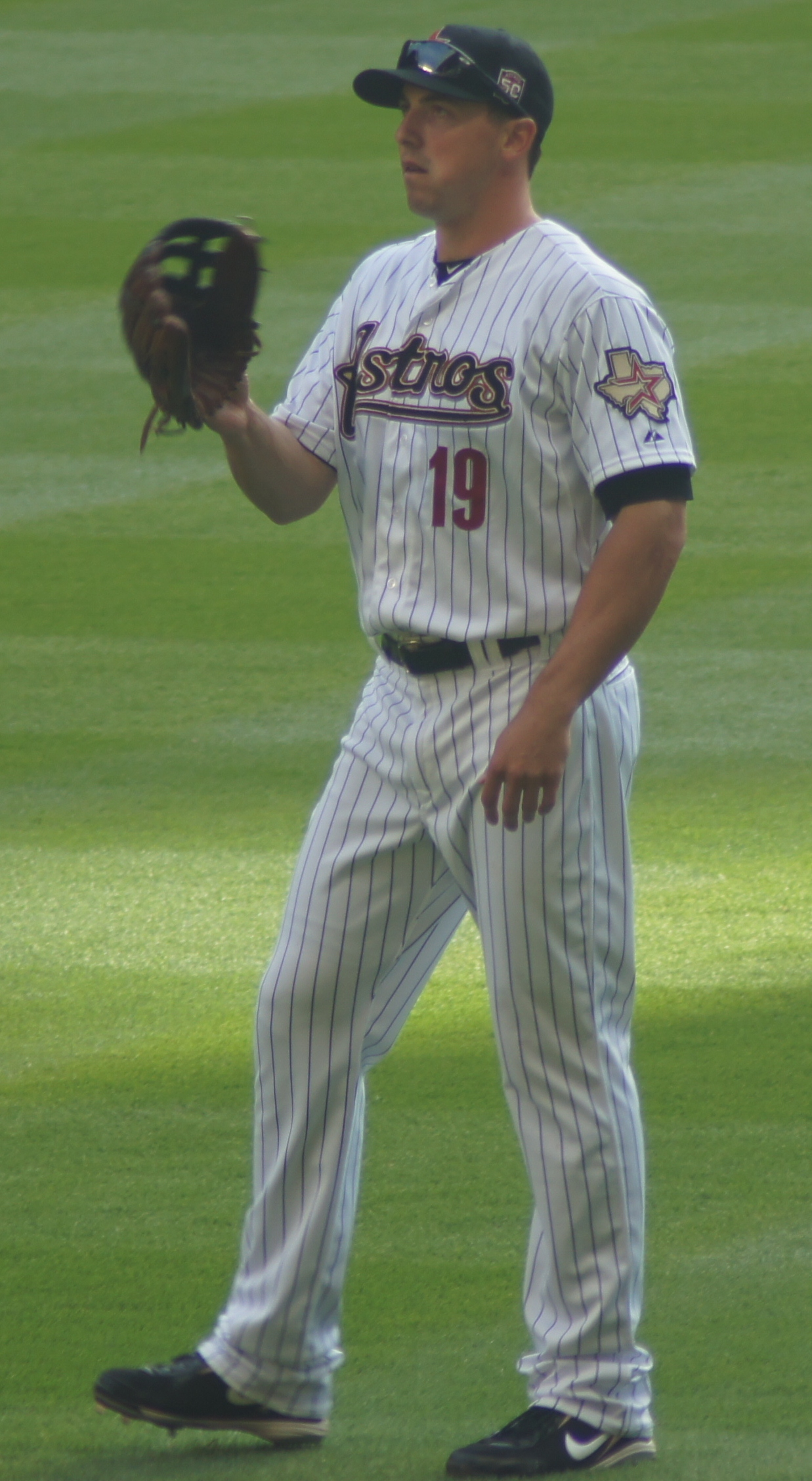
- Bogusevic with the Houston Astros
- Outfielder
- Born: February 18, 1984 (age 42); Oak Lawn, Illinois, U.S.
- Batted: Left Threw: Left

Professional debut
- MLB: September 1, 2010, for the Houston Astros
- NPB: March 25, 2016, for the Orix Buffaloes

Last appearance
- MLB: October 3, 2015, for the Philadelphia Phillies
- NPB: September 1, 2016, for the Orix Buffaloes

MLB statistics
- Batting average: .238
- Home runs: 19
- Runs batted in: 67

NPB statistics
- Batting average: .187
- Home runs: 3
- Runs batted in: 18
- Stats at Baseball Reference

Teams
- Houston Astros (2010–2012); Chicago Cubs (2013); Philadelphia Phillies (2015); Orix Buffaloes (2016)

Career highlights and awards
- Hit an ultimate grand slam on August 16, 2011
Medals
Men's baseball
Representing United States
Pan American Games
| Silver medal – second place | 2015 Toronto | Team |

Brian Thomas Bogusevic (born February 18, 1984) is an American professional baseball former outfielder and broadcaster. He played in Major League Baseball (MLB) for the Houston Astros, Chicago Cubs, and Philadelphia Phillies and in Nippon Professional Baseball (NPB) for the Orix Buffaloes.

== College career ==
Bogusevic was a two-way star player for Tulane University, playing in the outfield and also used as a starting pitcher. He was also a two-way player in high school, a three-year letterman at Chicago's De La Salle Institute for coach Brad Esposito pitching and playing outfield. In 2004, he played collegiate summer baseball with the Falmouth Commodores of the Cape Cod Baseball League. While playing for the Green Wave, he was named to the All-Tournament Team in the 2005 Conference USA Tournament.

== Professional career ==
=== Houston Astros ===
Bogusevic was drafted 24th overall in the 2005 Major League Baseball draft by the Houston Astros as a starting pitcher. He remained a pitcher in the Astros organization until mid-2008 before converting to an outfielder. In 2008, he was selected to play in the Arizona Fall League as an outfielder.

On August 16, 2011, Bogusevic became the 26th player in MLB History to hit an "ultimate grand slam," a pinch-hit walk-off home run which won the game by one run. Also in 2011, he became the fifth player in franchise history to record two outfield assists in the same inning in a contest versus the Pittsburgh Pirates.

Reprising his former role as a pitcher, on June 7, 2012, Bogusevic made one relief appearance against the St. Louis Cardinals. Entering the ninth inning of a 12–2 blowout, he surrendered two runs, featuring a fastball that reached 90 mph.

On November 3, 2012, Bogusevic elected to become a free agent after being outrighted off the 40-man roster.

=== Chicago Cubs ===
On November 21, 2012, Bogusevic signed a minor league deal with the Chicago Cubs. He was allocated to the minors on March 22, 2013, in spite of hitting .410 in spring training. The fifth outfielder was Dave Sappelt, who won the job because of his platooning ability. He was the Iowa Cubs Opening Day first baseman and went 3–5 with an RBI and a run in his debut. Through April, he was hitting .420 with 10 RBI and 16 runs. Through May he was hitting .367 with 5 HR, 20 RBI and 32 runs. On June 25, Bogusevic was called up by Chicago. At the time, Bogusevic was hitting .319 with 10 HR, 32 RBI and 50 runs in 78 games with Iowa. He made his Chicago debut on June 26, going 2–4 with a walk. When Ryan Sweeney went on the disabled list with fracture ribs, Bogusevic took over in center field. However, on July 14, Bogusevic suffered an injury of his own, and was replaced by Junior Lake. After rehabbing in Arizona, Bogusevic returned on August 19, replacing the recently traded David DeJesus. Bogusevic was splitting time with Darnell McDonald in left field with Lake in center field, but when Sweeney returned on September 1, he pushed Lake to left field, and Lake and Bogusevic split time there. In 47 games with Chicago, Bogusevic hit .273 with 6 HR, 16 RBI and 18 runs.

=== Miami Marlins ===
On December 12, 2013, the Cubs traded Bogusevic to the Miami Marlins in exchange for outfielder Justin Ruggiano. Bogusevic was designated for assignment on March 30, 2014. He played in 82 games for the rookie–level Gulf Coast League Marlins and Triple–A New Orleans Zephyrs, slashing .263/.352/.420 with seven home runs, 36 RBI, and six stolen bases. Bogusevic elected free agency on October 6.

=== Philadelphia Phillies ===
On November 1, 2014, Bogusevic signed a minor-league contract with the Philadelphia Phillies. He split between the 2015 season between the Triple–A Lehigh Valley IronPigs and the Phillies. Bogusevic hit .296 with 12 home runs and 57 RBI for Lehigh Valley in 118 games, and .259 with two home runs and five RBI for Philadelphia in 22 games. After being outrighted off the Phillies' 40-man roster, he became a free agent in October 2015.

=== Orix Buffaloes ===
Bogusevic signed with the Orix Buffaloes of Nippon Professional Baseball for the 2016 season. He appeared in 60 games for the Buffaloes in 2016, and hit .187 with three home runs and 18 RBI.

=== Boston Red Sox ===
On January 7, 2017, Bogusevic returned to the MLB by signing a minor league contract with the Boston Red Sox that included an invitation to spring training. Bogusevic hit .278/.331/.467 with 12 home runs and 40 RBI for the Pawtucket Red Sox, the Red Sox Triple–A affiliate. Bogusevic did not appear in a big league game in 2017. He elected free agency following the season on November 6.

== Post-playing career ==
On April 14, 2019, Bogusevic was a substitute postgame anchor for the Houston Astros.

== See also ==
- List of Major League Baseball ultimate grand slams
