= Enerio del Rosario =

Dominican baseball player (born 1985)

Enerio Del Rosario
- Relief pitcher
- Born: October 16, 1985 (age 40); Santa Lucía, Dominican Republic
- Batted: Right Threw: Right

MLB debut
- May 24, 2010, for the Cincinnati Reds

Last MLB appearance
- September 29, 2012, for the Houston Astros

MLB statistics
- Win–loss record: 1–4
- Earned run average: 5.60
- Strikeouts: 46
- Stats at Baseball Reference

Teams
- Cincinnati Reds (2010); Houston Astros (2010–2012)

Enerio Del Rosario (born October 16, 1985) is a Dominican former right-handed pitcher. He was signed in 2005 at the age of 19.

== Career ==
He was added to the Cincinnati Reds 40 man roster after the 2009 season to protect him from the Rule 5 draft. Despite owning a 2.09 ERA in 9 games, Del Rosario allowed 13 hits in just 8 innings of work while also walking 4 batters. He was designated for assignment on September 13, 2010.

On September 16, 2010, Del Rosario was traded to the Houston Astros for cash considerations and added to the 40-man roster.

In 2011, Del Rosario appeared in a career high 54 games for the Astros. His control was an issue, as he issued the same number of walks as strikeouts in 53 innings.

Del Rosario was outrighted to the Astros' Triple-A affiliate Oklahoma City RedHawks on July 28, 2012. He was called up to the Major League roster on September 10 when Francisco Cordero was released. Del Rosario was designated for assignment by the Astros on October 26, 2012, when Che-Hsuan Lin was claimed off waivers from the Boston Red Sox. In 2013, he pitched in the Mexican League for the Acereros de Monclova.
