= Jeff Keppinger =

American baseball infielder (born 1980)

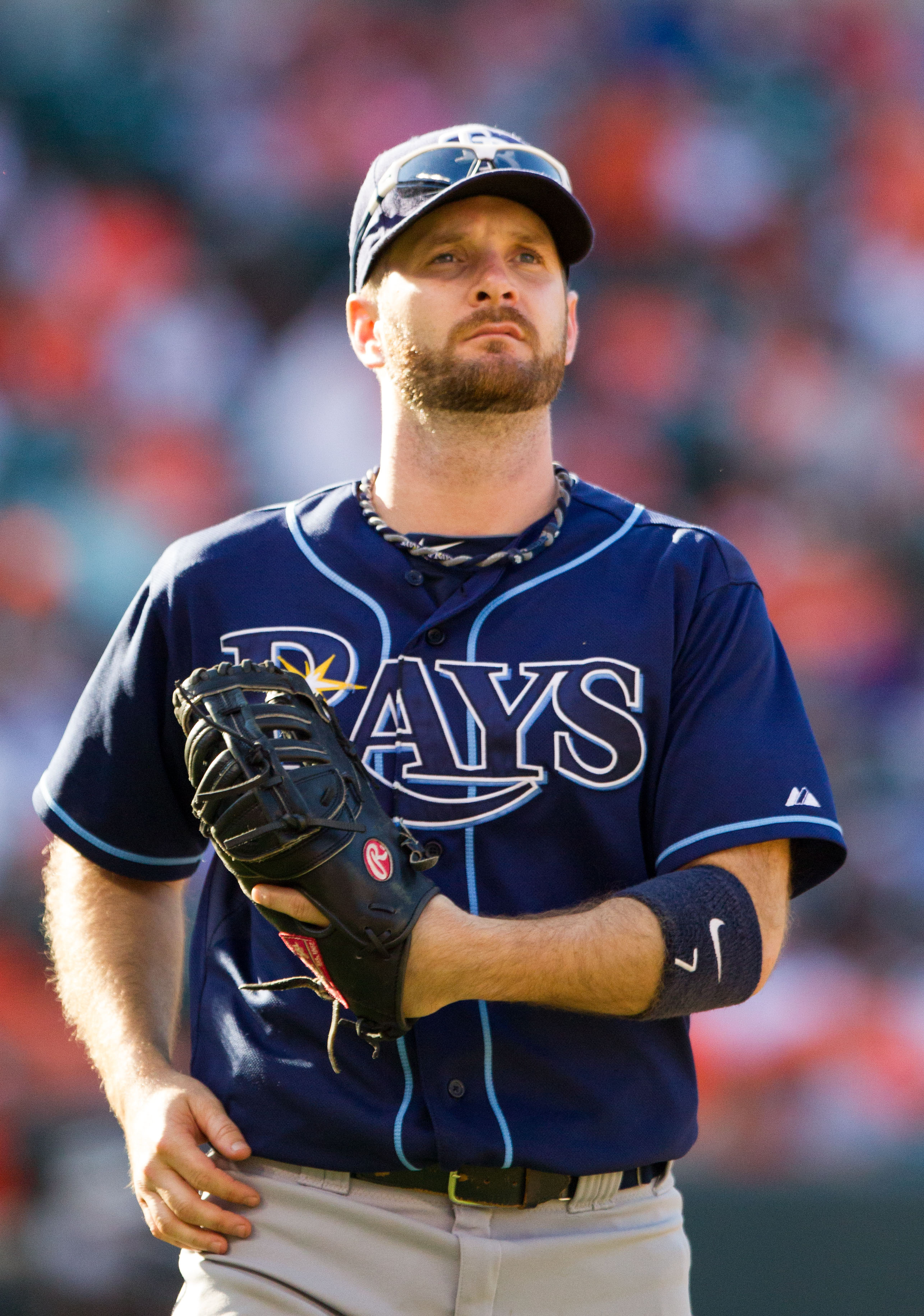
- Keppinger with the Tampa Bay Rays
- Infielder
- Born: April 21, 1980 (age 46); Miami, Florida, U.S.
- Batted: Right Threw: Right

MLB debut
- August 20, 2004, for the New York Mets

Last MLB appearance
- September 23, 2013, for the Chicago White Sox

MLB statistics
- Batting average: .282
- Home runs: 45
- Runs batted in: 295
- Stats at Baseball Reference

Teams
- New York Mets (2004); Kansas City Royals (2006); Cincinnati Reds (2007–2008); Houston Astros (2009–2011); San Francisco Giants (2011); Tampa Bay Rays (2012); Chicago White Sox (2013)

Jeffrey Scott Keppinger (born April 21, 1980) is an American former professional baseball infielder. He played in Major League Baseball (MLB) from 2004 to 2013 for the New York Mets, Kansas City Royals, Cincinnati Reds, Houston Astros, San Francisco Giants, Tampa Bay Rays, and Chicago White Sox.

Known as a contact hitter, Keppinger consistently had one of the lowest strikeout rates in the major leagues. He led the league in at-bats-to-strikeouts ratio in 2008 (19.1) and 2010 (14.3), and posted a career mark of 13.47 (214 strikeouts in 2,882 at-bats).

== Amateur career ==
In 1994 Keppinger played on the Dunwoody Braves summer baseball team, and was named to the AAU All-American team. He also played for the New England Collegiate Baseball League's Keene Swamp Bats.

He compiled a .380 batting average at the University of Georgia where, in the 2001 College World Series, he hit a two-run home run off star pitcher Mark Prior. In 2000 and 2001, he played collegiate summer baseball for the Orleans Cardinals of the Cape Cod Baseball League. He was selected by the Pittsburgh Pirates in the 4th round of the 2001 Major League Baseball draft.

== Professional career ==
=== New York Mets ===
At the 2004 trading deadline, while Keppinger was in double-A ball, he was traded to the Mets as part of the Kris Benson for Ty Wigginton trade. His average soared even higher with the double-A Binghamton Mets and stayed above .300 with the triple-A Norfolk Tides earning him a call to the majors on August 20. He responded by hitting .284 with three home runs and nine RBI in 33 games played.

In 2005, Keppinger again excelled in Norfolk while hitting .337. He was poised to return to the majors in June when Kazuo Matsui was injured, but bad luck struck when Keppinger fractured his kneecap around the same time as Matsui. The injury not only prevented his return to the majors but ended his entire 2005 season.

=== Kansas City Royals ===
On July 19, 2006, Keppinger was acquired by the Kansas City Royals for middle infielder Ruben Gotay and Keppinger was sent to Triple-A Omaha.

Keppinger was called up by the Royals in August 2006. With a season-ending injury to starting third baseman Mark Teahen, Keppinger was expected to see some major league action. A key moment in his career occurred on September 9, 2006, at Boston's Fenway Park, when, after entering the game against the Red Sox as a pinch runner, he came to bat in the top of 12th inning in a 4–4 tie game with two runners on. Keppinger, batting against Manny Delcarmen, hit a ball just to the left of the right field foul pole for a three-run home run, breaking the 4–4 tie. The Royals went on to beat the Red Sox in that game 10–4.

=== Cincinnati Reds ===
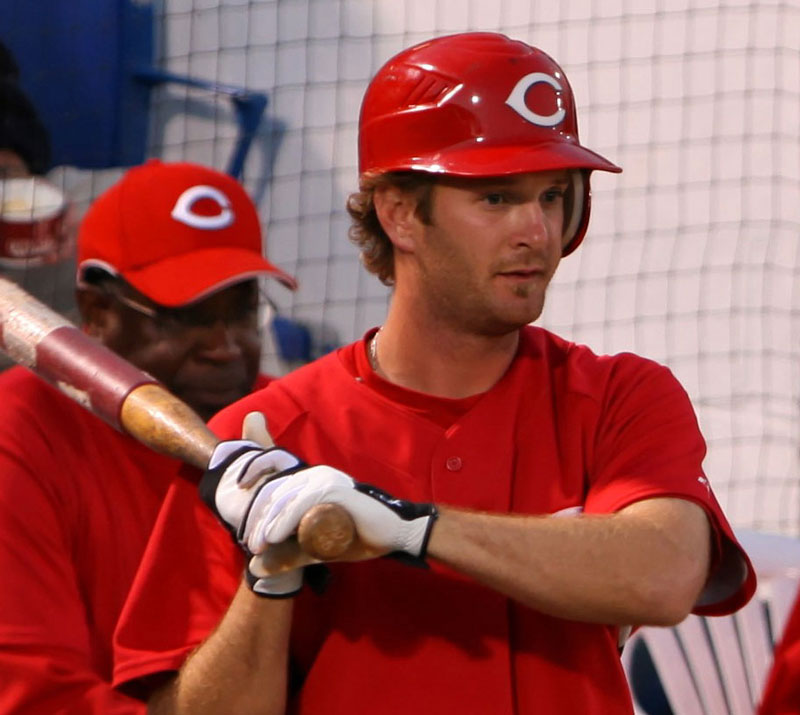
Keppinger during his tenure with the Cincinnati Reds in 2008 spring training

On January 2, 2007, Keppinger was designated for assignment by the Royals. Eight days later, Keppinger was traded to the Cincinnati Reds. In return, the Royals received Minor League pitcher Russ Haltiwanger.

On May 13, 2008, Keppinger fractured his patella in the second inning of a game against the Florida Marlins, placing him on the 15-day disabled list. On June 22, 2008, he returned, much to the joy of the Reds who had just recently lost another shortstop to injury in Jolbert Cabrera. In 2008, he had the lowest strikeout percentage in the majors, at 4.8%, striking out once only every 19.1 at-bats.

=== Houston Astros ===
On March 31, 2009, Keppinger was traded to the Houston Astros for minor league infielder Drew Sutton. Keppinger saw a majority of his playing time at third base, filling in for Geoff Blum while he was injured. Still versatile, Keppinger also played shortstop, second base, and first base during the '08 and '09 seasons. Keppinger began the 2010 season with the Astros as the primary backup at second base to starter Kazuo Matsui. However, after Matsui's offense proved inept after 71 at-bats, Keppinger was named the starter after Matsui was released by the Astros on May 19, 2010. However, Keppinger would not be part of the team's plan at second base for long, as the Astros elected to trade Keppinger on the same day that they promoted minor league second baseman Jose Altuve on July 19, 2011.

=== San Francisco Giants ===
On July 19, 2011, Keppinger was traded to the San Francisco Giants in exchange for pitchers Henry Sosa and Jason Stoffel. He hit a walk-off single against his former team, the Houston Astros, on August 27 and 28. In 43 appearances for San Francisco, Keppinger batted .307/.320/.436 with four home runs and 20 RBI. On December 13, Keppinger was non-tendered by the Giants and became a free agent.

=== Tampa Bay Rays ===
On January 26, 2012, Keppinger was signed to a one-year deal with the Tampa Bay Rays. The deal became official the next day. Keppinger had a good season as a utility infielder, playing first, second and third base throughout the season. Over 115 games, Keppinger batted .325 in 385 at-bats. He also hit 9 home runs and 40 RBI with an OPS of .806. On May 19, Keppinger broke his big right toe while sitting in the dugout. A foul ball from Martin Prado struck Keppinger on the foot and he subsequently missed over a month. Keppinger became a free-agent at the end of the season.

=== Chicago White Sox ===
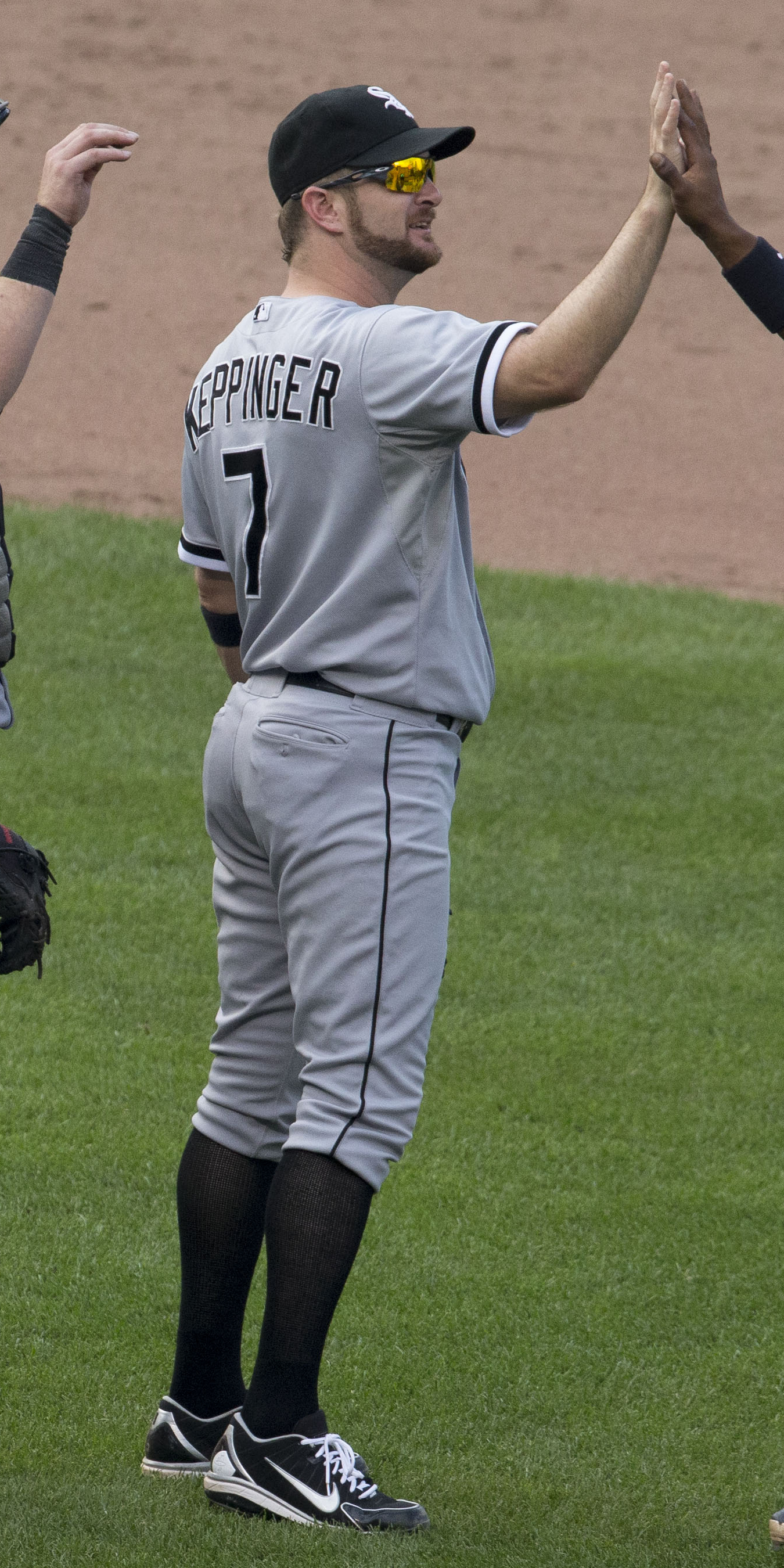
Keppinger with the Chicago White Sox

On December 10, 2012, Keppinger signed a three-year, $12 million contract with the Chicago White Sox. He made 117 appearances for the White Sox during the 2013 season, batting .253/.283/.317 with four home runs and 40 RBI. On September 24, 2013, Keppinger underwent season-ending surgery on his right shoulder.

Keppinger began the 2014 campaign on the disabled list due to "tightness in his surgically repaired shoulder." He was designated for assignment by Chicago on May 14, 2014. On May 21, the White Sox officially released Keppinger.

== Personal life ==
Keppinger's older brother Billy, a left-handed pitcher, played independent baseball and minor league baseball in the Kansas City Royals system.

Keppinger resides in Dacula, Georgia. He married his second wife Dihanna on October 7, 2017, at The Ritz Carlton in Lake Oconee, Georgia.
