= Aneury Rodríguez =

Dominican baseball player (born 1987)

- Pitcher
- Born: December 13, 1987 (age 38); Higüey, Dominican Republic
- Batted: Right Threw: Right

Professional debut
- MLB: April 2, 2011, for the Houston Astros
- KBO: April 17, 2013, for the Samsung Lions

Last appearance
- MLB: May 8, 2012, for the Houston Astros
- KBO: June 29, 2013, for the Samsung Lions

MLB statistics
- Win–loss record: 1–6
- Earned run average: 5.12
- Strikeouts: 70

KBO statistics
- Win–loss record: 3-5
- Earned run average: 4.40
- Strikeouts: 46
- Stats at Baseball Reference

Teams
- Houston Astros (2011–2012); Samsung Lions (2013)

Aneury Rodríguez (born December 13, 1987) is a Dominican former professional baseball pitcher. He has played in Major League Baseball (MLB) for the Houston Astros and in Korea Baseball Organization (KBO) for the Samsung Lions.

== Career ==
Rodríguez signed with the American team Colorado Rockies as an international free agent in 2005. He was traded to the Tampa Bay Rays for Jason Hammel in 2009.

Following the 2010 season, Rodríguez was selected in the Rule 5 draft by the Houston Astros. He pitched for the Astros in 2011 and 2012. After the 2012 season, Rodríguez signed with the Samsung Lions of the Korea Baseball Organization. He pitched in 11 games for Samsung in 2013 before being released.

== See also ==
- Rule 5 draft results
