= José Valdez (baseball, born 1983) =

Dominican baseball player (born 1983)

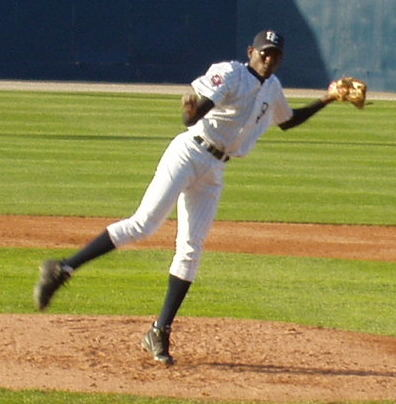
- Valdez with the Battle Creek Yankees in 2003
- Pitcher
- Born: January 22, 1983 (age 43); Santo Domingo, Dominican Republic
- Batted: Right Threw: Right

MLB debut
- April 17, 2011, for the Houston Astros

Last MLB appearance
- October 3, 2012, for the Houston Astros

MLB statistics
- Win–loss record: 0–0
- Earned run average: 5.88
- Strikeouts: 25
- Stats at Baseball Reference

Teams
- Houston Astros (2011–2012)

Jose Guerrero Valdez (born January 22, 1983) is a Dominican professional baseball pitcher. He played in Major League Baseball (MLB) for the Houston Astros in 2011 and 2012.

== Career ==
=== New York Yankees ===
Valdez was signed by the New York Yankees as an international free agent in 2000.

=== Houston Astros ===
On November 20, 2009, Valdez signed a major league contract with the Houston Astros. On October 18, 2011, he declared for free agency. However, he signed a minor league contract with the team on October 24.

On September 1, 2012, the Astros selected Valdez's contract, adding him to their active roster. In 12 appearances for Houston, he compiled a 2.25 ERA with 10 strikeouts across 12 innings pitched. On November 1, Valdez was removed from the 40-man roster and sent outright to the Triple-A Oklahoma City RedHawks.

=== Later career ===
Valdez signed a minor league deal with the Boston Red Sox in January 2014, playing in their farm system that season. After spending 2015 in the Mexican League, he did not play professionally in 2016. Having signed with them in 2017, he currently plays for the Toros del Este of the Dominican Winter League.
