= Henry Sosa =

Dominican baseball player (born 1985)

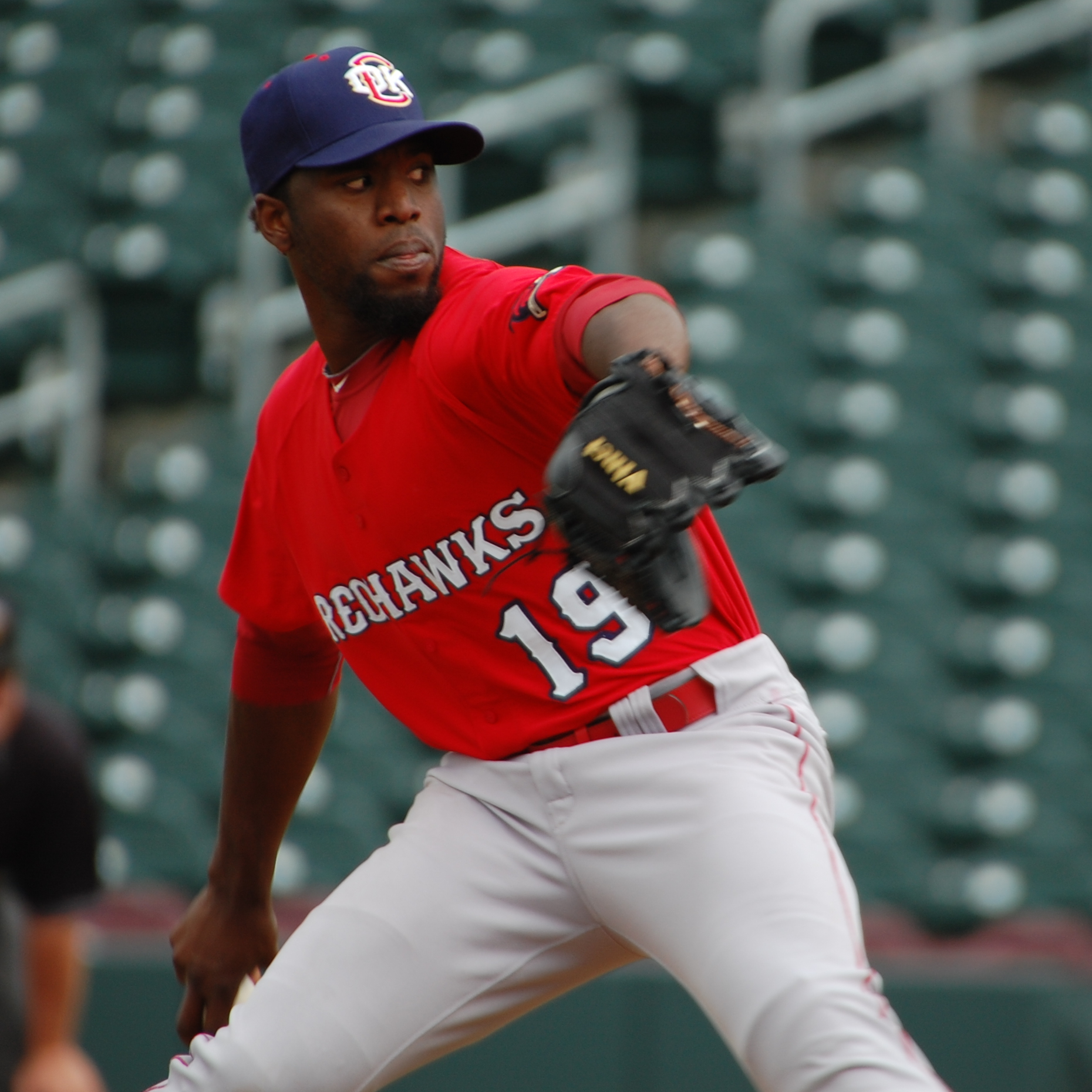
- Sosa pitching for the Oklahoma City RedHawks, triple-A affiliates of the Houston Astros, in 2012

Tigres de Quintana Roo – No. 40
- Pitcher
- Born: July 28, 1985 (age 41); El Seibo Province, Dominican Republic
- Bats: Right Throws: Right

Professional debut
- MLB: August 10, 2011, for the Houston Astros
- KBO: 2012, for the Kia Tigers
- CPBL: March 24, 2019, for the Fubon Guardians

MLB statistics (through 2011 Season)
- Win–loss record: 3–5
- Earned run average: 5.23
- Strikeouts: 38

KBO statistics (through 2019 season)
- Win–loss record: 77–63
- Earned run average: 4.28
- Strikeouts: 1,059

CPBL statistics (through 2022 season)
- Win–loss record: 26–10
- Earned run average: 2.78
- Strikeouts: 278
- Stats at Baseball Reference

Teams
- Houston Astros (2011); Kia Tigers (2012–2013); Nexen Heroes (2014); LG Twins (2015–2018); Fubon Guardians (2019); SK Wyverns (2019); Fubon Guardians (2020–2021); Rakuten Monkeys (2022)

Henry Sosa Esther (born July 28, 1985) is a Dominican professional baseball pitcher for the Tigres de Quintana Roo of the Mexican League. He has previously played in Major League Baseball (MLB) for the Houston Astros, in the KBO League (KBO) for the Kia Tigers, Nexen Heroes, LG Twins, and SK Wyverns, and in the Chinese Professional Baseball League (CPBL) for the Fubon Guardians and Rakuten Monkeys.

== Career ==
=== San Francisco Giants ===
Sosa was signed as an amateur free agent by the San Francisco Giants on April 23, 2004. He began his professional career in 2006 with the rookie-level Arizona League Giants. With them, he went 2–1 with a 3.90 ERA in nine games (six starts). He also struck out 41 batters in 32 1/3 innings. In 2007, he played for the San Jose Giants and Augusta Greenjackets. He went 6–0 with a 0.73 ERA in 13 games (10 starts) with the Greenjackets and 5–5 with a 4.38 ERA in 14 starts with the Giants. He went a combined 11–5 with a 2.58 ERA in 27 games (24 starts). In 125 2/3 innings, he struck out 139 batters. He also played for the Estrellas de Oriente of the Dominican Winter League that year. For the San Jose Giants and Augusta Greenjackets in 2008, he went a combined 3–4 with a 4.21 ERA in 57 2/3 innings. He played only two games with Augusta.

=== Houston Astros ===
On July 19, 2011, Sosa was traded to the Houston Astros along with Jason Stoffel for infielder Jeff Keppinger. He made his Major League debut on August 10, 2011, against the Arizona Diamondbacks. He started the game and allowed four runs in six innings to pick up the loss. His first win was recorded when he allowed one run in six innings against the San Francisco Giants on August 25. In 10 starts he was 3–5 with a 5.23 ERA.

=== Kia Tigers ===
He pitched with the Kia Tigers in the KBO League in 2012–2013.

=== Los Angeles Dodgers ===
Sosa signed a minor league contract with the Los Angeles Dodgers in December, 2013 and was assigned to the Triple–A Albuquerque Isotopes. In seven starts for the Isotopes he was 1–2 with a 3.72 ERA and 27 strikeouts.

=== Nexen Heroes ===
On May 15, 2014, Sosa signed with the Nexen Heroes of the KBO League.

=== LG Twins ===
Sosa signed with the LG Twins of the KBO League for the 2015 season. He re-signed with LG Twins for the 2016, 2017 and 2018 seasons. Since then, he has become one of the most well-known veteran foreign pitchers in the KBO League alongside Dustin Nippert. He became a free agent following the 2018 season.

=== Fubon Guardians ===
Sosa signed with the Fubon Guardians of the Chinese Professional Baseball League for the 2019 season.

=== SK Wyverns ===
On June 3, 2019, Sosa signed with the SK Wyverns of the KBO League for the remainder of the 2019 season. He became a free agent after the season.

=== Fubon Guardians (second stint) ===
On December 13, 2019, Sosa signed with the Fubon Guardians for the 2020 season. In 12 games with Fubon, Sosa recorded an 8–2 record and 1.56 ERA with 85 strikeouts in 86.2 innings of work. Sosa was the Opening Day starting pitcher for the Guardians on March 14, 2021, against the CTBC Brothers. In a March 21 game against the Rakuten Monkeys, Sosa collapsed to the ground after an apparent knee injury following the delivery of a pitch. On April 19, Sosa underwent ACL surgery. On July 12, Sosa was released by Fubon.

=== Rakuten Monkeys ===
On January 8, 2022, Sosa signed with the Rakuten Monkeys of the Chinese Professional Baseball League. In 5 starts for the team, he logged a 2–3 record and 2.73 ERA with 11 strikeouts over 33 innings. On July 7, Sosa was released in order to pursue opportunities in the Mexican League.

=== Diablos Rojos del México ===
On July 13, 2022, Sosa signed with the Diablos Rojos del México of the Mexican League. In 5 games (4 starts) for México, he posted a 1–1 record and 6.75 ERA with 15 strikeouts across 20 innings pitched. Sosa was released by the team on January 19, 2023.

=== Piratas de Campeche ===
On June 27, 2023, Sosa signed with the Piratas de Campeche of the Mexican League. In 7 starts for Campeche, he posted a 3.94 ERA with 25 strikeouts in 32 innings of work.

=== Spire City Ghost Hounds ===
On August 12, 2023, Sosa signed with the Spire City Ghost Hounds of the Atlantic League of Professional Baseball. In 5 starts for Spire City, he recorded a 5.53 ERA with 26 strikeouts in 27 2/3 innings of work. On September 9, Sosa was released by the Ghost Hounds.

=== Conspiradores de Querétaro ===
On February 5, 2024, Sosa signed with the Conspiradores de Querétaro of the Mexican League. In 20 games (12 starts) for Querétaro, he registered a 6–4 record and 6.63 ERA with 64 strikeouts across 73 1/3 innings pitched. Sosa became a free agent following the season.

=== Marineros de Carabobo ===
In 2025, Sosa signed with the Marineros de Carabobo of the Venezuelan Major League.

=== Tigres de Quintana Roo ===
On June 27, 2026, Sosa signed with the Tigres de Quintana Roo of the Mexican League.
