= Santa Fe Saints =

- University: Santa Fe College
- Conference: Mid-Florida; Panhandle; Central
- NJCAA: Division I
- Location: Gainesville, Florida
- Varsity teams: 5
- Baseball stadium: Santa Fe College Baseball Field
- Mascot: Caesar
- Nickname: Saints
- Website: www.santafesaints.com

The Santa Fe Saints are the intercollegiate athletic teams that represent Santa Fe College, located in Gainesville. The Saints compete in the Mid-Florida Conference within Region 8 of the National Junior College Athletic Association (NJCAA). Caesar, an anthropomorphic St. Bernard, serves as the mascot for the Saints.

== Sports ==
=== Baseball ===
Santa Fe is represented by a men's baseball team. In November 2022, the college announced a fundraising initiative for new baseball and softball facilities. In 2016, the Saints secured their sixth Mid-Conference title in a ten-year span.

Johnny Wiggs is the current head coach of the team. Under Wiggs, the team has won nine Mid-Florida Conference Championships and two FCSAA/NJCAA Region 8 State Championships. The team also played in the 2009 JUCO World Series final, finishing as the runners-up. Wiggs earned his 500th win with Santa Fe in 2022. The team achieved its best start in program history in 2023, starting 14–0. That year marked Wiggs' 17th season as the head coach of the team.

Mallex Smith and Keon Broxton are Sante Fe alumni who have played in Major League Baseball (MLB).

=== Basketball ===
Both men's and women's basketball is played at Santa Fe. In 2022, the men's team won its eight conference title. Women's basketball coach Chanda Stebbins notched her 300th career win as a coach in 2023.

=== Softball ===
Santa Fe's women's softball team won the 2008 FSCAA Division I championship, en route to being the runners-up in the NJCAA national tournament.

=== Volleyball ===
Santa Fe has a women's volleyball team. Under head coach Nick Cheronis, the Saints made a NJCAA Region 8/FCSAA State Tournament appearance in all seven of Cheronis' seasons with the team through 2021.

== Championships and national tournament appearances ==
In their history of intercollegiate competition, Santa Fe's athletic teams have won six NJCAA Region 8 state championships. They have also notched eight national tournament appearances. The women's softball and men's baseball teams were national tournament runner-ups in their sport in 2008 and 2009, respectively.

=== National tournament appearances ===
Men's teams

- Baseball (JUCO World Series) (3): 1985 • 2009 • 2016

Women's teams

- Basketball (2): 1982 • 1984
- Softball (2): 2008 • 2013
- Volleyball (1): 2016

=== NJCAA Region 8 championships ===
Men's teams

- Baseball (3): 1985 • 2009 • 2016

Women's teams

- Softball (1): 2008
- Basketball (2): 1982 • 1984

=== Conference championships ===
Men's teams

- Baseball (11): 1992 • 1995 • 2007 • 2009 • 2010 • 2011 • 2012 • 2016 • 2017 • 2018 • 2021
- Basketball (8):
  - Mid-Florida Conference (7): 1997 • 1998 • 2003 • 2005 • 2007 • 2008 • 2012
  - Central Conference (1): 2022

Women's teams

- Basketball (11): 1981 • 1982 • 1983 • 1984 • 1985 • 2009 • 2010 • 2011 • 2017 • 2019 • 2020
- Softball (9): 2005 • 2006 • 2007 • 2008 • 2009 • 2010 • 2011 • 2013 • 2014
- Volleyball (4):
  - Mid-Florida Conference (2): 2014 • 2020
  - Panhandle Conference (2): 2018 • 2019
