= 2011 Cincinnati Reds season =

2011 Cincinnati Reds
- League: National League
- Division: Central
- Ballpark: Great American Ball Park
- City: Cincinnati, Ohio
- Record: 79–83 (.488)
- Divisional place: 3rd
- Owners: Bob Castellini
- General managers: Walt Jocketty
- Managers: Dusty Baker
- Television: Fox Sports Ohio (Thom Brennaman, Chris Welsh, Jim Kelch, George Grande, Jeff Brantley, Sean Casey)
- Radio: WLW (700 AM); Cincinnati Reds Radio Network (Marty Brennaman, Jeff Brantley, Jim Kelch)
- Stats: ESPN.com; Baseball Reference

The 2011 Cincinnati Reds season was the 142nd season for the franchise in Major League Baseball, and their ninth at Great American Ball Park in Cincinnati. The team attempted to return to the postseason for the second consecutive year following their National League Central championship in 2010. Dusty Baker returned for his fourth year managing the Reds and his 18th season managed overall.

== Offseason ==
The Reds off-season began with fans calling for a full-time power-hitting left-handed left fielder; a leadoff hitter; and a strong offensive shortstop as many were unhappy with the weak bat of Paul Janish. The Reds exercised the options of Jonny Gomes, while declining the options of Aaron Harang and Orlando Cabrera. They also exercised the option on Bronson Arroyo, but later signed him to a 3-year, $35 Million extension through 2013. They also extended 23-year-old right-fielder Jay Bruce for 6 yrs./ $51M. They resigned catcher Ramón Hernández, who will again team up with Ryan Hanigan in what was the 2nd best offensive catching duo in the NL of 2010, while giving highly touted prospect Devin Mesoraco more time to develop in the minors. They also resigned another veteran in backup corner infielder Miguel Cairo. Jocketty brought in two young outfielders on minor league deals, Brian Barton and Jeremy Hermida. Hermida was invited to spring training. The Reds also signed former phenom pitcher and 2003 Rookie of the Year Dontrelle Willis to a minor league deal, also giving him a spring training invite. Then on January 7, the Reds made their biggest acquisition of the off-season, signing the current World Series MVP, veteran shortstop Édgar Rentería. GM Walt Jocketty has stated that Rentería will be in a backup role to Janish. On January 10, the Reds signed left fielder Fred Lewis for $900 K. He is expected to, at the very least, platoon with Gomes in left field. On January 16, it was announced that the Reds and Joey Votto agreed to a 3-year, $38 million deal.

== Regular season ==
The Reds opened the 2011 season with a walk-off home run against division rival Milwaukee to win on opening day 7–6 which eventually propelled them to a 5–0 start to the season, their best start since 1990 (the year which they last won the World Series). Throughout the months of April and May the Reds were either near the lead or the leader of the NL Central division. May also saw a three-game series sweep of the rival St. Louis Cardinals, the Reds first sweep of the Cardinals since 2007. In June, the Reds continued to stay in the division race finishing the month with a 42–40 record. July started off poorly for the Reds who currently sit in fourth place in the division where they stayed through the week following the All-Star break. They would eventually finish the season in 3rd place with a 79–83 record.

=== Season standings ===
==== National League Central ====
NL Central
Team	W	L	Pct.	GB	Home	Road
Milwaukee Brewers	96	66	.593	—	57‍–‍24	39‍–‍42
St. Louis Cardinals	90	72	.556	6	45‍–‍36	45‍–‍36
Cincinnati Reds	79	83	.488	17	42‍–‍39	37‍–‍44
Pittsburgh Pirates	72	90	.444	24	36‍–‍45	36‍–‍45
Chicago Cubs	71	91	.438	25	39‍–‍42	32‍–‍49
Houston Astros	56	106	.346	40	31‍–‍50	25‍–‍56

==== National League Wild Card ====
Division leaders
Team	W	L	Pct.
Philadelphia Phillies	102	60	.630
Milwaukee Brewers	96	66	.593
Arizona Diamondbacks	94	68	.580

Wild Card team (Top team qualifies for postseason)
Team	W	L	Pct.	GB
St. Louis Cardinals	90	72	.556	—
Atlanta Braves	89	73	.549	1
San Francisco Giants	86	76	.531	4
Los Angeles Dodgers	82	79	.509	7½
Washington Nationals	80	81	.497	9½
Cincinnati Reds	79	83	.488	11
New York Mets	77	85	.475	13
Colorado Rockies	73	89	.451	17
Florida Marlins	72	90	.444	18
Pittsburgh Pirates	72	90	.444	18
Chicago Cubs	71	91	.438	19
San Diego Padres	71	91	.438	19
Houston Astros	56	106	.346	34

=== Record vs. opponents ===
2011 National League record Source: MLB Standings Grid – 2011
Team	AZ	ATL	CHC	CIN	COL	FLA	HOU	LAD	MIL	NYM	PHI	PIT	SD	SF	STL	WSH	AL
Arizona	–	2–3	3–4	4–2	13–5	5–2	6–1	10–8	4–3	3–3	3–3	3–3	11–7	9–9	3–4	5–3	10–8
Atlanta	3–2	–	4–3	3–3	6–2	12–6	5–1	2–5	5–3	9–9	6–12	4–2	4–5	6–1	1–5	9–9	10–5
Chicago	4–3	3–4	–	7–11	2–4	3–3	8–7	3–3	6–10	4–2	2–5	8–8	3–3	5–4	5–10	3–4	5–10
Cincinnati	2–4	3–3	11–7	–	3–4	3–3	9–6	4–2	8–8	2–5	1–7	5–10	4–2	5–2	9–6	4–2	7–11
Colorado	5–13	2–6	4–2	4–3	–	3–3	5–2	9–9	3–6	5–2	1–4	4–3	9–9	5–13	2–4	4–3	8–7
Florida	2–5	6–12	3–3	3–3	3–3	–	6–1	3–3	0–7	9–9	6–12	6–0	0–7	4–2	2–6	11–7	8–10
Houston	1–6	1–5	7–8	6–9	2–5	1–6	–	4–5	3–12	3–3	2–4	7–11	3–5	4–3	5–10	3–3	4–11
Los Angeles	8–10	5–2	3–3	2–4	9–9	3–3	5–4	–	2–4	2–5	1–5	6–2	13–5	9–9	4–3	4–2	6–9
Milwaukee	3–4	3–5	10–6	8–8	6–3	7–0	12–3	4–2	–	4–2	3–4	12–3	3–2	3–3	9–9	3–3	6–9
New York	3–3	9–9	2–4	5–2	2–5	9–9	3–3	5–2	2–4	–	7–11	4–4	4–3	2–4	3–3	8–10	9–9
Philadelphia	3–3	12–6	5–2	7–1	4–1	12–6	4–2	5–1	4–3	11–7	–	4–2	7–1	4–3	3–6	8–10	9–6
Pittsburgh	3–3	2–4	8–8	10–5	3–4	0–6	11–7	2–6	3–12	4–4	2–4	–	2–4	3–3	7–9	4–4	8–7
San Diego	7–11	5–4	3–3	2–4	9–9	7–0	5–3	5–13	2–3	3–4	1–7	4–2	–	6–12	3–3	3–4	6–9
San Francisco	9–9	1–6	4–5	2–5	13–5	2–4	3–4	9–9	3–3	4–2	3–4	3–3	12–6	–	5–2	3–4	10–5
St. Louis	4–3	5–1	10–5	6–9	4–2	6–2	10–5	3–4	9–9	3–3	6–3	9–7	3–3	2–5	–	2–4	8–7
Washington	3–5	9–9	4–3	2–4	3–4	7–11	3–3	2–4	3–3	10–8	10–8	4–4	4–3	4–3	4–2	–	8–7

=== Game log ===
2011 game log
March/April (14–13): Home (8–7); Road (6–6)

#	Date	TV	Opponent	Score	Win	Loss	Save	Attendance	Record	Box
1	March 31	Brewers	FSO	W 7–6	Ondrusek (1–0)	Axford (0–1)		42,398	1–0	Brewers 6, Reds 7 Final Score (03/31/2011) on MLB Gameday
2	April 2	Brewers	FSO	W 4–2	Wood (1–0)	Marcum (0–1)	Cordero (1)	37,967	2–0	Brewers 2, Reds 4 Final Score (04/02/2011) on MLB Gameday
3	April 3	Brewers	FSO	W 12–3	Arroyo (1–0)	Wolf (0–1)		24,805	3–0	Brewers 3, Reds 12 Final Score (04/03/2011) on MLB Gameday
4	April 5	Astros	FSO	W 8–2	Leake (1–0)	Happ (0–1)		11,821	4–0	Astros 2, Reds 8 Final Score (04/05/2011) on MLB Gameday
5	April 6	Astros	FSO	W 12–4	Vólquez (1–0)	Figueroa (0–1)		17,719	5–0	Astros 4, Reds 12 Final Score (04/06/2011) on MLB Gameday
6	April 7	Astros	FSO	L 2–3	Abad (1–0)	Masset (0–1)	Lyon (1)	20,014	5–1	Astros 3, Reds 2 Final Score (04/07/2011) on MLB Gameday
7	April 8	@ Diamondbacks	FSO	L 2–13	Kennedy (1–0)	Wood (1–1)		48,030	5–2	Reds 2, D-backs 13 Final Score (04/08/2011) on MLB Gameday
8	April 9	@ Diamondbacks	FSO	W 6–1	Arroyo (2–0)	Hudson (0–2)		20,729	6–2	Reds 6, D-backs 1 Final Score (04/09/2011) on MLB Gameday
9	April 10	@ Diamondbacks	FSO	L 8–10	Heilman (1–0)	Masset (0–2)	Putz (3)	19,728	6–3	Reds 8, D-backs 10 Final Score (04/10/2011) on MLB Gameday
10	April 11	@ Padres	FSO	W 3–2	Vólquez (2–0)	Latos (0–1)	Cordero (2)	18,022	7–3	Reds 3, Padres 2 Final Score (04/11/2011) on MLB Gameday
11	April 12	@ Padres	FSO	W 8–2 (11)	Ondrusek (2–0)	Luebke (0–1)		17,379	8–3	Reds 8, Padres 2 Final Score (04/12/2011) on MLB Gameday
12	April 13	@ Padres	FSO	L 2–3	Bell (1–0)	Masset (0–3)		17,057	8–4	Reds 2, Padres 3 Final Score (04/13/2011) on MLB Gameday
13	April 15	Pirates	FSO	L 1–6	Morton (2–0)	Arroyo (2–1)		21,312	8–5	Pirates 6, Reds 1 Final Score (04/15/2011) on MLB Gameday
14	April 16	Pirates	FSO	W 11–2	Leake (2–0)	McDonald (0–1)		26,418	9–5	Pirates 2, Reds 11 Final Score (04/16/2011) on MLB Gameday
15	April 17	Pirates	FSO	L 6–7	Resop (1–0)	Ondrusek (2–1)	Hanrahan (5)	32,105	9–6	Pirates 7, Reds 6 Final Score (04/17/2011) on MLB Gameday
16	April 18	Pirates	FSO	L 3–9	Correia (3–1)	Wood (1–2)		12,777	9–7	Pirates 9, Reds 3 Final Score (04/18/2011) on MLB Gameday
17	April 19	Diamondbacks	FSO	L 4–5	Galarraga (3–0)	LeCure (0–1)	Putz (4)	12,994	9–8	D-backs 5, Reds 4 Final Score (04/19/2011) on MLB Gameday
18	April 20	Diamondbacks	FSO	L 1–3	Kennedy (2–1)	Arroyo (2–2)	Putz (5)	14,915	9–9	D-backs 3, Reds 1 Final Score (04/20/2011) on MLB Gameday
19	April 21	Diamondbacks	MLBN	W 7–4	Leake (3–0)	Hudson (0–4)		17,319	10–9	D-backs 4, Reds 7 Final Score (04/21/2011) on MLB Gameday
20	April 22	@ Cardinals	FSO	L 2–4	McClellan (3–0)	Maloney (0–1)	Boggs (2)	40,327	10–10	Reds 2, Cardinals 4 Final Score (04/22/2011) on MLB Gameday
21	April 23	@ Cardinals	Fox	W 5–3	Chapman (1–0)	Batista (1–1)	Cordero (3)	41,877	11–10	Reds 5, Cardinals 3 Final Score (04/23/2011) on MLB Gameday
22	April 24	@ Cardinals	ESPN	L 0–3	Westbrook (2–2)	Vólquez (2–1)	Boggs (3)	38,201	11–11	Reds 0, Cardinals 3 Final Score (04/24/2011) on MLB Gameday
23	April 25	@ Brewers	FSO	W 9–5	Arroyo (3–2)	Narveson (1–1)		35,794	12–11	Reds 9, Brewers 5 Final Score (04/25/2011) on MLB Gameday
24	April 26	@ Brewers	FSO	L 2–3	Loe (2–1)	Ondrusek (2–2)	Axford (5)	37,062	12–12	Reds 2, Brewers 3 Final Score (04/26/2011) on MLB Gameday
25	April 27	@ Brewers	FSO	W 7–6 (10)	Chapman (2–0)	Mitre (0–1)	Cordero (4)	33,848	13–12	Reds 7, Brewers 6 Final Score (04/27/2011) on MLB Gameday
26	April 29	Marlins	FSO	L 6–7	Vázquez (2–2)	Wood (1–3)	Oviedo (8)	27,051	13–13	Marlins 7, Reds 6 Final Score (04/29/2011) on MLB Gameday
27	April 30	Marlins	FSO	W 4–3 (10)	Cordero (1–0)	Dunn (1–1)		40,286	14–13	Marlins 3, Reds 4 Final Score (04/30/2011) on MLB Gameday

May (14–15): Home (8–5); Road (6–10)

#	Date	TV	Opponent	Score	Win	Loss	Save	Attendance	Record	Box
28	May 1	Marlins	FSO	L 5–9	Nolasco (3–0)	Arroyo (3–3)	Oviedo (9)	26,941	14–14	Marlins 9, Reds 5 Final Score (05/01/2011) on MLB Gameday
–	May 2	Astros	Postponed (rain); Makeup: May 5							
29	May 3	Astros	FSO	L 4–10	Happ (2–4)	Leake (3–1)		12,005	14–15	Astros 10, Reds 4 Final Score (05/03/2011) on MLB Gameday
30	May 4	Astros		W 3–2	Cordero (2–0)	Lyon (3–2)		12,340	15–15	Astros 2, Reds 3 Final Score (05/04/2011) on MLB Gameday
31	May 5	Astros	FSO	W 10–4	Bailey (1–0)	Myers (1–2)		14,765	16–15	Astros 4, Reds 10 Final Score (05/05/2011) on MLB Gameday
32	May 6	@ Cubs	FSO	W 5–4	Vólquez (3–1)	Garza (1–4)	Cordero (5)	35,471	17–15	Reds 5, Cubs 4 Final Score (05/06/2011) on MLB Gameday
33	May 7	@ Cubs	Fox	L 2–3	Mateo (1–1)	Cordero (2–1)		37,666	17–16	Reds 2, Cubs 3 Final Score (05/07/2011) on MLB Gameday
34	May 8	@ Cubs	FSO	W 2–0	Cueto (1–0)	Dempster (1–4)	Cordero (6)	31,931	18–16	Reds 2, Cubs 0 Final Score (05/08/2011) on MLB Gameday
35	May 9	@ Astros	FSO	W 6–1	Wood (2–3)	Rodríguez (0–1)		20,174	19–16	Reds 6, Astros 1 Final Score (05/09/2011) on MLB Gameday
36	May 10	@ Astros	FSO	W 7–3	Bailey (2–0)	Myers (1–3)		24,499	20–16	Reds 7, Astros 3 Final Score (05/10/2011) on MLB Gameday
37	May 11	@ Astros	FSO	L 3–4	Melancon (3–1)	Leake (3–2)		21,008	20–17	Reds 3, Astros 4 Final Score (05/11/2011) on MLB Gameday
38	May 13	Cardinals	FSO	W 6–5 (10)	Cordero (3–1)	Motte (1–1)		32,972	21–17	Cardinals 5, Reds 6 Final Score (05/13/2011) on MLB Gameday
39	May 14	Cardinals	FSO	W 7–3	Cueto (2–0)	McClellan (5–1)		41,307	22–17	Cardinals 3, Reds 7 Final Score (05/14/2011) on MLB Gameday
40	May 15	Cardinals	FSO	W 9–7	Wood (3–3)	Carpenter (1–3)	Cordero (7)	24,672	23–17	Cardinals 7, Reds 9 Final Score (05/15/2011) on MLB Gameday
41	May 16	Cubs	FSO	W 7–4	Bailey (3–0)	Zambrano (4–2)	Cordero (8)	16,981	24–17	Cubs 4, Reds 7 Final Score (05/16/2011) on MLB Gameday
42	May 17	Cubs	FSO	W 7–5	Bray (1–0)	Wood (1–3)	Masset (1)	18,861	25–17	Cubs 5, Reds 7 Final Score (05/17/2011) on MLB Gameday
43	May 18	Pirates	FSO	L 0–5	Morton (5–1)	Arroyo (3–4)		16,543	25–18	Pirates 5, Reds 0 Final Score (05/18/2011) on MLB Gameday
44	May 19	Pirates	MLBN	L 3–5	McDonald (3–3)	Cueto (2–1)	Hanrahan (12)	26,018	25–19	Pirates 5, Reds 3 Final Score (05/19/2011) on MLB Gameday
45	May 20	@ Indians	FSO	L 4–5	Pestano (1–0)	Bray (1–1)	Perez (11)	31,622	25–20	Reds 4, Indians 5 Final Score (05/20/2011) on MLB Gameday
46	May 21	@ Indians	FSO	L 1–2	Tomlin (6–1)	Bailey (3–1)	Perez (12)	40,631	25–21	Reds 1, Indians 2 Final Score (05/21/2011) on MLB Gameday
47	May 22	@ Indians	FSO	L 4–12	Carrasco (3–2)	Vólquez (3–2)		26,833	25–22	Reds 4, Indians 12 Final Score (05/22/2011) on MLB Gameday
48	May 23	@ Phillies	FSO	L 3–10	Hamels (6–2)	Arroyo (3–5)		45,841	25–23	Reds 3, Phillies 10 Final Score (05/23/2011) on MLB Gameday
49	May 24	@ Phillies	FSO	W 6–3	Ondrusek (3–2)	Madson (2–1)	Cordero (9)	45,740	26–23	Reds 6, Phillies 3 Final Score (05/24/2011) on MLB Gameday
50	May 25	@ Phillies	FSO	L 4–5 (19)	Valdez (1–0)	Fisher (0–1)		45,706	26–24	Reds 4, Phillies 5 Final Score (05/25/2011) on MLB Gameday
51	May 26	@ Phillies	FSO	L 4–10	Lee (4–4)	Thompson (0–1)		45,650	26–25	Reds 4, Phillies 10 Final Score (05/26/2011) on MLB Gameday
52	May 27	@ Braves	FSO	W 5–1	Leake (4–2)	Hanson (5–4)		30,701	27–25	Reds 5, Braves 1 Final Score (05/27/2011) on MLB Gameday
53	May 28	@ Braves	Fox	L 6–7 (12)	Linebrink (1–1)	Fisher (0–2)		36,615	27–26	Reds 6, Braves 7 Final Score (05/28/2011) on MLB Gameday
54	May 29	@ Braves	ESPN2	L 1–2	Jurrjens (7–1)	Cueto (2–2)	Kimbrel (15)	36,392	27–27	Reds 1, Braves 2 Final Score (05/29/2011) on MLB Gameday
55	May 30	Brewers	FSO	W 7–3	Wood (4–3)	Narveson (2–4)		21,564	28–27	Brewers 3, Reds 7 Final Score (05/30/2011) on MLB Gameday
56	May 31	Brewers	FSO	L 2–7	Greinke (4–1)	Reineke (0–1)		14,294	28–28	Brewers 7, Reds 2 Final Score (05/31/2011) on MLB Gameday

June (14–12): Home (6–7); Road (8–5)

#	Date	TV	Opponent	Score	Win	Loss	Save	Attendance	Record	Box
57	June 1	Brewers	FSO	W 4–3	Masset (1–3)	Loe (2–5)	Cordero (10)	22,213	29–28	Brewers 3, Reds 4 Final Score (06/01/2011) on MLB Gameday
58	June 3	Dodgers	FSO	W 2–1	Arroyo (4–5)	Kuroda (5–6)	Cordero (11)	31,402	30–28	Dodgers 1, Reds 2 Final Score (06/03/2011) on MLB Gameday
59	June 4	Dodgers	Fox	L 8–11 (11)	Guerra (1–0)	Fisher (0–3)		40,234	30–29	Dodgers 11, Reds 8 Final Score (06/04/2011) on MLB Gameday
60	June 5	Dodgers	FSO	L 6–9	Billingsley (5–4)	Wood (4–4)		28,327	30–30	Dodgers 9, Reds 6 Final Score (06/05/2011) on MLB Gameday
61	June 6	Cubs	FSO	W 8–2	Leake (5–2)	Garza (2–5)		22,568	31–30	Cubs 2, Reds 8 Final Score (06/06/2011) on MLB Gameday
62	June 7	Cubs	FSO	W 8–2	Vólquez (4–2)	Davis (0–5)		24,921	32–30	Cubs 2, Reds 8 Final Score (06/07/2011) on MLB Gameday
63	June 8	Cubs	FSO	L 1–4	Dempster (5–5)	Arroyo (4–6)	Mármol (11)	31,367	32–31	Cubs 4, Reds 1 Final Score (06/08/2011) on MLB Gameday
64	June 9	@ Giants	FSO	W 3–0	Cueto (3–2)	Bumgarner (2–8)	Cordero (12)	41,106	33–31	Reds 3, Giants 0 Final Score (06/09/2011) on MLB Gameday
65	June 10	@ Giants	FSO	L 2–3	Wilson (5–1)	Arredondo (0–1)		41,686	33–32	Reds 2, Giants 3 Final Score (06/10/2011) on MLB Gameday
66	June 11	@ Giants	Fox	W 10–2	Leake (6–2)	Lincecum (5–5)		41,735	34–32	Reds 10, Giants 2 Final Score (06/11/2011) on MLB Gameday
67	June 12	@ Giants	ESPN	L 2–4	Ramírez (2–0)	Arredondo (0–2)	Wilson (18)	42,084	34–33	Reds 2, Giants 4 Final Score (06/12/2011) on MLB Gameday
68	June 13	@ Dodgers	FSO	W 6–4	Arroyo (5–6)	Kuroda (5–8)	Cordero (13)	31,372	35–33	Reds 6, Dodgers 4 Final Score (06/13/2011) on MLB Gameday
69	June 14	@ Dodgers	FSO	W 3–2	Cueto (4–2)	Hawksworth (1–2)	Cordero (14)	39,233	36–33	Reds 3, Dodgers 2 Final Score (06/14/2011) on MLB Gameday
70	June 15	@ Dodgers	FSO	W 7–2	Wood (5–4)	Billingsley (5–6)		30,433	37–33	Reds 7, Dodgers 2 Final Score (06/15/2011) on MLB Gameday
71	June 17	Blue Jays	FSO	L 2–3	Reyes (3–5)	Leake (6–3)	Francisco (7)	32,026	37–34	Blue Jays 3, Reds 2 Final Score (06/17/2011) on MLB Gameday
72	June 18	Blue Jays	FSO	L 0–4	Morrow (3–4)	Vólquez (4–3)		31,688	37–35	Blue Jays 4, Reds 0 Final Score (06/18/2011) on MLB Gameday
73	June 19	Blue Jays	FSO	W 2–1	Arroyo (6–6)	Villanueva (4–1)	Cordero (15)	32,618	38–35	Blue Jays 1, Reds 2 Final Score (06/19/2011) on MLB Gameday
74	June 20	Yankees	FSO	L 3–5	Nova (7–4)	Wood (5–5)	Rivera (18)	41,173	38–36	Yankees 5, Reds 3 Final Score (06/20/2011) on MLB Gameday
–	June 21	Yankees	FSO	Postponed (rain); Makeup: June 22 (Game 2)						
75	June 22	Yankees	FSO	L 2–4	García (6–6)	Leake (6–4)	Rivera (19)	40,040	38–37	Yankees 4, Reds 2 Final Score (06/22/2011) on MLB Gameday
76	June 22	Yankees	FSO	W 10–2	Cueto (5–2)	Gordon (0–1)		41,367	39–37	Yankees 2, Reds 10 Final Score (06/22/2011) on MLB Gameday
77	June 24	@ Orioles	FSO	L 4–5 (12)	Gonzalez (1–1)	Arredondo (0–3)		45,382	39–38	Reds 4, Orioles 5 Final Score (06/24/2011) on MLB Gameday
78	June 25	@ Orioles	FSO	W 10–5	Arroyo (7–6)	Matusz (1–3)		38,976	40–38	Reds 10, Orioles 5 Final Score (06/25/2011) on MLB Gameday
79	June 26	@ Orioles	FSO	L 5–7	Guthrie (3–9)	Bailey (3–2)	Gregg (14)	27,809	40–39	Reds 5, Orioles 7 Final Score (06/26/2011) on MLB Gameday
80	June 27	@ Rays	FSO	W 5–0	Leake (7–4)	Hellickson (7–7)		19,891	41–39	Reds 5, Rays 0 Final Score (06/27/2011) on MLB Gameday
81	June 28	@ Rays	FSO	L 3–4	Farnsworth (3–1)	Ondrusek (3–3)		20,894	41–40	Reds 3, Rays 4 Final Score (06/28/2011) on MLB Gameday
82	June 29	@ Rays	FSO	W 4–3	Vólquez (5–3)	Shields (8–5)	Cordero (16)	25,968	42–40	Reds 4, Rays 3 Final Score (06/29/2011) on MLB Gameday

July (11–15): Home (8–8); Road (3–7)

#	Date	TV	Opponent	Score	Win	Loss	Save	Attendance	Record	Box
83	July 1	Indians	FSO	L 2–8	Masterson (6–6)	Arroyo (7–7)		40,440	42–41	Indians 8, Reds 2 Final Score (07/01/2011) on MLB Gameday
84	July 2	Indians	Fox	L 1–3	Herrmann (1–0)	Bailey (3–3)	Pestano (1)	41,580	42–42	Indians 3, Reds 1 Final Score (07/02/2011) on MLB Gameday
85	July 3	Indians	FSO	W 7–5	Leake (8–4)	Talbot (2–5)	Cordero (17)	34,948	43–42	Indians 5, Reds 7 Final Score (07/03/2011) on MLB Gameday
86	July 4	@ Cardinals	FSO	L 0–1	Carpenter (4–7)	Cueto (5–3)	Salas (15)	40,551	43–43	Reds 0, Cardinals 1 Final Score (07/04/2011) on MLB Gameday
87	July 5	@ Cardinals	FSO	L 1–8	García (8–3)	Vólquez (5–4)		36,090	43–44	Reds 1, Cardinals 8 Final Score (07/05/2011) on MLB Gameday
88	July 6	@ Cardinals	FSO	W 9–8 (13)	Arredondo (1–3)	Valdés (0–1)	Chapman (1)	37,223	44–44	Reds 9, Cardinals 8 Final Score (07/06/2011) on MLB Gameday
89	July 7	@ Brewers	FSO	L 4–5	Narveson (6–5)	Bailey (3–4)	Axford (23)	34,102	44–45	Reds 4, Brewers 5 Final Score (07/07/2011) on MLB Gameday
90	July 8	@ Brewers	FSO	L 7–8	Estrada (2–5)	Cordero (3–2)		39,050	44–46	Reds 7, Brewers 8 Final Score (07/08/2011) on MLB Gameday
91	July 9	@ Brewers	FSO	W 8–4 (10)	Bray (2–1)	Estrada (2–6)		43,119	45–46	Reds 8, Brewers 4 Final Score (07/09/2011) on MLB Gameday
92	July 10	@ Brewers	FSO	L 3–4	Loe (3–7)	Cordero (3–3)		43,896	45–47	Reds 3, Brewers 4 Final Score (07/10/2011) on MLB Gameday
July 12: 2011 MLB All-Star Game – Phoenix, Arizona at Chase Field
93	July 15	Cardinals	FSO	W 6–5	Ondrusek (4–3)	Salas (5–3)		41,238	46–47	Cardinals 5, Reds 6 Final Score (07/15/2011) on MLB Gameday
94	July 16	Cardinals	FSO	L 1–4	Carpenter (5–7)	Arroyo (7–8)	Salas (17)	40,204	46–48	Cardinals 4, Reds 1 Final Score (07/16/2011) on MLB Gameday
95	July 17	Cardinals	FSO	W 3–1	Bailey (4–4)	García (9–4)	Cordero (18)	24,841	47–48	Cardinals 1, Reds 3 Final Score (07/17/2011) on MLB Gameday
96	July 18	@ Pirates	FSO	L 0–2	Morton (8–5)	Willis (0–1)	Hanrahan (27)	22,016	47–49	Reds 0, Pirates 2 Final Score (07/18/2011) on MLB Gameday
97	July 19	@ Pirates	FSO	L 0–1	McDonald (6–4)	Leake (8–5)	Hanrahan (28)	26,058	47–50	Reds 0, Pirates 1 Final Score (07/19/2011) on MLB Gameday
98	July 20	@ Pirates	FSO	W 3–1	Cueto (6–3)	Karstens (8–5)	Cordero (19)	25,207	48–50	Reds 3, Pirates 1 Final Score (07/20/2011) on MLB Gameday
99	July 22	Braves	FSO	L 4–6	Venters (5–1)	Masset (1–4)	Kimbrel (31)	34,118	48–51	Braves 6, Reds 4 Final Score (07/22/2011) on MLB Gameday
100	July 23	Braves	Fox	W 11–2	Bailey (5–4)	Lowe (6–8)		41,192	49–51	Braves 2, Reds 11 Final Score (07/23/2011) on MLB Gameday
101	July 24	Braves	ESPN	W 4–3	Cordero (4–3)	Linebrink (3–2)		33,036	50–51	Braves 3, Reds 4 Final Score (07/24/2011) on MLB Gameday
102	July 25	Mets	FSO	L 2–4	Dickey (5–8)	Leake (8–6)	Isringhausen (3)	25,480	50–52	Mets 4, Reds 2 Final Score (07/25/2011) on MLB Gameday
103	July 26	Mets	FSO	L 6–8	Niese (10–8)	Cueto (6–4)	Byrdak (1)	27,552	50–53	Mets 8, Reds 6 Final Score (07/26/2011) on MLB Gameday
104	July 27	Mets	FSO	L 2–8	Pelfrey (6–9)	Arroyo (7–9)		23,616	50–54	Mets 8, Reds 2 Final Score (07/27/2011) on MLB Gameday
105	July 28	Mets	FSO	L 9–10	Capuano (9–10)	Bailey (5–5)	Isringhausen (4)	25,400	50–55	Mets 10, Reds 9 Final Score (07/28/2011) on MLB Gameday
106	July 29	Giants	FSO	W 4–3 (13)	Arredondo (2–3)	Wilson (6–3)		29,016	51–55	Giants 3, Reds 4 Final Score (07/29/2011) on MLB Gameday
107	July 30	Giants	FSO	W 7–2	Leake (9–6)	Bumgarner (6–10)		40,402	52–55	Giants 2, Reds 7 Final Score (07/30/2011) on MLB Gameday
108	July 31	Giants	FSO	W 9–0	Cueto (7–4)	Zito (3–4)		37,864	53–55	Giants 0, Reds 9 Final Score (07/31/2011) on MLB Gameday

August (14–14): Home (7–6); Road (7–8)

#	Date	TV	Opponent	Score	Win	Loss	Save	Attendance	Record	Box
109	August 1	@ Astros	FSO	L 3–4 (10)	Melancon (6–3)	Ondrusek (4–4)		21,502	53–56	Reds 3, Astros 4 Final Score (08/01/2011) on MLB Gameday
110	August 2	@ Astros	FSO	W 5–1	Bailey (6–5)	Rodríguez (7–8)		22,603	54–56	Reds 5, Astros 1 Final Score (08/02/2011) on MLB Gameday
111	August 3	@ Astros	FSO	L 4–5	Lyles (1–6)	Masset (1–5)	Melancon (11)	22,102	54–57	Reds 4, Astros 5 Final Score (08/03/2011) on MLB Gameday
112	August 5	@ Cubs	FSO	L 3–4	Dempster (9–8)	Leake (9–7)	Mármol (24)	42,245	54–58	Reds 3, Cubs 4 Final Score (08/05/2011) on MLB Gameday
113	August 6	@ Cubs	FSO	L 4–11	Zambrano (9–6)	Cueto (7–5)		41,978	54–59	Reds 4, Cubs 11 Final Score (08/06/2011) on MLB Gameday
114	August 7	@ Cubs	FSO	W 8–7	Masset (2–5)	Marshall (5–5)	Cordero (20)	39,619	55–59	Reds 8, Cubs 7 Final Score (08/07/2011) on MLB Gameday
115	August 8	Rockies	FSO	L 7–10	Belisle (6–4)	Bray (2–2)	Street (29)	27,055	55–60	Rockies 10, Reds 7 Final Score (08/08/2011) on MLB Gameday
116	August 9	Rockies	FSO	L 2–3	Rogers (6–1)	Willis (0–2)	Betancourt (1)	17,378	55–61	Rockies 3, Reds 2 Final Score (08/09/2011) on MLB Gameday
117	August 10	Rockies	FSO	W 3–2	Leake (10–7)	Millwood (0–1)	Cordero (21)	21,673	56–61	Rockies 2, Reds 3 Final Score (08/10/2011) on MLB Gameday
118	August 11	Rockies	FSO	W 2–1	Cueto (8–5)	Chacín (9–9)	Cordero (22)	20,546	57–61	Rockies 1, Reds 2 Final Score (08/11/2011) on MLB Gameday
119	August 12	Padres	FSO	W 5–3	Bray (3–2)	Spence (0–1)	Cordero (23)	28,346	58–61	Padres 3, Reds 5 Final Score (08/12/2011) on MLB Gameday
120	August 13	Padres	FSO	W 13–1	Bailey (7–5)	Stauffer (7–9)		31,374	59–61	Padres 1, Reds 13 Final Score (08/13/2011) on MLB Gameday
121	August 14	Padres	FSO	L 3–7	LeBlanc (1–2)	Willis (0–3)		35,286	59–62	Padres 7, Reds 3 Final Score (08/14/2011) on MLB Gameday
122	August 16	@ Nationals	FSO	L 4–6	Wang (2–2)	Leake (10–8)	Storen (32)	23,888	59–63	Reds 4, Nationals 6 Final Score (08/16/2011) on MLB Gameday
123	August 17	@ Nationals	FSO	W 2–1	Cueto (9–5)	Detwiler (1–3)	Cordero (24)	20,374	60–63	Reds 2, Nationals 1 Final Score (08/17/2011) on MLB Gameday
124	August 18	@ Nationals	FSO	L 1–3	Zimmermann (8–10)	Arroyo (7–10)	Storen (33)	19,508	60–64	Reds 1, Nationals 3 Final Score (08/18/2011) on MLB Gameday
125	August 19	@ Pirates	FSO	W 11–8	Wood (6–5)	Hanrahan (0–2)	Cordero (25)	36,620	61–64	Reds 11, Pirates 8 Final Score (08/19/2011) on MLB Gameday
126	August 20	@ Pirates	Fox	L 3–5	Watson (1–2)	Chapman (2–1)	Hanrahan (31)	37,826	61–65	Reds 3, Pirates 5 Final Score (08/20/2011) on MLB Gameday
127	August 21	@ Pirates	FSO	W 5–4	Arredondo (3–3)	Hanrahan (0–3)	Cordero (26)	29,967	62–65	Reds 5, Pirates 4 Final Score (08/21/2011) on MLB Gameday
128	August 23	@ Marlins	FSO	W 8–6	Chapman (3–1)	Oviedo (1–4)	Cordero (27)	21,204	63–65	Reds 8, Marlins 6 Final Score (08/23/2011) on MLB Gameday
129	August 24	@ Marlins	FSO	L 5–6	Webb (2–4)	Arredondo (3–4)	Cishek (2)		63–66	Reds 5, Marlins 6 Final Score (08/24/2011) on MLB Gameday
130	August 24	@ Marlins	FSO	W 3–2	Arroyo (8–10)	Volstad (5–11)	Cordero (28)	22,505	64–66	Reds 3, Marlins 2 Final Score (08/24/2011) on MLB Gameday
–	August 25	@ Marlins	Postponed (impending weather); Played on August 24 (Game 2)							
131	August 26	Nationals	FSO	W 4–3	Cordero (5–3)	Balester (1–2)		35,089	65–66	Nationals 3, Reds 4 Final Score (08/26/2011) on MLB Gameday
132	August 27	Nationals	FSO	W 6–3	Leake (11–8)	Detwiler (2–4)	Cordero (29)	30,423	66–66	Nationals 3, Reds 6 Final Score (08/27/2011) on MLB Gameday
133	August 28	Nationals	FSO	W 5–4 (14)	Bray (4–2)	Balester (1–3)		28,415	67–66	Nationals 4, Reds 5 Final Score (08/28/2011) on MLB Gameday
134	August 29	Phillies	FSO	L 2–3	Bastardo (6–0)	Bailey (7–6)	Madson (24)	21,360	67–67	Phillies 3, Reds 2 Final Score (08/29/2011) on MLB Gameday
135	August 30	Phillies	FSO	L 0–9	Halladay (16–5)	Arroyo (8–11)		19,317	67–68	Phillies 9, Reds 0 Final Score (08/30/2011) on MLB Gameday
136	August 31	Phillies	FSO	L 0–3	Lee (15–7)	Willis (0–4)	Madson (25)	18,567	67–69	Phillies 3, Reds 0 Final Score (08/31/2011) on MLB Gameday

September (12–14): Home (5–6); Road (7–8)

#	Date	TV	Opponent	Score	Win	Loss	Save	Attendance	Record	Box
137	September 1	Phillies	FSO	L 4–6	Worley (10–1)	Leake (11–9)	Madson (26)	21,438	67–70	Phillies 6, Reds 4 Final Score (09/01/2011) on MLB Gameday
138	September 2	@ Cardinals	FSO	W 11–8	Arredondo (4–4)	Rzepczynski (2–4)		36,970	68–70	Reds 11, Cardinals 8 Final Score (09/02/2011) on MLB Gameday
139	September 3	@ Cardinals	Fox	L 4–6	García (11–7)	Bailey (7–7)	Motte (2)	41,839	68–71	Reds 4, Cardinals 6 Final Score (09/03/2011) on MLB Gameday
140	September 4	@ Cardinals	FSO	W 3–2 (10)	Bray (5–2)	Salas (5–6)	Cordero (30)	41,647	69–71	Reds 3, Cardinals 2 Final Score (09/04/2011) on MLB Gameday
141	September 5	@ Cubs	FSO	L 3–4	Garza (8–10)	Willis (0–5)	Mármol (32)	41,341	69–72	Reds 3, Cubs 4 Final Score (09/05/2011) on MLB Gameday
142	September 6	@ Cubs	FSO	W 4–2 (13)	Chapman (4–1)	Grabow (3–1)	Cordero (31)	35,297	70–72	Reds 4, Cubs 2 Final Score (09/06/2011) on MLB Gameday
143	September 7	@ Cubs	FSO	L 3–6	Wood (2–5)	Ondrusek (4–5)	Mármol (33)	36,797	70–73	Reds 3, Cubs 6 Final Score (09/07/2011) on MLB Gameday
144	September 9	@ Rockies	FSO	W 4–1	Bailey (8–7)	Chacín (11–11)	Cordero (32)	39,933	71–73	Reds 4, Rockies 1 Final Score (09/09/2011) on MLB Gameday
145	September 10	@ Rockies		L 7–12	White (3–1)	Maloney (0–2)		38,407	71–74	Reds 7, Rockies 12 Final Score (09/10/2011) on MLB Gameday
146	September 11	@ Rockies	FSO	L 1–4	Pomeranz (1–0)	Vólquez (5–5)	Hammel (1)	39,240	71–75	Reds 1, Rockies 4 Final Score (09/11/2011) on MLB Gameday
147	September 12	Cubs	FSO	L 8–12	López (5–6)	Willis (0–6)		19,874	71–76	Cubs 12, Reds 8 Final Score (09/12/2011) on MLB Gameday
148	September 13	Cubs	FSO	W 2–1	Leake (12–9)	Dempster (10–12)	Cordero (33)	19,159	72–76	Cubs 1, Reds 2 Final Score (09/13/2011) on MLB Gameday
149	September 14	Cubs	FSO	W 7–2	LeCure (1–1)	Coleman (2–8)		18,304	73–76	Cubs 2, Reds 7 Final Score (09/14/2011) on MLB Gameday
150	September 15	Cubs	FSO	W 8–6 (11)	Masset (3–5)	Russell (1–6)		23,792	74–76	Cubs 6, Reds 8 Final Score (09/15/2011) on MLB Gameday
151	September 16	Brewers	FSO	L 3–6	Wolf (13–9)	Arroyo (8–12)	Axford (43)	32,506	74–77	Brewers 6, Reds 3 Final Score (09/16/2011) on MLB Gameday
152	September 17	Brewers	FSO	L 1–10	Gallardo (17–10)	Vólquez (5–6)		39,766	74–78	Brewers 10, Reds 1 Final Score (09/17/2011) on MLB Gameday
153	September 18	Brewers	FSO	L 1–8	Greinke (15–6)	Maloney (0–3)		37,845	74–79	Brewers 8, Reds 1 Final Score (09/18/2011) on MLB Gameday
154	September 19	Astros	FSO	L 2–3	Carpenter (1–3)	Masset (3–6)	Melancon (19)	21,168	74–80	Astros 3, Reds 2 Final Score (09/19/2011) on MLB Gameday
155	September 20	Astros	FSO	W 6–4	Bailey (9–7)	Norris (6–11)	Cordero (34)	23,847	75–80	Astros 4, Reds 6 Final Score (09/20/2011) on MLB Gameday
156	September 21	Astros	FSO	W 2–0	Arroyo (9–12)	Rodríguez (11–11)		20,875	76–80	Astros 0, Reds 2 Final Score (09/21/2011) on MLB Gameday
157	September 23	@ Pirates	FSO	L 3–4	Hanrahan (1–4)	Bray (5–3)		23,632	76–81	Reds 3, Pirates 4 Final Score (09/23/2011) on MLB Gameday
158	September 24	@ Pirates	FSO	L 3–4	Lincoln (2–3)	Wood (6–6)	Grilli (1)	37,388	76–82	Reds 3, Pirates 4 Final Score (09/24/2011) on MLB Gameday
159	September 25	@ Pirates	FSO	W 5–4	Willis (1–6)	Moskos (1–1)	Cordero (35)	28,758	77–82	Reds 5, Pirates 4 Final Score (09/25/2011) on MLB Gameday
160	September 26	@ Mets	FSO	W 6–5	Ondrusek (5–5)	Byrdak (2–1)	Cordero (36)	28,651	78–82	Reds 6, Mets 5 Final Score (09/26/2011) on MLB Gameday
161	September 27	@ Mets	FSO	W 5–4 (13)	LeCure (2–1)	Thayer (0–3)	Cordero (37)	30,027	79–82	Reds 5, Mets 4 Final Score (09/27/2011) on MLB Gameday
162	September 28	@ Mets	FSO	L 0–3	Batista (5–2)	Vólquez (5–7)		28,816	79–83	Reds 0, Mets 3 Final Score (09/28/2011) on MLB Gameday

Legend
Reds Win
Reds loss
Game Postponed

== Roster ==
2011 Cincinnati Reds
Roster
Pitchers: 33 José Arredondo; 61 Bronson Arroyo; 34 Homer Bailey; 45 Bill Bray; 51 Jared Burton; 54 Aroldis Chapman; 48 Francisco Cordero; 47 Johnny Cueto; 46 Carlos Fisher; 57 Jeremy Horst; 63 Sam LeCure; 44 Mike Leake; 56 Matt Maloney; 40 Nick Masset; 66 Logan Ondrusek; 52 Chad Reineke; 62 Jordan Smith; 58 Daryl Thompson; 36 Edinson Vólquez; 50 Dontrelle Willis; 30 Travis Wood	Catchers: 29 Ryan Hanigan; 55 Ramón Hernández; 39 Devin Mesoraco; Infielders: 43 Miguel Cairo; 2 Zack Cozart; 25 Juan Francisco; 21 Todd Frazier; 7 Paul Janish; 4 Brandon Phillips; 16 Édgar Rentería; 27 Scott Rolen; 3 Chris Valaika; 19 Joey Votto	Outfielders: 23 Yonder Alonso; 32 Jay Bruce; 31 Jonny Gomes; 28 Chris Heisey; 26 Jeremy Hermida; 15 Fred Lewis; 17 Dave Sappelt; 6 Drew Stubbs	Manager: 12 Dusty Baker; Coaches: 41 Mark Berry (third base); 22 Billy Hatcher (first base); 49 Brook Jacoby (hitting); 59 Juan López (bullpen); 38 Bryan Price (pitching); 35 Chris Speier (bench); 72 Mike Stefanski (bullpen catcher)

== Player stats ==
=== Batting ===
Note: Pos = Position; G = Games played; AB = At bats; H = Hits; Avg. = Batting average; HR = Home runs; RBI = Runs batted in

Pos	Player	G	AB	H	Avg.	HR	RBI
C	Ryan Hanigan	91	266	71	.267	6	31
C	Ramón Hernández	91	298	84	.282	12	36
C	Devin Mesoraco	18	50	9	.180	2	6
1B/3B	Miguel Cairo	102	245	65	.265	8	33
SS	Zack Cozart	11	37	6	.324	2	3
1B/3B	Juan Francisco	30	90	24	.267	3	15
3B	Todd Frazier	41	112	26	.232	6	15
SS	Paul Janish	114	336	72	.214	0	23
2B	Brandon Phillips	150	610	183	.300	18	82
SS	Édgar Rentería	98	295	74	.251	5	36
3B	Scott Rolen	65	252	61	.241	5	36
3B	Chris Valaika	14	25	7	.280	0	0
1B	Joey Votto	160	596	185	.310	29	103
OF	Yonder Alonso	47	88	29	.330	5	15
RF	Jay Bruce	156	581	100	.258	32	97
OF	Chris Heisey	120	279	71	.254	18	50
OF	Fred Lewis	81	183	42	.230	3	19
OF	Dave Sappelt	38	107	26	.243	0	5
CF	Drew Stubbs	157	600	147	.245	15	44
P	José Arredondo	50	2	1	.500	0	0
P	Bronson Arroyo	35	57	6	.105	0	2
P	Homer Bailey	21	39	11	.282	0	2
P	Johnny Cueto	23	47	3	.064	0	0
P	Carlos Fisher	17	2	0	.000	0	0
P	Jeremy Horst	12	1	1	1.000	0	1
P	Mike Leake	37	55	11	.200	0	2
P	Dontrelle Willis	16	31	12	.387	1	4
P	Edinson Vólquez	18	26	3	.115	0	0
P	Travis Wood	25	30	2	.067	1	3
P	Sam LeCure	40	9	1	.111	0	0
P	Matt Maloney	8	4	0	.000	0	0
P	Chad Reineke	2	2	0	.000	0	0
P	Jordan Smith	16	2	0	.000	0	0
P	Daryl Thompson	1	1	0	.000	0	0
	Team Totals	162	5612	1438	.256	183	697

Stats through September 28, 2011

=== Pitching ===
==== Starting pitchers ====
Note: G = Games pitched; IP = Innings pitched; W = Wins; L = Losses; ERA = Earned run average; SO = Strikeouts; WHIP = Walks and hits per inning pitched

Player	G	IP	W	L	ERA	SO	WHIP
Bronson Arroyo	32	199.0	9	12	5.07	108	1.37
Homer Bailey	22	132.0	9	7	4.43	106	1.28
Johnny Cueto	24	156.0	9	5	2.31	104	1.09
Mike Leake	29	167.2	12	9	3.86	118	1.17
Edinson Vólquez	19	108.2	5	7	5.71	104	1.57
Dontrelle Willis	13	75.2	1	6	5.00	57	1.52

Stats through September 28, 2011

==== Relief pitchers ====
Note: G = Games pitched; W = Wins; L = Losses; SV = Saves; IP = Innings pitched; ERA = Earned run average; SO = Strikeouts; WHIP = Walks and hits per inning pitched

Player	G	W	L	SV	IP	ERA	SO	WHIP
José Arredondo	53	4	4	0	53.0	3.29	46	1.42
Jared Burton	6	0	0	0	4.2	3.86	3	1.93
Bill Bray	79	5	3	0	48.1	2.98	44	1.08
Aroldis Chapman	54	4	1	1	50.0	3.60	70	1.30
Francisco Cordero	68	5	3	37	69.2	2.45	42	1.02
Carlos Fisher	17	0	3	0	24.0	4.50	17	1.50
Jeremy Horst	12	0	0	0	15.1	2.93	9	1.57
Sam LeCure	43	2	1	0	77.2	3.71	73	1.00
Matt Maloney	8	0	3	0	18.2	9.16	13	2.14
Nick Masset	75	3	6	1	70.1	3.71	62	1.52
Logan Ondrusek	66	5	5	0	61.1	3.23	41	1.35
Chad Reineke	2	0	1	0	6.2	3.04	3	1.65
Jordan Smith	17	0	0	0	20.0	7.20	13	2.00
Daryl Thompson	1	0	1	0	3.0	15.00	0	3.67
Travis Wood	18	6	6	0	106.0	4.84	76	1.49
Team Pitching Totals	162	79	83	39	1467.2	4.16	1112	1.33

Stats through September 28, 2011

== Farm System ==
=== Minor league standings ===
Standings as of: September 14, 2011

Level	Team	League	Manager	W	L	Position
AAA	Louisville Bats	International League	Rick Sweet	73	71	3rd Place, INT West (15 GB)
AA	Carolina Mudcats	Southern League	David Bell	30	39	(2nd Half) 3rd Place, SOU North (12 GB)
High-A	Bakersfield Blaze	California League	Ken Griffey	31	39	(2nd Half) 4th Place, CAL North (10 GB)
Low-A	Dayton Dragons	Midwest League	Delino DeShields	48	22	(2nd Half) 1st Place, MWL East (– GB)
Rookie	Billings Mustangs	Pioneer League	Pat Kelly	24	14	(2nd Half) 2nd Place, PIO North (1 GB)
Rookie	AZL Reds	Arizona League	José Nieves	31	25	2nd Place, AZL Central (3 GB)
Rookie	DSL Reds	Dominican Summer League	Joel Noboa	32	36	5th place, DSL BCBC (13 GB)
Rookie	VSL Reds	Venezuelan Summer League	Richard Paz	38	34	Tied for 3rd Place, VSL (2 GB)
