= Carlos Fisher =

American baseball player (born 1983)

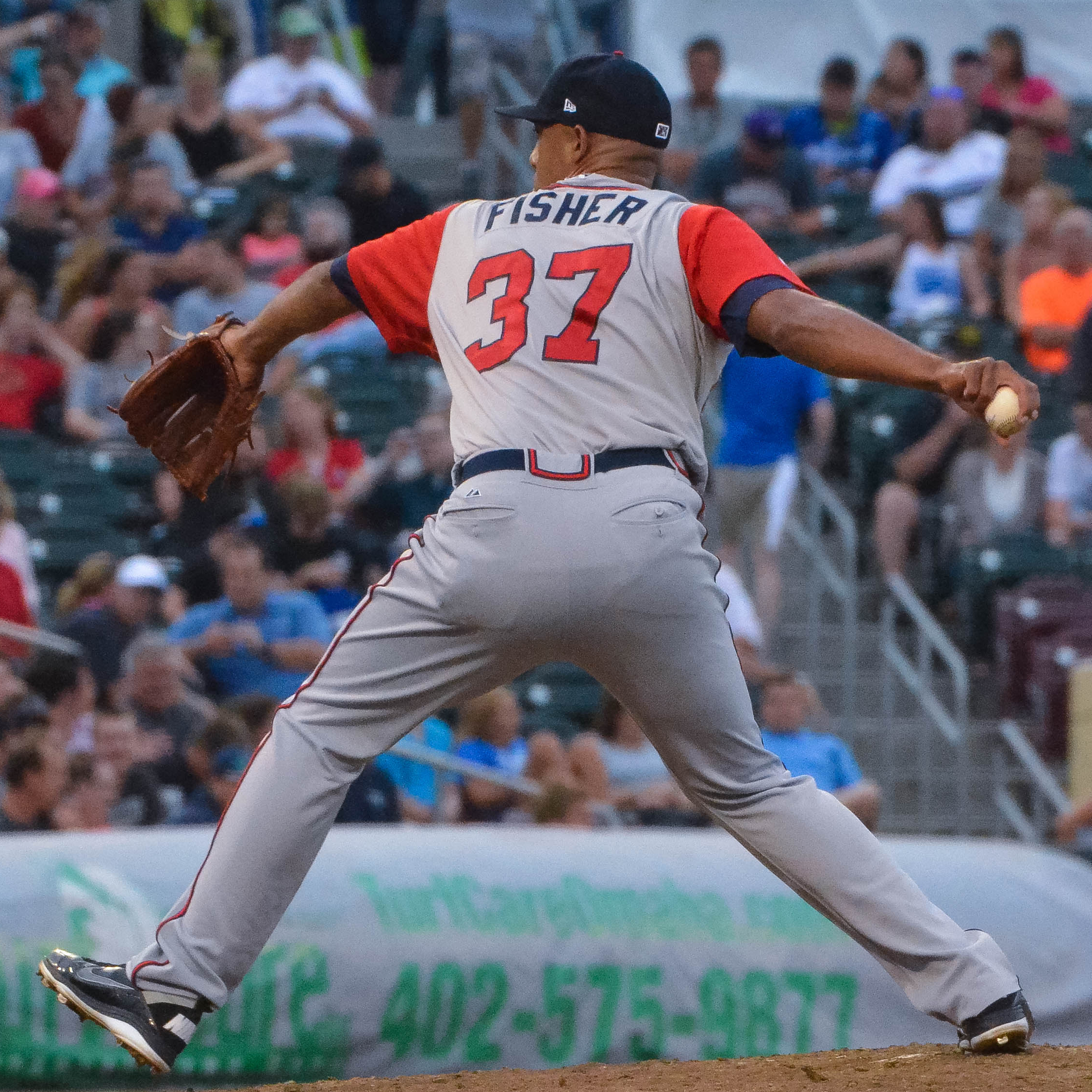
- Fisher, during his tenure with the Gwinnett Braves, at 2015 Triple-A All-Star Game
- Relief pitcher
- Born: February 22, 1983 (age 43); West Covina, California, U.S.
- Batted: Right Threw: Right

MLB debut
- May 24, 2009, for the Cincinnati Reds

Last MLB appearance
- September 24, 2011, for the Cincinnati Reds

MLB statistics
- Win–loss record: 2-5
- Earned run average: 4.74
- Strikeouts: 86
- Stats at Baseball Reference

Teams
- Cincinnati Reds (2009–2011)

Charles Edward "Carlos" Fisher (born February 22, 1983) is an American former professional baseball pitcher. He played in Major League Baseball (MLB) for the Cincinnati Reds.

== Early life ==
Fisher graduated from Duarte High School (Duarte, California) in 2001. He attended Citrus Community College in Glendora, California, before attending Lewis-Clark State College in Lewiston, Idaho.

== Professional career ==
=== Cincinnati Reds ===
The Cincinnati Reds drafted Fisher in the 11th round (332nd overall) of the 2005 Major League Baseball draft. He was signed by scout Howard Bowens.

Fisher started his career as a starting pitcher with the rookie-level Billings Mustangs in 2005, where he went 4–4 with a 4.19 ERA. He was Pioneer League Pitcher of the Week on June 26, 2005.

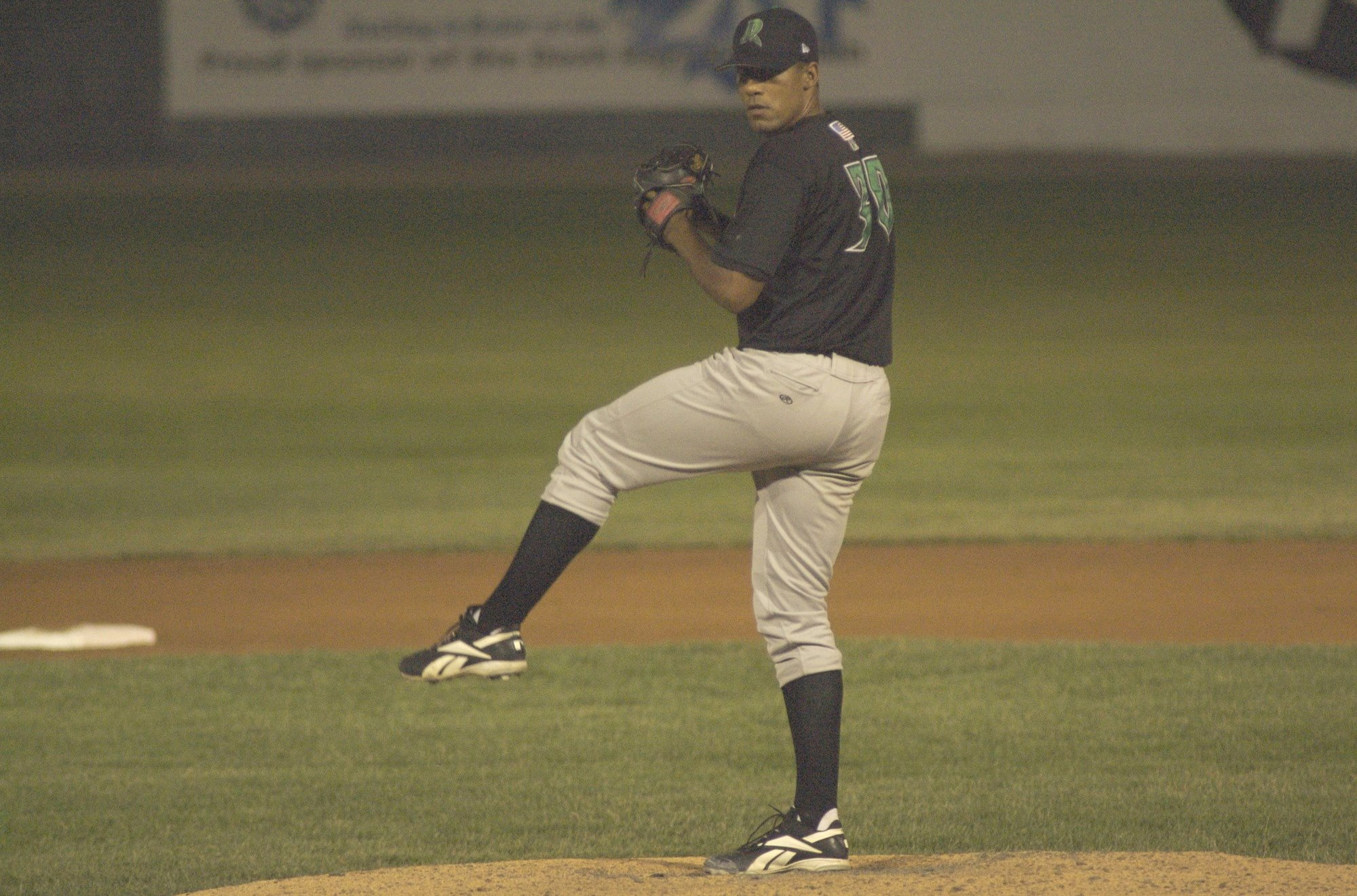
Fisher pitching for the Dayton Dragons, Single-A affiliates of the Cincinnati Reds, in 2006

He spent the 2006 season with the Single-A Dayton Dragons. He went 12–5 with a 2.76 ERA in 150 innings. Fisher was Midwest League Pitcher of the Week on April 23, 2006.

Carlos pitched seven games for the Sarasota Reds in 2007, going 4–1 with a 2.20 ERA. He was Florida State League Pitcher of the Week on April 16, 2007. The Reds promoted him to the Chattanooga Lookouts, their Double-A affiliate, and he 5–9 with a 4.29 ERA. Fisher was Southern League Pitcher of the Week on July 23. He was named to the mid-season All-Star teams for the FSL, Southern League, and Texas League in 2007.

Fisher was converted to a reliever in 2008. He started the year with Chattanooga. He went 1–5 with a 3.73 ERA in 36 games, along with eight saves. He was then promoted to the Triple-A Louisville Bats. In 14 games, he was 5–0 with a 1.04 ERA. Fisher participated in the 2008 Arizona Fall League as a member of the Peoria Javelinas. He pitched in 10 games (10 innings), struck out 10 batters and notched three saves, but was 0–1 with a 10.80 ERA. He was added to the Reds' 40-man roster on November 20, 2008.

Fisher started the 2009 season with Louisville. In 18 innings, he was 2–0 with a 2.00 ERA. The Reds recalled him on May 22, 2009.

On May 24, 2009, Fisher made his MLB debut in the eleventh inning of a 3–3 game against the Cleveland Indians. In his first Major League appearance, Fisher pitched one scoreless inning and earned the win after Alex Gonzalez hit a walk-off RBI double in the bottom of the inning. The win made him the first Reds pitcher to earn a win his debut since Héctor Carrasco did on April 4, 1994. He got his first big league strikeout against the first batter he faced (Kelly Shoppach). Fisher was sent down to the Single-A Sarasota Reds between games of a doubleheader on August 31. He pitched two scoreless innings in two games for Sarasota before being recalled again as a September call-up. Fisher finished the season with the Reds, and his 2009 MLB totals were 1-1, 4.47 ERA, 52 1/3 innings pitched, 48 strikeouts, and 31 walks.

Fisher split the 2010 season with the Reds and the Bats. He started the season with Louisville, but was called up to replace Logan Ondrusek. He was sent down and called up a few more times, including being called up in favor of Aroldis Chapman when Russ Springer went on the disabled list. Fisher went 1–1 with a 2.23 ERA for Louisville across 30 appearances. In 18 games for the Reds, he went 1–1 with a 5.64 ERA. Fisher was left off the Reds post-season roster.

Fisher spent 2011 split between the Reds and the Bats yet again. Fisher went 4–1 for Triple-A Louisville with an ERA of 3.35 in 40 1/3 innings of work. With the Reds he went 0–3 with an ERA of 4.50 in 24 innings of work. One of his losses in the majors in 2011 was a 19 inning game that he gave up the walk-off hit. The winner in this game was the Phillies' starting second baseman that day Wilson Valdez. This was the first time a player started the game in the field and won the game on the mound since Babe Ruth.

On February 8, 2012, Fisher was designated for assignment by the Reds following the signing of Ryan Ludwick. He cleared waivers and was sent outright to Louisville on February 15.

=== Oakland Athletics ===
On January 28, 2013, Fisher signed a minor league contract with the Oakland Athletics. He made 37 relief appearances for the Double-A Midland RockHounds, posting a 1–2 record and 3.88 ERA with 71 strikeouts across 48 2/3 innings pitched. Fisher was released by the Athletics organization on August 15.

=== Tampa Bay Rays ===
On August 17, 2013, Fisher signed a minor league contract with the Tampa Bay Rays organization. He made five appearances for the Double-A Montgomery Biscuits, recording a 4.50 ERA with seven strikeouts over eight innings of work. Fisher elected free agency following the season on November 4.

=== Somerset Patriots ===
Fisher started 2014 with the Somerset Patriots of the Atlantic League of Professional Baseball. In 20 appearances for the Patriots, Fisher compiled a 1.33 ERA with 28 strikeouts across 20 1/3 innings pitched.

=== Atlanta Braves ===
On June 21, 2014, Fisher's contract was purchased by the Atlanta Braves organization. The Braves assigned Fisher to the Triple-A Gwinnett Braves, where he spent the remainder of the season.

Fisher started the 2015 season with Gwinnett as well, accumulating a 2–4 record and 1.61 ERA with 58 strikeouts and six saves spanning 43 relief appearances. He elected free agency following the season on November 6, 2015.

=== Texas Rangers ===
On February 2, 2016, Fisher signed a minor league contract with the Texas Rangers organization. In 42 appearances out of the bullpen, he compiled a 5–7 record and 4.40 ERA with 63 strikeouts and 8 saves across 47 innings of work. Fisher elected free agency following the season on November 7.

=== San Diego Padres ===
On December 5, 2016, Fisher signed a minor league contract with the San Diego Padres. Fisher made 18 appearances for the Triple-A El Paso Chihuahuas in 2017, but struggled to an 0–3 record and 8.41 ERA with 20 strikeouts across 20 1/3 innings pitched.

=== Mexican League ===
On June 6, 2017, Fisher was loaned to the Toros de Tijuana of the Mexican League. On March 18, 2018, Fisher was traded to the Rieleros de Aguascalientes. On July 3, he was traded to the Acereros de Monclova. He became a free agent after the season.
