= Logan Ondrusek =

American baseball player (born 1985)

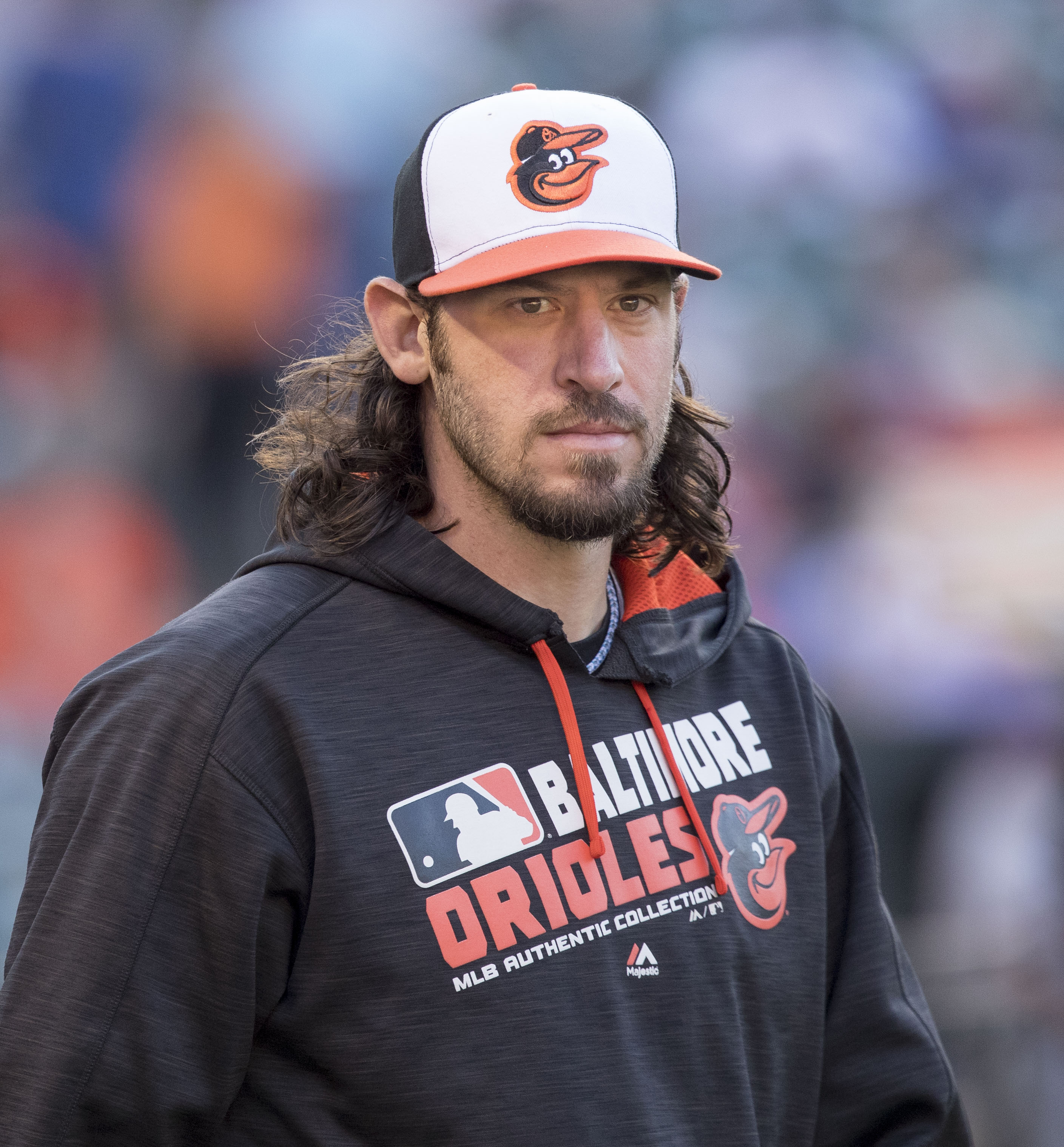
- Ondrusek with the Baltimore Orioles in 2016

Free agent
- Pitcher
- Born: February 13, 1985 (age 41); Hallettsville, Texas, U.S.
- Bats: Right Throws: Right

Professional debut
- MLB: April 5, 2010, for the Cincinnati Reds
- NPB: March 27, 2015, for the Tokyo Yakult Swallows
- CPBL: April 16, 2022, for the Uni-President Lions

MLB statistics (through 2016 season)
- Win–loss record: 21–11
- Earned run average: 4.03
- Strikeouts: 218

NPB statistics (through 2016 season)
- Win–loss record: 8–3
- Earned run average: 2.17
- Strikeouts: 91

CPBL statistics (through 2024 season)
- Win–loss record: 19–12
- Earned run average: 2.36
- Strikeouts: 238
- Stats at Baseball Reference

Teams
- Cincinnati Reds (2010–2014); Tokyo Yakult Swallows (2015–2016); Baltimore Orioles (2016); Uni-President Lions (2022–2024)

Logan Jared Ondrusek (born February 13, 1985) is an American professional baseball pitcher who is a free agent. He has previously played in Major League Baseball (MLB) for the Cincinnati Reds and Baltimore Orioles, in Nippon Professional Baseball (NPB) for the Tokyo Yakult Swallows, and in the Chinese Professional Baseball League (CPBL) for the Uni-President Lions. Ondrusek currently lives in Shiner, Texas.

== Professional career ==
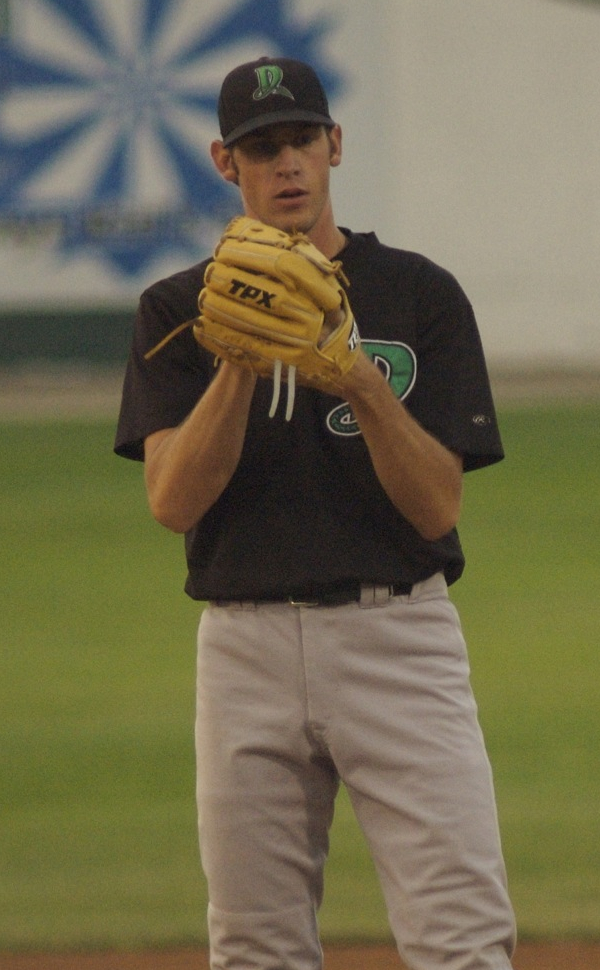
Ondrusek pitching for the Dayton Dragons, Single-A affiliates of the Cincinnati Reds, in 2006

=== Cincinnati Reds ===
The Cincinnati Reds selected Ondrusek in the 13th round of the 2005 MLB June Amateur Draft. Ondrusek began his minor league career with the rookie-level Billings Mustangs. In his first year with the Mustangs, he went 1–6 with a 6.02 ERA. In 2006, Ondrusek pitched for Billings, the Single-A Dayton Dragons, and Double-A Chattanooga Lookouts. In his second year, he went 4–6 with a 3.59 ERA. In 2008, Ondrusek was promoted to the Reds' Triple-A affiliate, the Louisville Bats, where he went 4–1 with a 1.50 ERA.

Ondrusek was added to the Reds' 40-man roster after the 2009 season to protect him from the Rule 5 Draft.

==== 2010 ====
In 2010, Ondrusek made the Reds' Opening Day roster with a strong showing in spring training, throwing 10 scoreless innings. He made his first professional appearance on Opening Day at Great American Ballpark, pitching a scoreless eighth inning against the St. Louis Cardinals. However, with an 11.12 ERA through nine appearances, Ondrusek was sent down to Triple-A Louisville on April 22. Due to injuries and struggles in the Reds' bullpen, Ondrusek was recalled to the majors on June 1. Despite a rough initial appearance upon his return to the big leagues (giving up a home run to Matt Holliday in his first game back), Ondrusek settled down, with a 1.27 ERA from his June 1 recall through August 10. This included a streak of 22 scoreless innings in 20 appearances.

Ondrusek earned the first win of his MLB career on July 23 against the Houston Astros after pitching a scoreless seventh inning. Ondrusek picked up four more wins over the rest of the season, finishing the 2010 regular season 5–0 with a 3.68 ERA and 39 strikeouts over 58 2/3 innings.

Ondrusek pitched in both Game 1 and Game 2 of the 2010 NLDS against the Philadelphia Phillies. In the first game, he pitched 1.2 innings, allowing no hits or runs despite committing a throwing error. In Game 2, Ondrusek was brought in with two outs and the bases loaded in the sixth inning, and allowed a run on a hit batsman. However, he got the next batter to ground out, escaping the jam with minimal damage. Ondrusek finished the 2010 postseason with a 0.00 ERA with no walks in two innings pitched in two games.

==== 2011 ====
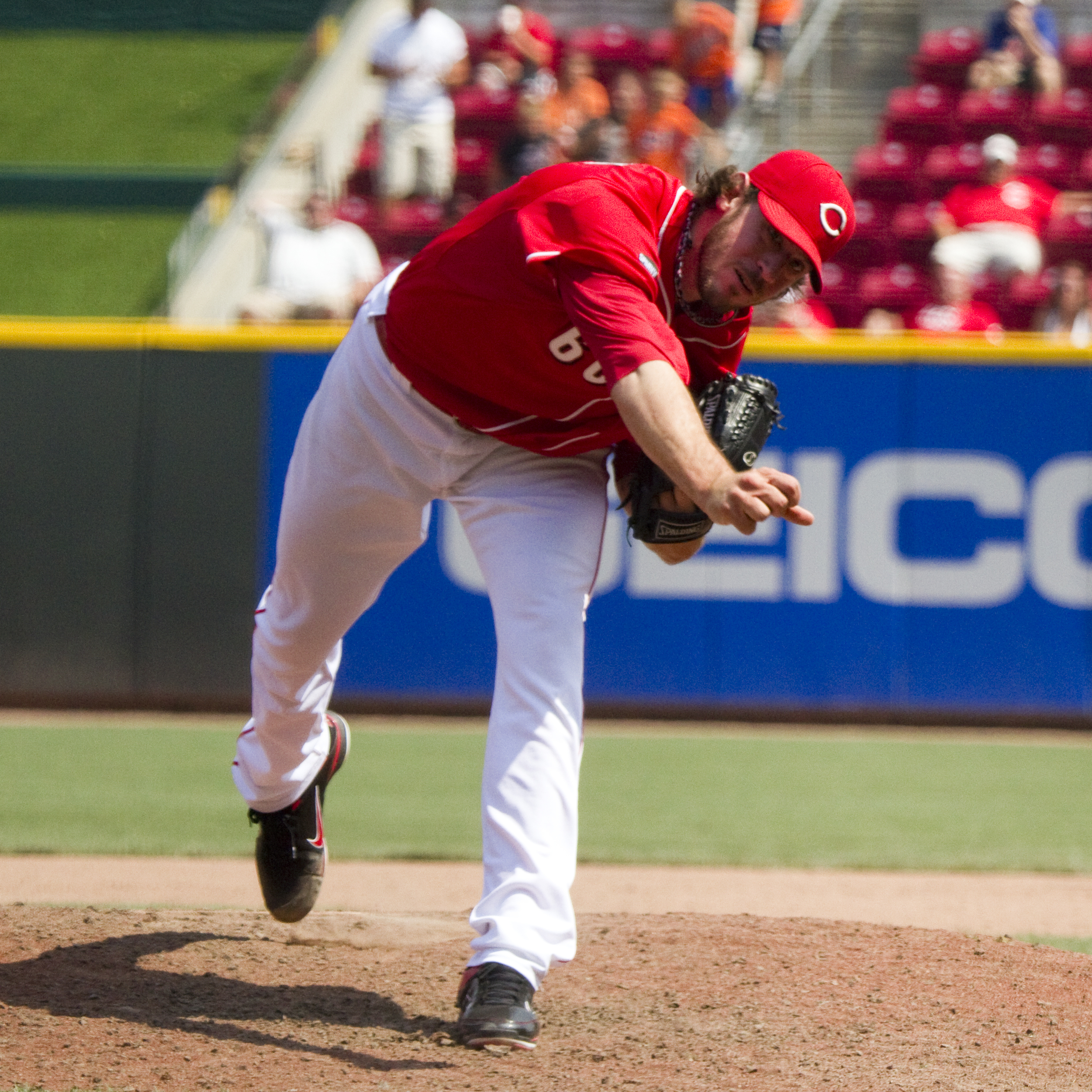
Ondrusek pitching for the Cincinnati Reds in 2011

Ondrusek played all of 2011 with Cincinnati, where in 66 appearances, he went 5–5 with a 3.23 ERA and 14 holds, striking out 41 in 61 1/3 innings. Ondrusek was used mostly in the seventh and eighth innings, usually to pitch one inning per game.

==== 2012 ====
Ondrusek played most of 2012 with Cincinnati, but was optioned to Louisville on August 21 when the Reds were in need of a catcher after Devin Mesoraco was suspended. He was brought back up when the rosters expanded in September. In 63 appearances in 2012, Ondrusek went 5–2 with a 3.46 ERA and 13 holds, striking out 39 in 54 2/3 innings. He was used mostly in the 8th inning, with 32 of his appearances coming in the 8th.

==== 2013 ====
On January 17, 2013, Ondrusek signed a two-year, $2.35 million contract to avoid arbitration. As a Super Two player, Ondrusek was granted four years of arbitration versus the normal three.

Ondrusek began 2013 with the Double-A Pensacola Blue Wahoos after a spring training in which he gave up nine runs in 10 2/3 innings with a WHIP of 2.062. He made three appearances with the Blue Wahoos before being recalled to Cincinnati. Ondrusek was optioned to Louisville on June 8, after an outing in which he gave up four runs. He had a 5.64 ERA and a 1.299 WHIP in 21 appearances at the time. Ondrusek returned on June 29 after Johnny Cueto went on the disabled list. Ondrusek finished the year in the Reds' bullpen. In 52 appearances with Cincinnati, he was 3–1 with a 4.09 ERA, striking out 53 in 55 innings.

==== 2014 ====
Ondrusek was placed on the disabled list on July 23, 2014, with right shoulder soreness. At the time, he had a 3–2 record and a 4.31 ERA in 29 appearances out of the Reds' bullpen. He was activated from the disabled list on August 18. On December 2, the Reds non-tendered Ondrusek, making him a free agent.

=== Tokyo Yakult Swallows ===
==== 2015 ====
On December 29, 2014, Ondrusek signed a one-year deal with the Tokyo Yakult Swallows of the Nippon Professional Baseball. In his first season, Ondrusek posted an ERA of 2.05 in 72 games. He re-signed for the 2016 season and was named their closer. Ondrusek was suspended by the Swallows for an incident with the team's coaches in a June 26 game and was later released by the club. In his two seasons with the Swallows, he pitched in 102 games, posting an 8–3 record with 11 saves and a 2.17 ERA.

=== Baltimore Orioles ===
On July 29, 2016, Ondrusek signed a major league contract with the Baltimore Orioles, who designated relief pitcher Chaz Roe for assignment to clear roster space. In 7 appearances for Baltimore, he struggled to a 9.95 ERA with 4 strikeouts across 6 1/3 innings pitched. On August 26, Ondrusek was designated for assignment by the Orioles. He cleared waivers and was sent outright to the Triple-A Norfolk Tides on August 31. On November 4, Baltimore declined Ondrusek's option for the 2017 season, making him a free agent.

On December 13, 2016, the Orioles re-signed Ondrusek to a one-year, $625,000 contract. After battling elbow soreness during spring training, he was released prior to the start of the season on March 17, 2017.

=== Los Angeles Dodgers ===
On March 27, 2018, Ondrusek signed a minor league contract with the Los Angeles Dodgers. In 16 appearances split between the Double-A Tulsa Drillers and Triple-A Oklahoma City Dodgers, he accumulated a 4.50 ERA with 24 strikeouts across 22 innings pitched. Ondrusek was released by the Dodgers organization on July 17.

=== Long Island Ducks ===
On July 25, 2018, Ondrusek signed with the Long Island Ducks of the Atlantic League of Professional Baseball. In 20 appearances for the Ducks, he posted a 2–1 record and 1.27 ERA with 28 strikeouts across 21 1/3 innings pitched. Ondrusek became a free agent following the season.

=== Washington Nationals ===
On February 6, 2019, Ondrusek signed a minor league contract with the Washington Nationals. In 22 appearances (15 starts) split between the Double–A Harrisburg Senators and Triple–A Fresno Grizzlies, he accumulated a 4–6 record and 6.80 ERA with 71 strikeouts across 83 1/3 innings pitched. Ondrusek became a free agent following the season on November 4.

=== Leones de Yucatán ===
On December 14, 2019, Ondrusek signed with the Leones de Yucatán of the Mexican League. Ondrusek did not play in a game in 2020 due to the cancellation of the Mexican League season because of the COVID-19 pandemic. On February 19, 2021, Ondrusek re-signed with the Leones.

=== San Francisco Giants ===
On August 7, 2021, Ondrusek signed a minor league deal with the San Francisco Giants organization.

=== Uni-President Lions ===
On January 14, 2022, Ondrusek signed with the Uni-President Lions of the Chinese Professional Baseball League. In 14 starts for the team, he posted a 9–1 record and 1.87 ERA with 84 strikeouts across 82 innings of work.

Ondrusek made 14 appearances (13 starts) for the Lions during the 2023 campaign, registering a 4–5 record and 2.35 ERA with 73 strikeouts across 84 1/3 innings pitched. On August 31, 2023, Ondrusek re-signed with the Lions.

Ondrusek made 18 appearances (17 starts) for the Lions in 2024, compiling a 6–6 record and 2.77 ERA with 81 strikeouts across 104 innings pitched. He became a free agent following the season.

=== Leones de Yucatán (second stint) ===
On March 26, 2025, Ondrusek signed with the Leones de Yucatán of the Mexican League. In nine starts for Yucatán, he struggled to a 1–3 record and 7.62 ERA with 31 strikeouts across 41 1/3 innings pitched. Ondrusek was released by the Leones on June 14.

== Pitching style ==
Ondrusek mostly uses three pitches: a four-seam fastball averaging about 92–93 mph, a slider around 80 mph, and a cutter in the low 90s. He also has a sinker and a changeup, which is used primarily against lefties. He throws with a straight-over-the-top motion.
