= Devin Mesoraco =

American baseball player and coach (born 1988)

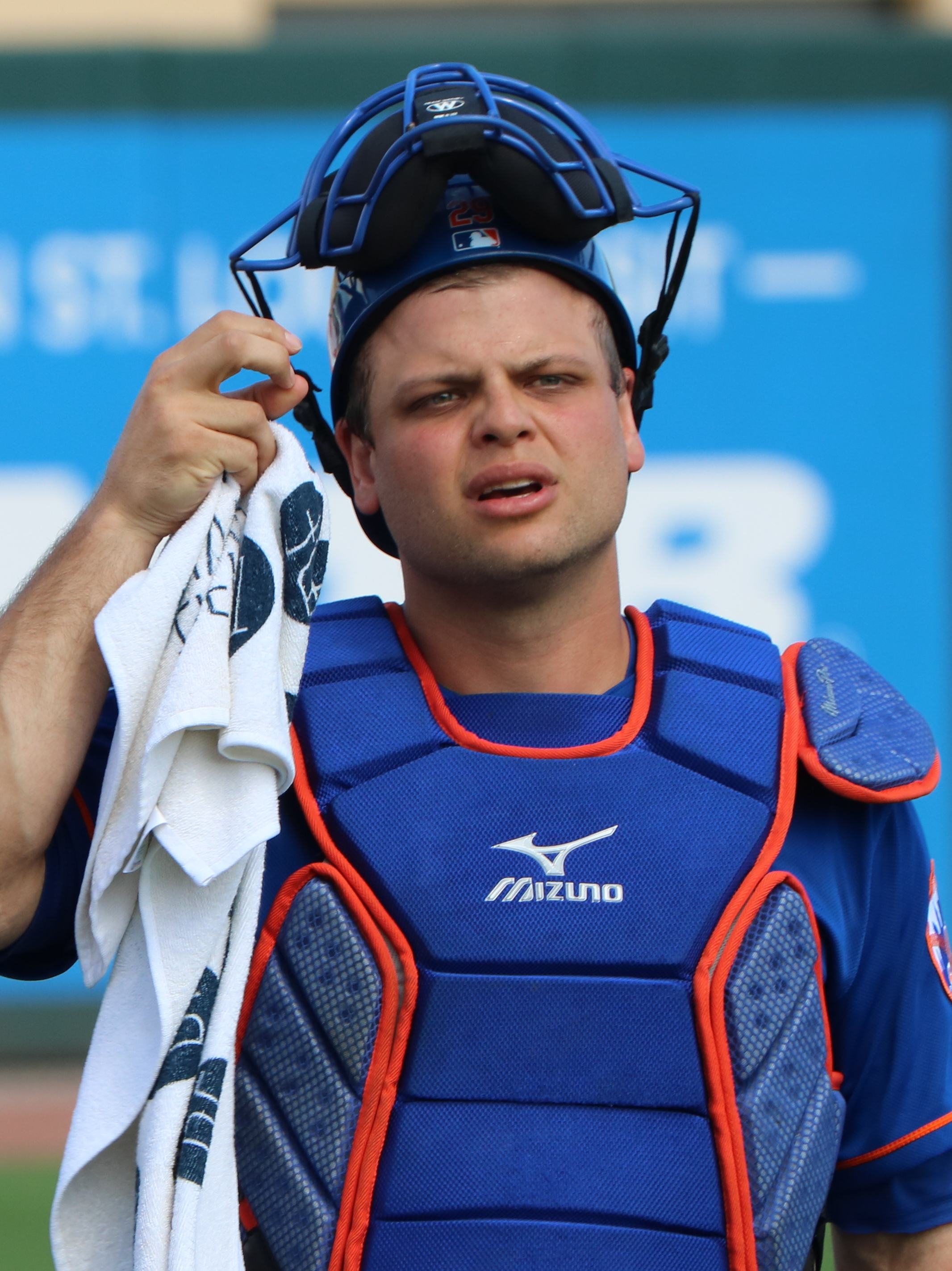
- Mesoraco with the Mets in 2019
- Catcher
- Born: June 19, 1988 (age 38); Punxsutawney, Pennsylvania, U.S.
- Batted: Right Threw: Right

MLB debut
- September 3, 2011, for the Cincinnati Reds

Last MLB appearance
- September 29, 2018, for the New York Mets

MLB statistics
- Batting average: .232
- Home runs: 58
- Runs batted in: 192
- Stats at Baseball Reference

Teams
- Cincinnati Reds (2011–2018); New York Mets (2018)

Career highlights and awards
- All-Star (2014)

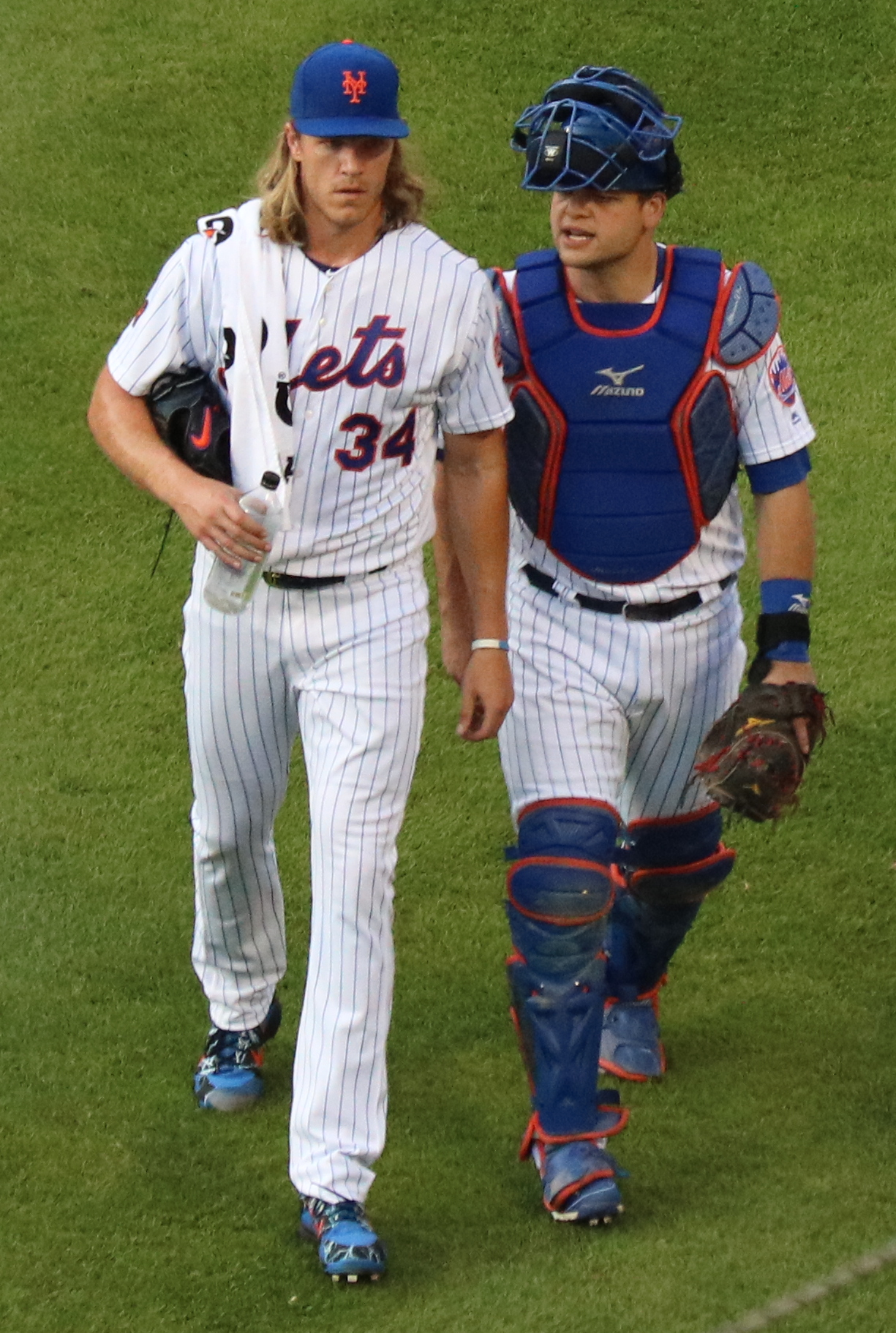
Mesoraco with Noah Syndergaard in 2018

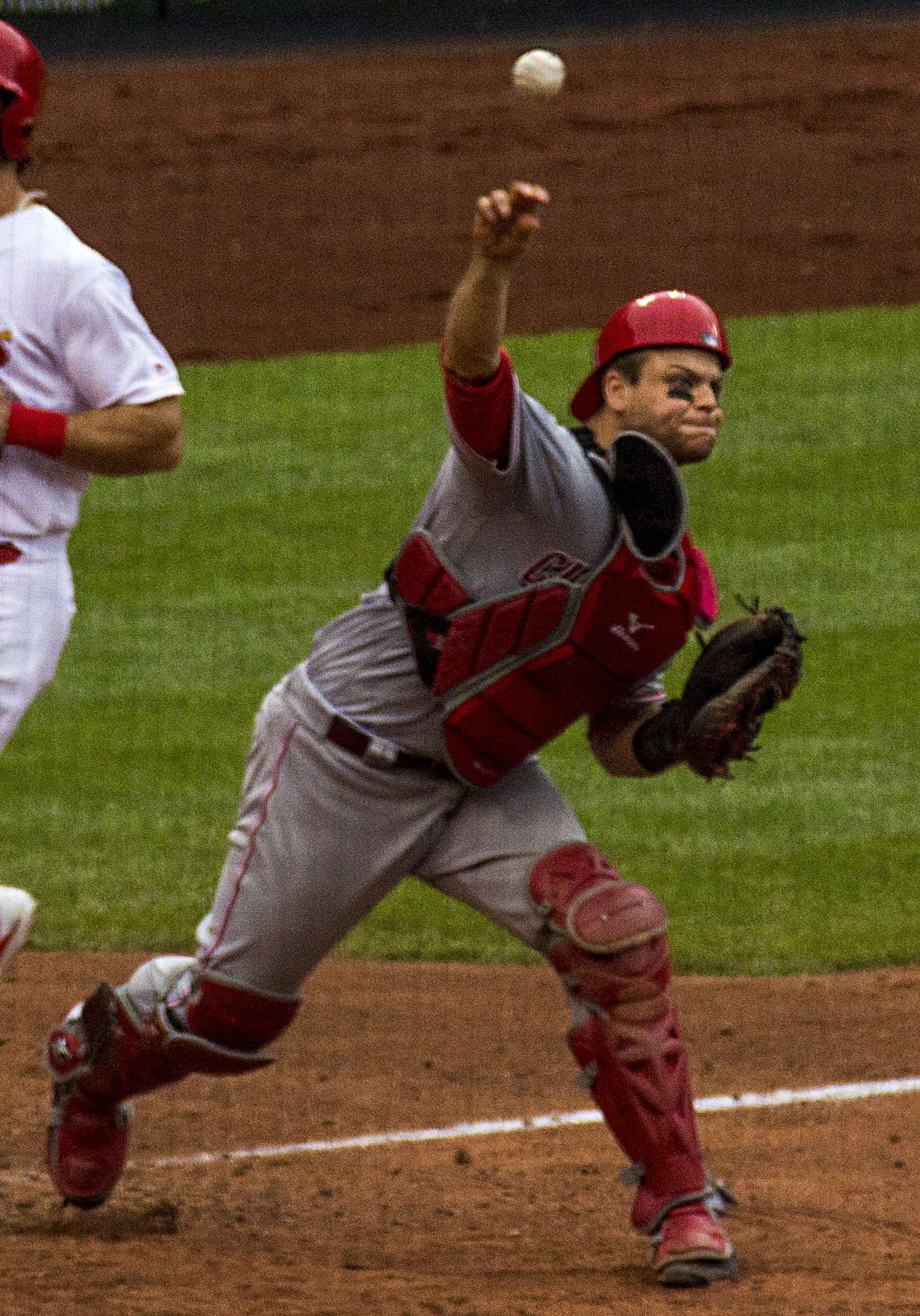
Mesoraco fields a bunt in St. Louis in 2017.

Devin Douglas Mesoraco (born June 19, 1988) is an American baseball coach and former professional baseball catcher, who is the current general manager and director of player development for the Pittsburgh Panthers. He has played in Major League Baseball (MLB) for the Cincinnati Reds and New York Mets. Mesoraco was an MLB All-Star in 2014, but saw his career derailed due to multiple injuries.

== Early life ==
Mesoraco was born on June 19, 1988, in Punxsutawney, Pennsylvania, the son of Laura and Doug Mesoraco.

Mesoraco attended Punxsutawney Area High School in Punxsutawney, Pennsylvania, where he was a catcher for the Chucks baseball team. He set school records in walks, runs, hits, doubles, home runs, and stolen bases. Before his senior year, he committed to play college baseball at the University of Virginia. He was named the 2007 Pennsylvania Gatorade Player of the Year. In that same year, he helped the Chucks win the PIAA Class AAA State Championship played at Peoples Natural Gas Field, home of the Altoona Curve.

== Professional career ==
=== Minor leagues ===
Mesoraco was drafted by the Cincinnati Reds with the 15th overall pick of the 2007 Major League Baseball draft. Mesoraco is widely known among Reds fans as "The Groundhog" from Punxsutawney. He is only the third catcher to be taken by the Reds with their first pick. He played 40 games for the rookie-class Gulf Coast League Reds, hitting .219 in 137 at-bats.

He spent 2008 with the single-A Dayton Dragons. Mesoraco hit .261 with nine home runs and 42 runs batted in during 306 at-bats. He hit a grand slam on July 10 and had a two-homer game on July 21. He also had a four-hit game on August 15.

Mesoraco was invited to big league camp in 2009. However, 2009 was a low point in his career statistically. He hit .228 with eight home runs and 37 runs batted in over 312 at-bats for the single-A advanced Sarasota Reds.

Mesoraco started 2010 with the single-A advanced Lynchburg Hillcats. He hit .355 in 43 games before being promoted to double-A Carolina. He hit .294 in 56 games for the Mudcats, and was again promoted, this time to the triple-A Louisville Bats. He was 12-for-52 in 14 games for the Bats. Mesoraco finished the season with a combined 25 doubles, 26 home runs, and 75 runs batted in. He earned a trip to the Arizona Fall League, where he hit .242 with two homers and 11 runs batted in.

Many thought Mesoraco would be added to the 40-man roster following the 2010 season, but the Reds re-signed Ramón Hernández and Mesoraco was left off.

Prior to the 2012 season, Mesoraco was ranked as the top prospect in the Reds organization according to Baseball America. That same year, he was also ranked by Jonathan Mayo of MLB.com as the 14th best prospect in baseball.

He was added to the 40-man roster, played in the 2011 Futures Game, and brought up as a September call-up for the Reds in 2011.

=== Cincinnati Reds ===
Mesoraco made his major league debut on September 3, 2011. He appeared in 18 games for the rest of 2011 with a .180 batting average, 2 home runs, and 6 runs batted in.

On July 30, 2012, Mesoraco was ejected from a game against the San Diego Padres for arguing with umpire Chad Fairchild. Mesoraco then proceeded to bump the umpire. He returned to the lineup the next night but left during the game due to dizziness from being overheated. He was placed on the 7-day disabled list due to a concussion the next day. Mesoraco also received a three-game suspension, which was reduced to two games upon appeal. He played in 54 games of 2012 batting .212 with 5 home runs and 14 runs batted in. In 2013, Mesoraco gained a little more playing time as he played in 103 games batting .238 with 9 home runs and 42 runs batted in.

Landing on the disabled list twice in the early part of the 2014 season, as of June 4 Mesoraco was batting .294 but had yet to amass a sufficient number of at-bats to be listed among Major League Baseball's leaders in the category. Mesoraco was named to play for the National League in the 2014 MLB All-Star Game. He finished the season with 25 home runs and 80 runs batted in, playing in 114 games, leading all major league catchers in home runs and slugging percentage.

On January 26, 2015, the Cincinnati Reds and Mesoraco agreed to a four-year contract extension worth $28 million. Later on June 20, Mesoraco announced that he would undergo left hip surgery, causing him to miss the rest of the 2015 season. Limited to 23 games in 2015, Mesoraco batted .178 with 2 runs batted in.

Mesoraco again had a short-lived season in 2016 as he played only 16 games with 1 run batted in and a .140 average. On May 6, 2016, Mesoraco opted to have surgery on his left shoulder that was diagnosed with a torn labrum, causing him to miss the rest of the 2016 season.

In August 2017 against the Chicago Cubs, Mesoraco was hit by a pitch on his left foot from Cubs' starter Jose Quintana, causing him to miss the rest of the season. He played 56 games and batted .213.

=== New York Mets ===
On May 8, 2018, the Reds traded Mesoraco with cash considerations to the New York Mets for Matt Harvey. He became a free agent after the season. He re-signed on February 7, 2019, to a minor league deal.

On March 25, 2019, the New York Mets placed Mesoraco on their restricted list after he failed to make their Opening Day roster and he refused to report to his minor league assignment. Mesoraco's agent, B.B. Abbott, later stated Mesoraco will retire instead of report to Syracuse.

== Coaching career ==
On July 10, 2020, Mesoraco joined the University of Pittsburgh coaching staff as a volunteer assistant, working primarily with the catchers, officially ending his playing career. Prior to the 2025 season, Mesoraco was promoted to general manager and director of player development for the Panthers.

== Personal life ==
Mesoraco married his longtime fiancée, Kira, on November 15, 2014, at Ss. Cosmas & Damian church in Punxsutawney. They welcomed their first child, a son, in August 2017. They reside in Pittsburgh, where Mesoraco is a volunteer coach for the Pittsburgh Panthers baseball team.
