= 2010 Arizona Diamondbacks season =

2010 Arizona Diamondbacks
- League: National League
- Division: West
- Ballpark: Chase Field
- City: Phoenix, Arizona
- Record: 65–97 (.401)
- Divisional place: 5th
- Owners: Ken Kendrick
- General managers: Josh Byrnes, Kevin Towers
- Managers: A. J. Hinch through July 1 Kirk Gibson (interim) after July 1
- Television: FS Arizona (Daron Sutton, Greg Schulte, Mark Grace, Luis Gonzalez, Joe Garagiola)
- Radio: KTAR (620 AM) (Greg Schulte, Jeff Munn, Tom Candiotti); KSUN (Spanish)

The Arizona Diamondbacks' 2010 season, the franchise's 13th season in Major League Baseball, included the team's attempt to make the playoffs for the first time since 2007. On July 1, 2010, the Arizona Diamondbacks fired Manager A. J. Hinch following a 31–48 start to the 2010 season and promoted Kirk Gibson who had served as the bench coach of the team since the 2007 season. Along with the dismissal of Hinch came the firing of General Manager Josh Byrnes.

== Edwin Jackson no-hitter ==
On June 25, 2010, in a game against the Tampa Bay Rays at Tropicana Field in St. Petersburg, Florida, Diamondbacks right-hander Edwin Jackson threw the second no-hitter in franchise history in a 1–0 victory in front of a crowd of 18,918. Jackson walked eight Rays batters and struck out six in a 149 pitch outing to complete the game, the only offense he received by his teammates came in the form of a solo home run by first baseman Adam LaRoche in the second inning.

== Regular season ==
=== Season standings ===
==== National League West ====
NL West
Team	W	L	Pct.	GB	Home	Road
San Francisco Giants	92	70	.568	—	49‍–‍32	43‍–‍38
San Diego Padres	90	72	.556	2	45‍–‍36	45‍–‍36
Colorado Rockies	83	79	.512	9	52‍–‍29	31‍–‍50
Los Angeles Dodgers	80	82	.494	12	45‍–‍36	35‍–‍46
Arizona Diamondbacks	65	97	.401	27	40‍–‍41	25‍–‍56

==== National League Wild Card ====
Division leaders
Team	W	L	Pct.
Philadelphia Phillies	97	65	.599
San Francisco Giants	92	70	.568
Cincinnati Reds	91	71	.562

Wild Card team (Top team qualifies for postseason)
Team	W	L	Pct.	GB
Atlanta Braves	91	71	.562	—
San Diego Padres	90	72	.556	1
St. Louis Cardinals	86	76	.531	5
Colorado Rockies	83	79	.512	8
Florida Marlins	80	82	.494	11
Los Angeles Dodgers	80	82	.494	11
New York Mets	79	83	.488	12
Milwaukee Brewers	77	85	.475	14
Houston Astros	76	86	.469	15
Chicago Cubs	75	87	.463	16
Washington Nationals	69	93	.426	22
Arizona Diamondbacks	65	97	.401	26
Pittsburgh Pirates	57	105	.352	34

==== Record vs. opponents ====
2010 National League record Source: MLB Standings Grid – 2010
Team	AZ	ATL	CHC	CIN	COL	FLA	HOU	LAD	MIL	NYM	PHI	PIT	SD	SF	STL	WSH	AL
Arizona	–	3–4	1–6	2–5	9–9	3–3	4–3	5–13	3–4	5–1	2–4	2–4	8–10	5–13	4–5	3–4	6–9
Atlanta	4–3	–	4–2	3–2	2–4	11–7	5–1	5–3	5–2	11–7	8–10	6–3	4–2	4–3	2–6	8–10	9–6
Chicago	6–1	2–4	–	4–12	2–3	4–2	7–11	3–4	9–6	3–4	4–2	5–10	3–5	2–5	9–6	4–2	8–10
Cincinnati	5–2	2–3	12–4	–	2–5	5–2	10–5	5–4	11–3	4–2	2–5	10–6	2–4	3–4	6–12	4–3	8–7
Colorado	9–9	4–2	3–2	5–2	–	3–4	2–4	7–11	5–4	3–3	1–6	3–4	12–6	9–9	3–4	5–3	9–6
Florida	3–3	7–11	2–4	2–5	4–3	–	3–3	4–2	4–4	12–6	5–13	6–2	3–6	2–5	3–2	13–5	7–8
Houston	3–4	1–5	11–7	5–10	4–2	3–3	–	2–4	8–7	3–4	4–3	11–4	2–5	2–7	10–5	4–4	3–12
Los Angeles	13–5	3–5	4–3	4–5	11–7	2–4	4–2	–	4–2	3–4	2–4	4–3	8–10	8–10	3–4	3–3	4–11
Milwaukee	4–3	2–5	6–9	3–11	4–5	4–4	7–8	2–4	–	5–2	1–5	13–5	3–4	2–5	8–7	4–2	9–6
New York	1–5	7–11	4–3	2–4	3–3	6–12	4–3	4–3	2–5	–	9–9	6–1	3–3	3–4	3–3	9–9	13–5
Philadelphia	4–2	10–8	2–4	5–2	6–1	13–5	3–4	4–2	5–1	9–9	–	2–4	5–2	3–3	4–4	12–6	10–8
Pittsburgh	4–2	3–6	10–5	6–10	4–3	2–6	4–11	3–4	5–13	1–6	4–2	–	0–6	2–4	6–9	1–5	2–13
San Diego	10–8	2–4	5–3	4–2	6–12	6–3	5–2	10–8	4–3	3–3	2–5	6–0	–	12–6	3–4	3–3	9–6
San Francisco	13–5	3–4	5–2	4–3	9–9	5–2	7–2	10–8	5–2	4–3	3–3	4–2	6–12	–	3–3	4–2	7–8
St. Louis	5–4	6–2	6–9	12–6	4–3	2–3	5–10	4–3	7–8	3–3	4–4	9–6	4–3	3–3	–	3–3	9–6
Washington	4–3	10–8	2–4	3–4	3–5	5–13	4–4	3–3	2–4	9–9	6–12	5–1	3–3	2–4	3–3	–	5–13

=== Game log ===
Legend
Diamondbacks Win	Diamondbacks Loss	Game postponed

2010 Game Log (65–97)
April (11–12)

#	Date	Opponent	Score	Win	Loss	Save	Attendance	Record
1	April 5	San Diego	6–3	Haren (1–0)	Garland (0–1)	None	49,192	1–0
2	April 6	San Diego	3–6	Young (1–0)	Jackson (0–1)	Bell (1)	19,177	1–1
3	April 7	San Diego	5–3	Boyer (1–0)	Correia (0–1)	Qualls (1)	17,673	2–1
4	April 9	Pittsburgh	9–1	López (1–0)	Morton (0–1)	None	21,316	3–1
5	April 10	Pittsburgh	3–6	Duke (2–0)	Haren (1–1)	Dotel (1)	22,400	3–2
6	April 11	Pittsburgh	15–6	Jackson (1–1)	McCutchen (0–1)	None	21,093	4–2
7	April 13	@ Los Angeles	9–5	Kershaw (1–0)	Kennedy (0–1)	None	56,000	4–3
8	April 14	@ Los Angeles	7–9	Rosales (1–0)	Ortiz (0–1)	None	44,621	5–3
9	April 15	@ Los Angeles	6–5	Broxton (1–0)	Boyer (1–1)	None	39,697	5–4
10	April 16	@ San Diego	6–3	Bell (1–0)	Gutiérrez (0–1)	None	26,632	5–5
11	April 17	@ San Diego	5–0	Correia (2–1)	Benson (0–1)	None	31,324	5–6
12	April 18	@ San Diego	5–3	Mujica (1–0)	Heilman (0–1)	Bell (3)	20,634	5–7
13	April 19	St. Louis	2–4	Penny (2–0)	Boyer (1–2)	Franklin (5)	24,167	5–8
14	April 20	St. Louis	9–7	Haren (2–1)	Boggs (0–1)	Qualls (2)	19,855	6–8
15	April 21	St. Louis	4–9	Motte (1–1)	Qualls (0–1)	None	19,165	6–9
16	April 23	Philadelphia	7–4	Benson (1–1)	Hamels (2–2)	Qualls (3)	25,980	7–9
17	April 24	Philadelphia	2–3	Contreras (1–1)	Gutiérrez (0–2)	Madson (4)	33,323	7–10
18	April 25	Philadelphia	8–6	Rosales (2–0)	Herndon (0–1)	Qualls (4)	29,296	8–10
19	April 26	@ Colorado	3–5	Haren (3–1)	Hammel (0–2)	Qualls (5)	20,308	9–10
20	April 27	@ Colorado	12–1	Jiménez (5–0)	Jackson (1–2)	None	24,112	9–11
21	April 28	@ Colorado	11–12	Howry (1–0)	Morales (0–2)	Gutiérrez (1)	23,773	10–11
22	April 29	@ Chicago	5–13	Kennedy (1–1)	Lilly (1–1)	None	36,850	11–11
23	April 30	@ Chicago	11–5	Wells (3–0)	López (1–1)	None	37,800	11–12

May (9–20)

#	Date	Opponent	Score	Win	Loss	Save	Attendance	Record
24	May 1	@ Chicago	7–5	Marshall (1–1)	Gutiérrez (0–3)	Mármol (4)	40,368	11–13
25	May 2	@ Chicago	10–5	Gorzelanny (1–3)	Jackson (1–3)	None	38,144	11–14
26	May 3	@ Houston	1–9	Valdez (1–0)	Paulino (0–4)	None	20,370	12–14
27	May 4	@ Houston	0–1	Kennedy (2–1)	Oswalt (2–4)	Qualls (5)	22,661	13–14
28	May 5	@ Houston	4–2	Lindstrom (1–0)	Gutiérrez (0–4)	None	21,030	13–15
29	May 6	@ Houston	3–6	Haren (4–1)	Rodríguez (1–4)	None	21,019	14–15
30	May 7	Milwaukee	2–3	Gallardo (4–2)	Jackson (1–4)	Hoffman (5)	27,067	14–16
31	May 8	Milwaukee	3–17	Wolf (3–2)	Valdez (1–1)	None	26,877	14–17
32	May 9	Milwaukee	1–6	Narveson (3–0)	Kennedy (2–2)	None	25,358	14–18
33	May 10	Los Angeles	3–7	Billingsley (3–2)	López (1–2)	None	19,863	14–19
34	May 11	Los Angeles	3–13	Ely (1–1)	Haren (4–2)	None	21,030	14–20
35	May 12	Los Angeles	3–6	Kuroda (4–1)	Jackson (1–5)	Broxton (4)	22,714	14–21
36	May 14	@ Atlanta	6–5	Wagner (2–0)	Qualls (0–2)	None	30,657	14–22
37	May 15	@ Atlanta	1–11	López (2–2)	Hanson (3–3)	None	32,718	15–22
38	May 16	@ Atlanta	13–1	Hudson (4–1)	Haren (4–3)	None	31,758	15–23
39	May 17	@ Florida	1–5	Jackson (2–5)	Volstad (3–4)	None	10,870	16–23
40	May 18	@ Florida	8–0	Johnson (4–1)	Buckner (0–1)	None	13,289	16–24
41	May 19	San Francisco	13–1	Kennedy (3–2)	Wellemeyer (3–3)	None	17,073	17–24
42	May 20	San Francisco	8–7	Heilman (1–1)	Affeldt (2–3)	Qualls (7)	18,607	18–24
43	May 21	Toronto	8–6	Haren (5–3)	Morrow (3–4)	Qualls (8)	19,531	19–24
44	May 22	Toronto	8–5	Jackson (3–5)	Eveland (3–4)	Qualls (9)	32,746	20–24
45	May 23	Toronto	4–12	Marcum (4–1)	Buckner (0–2)	None	23,148	20–25
46	May 25	@ Colorado	3–2	Chacín (3–2)	Kennedy (3–3)	Corpas (4)	28,370	20–26
47	May 26	@ Colorado	7–3	Jiménez (9–1)	López (2–3)	None	26,320	20–27
48	May 27	@ Colorado	8–2	Hammel (2–3)	Haren (5–4)	None	28,353	20–28
49	May 28	@ San Francisco	5–0	Cain (3–4)	Jackson (3–6)	None	31,495	20–29
50	May 29	@ San Francisco	12–1	Sánchez (3–4)	Buckner (0–3)	None	37,400	20–30
51	May 30	@ San Francisco	6–5	Wilson (1–0)	Rosa (0–1)	None	41,394	20–31
52	May 31	@ Los Angeles	5–4	Broxton (3–0)	Vásquez (0–1)	None	45,325	20–32

June (11–16)

#	Date	Opponent	Score	Win	Loss	Save	Attendance	Record
53	June 1	@ Los Angeles	1–0	Weaver (3–1)	Gutiérrez (0–5)	None	36,533	20–33
54	June 2	@ Los Angeles	1–0	Schlichting (1–0)	Valdez (1–2)	None	35,355	20–34
55	June 4	Colorado	7–6	Qualls (1–2)	Corpas (1–3)	None	25,290	21–34
56	June 5	Colorado	4–3	Willis (2–2)	Chacín (3–4)	Qualls (10)	28,138	22–34
57	June 6	Colorado	3–2	Jiménez (11–1)	López (2–4)	Corpas (6)	20,793	22–35
58	June 7	Atlanta	7–4	Haren (6–4)	Lowe (8–5)	Qualls (11)	17,731	23–35
59	June 8	Atlanta	5–7	Venters (1–0)	Vásquez (0–2)	Wagner (10)	17,052	23–36
60	June 9	Atlanta	2–1	Heilman (2–1)	Moylan (2–1)	Qualls (12)	19,138	24–36
61	June 10	Atlanta	7–11	Moylan (2–2)	Qualls (1–3)	Wagner (11)	26,969	24–37
62	June 11	St. Louis	2–5	García (6–2)	López (2–5)	Franklin (11)	20,629	24–38
63	June 12	St. Louis	7–2	Haren (7–4)	Ottavino (0–2)	None	30,017	25–38
64	June 13	St. Louis	7–5	Vásquez (1–2)	McClellan (0–2)	None	23,922	26–38
65	June 15	@ Boston	6–3	Buchholz (9–4)	Kennedy (3–4)	Papelbon (14)	37,459	26–39
66	June 16	@ Boston	6–2	Lester (8–2)	López (2–6)	Papelbon (15)	37,452	26–40
67	June 17	@ Boston	8–5	Lackey (8–3)	Haren (7–5)	None	37,544	26–41
68	June 18	@ Detroit	7–5	Coke (5–0)	Qualls (1–5)	Valverde (15)	37,438	26–42
69	June 19	@ Detroit	5–6	Jackson (4–6)	Porcello (4–7)	Heilman (1)	40,681	27–42
70	June 20	@ Detroit	3–1	Scherzer (4–6)	Kennedy (3–5)	Valverde (16)	41,417	27–43
71	June 21	Yankees	10–4	López (3–6)	Burnett (6–6)	None	47,229	28–43
72	June 22	Yankees	3–9	Pettitte (9–2)	Haren (7–6)	None	45,776	28–44
73	June 23	Yankees	5–6	Rivera (1–1)	Rosa (0–2)	None	46,325	28–45
74	June 25	@ Tampa Bay	0–1	Jackson (5–6) No-Hitter	Niemann (6–2)	None	18,918	29–45
75	June 26	@ Tampa Bay	5–3	Price (11–3)	Kennedy (3–6)	Soriano (18)	23,945	29–46
76	June 27	@ Tampa Bay	1–2	López (4–6)	Davis (5–9)	Heilman (2)	25,442	30–46
77	June 28	@ St. Louis	6–5	Motte (3–2)	Heilman (2–2)	None	41,578	30–47
78	June 29	@ St. Louis	8–0	Wainwright (11–5)	Willis (2–3)	None	38,736	30–48
79	June 30	@ St. Louis	2–4	Enright (1–0)	Suppan (0–4)	Heilman (3)	36,962	31–48

July (7–18)

#	Date	Opponent	Score	Win	Loss	Save	Attendance	Record
80	July 2	Los Angeles	12–5	Jackson (6–6)	Kuroda (7–6)	None	23,115	32–48
81	July 3	Los Angeles	1–14	Kershaw (8–4)	López (4–7)	None	44,169	32–49
82	July 4	Los Angeles	1–3	Kuo (3–1)	Heilman (2–3)	Broxton (17)	26,517	32–50
83	July 5	Chicago	4–9	Gorzelanny (3–5)	Kennedy (3–7)	None	26,250	32–51
84	July 6	Chicago	4–6	Silva (9–2)	Enright (1–1)	Mármol (16)	20,067	32–52
85	July 7	Chicago	3–8	Dempster (7–7)	Jackson (6–7)	None	20,914	32–53
86	July 8	Florida	10–4	López (5–7)	Sánchez (7–6)	None	16,664	33–53
87	July 9	Florida	2–3	Nolasco (9–6)	Haren (7–7)	Núñez (19)	18,117	33–54
88	July 10	Florida	5–4	Kennedy (4–7)	Robertson (6–7)	Gutiérrez (2)	21,627	34–54
89	July 11	Florida	0–2	Badenhop (1–5)	Enright (1–2)	Núñez (20)	21,037	34–55
90	July 16	@ San Diego	12–1	Garland (9–6)	Haren (7–8)	None	33,177	34–56
91	July 17	@ San Diego	8–5	Richard (7–4)	López (5–8)	Bell (25)	40,011	34–57
92	July 18	@ San Diego	6–4	Correia (6–6)	Jackson (6–8)	Bell (26)	25,363	34–58
93	July 19	Mets	13–2	Kennedy (5–7)	Pelfrey (10–5)	None	18,253	35–58
94	July 20	Mets	3–2	Enright (2–2)	Dickey (6–4)	Gutiérrez (3)	18,749	36–58
95	July 21	Mets	4–3	Boyer (2–2)	Nieve (0–0)	None	18,223	37–58
96	July 22	San Francisco	0–3	Cain (8–8)	López (5–9)	Wilson (27)	17,230	37–59
97	July 23	San Francisco	4–7	Ray (3–0)	Jackson (6–9)	Wilson (28)	22,512	37–60
98	July 24	San Francisco	4–10	Bumgarner (4–2)	Kennedy (5–8)	None	32,774	37–61
99	July 25	San Francisco	2–3	Romo (3–3)	Vásquez (1–3)	Wilson (29)	31,278	37–62
100	July 27	@ Philadelphia	9–5	Herndon (1–2)	Norberto (0–2)	None	44,379	37–63
101	July 28	@ Philadelphia	7–1	Halladay (12–8)	Jackson (6–10)	None	45,048	37–64
102	July 29	@ Philadelphia	3–2	Contreras (5–3)	Vásquez (1–4)	None	45,232	37–65
103	July 30	@ Mets	6–9	Kennedy (6–8)	Valdés (2–3)	Heilman (4)	34,280	38–65
104	July 31	@ Mets	5–4	Rodríguez (4–2)	Gutiérrez 0–6	None	35,287	38–66

August (16–13)

#	Date	Opponent	Score	Win	Loss	Save	Attendance	Record
105	August 1	@ Mets	1–14	Hudson (2–1)	Niese (7–5)	None	35,014	39–66
106	August 2	Washington	1–3	Hernández (8–7)	López (5–10)	Burnett (1)	16,793	39–67
107	August 3	Washington	6–1	Saunders (7–10)	Olsen (3–3)	None	17,164	40–67
108	August 4	Washington	2–7	Stammen (4–4)	Kennedy (6–9)	None	15,670	40–68
109	August 5	Washington	8–4	Enright (3–2)	Detwiler (0–2)	None	16,638	41–68
110	August 6	San Diego	2–1	Hudson (3–1)	Garland (10–8)	Heilman (5)	22,168	42–68
111	August 7	San Diego	6–5	Heilman (3–3)	Gregerson (3–6)	None	48,946	43–68
112	August 8	San Diego	1–10	Latos (12–5)	Saunders (7–11)	None	27,856	43–69
113	August 9	@ Milwaukee	4–7	Demel (1–0)	Hoffman (2–5)	Heilman (6)	29,633	44–69
114	August 10	@Milwaukee	1–2	Boyer (3–2)	Capuano (1–2)	Demel (1)	35,029	45–69
115	August 11	@ Milwaukee	2–8	Hudson (4–1)	Bush (5–10)	None	29,611	46–69
116	August 12	@ Milwaukee	8–4	Wolf (9–9)	López (5–11)	Axford (17)	34,808	46–70
117	August 13	@ Washington	4–2	Lannan (4–5)	Saunders (7–12)	Burnett (2)	19,549	46–71
118	August 14	@ Washington	2–9	Kennedy (7–9)	Marquis (0–5)	None	22,400	47–71
119	August 15	@ Washington	5–3	Clippard (9–6)	Norberto (0–2)	Storen (2)	21,695	47–72
120	August 17	Cincinnati	2–6	Arroyo (13–7)	Hudson (4–2)	None	21,502	47–73
121	August 18	Cincinnati	7–11	Rhodes (4–3)	Heilman (3–4)	None	15,509	47–74
122	August 19	Cincinnati	5–9	Wood (4–1)	Saunders (7–13)	None	17,385	47–75
123	August 20	Colorado	4–3	Heilman (4–4)	Beimel (1–2)	None	26,294	48–75
124	August 21	Colorado	3–1	Enright (3–2)	Jiménez (17–4)	Gutiérrez (4)	37,631	49–75
125	August 22	Colorado	0–1	Chacín (6–9)	Heilman (4–5)	Street (10)	30,397	49–76
126	August 24	@ San Diego	5–0	Richard (12–5)	López (5–12)	None	20,075	49–77
127	August 25	@ San Diego	9–3	LeBlanc (8–11)	Saunders (7–14)	None	21,966	49–78
128	August 26	@ San Diego	5–11	Kennedy (8–9)	Correia (10–9)	None	20,983	50–78
129	August 27	@ San Francisco	0–6	Enright (5–2)	Lincecum (10–9)	None	38,013	51–78
130	August 28	@ San Francisco	3–11	Hudson (5–2)	Zito (8–10)	None	41,250	52–78
131	August 29	@ San Francisco	9–7	Affeldt (3–3)	Vásquez (1–5)	Wilson (36)	38,735	52–79
132	August 30	San Diego	7–2	Saunders (8–14)	LeBlanc (8–12)	None	17,829	53–79
133	August 31	San Diego	7–4	Kennedy (9–9)	Correia (10–10)	Gutiérrez (5)	16,250	54–79

September (10–16)

#	Date	Opponent	Score	Win	Loss	Save	Attendance	Record
134	September 1	San Diego	5–2	Enright (6–2)	Gregerson (3–7)	Gutiérrez (6)	17,606	55–79
135	September 3	Houston	4–3	Heilman (5–5)	López (5–1)	Gutiérrez (7)	24,764	56–79
136	September 4	Houston	5–6	Melancon (2–0)	Heilman (5–6)	Lyon (12)	31,621	56–80
137	September 5	Houston	2–3	Happ (6–2)	López (5–13)	Lyon (13)	25,449	56–81
138	September 6	San Francisco	0–2	Casilla (6–2)	Heilman (5–7)	Wilson (41)	31,904	56–82
139	September 7	San Francisco	3–6	Lincecum (13–9)	Enright (6–3)	Affeldt (4)	19,423	56–83
140	September 8	San Francisco	3–1	Hudson (5–1)	Zito (8–12)	Gutiérrez (8)	19,971	57–83
141	September 10	@ Colorado	13–4	de la Rosa (7–4)	Saunders (2–5)	None	37,265	57–84
142	September 11	@ Colorado	2–1	Reynolds (1–0)	López (5–14)	Street (18)	48,023	57–85
143	September 12	@ Colorado	4–2	Street (3–4)	Demel (1–1)	None	41,504	57–86
144	September 13	@ Cincinnati	7–2	Arroyo (15–10)	Enright (6–4)	None	12,060	57–87
145	September 14	@ Cincinnati	1–3	Hudson (6–1)	Wood (5–3)	Gutiérrez (9)	16,973	58–87
146	September 15	@ Cincinnati	7–5	Maloney (1–2)	Saunders (2–6)	Cordero (36)	19,923	58–88
147	September 16	@ Cincinnati	1–3	López (6–14)	Vólquez (3–3)	Gutiérrez (10)	22,090	59–88
148	September 17	@ Pittsburgh	4–3	Meek (5–4)	Vásquez (1–6)	None	22,939	59–89
149	September 18	@ Pittsburgh	9–6	McDonald (4–5)	Enright (6–5)	None	25,981	59–90
150	September 19	@ Pittsburgh	4–3	Hanrahan (4–1)	Heilman (5–8)	Meek (3)	18,331	59–91
151	September 21	Colorado	3–1	Saunders (3–6)	de la Rosa (8–5)	Gutiérrez (11)	37,461	60–91
152	September 22	Colorado	8–4	López (7–14)	Jiménez (19–7)	Demel (2)	29,916	61–91
153	September 23	Colorado	10–9	Carrasco (3–2)	Francis (4–6)	Gutiérrez (12)	30,090	62–91
154	September 24	Los Angeles	1–3	Kershaw (13–10)	Enright (6–6)	Jansen (2)	38,567	62–92
155	September 25	Los Angeles	5–2	Hudson (7–1)	Ely (4–9)	Gutiérrez (13)	41,403	63–92
156	September 26	Los Angeles	5–4	Demel (2–1)	Broxton (5–6)	Gutiérrez (14)	38,178	64–92
157	September 28	@ San Francisco	4–2	Sánchez (12–9)	López (7–15)	Wilson (46)	37,449	64–93
158	September 29	@ San Francisco	3–1	Lincecum (16–10)	Kennedy (9–10)	Wilson (47)	38,228	64–94
159	September 30	@ San Francisco	4–1	Bumgarner (7–6)	Enright (6–7)	Ramírez (1)	37,261	64–95

October (1–2)

#	Date	Opponent	Score	Win	Loss	Save	Attendance	Record
160	October 1	@ Los Angeles	5–7	Kroenke (1–0)	Ely (4–10)	Gutiérrez (15)	36,713	65–95
161	October 2	@ Los Angeles	3–2	Billingsley (12–11)	Saunders (3–7)	Jansen (4)	41,918	65–96
162	October 3	@ Los Angeles	3–1	Lilly (10–12)	López (7–16)	Kuo (12)	38,007	65–97

=== Roster ===
2010 Arizona Diamondbacks
Roster
Pitchers: 48 Kris Benson; 55 Blaine Boyer; 33 Billy Buckner; 77 D. J. Carrasco; 38 Sam Demel; 54 Barry Enright; 58 Juan Gutiérrez; 21 Mike Hampton; 15 Dan Haren; 22 Aaron Heilman; 46 Bob Howry; 41 Daniel Hudson; 36 Edwin Jackson; 31 Ian Kennedy; 40 Zach Kroenke; 13 Rodrigo López; 57 Kevin Mulvey; 39 Jordan Norberto; 50 Chad Qualls; 56 Saúl Rivera; 59 Rafael Rodríguez; 49 Carlos Rosa; 47 Leo Rosales; 34 Joe Saunders; 52 Daniel Stange; 43 César Valdez; 32 Esmerling Vásquez; 35 Dontrelle Willis	Catchers: 28 John Hester; 26 Miguel Montero; 33 Konrad Schmidt; 19 Chris Snyder; Infielders: 3 Tony Abreu; 29 Brandon Allen; 1 Bobby Crosby; 6 Stephen Drew; 2 Kelly Johnson; 25 Adam LaRoche; 11 Augie Ojeda; 27 Mark Reynolds; 14 Ryan Roberts; 4 Rusty Ryal	Outfielders: 19 Ryan Church; 5 Cole Gillespie; 34 Conor Jackson; 18 Gerardo Parra; 10 Justin Upton; 24 Chris Young	Manager: 23 Kirk Gibson; 7 A. J. Hinch; Coaches: 23 Kirk Gibson (bench); 82 Jeff Motuzas (coach); 16 Bo Porter (third base)(bench); 8 Jack Howell (hitting); 53 Glenn Sherlock (bullpen); 30 Mel Stottlemyre Jr. (pitching); 9 Matt Williams (first base); 7 Joel Youngblood (third base)

== Player stats ==
=== Batting ===
Note: G = Games played; AB = At bats; R = Runs scored; H = Hits; 2B = Doubles; 3B = Triples; HR = Home runs; RBI = Runs batted in; AVG = Batting average; SB = Stolen bases

Player	G	AB	R	H	2B	3B	HR	RBI	AVG	SB
Miguel Montero C*	85	297	36	79	20	2	9	43	.266	0
Adam LaRoche 1B*	151	560	75	146	37	2	25	100	.261	0
Kelly Johnson 2B*	154	585	93	166	36	5	26	71	.284	13
Stephen Drew SS*	151	565	83	157	33	12	15	61	.278	10
Mark Reynolds 3B*	145	499	79	99	17	2	32	85	.198	7
Gerardo Parra LF*	133	364	31	95	19	6	3	30	.261	1
Chris Young CF*	156	584	94	150	33	0	27	91	.257	28
Justin Upton RF*	133	495	73	135	27	3	17	69	.273	18
Chris Snyder	65	195	22	45	8	0	10	32	.231	0
Rusty Ryal	104	207	19	54	7	1	3	11	.261	0
Tony Abreu	81	193	16	45	11	1	1	13	.233	2
Conor Jackson	42	151	19	36	11	0	1	11	.238	4
Cole Gillespie	45	104	11	24	8	0	2	12	.231	1
John Hester	38	95	9	20	7	0	2	7	.211	1
Augie Ojeda	59	79	6	15	3	0	0	5	.190	0
Ryan Roberts	36	66	8	13	4	0	2	9	.197	0
Brandon Allen	22	45	5	12	3	0	1	6	.267	0
Ryan Church	37	49	9	13	5	0	2	7	.265	0
Bobby Crosby	9	12	0	2	2	0	0	2	.167	0
Konrad Schmidt	4	8	0	1	0	0	0	0	.125	0
Pitcher Totals	162	320	25	59	10	0	2	26	.184	1
Team totals	162	5473	713	1366	301	34	180	691	.250	86

- Starters by position noted with an asterisk.

=== Pitching ===
Note: W = Wins; L = Losses; ERA = Earned run average; G = Games pitched; GS = Games started; SV = Saves; IP = Innings pitched; R = Runs allowed; ER = Earned runs allowed; BB = Walks allowed; K = Strikeouts

Player	W	L	ERA	G	GS	SV	IP	R	ER	BB	K
Rodrigo López SP	7	16	5.00	33	33	0	200.0	126	111	56	116
Ian Kennedy SP	9	10	3.80	32	32	0	194.0	87	82	70	168
Dan Haren SP	7	8	4.60	21	21	0	141.0	79	72	29	141
Edwin Jackson SP	6	10	5.16	21	21	0	134.1	80	77	60	104
Barry Enright SP	6	7	3.91	17	17	0	99.0	43	43	29	49
Joe Saunders SP	3	7	4.25	13	13	0	82.2	50	39	19	50
Juan Gutiérrez CL	0	6	5.08	58	0	15	56.2	33	32	23	47
Aaron Heilman RP	5	8	4.50	70	0	6	72.0	37	36	26	55
Blaine Boyer RP	3	2	4.26	54	0	0	57.0	32	27	29	29
Esmerling Vásquez RP	1	6	5.20	57	0	0	53.2	32	31	38	55
Chad Qualls RP	1	4	8.29	43	0	12	38.0	41	35	15	34
Daniel Hudson	7	1	1.69	11	11	0	79.2	15	15	16	70
Sam Demel	2	1	5.35	37	0	2	37.0	27	22	12	33
D.J. Carrasco	1	0	3.18	18	0	0	22.2	15	8	12	20
Dontrelle Willis	1	1	6.85	6	5	0	22.1	17	17	27	14
Carlos Rosa	0	2	4.50	22	0	0	20.0	10	10	12	9
Jordan Norberto	0	2	5.85	33	0	0	20.0	13	13	22	15
César Valdez	1	2	7.65	9	2	0	20.0	19	17	10	13
Leo Rosales	2	0	7.16	16	0	0	16.1	13	13	9	12
Bob Howry	1	0	10.67	14	0	0	14.1	17	17	6	6
Kris Benson	1	1	5.14	3	3	0	14.0	9	8	6	8
Billy Buckner	0	3	11.08	3	3	0	13.0	17	16	5	11
Zach Kroenke	1	0	6.75	3	1	0	6.2	5	5	4	2
Mike Hampton	0	0	0.00	10	0	0	4.1	0	0	1	3
Daniel Stange	0	0	13.50	4	0	0	4.0	6	6	6	2
Saúl Rivera	0	0	22.09	4	0	0	3.2	9	9	3	1
Kevin Mulvey	0	0	6.00	2	0	0	3.0	2	2	2	1
Rafael Rodríguez	0	0	6.75	2	0	0	2.2	2	2	1	2
Team totals	65	97	4.81	162	162	35	1432.0	836	765	548	1070

== Farm system ==
Level	Team	League	Manager
AAA	Reno Aces	Pacific Coast League	Brett Butler
AA	Mobile BayBears	Southern League	Rico Brogna
A	Visalia Rawhide	California League	Audo Vicente
A	South Bend Silver Hawks	Midwest League	Mark Haley
A-Short Season	Yakima Bears	Northwest League	Bob Didier
Rookie	Missoula Osprey	Pioneer League	Héctor de la Cruz
