= Daniel Stange =

American baseball player (born 1985)

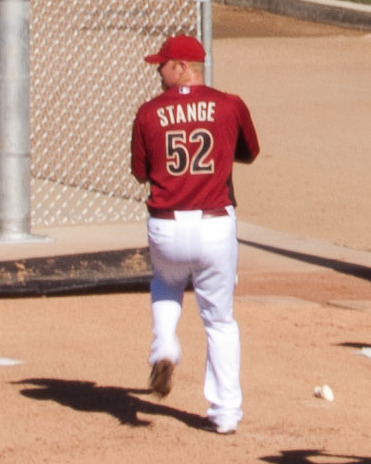
- Stange with the Diamondbacks during spring training in 2011
- Pitcher
- Born: December 22, 1985 (age 40); Orange, California
- Batted: Right Threw: Right

MLB debut
- April 29, 2010, for the Arizona Diamondbacks

Last appearance
- August 4, 2013, for the Los Angeles Angels of Anaheim

MLB statistics
- Win–loss record: 0–1
- Earned run average: 14.29
- Strikeouts: 3
- Stats at Baseball Reference

Teams
- Arizona Diamondbacks (2010); Los Angeles Angels of Anaheim (2013)

Daniel Adam Stange (born December 22, 1985) is a former professional baseball pitcher. He played in Major League Baseball (MLB) for the Arizona Diamondbacks and Los Angeles Angels of Anaheim.

== Career ==
Stange attended Elsinore High School in Wildomar, California, and was drafted by the Atlanta Braves in the 33rd round of the 2003 MLB draft, but didn't sign.

=== Arizona Diamondbacks ===
He also attended the University of California, Riverside, and was drafted by the Arizona Diamondbacks in the 7th round (207th overall) of the 2006 Major League Baseball draft. He was assigned to Advanced Rookie Missoula, where in 27 appearances, he went 5–2 with a 4.25 ERA and 13 saves, striking out 48 in 36 innings.

Stange began the 2007 season with the High-A Visalia Oaks, where in 38 appearances, he went 4–5 with a 3.19 ERA and 16 saves, striking out 53 in 42 1/3 innings. He was named a California League All-Star, along with fellow Oak Brooks Brown. He was promoted to the Double-A Mobile BayBears, where he pitched in five games before being shut down and undergoing Tommy John surgery. Stange began 2008 in June with the Single-A South Bend Silver Hawks, but was promoted in late July to Visalia. In 22 total appearances, he went 2–2 with a 2.64 ERA and one save, striking out 31 in 30 2/3 innings.

Stange spent 2009 with Mobile, where in 39 appearances, he went 0–4 with a 4.88 ERA and 10 saves, striking out 44 in 51 2/3 innings. On November 24, 2009, the Diamondbacks added Stange to their 40-man roster to protect him from the Rule 5 draft

Stange began 2010 with thr Triple-A Reno Aces, but on May 29, Stange and Kevin Mulvey were recalled, replacing Kris Benson and Leo Rosales, who were placed on the disabled list. Stange made his debut that day, retiring all three batters he faced in the ninth against the Chicago Cubs. His first strikeout was of Ryan Theriot in his second appearance. On May 12, Stange was optioned to Reno, in order to clear roster space for Carlos Rosa. In July, he was demoted to Mobile, where he finished the season. In 4 games with the Diamondbacks, he gave up 6 run in 4 innings, striking out 2. After the season, Stange played with the Scottsdale Scorpions of the Arizona Fall League.

On January 18, 2011, Stange was designated for assignment; he cleared waivers and was sent outright to Reno on January 26. Stange spent the entirety of the 2011 campaign with Reno, where in he pitched in 25 games before missing the last month of the season due to injury. In 36 2/3 innings, he went 3–1 with a 6.14 ERA and 29 strikeouts. Stange began the 2012 season with Reno, but was released on April 18, 2012 after a poor start to the year.

=== Bridgeport Bluefish ===
On April 29, 2012, Stange signed with the independent Bridgeport Bluefish of the Atlantic League of Professional Baseball. Stange made three appearances for the Bluefish, recording a 2.25 ERA with six strikeouts over four innings of work.

=== San Diego Padres ===
Stange had his contract purchased by the San Diego Padres on May 7, 2012. He was assigned to the Double-A San Antonio Missions, where he finished the season. Stange also had a two-game stint with the Triple-A Tucson Padres. In 46 games with the Missions, he logged a 3–6 record with a 3.35 ERA and six saves, striking out 64 in 53 2/3 innings.

On November 29, 2012, Stange re-signed with the Padres on a minor league contract that included an invitation to spring training. In seven appearances with the Padres during spring training, he gave up four runs in seven innings, striking out seven. Stange began 2013 with Tucson, where he pitched in 26 games before being opting out of his contract on June 17, 2013.

=== Los Angeles Angels ===
On June 22, 2013, Stange signed a minor league contract with the Los Angeles Angels of Anaheim, and was assigned to the Triple-A Salt Lake Bees. On July 29, Stange was called up by the Angels, replacing Brad Hawpe, who was designated for assignment. He was optioned back to Salt Lake on August 6 to make roster space for recently acquired Grant Green. In three games with Los Angeles, Stange gave up three runs and recorded one strikeout in 1 2/3 innings. He was removed from the 40-man roster and sent outright to Triple-A on September 22, but subsequently elected free agency. In 26 games with Salt Lake, Stange compiled a 4–1 record with a 5.06 ERA, striking out 30 in 26 2/3 innings.

=== Washington Nationals ===
On November 21, 2013, Stange signed a minor league contract with the Washington Nationals that included an invitation to spring training. He made 44 relief appearances for the Triple-A Syracuse Chiefs, accumulating a 2-3 record and 3.64 ERA with 43 strikeouts across 59 1/3 innings pitched. Stange became a free agent on September 4, 2014.
