= Lindborg-Cregg Field =

- Location in the United States Location in Montana
- Interactive map of Lindborg-Cregg Field
- Address: Dale Dahlgren American Legion Baseball Complex
- Location: Missoula, Montana
- Coordinates: 46.857°N 114.062°W
- Elevation: 3,150 ft (960 m)
- Owner: Missoula County
- Operator: American Legion Hellgate Post #27

Construction
- Groundbreaking: 1984
- Opened: June 1987; 39 years ago

Tenants
- Missoula Mavericks (ALB) 1987–present Missoula Osprey (PL) 1999–2003

Lindborg-Cregg Memorial Field is a baseball park in the Western United States, located in Missoula, Montana. With a seating capacity of 2,200 people, it is the home of the Missoula Mavericks, an American Legion team. It was also home to the minor league Missoula Osprey for five seasons, prior to the opening of Ogren Park at Allegiance Field in 2004.

The natural grass field is aligned southwest (home plate to second base) at an approximate elevation of 3,150 feet (960 m) above sea level.
