= Missoula PaddleHeads =

American minor-league professional baseball team

- Founded in 1999; Missoula, Montana
Team logo
Cap insignia

Minor league affiliations
- Class: Independent (from 2021)
- Previous classes: Rookie Advanced (1999–2020)
- League: Pioneer League (1999–present)

Major league affiliations
- Team: Independent (from 2021)
- Previous teams: Arizona Diamondbacks (1999–2020)

Minor league titles
- League titles (5): 1999; 2006; 2012; 2015; 2021
- Division titles (5): 1999; 2006; 2009; 2021; 2022

Team data
- Name: Missoula PaddleHeads (2020–present)
- Previous names: Missoula Osprey (1999–2019)
- Colors: Forest green, moose brown, hunter orange, paddle tan, Clark Fork blue
- Ballpark: Ogren Park at Allegiance Field (2004–present)
- Previous parks: Lindborg-Cregg Field (1999–2003)
- Owner/ Operator: Big Sky Professional Baseball
- President: Matt Ellis
- Manager: Michael Schlact
- Website: gopaddleheads.com

The Missoula PaddleHeads are an independent baseball team of the Pioneer League, which is not affiliated with Major League Baseball (MLB) but is an MLB Partner League. They are located in Missoula, Montana, and play their home games at Ogren Park at Allegiance Field.

In conjunction with a contraction of Minor League Baseball in 2021, the Pioneer League, of which the PaddleHeads have been members since 1999, was converted from an MLB-affiliated Rookie Advanced league to an independent baseball league and granted status as an MLB Partner League, with Missoula continuing as members. Prior to this, the PaddleHeads had been affiliated with the Arizona Diamondbacks (1996–2020).

The team has won the Pioneer League championship five times; in 1999, 2006, 2012, 2015, and 2021.

The club was known as the Missoula Osprey from 1999 through the 2019 season. Previously, the franchise played in Lethbridge, Alberta, as the Lethbridge Black Diamonds. Missoula has had baseball since the early 1900s, with previous team names being the Highlanders and the Timberjacks.

In 2019, the team rebranded as the Missoula PaddleHeads, a term referencing moose antlers being known as "paddles", making the male moose a "paddlehead". The brand also showcases the diversity of kayaking, canoeing and other river-based activities found in Missoula, while the logo features a baseball bat paddle and a partially submerged moose.

== Missoula alumni with MLB experience ==
Eighty-six Missoula players have also played in Major League Baseball. They are:

1999
JD Closser, Jorge de la Rosa, Doug DeVore, Lyle Overbay, Duaner Sánchez, Luis Terrero (1999–2000)
2000
Casey Daigle, Jerry Gil, Andy Green, Phil Stockman, José Valverde
2001
Scott Hairston
2002
Dustin Nippert, Tony Peña, Sergio Santos, Miguel Montero (2002–2003)
2003
Emilio Bonifacio, Carlos González,
2004
Wilkin Castillo, Steven Jackson, Esmerling Vásquez
2005
Pedro Ciriaco, Rusty Ryal, Greg Smith
2006
Héctor Ambriz, Tony Barnette, Gerardo Parra, John Hester, Jordan Norberto, Daniel Stange, Clay Zavada
2007
Bryan Augenstein, Tommy Layne, Evan Scribner, Rey Navarro (2007–2008)
2008
Jake Elmore, Daniel Schlereth, Bryan Shaw
2009
Chase Anderson, Mike Belfiore, Charles Brewer, Keon Broxton, Eury De La Rosa, Paul Goldschmidt, Bradin Hagens, Ender Inciarte, Chris Owings, Patrick Schuster (2009–2010), Enrique Burgos (2009, 2011)
2010
Adam Eaton, David Holmberg, Stephen Cardullo (2010–2011)
2011
Archie Bradley, Ryan Court, Keith Hessler, DJ Johnson
2012
Socrates Brito, Jake Lamb, Michael Perez, Andrew Velazquez
2013
Silvino Bracho, Steve Hathaway, Daniel Palka, Brad Keller (2013–2014), Justin Williams (2013–2014)
2014
Sergio Alcántara, Kevin Cron, Touki Toussaint, Gabriel Moya (2014–2015), Yefry Ramirez (2014–2015), José Herrera (2014, 2016)
2015
Isan Díaz, Marcus Wilson
2016
Jazz Chisholm Jr., Jhoan Durán, Luís Madero (2016–2017), Luis Castillo (2016, 2018)
2017
José Caballero, Elvis Luciano
2018
Buddy Kennedy, Cristofer Ogando, Geraldo Perdomo, Alek Thomas
2019
Dominic Canzone, Justin Martínez, Liover Peguero

== Roster ==
Missoula PaddleHeads Roster
Active (25-man) Roster	Coaching Staff
Pitchers: 9 Alfredo Villa; 33 Chris Burica; 51 Cole Cook; 7 Justin Crump; 2 Davis Delorefice; 52 William Freeman; 41 Kevin Gould; 23 Matt Mogollon; 48 Domingo Pena; 31 Mason Schwellenbach; 28 Cas Silber; 10 Mark Simon; 28 Cody Thompson; 16 Palmer Wenzel; 32 Garrett Westberg; Catchers: 37 Dean Nevarez; Infielders: 5 Chris Eusay; 4 Nick Gatewood; 15 Luke Navigato; 55 Jayson Newman; 30 McLain O'Connor; 22 Cameron Thompson; 8 A.J. Wright; Outfielders: 3 Jared Akins; 6 Brandon Riley; 11 Jacob Talamante	Manager: -- Michael Schlact; Coaches: 25 Bobby Brown (bench); 8 George Horton (bench); 29 Mason Przybilla (bench); Disabled list; ‡ Inactive list; >§ Suspended list; Roster updated April 18, 2024 Transactions
