= Eury De La Rosa =

Dominican baseball player (born 1990)

- Pitcher
- Born: February 24, 1990 (age 36); Santiago, Dominican Republic
- Batted: Left Threw: Left

MLB debut
- July 14, 2013, for the Arizona Diamondbacks

Last MLB appearance
- September 26, 2014, for the Arizona Diamondbacks

MLB statistics
- Win–loss record: 2–1
- Earned run average: 4.21
- Strikeouts: 48
- Stats at Baseball Reference

Teams
- Arizona Diamondbacks (2013–2014)

Eury De La Rosa (born February 24, 1990) is a Dominican former professional baseball pitcher. He played in Major League Baseball (MLB) for the Arizona Diamondbacks.

== Career ==
=== Arizona Diamondbacks ===
De La Rosa was signed as an amateur free agent by the Arizona Diamondbacks on June 27, 2008. He began his professional career that year with the Diamondbacks' Dominican Summer League team and then moved to the Pioneer League the next year with the Missoula Osprey.

In 2010 with the Yakima Bears of the Northwest League he had a 1.00 earned run average (ERA) in 27 games and was selected to the post-season all-star team. The following year he had a 1.36 ERA in 39 games for the South Bend Silver Hawks of the Single–A Midwest League. In 2012, he was in 53 games for the Southern League champion Mobile BayBears, with a 2.84 ERA.

De La Rosa began 2013 with the Triple–A Reno Aces of the Pacific Coast League and was then promoted to the Majors with the Diamondbacks where he made his debut with two perfect innings of relief against the Milwaukee Brewers on July 14. In 19 appearances for the Diamondbacks during his rookie campaign, De La Rosa struggled to an 0–1 record and 7.36 ERA with 16 strikeouts across 14 2/3 innings pitched.

De La Rosa made 25 relief appearances for Arizona during the 2014 season, posting a 2–0 record and 2.95 ERA with 32 strikeouts across 36 2/3 innings pitched. On December 12, 2014, De La Rosa was designated for assignment following the acquisitions of Rubby De La Rosa and Allen Webster.

=== Oakland Athletics ===
The Diamondbacks traded De La Rosa to the Oakland Athletics for cash considerations on December 18, 2014, and the Athletics designated him for assignment on April 25, 2015. He appeared in seven games for the Nashville Sounds and did not allow a run in his six innings of relief.

=== Los Angeles Dodgers ===
On April 30, 2015, De La Rosa was claimed off waivers by the Los Angeles Dodgers and assigned to the Triple–A Oklahoma City Dodgers. In six appearances for Oklahoma City, he struggled to a 6.14 ERA with six strikeouts across 7 1/3 innings pitched. De La Rosa was designated for assignment on May 19.

=== San Diego Padres ===
On May 23, 2015, De La Rosa was claimed off waivers by the San Diego Padres. He was designated for assignment on June 19, following the promotion of Brett Wallace. On June 21, De La Rosa cleared waivers and was sent outright to the Triple–A El Paso Chihuahuas. In 17 appearances for the Chihuahuas, he struggled to a 6.50 ERA with 15 strikeouts; however, he saw better results with the Double-A San Antonio Missions, for whom he logged a 1.27 ERA with 29 strikeouts and seven saves in 19 games.

=== Long Island Ducks ===
On April 18, 2016, De La Rosa signed with the Long Island Ducks of the Atlantic League of Professional Baseball. In 39 appearances (three starts) for Long Island, De La Rosa posted a 3–4 record and 3.26 ERA with 60 strikeouts and one save over 47 innings of work.

=== Houston Astros ===
On August 14, 2016, De La Rosa's contract was purchased by the Houston Astros organization. In three games (two starts) for the Triple–A Fresno Grizzlies, he struggled to an 0–3 record and 15.95 ERA with three strikeouts over 7 1/3 innings. De La Rosa elected free agency following the season on November 7.

=== Long Island Ducks (second stint) ===
On February 15, 2017, De La Rosa re–signed with the Long Island Ducks of the Atlantic League of Professional Baseball. In 15 games for the Ducks, he struggled to a 6.38 ERA with 10 strikeouts across 18 1/3 innings pitched. De La Rosa became a free agent after the season.

After the 2020 season, he played for Panama in the 2021 Caribbean Series.
