= List of Arizona Diamondbacks managers =

There have been a total of nine managers in the history of the Arizona Diamondbacks Major League Baseball (MLB) franchise of the National League. The Diamondbacks franchise was formed in the 1998 Major League Baseball season as a member of the National League. Buck Showalter was hired as the first Diamondbacks manager. Showalter served for three (1998–2000) seasons before being replaced after the 2000 season. Al Pedrique, Alan Trammell, A. J. Hinch, and Chip Hale are the only managers in the Diamondbacks history to not lead a team into the playoffs, although Trammell and Pedrique did not manage a whole season. Five managers have led the Diamondbacks to the playoffs.

In the 2000 baseball season, the Diamondbacks decided to replace Buck Showalter with Bob Brenly. The following year, Brenly led the Diamondbacks to win the 2001 World Series. Brenly has the highest winning percentage for all Diamondback managers along with the most playoff games managed and won. However, after a poor 2003 and start of the 2004 season, Brenly was also released and was replaced by Al Pedrique, the third base coach for the Diamondbacks at the time. His 22 wins in 83 games managed for a .265 winning percentage is the lowest for all Diamondback managers in history. At the end of that season, the Diamondbacks originally hired Wally Backman as their new manager for the team. Though, after allegations of Backman driving under the influence, the Diamondbacks decided to instead hire Bob Melvin as their new manager instead of hiring Backman. Prior to the May 8, 2009 game, the Diamondbacks replaced Melvin with A. J. Hinch, who in turn was fired after the next season; Hinch has the lowest winning percentage for any fulltime Diamondback manager in history (.420). Kirk Gibson managed the next five seasons before being fired in 2014; he was replaced by Chip Hale, who managed for two seasons before being let go in 2016. The current manager of Diamondbacks is Torey Lovullo, who was hired in 2017. During the 2022 season, Lovullo became the all-time winningest and longest tenured Diamondback manager in history.

== Key ==
| # | Number of managers^{[A]} |
| G | Regular-season games managed |
| W | Regular-season wins |
| L | Regular-season losses |
| Win% | Winning percentage |
| PA | Playoff appearances |
| PW | Playoff wins |
| PL | Playoff losses |

Statistics are accurate as of the end of the 2026 MLB season.

== Managers ==
| #^{[a]} | Image | Manager | Seasons | G | W | L | Win% | PA | PW | PL | LC | WS | Achievements | Ref |
|---|---|---|---|---|---|---|---|---|---|---|---|---|---|---|
| 1 | | Buck Showalter | 1998–2000 | 486 | 250 | 236 | .514 | 4 | 1 | 3 | | | 1999 National League West Championship. | |
| 2 | | Bob Brenly | 2001–2004 | 565 | 303 | 262 | .536 | 20 | 11 | 9 | 1 | 1 | 2001 & 2002 National League West Championship; 2001 National League Championship; 2001 World Series Championship | |
| 3 | | Al Pedrique | 2004 | 83 | 22 | 61 | .265 | – | – | – | | | | |
| 4 | | Bob Melvin | 2005–2009 | 677 | 337 | 340 | .498 | 7 | 3 | 4 | | | 2007 National League Manager of Year; 2007 National League West Championship | |
| 5 | | A. J. Hinch | 2009–2010 | 212 | 89 | 123 | .420 | – | – | – | | | | |
| 6 | | Kirk Gibson | 2010–2014 | 728 | 353 | 375 | .485 | 5 | 2 | 3 | | | 2011 National League Manager of Year; 2011 National League West Championship | |
| 7 | | Alan Trammell | 2014 | 3 | 1 | 2 | .333 | – | – | – | | | | |
| 8 | | Chip Hale | 2015–2016 | 324 | 148 | 176 | .457 | – | – | – | | | | |
| 9 | | Torey Lovullo | 2017–present | 1518 | 750 | 768 | .494 | 21 | 11 | 10 | 1 | | 2017 National League Manager of Year; 2017 & 2023 National League Wild Card; 2023 National League Championship | |

Wally Backman was hired as the Diamondbacks manager on November 1, 2004, but was fired four days later on November 5, 2004, due to off-field issues.

== Notes ==
- ^{A} A running total of the number of managers of the Diamondbacks. Thus any manager who has had two or more terms as manager is only counted once.
