= Josh Byrnes =

American baseball executive (born 1970)

Colorado Rockies
- General manager
- Born: June 23, 1970 (age 56); Washington, District of Columbia, U.S.

Teams
- Cleveland Indians (1994–1999); Colorado Rockies (2000–2002); Boston Red Sox (2003–2004); Arizona Diamondbacks (2005–2010); San Diego Padres (2011–2014); Los Angeles Dodgers (2014–2025); Colorado Rockies (2026–present)

Career highlights and awards
- 4× World Series champion (2004, 2020, 2024, 2025)

Josh Byrnes (born June 23, 1970) is an American baseball executive who currently serves as the general manager for the Colorado Rockies of Major League Baseball (MLB).

Byrnes began his career in 1994 as an intern with the Cleveland Indians. He rose to scouting director in 1998 and then joined the Colorado Rockies as assistant general manager after the 1999 season. He moved to the Boston Red Sox as assistant general manager in 2003 and was with the team in 2004 when they won their first World Series title since 1918. Byrnes was executive vice president and general manager of the Arizona Diamondbacks (2005-2010) and the San Diego Padres (2011-2014). He joined the Los Angeles Dodgers in 2014 as their senior vice president of baseball operations and during his tenure the team won five National League pennants and three World Series titles.

== Early life ==
Byrnes grew up in Washington, D.C., where he attended and played second base for St. Albans School, breaking the single-season hits record. He was recruited by Haverford College, where he was team captain and set records for home runs and RBI. He graduated in 1992 with a BA in English.

== Executive career ==
=== Cleveland Indians ===
Byrnes joined the Cleveland Indians in 1994 after meeting with Ronald M. Shapiro, the father of Mark Shapiro, who would become the team's general manager, at a Haverford College Alumni game. He quickly worked his way up the organizational ladder, first as an intern, then as advance scout, and then to scouting director in 1998. The Cleveland Indians won the American League Championship Series and advanced to the World Series in 1995 and 1997; and won Central Division titles in 1995, 1996, 1997, 1998 and 1999.

=== Colorado Rockies ===
In 1999, Byrnes was hired by general manager, Dan O'Dowd, to fill the assistant general manager position for the Colorado Rockies, where he was in charge of the farm and scouting departments.

=== Boston Red Sox ===
Byrnes joined the Boston Red Sox as assistant general manager in 2003 when he was recruited by the team's general manager, Theo Epstein. In his second season with the Boston Red Sox, the team won the 2004 World Series. It was the Red Sox' first World Series championship since 1918, ending what remains the third longest championship drought in the history of any Major League team, after the Chicago White Sox (1917–2005) and the Chicago Cubs (1908–2016).

In a 2005 interview with The Boston Globe, Epstein said of Byrnes, "He's a key voice in player personnel. He's got as much a feel for evaluating and statistical analysis as anyone in baseball.”

=== Arizona Diamondbacks ===
Byrnes joined the Arizona Diamondbacks as general manager in 2006, where he remained until July 1, 2010. In the two seasons preceding his arrival, the Diamondbacks had the worst run differential in the National League. Charged with reducing payroll and adding youth to the roster, Byrnes pushed the team forward towards contention. The 2007 team won the NL West division and advanced to the NLCS, as one of eight lower-third payroll teams to accomplish that feat since 2006. The 2008 team held first place in their division until September.

Byrnes appointed A. J. Hinch as manager during the 2009 season, which would largely define his tenure with the team. The move was considered unorthodox because of Hinch's prior front office position in player development, rather than in on-field coaching. According to a 2016 story by Ken Rosenthal of Fox Sports, Byrnes “actually was ahead of his time. ... I was one of many in the media who was critical of the move and Byrnes’ framing of it. But the rationales that made Hinch's hiring so controversial are now almost standard, barely drawing notice today.” Hinch went on to achieve major success in his next managerial post with the Houston Astros, including winning the 2017 World Series, four postseason appearances, and three consecutive 100-win regular seasons in 2017, 2018, and 2019.

After Byrnes left the team in 2010, the Diamondbacks won the division in 2011 with a lower-third payroll from a roster he had largely constructed. In a 15-year span, Arizona trails only Tampa Bay, Cleveland and Oakland in producing 90-win seasons with a lower-third payroll. In addition, Byrnes oversaw the 2006–2010 drafts for the Diamondbacks, which have produced over 195 WAR (Wins above Replacement) through the conclusion of the 2020 season - a higher total than any other team has produced in those five drafts. Max Scherzer (2006), Paul Goldschmidt (2009), AJ Pollock (2009) and Adam Eaton (2010) are a few of the notable picks from those drafts. In 2009, Byrnes traded Max Scherzer to the Detroit Tigers and later acknowledged his regret in making that trade. Byrnes reunited with Scherzer in 2021 through a trade with the Washington Nationals to add him to the Los Angeles Dodgers.

=== San Diego Padres ===
Byrnes joined the San Diego Padres as senior vice president of baseball operations in 2010. In 2011, he was promoted to general manager.

By spring 2012, it was clear that MLB was not going to approve Jeff Moorad’s purchase of the Padres. As a result, Byrnes was an inherited GM for a new ownership group led by Ron Fowler. When the Padres did not perform according to Fowler's expectations, he relieved Byrnes of his duties. However, from 2012-2014, the Padres' average payroll was 26th out of 30 teams.

During Byrnes' tenure with the Padres, the club selected Max Fried (seventh overall) and Zach Eflin (33rd overall, compensation round) in the 2012 draft, Hunter Renfroe (13th overall) in the 2013 draft and Trea Turner (13th overall) in the 2014 draft. All four went on to accumulate at least 6 wins above replacement in their major league careers. Before Renfroe's major league debut, Baseball America described him as the franchise's best hope for its first impactful first-round selection since Derrek Lee in 1993. Fried received Cy Young Award votes and Turner received MVP votes, and both were selected to the All-Star Game as National League players.

In 2014, Byrnes' final season with the club, the Padres allowed 577 runs, the fewest in franchise history for a 162-game season. He also engineered a trade with Cincinnati to acquire Yasmani Grandal, Yonder Alonso and Brad Boxberger, who all became All-Stars.

=== Los Angeles Dodgers ===
In 2014, Byrnes joined the Los Angeles Dodgers as senior vice president of baseball operations. He was recruited by Andrew Friedman, who had just joined the team as president of baseball operations. With Byrnes at the helm of scouting and the farm system, the team posted their five best winning percentage seasons as a franchise since moving to Los Angeles in 1958. The Dodgers have advanced to the World Series in 2017, 2018 and 2020 and in 2019, the Dodgers finished the season with the most victories in franchise history (106). The 2020 Dodgers went 43-17 during the COVID-19 shortened regular season and won their first World Series in 32 years. Called "historically great" by CBS Sports, the 2022 Dodgers were one of the best MLB teams of all time.

In 2020, MLB Pipeline ranked the Dodgers farm system as the third best in the game with five prospects listed among MLB Pipeline’s top 100: Gavin Lux, SS/2B (No. 2), Dustin May, RHP (No. 23), Josiah Gray, RHP (No. 67), Keibert Ruiz, C (No. 73) and Brusdar Graterol, RHP (No. 83). Lux, May and catcher Will Smith came from the 2016 Draft, which, according to MLB.com, may go down as the most productive since the Dodgers’ legendary 1968 Draft put 11 players in the Major Leagues.

Five players for the Dodgers received Rookie of the Year votes during Byrnes’ time with the team. They included Corey Seager, who won the award in 2016, and Cody Bellinger, who won the award in 2017, as well as Walker Buehler, Tony Gonsolin and Dustin May. Baseball America called Los Angeles the model franchise in the sport during his tenure as senior vice president.

=== Colorado Rockies (second stint) ===
On December 3, 2025, the Colorado Rockies hired Byrnes to serve as their general manager under president of baseball operations Paul DePodesta.
