= Rey Navarro =

Puerto Rican baseball player (born 1989)

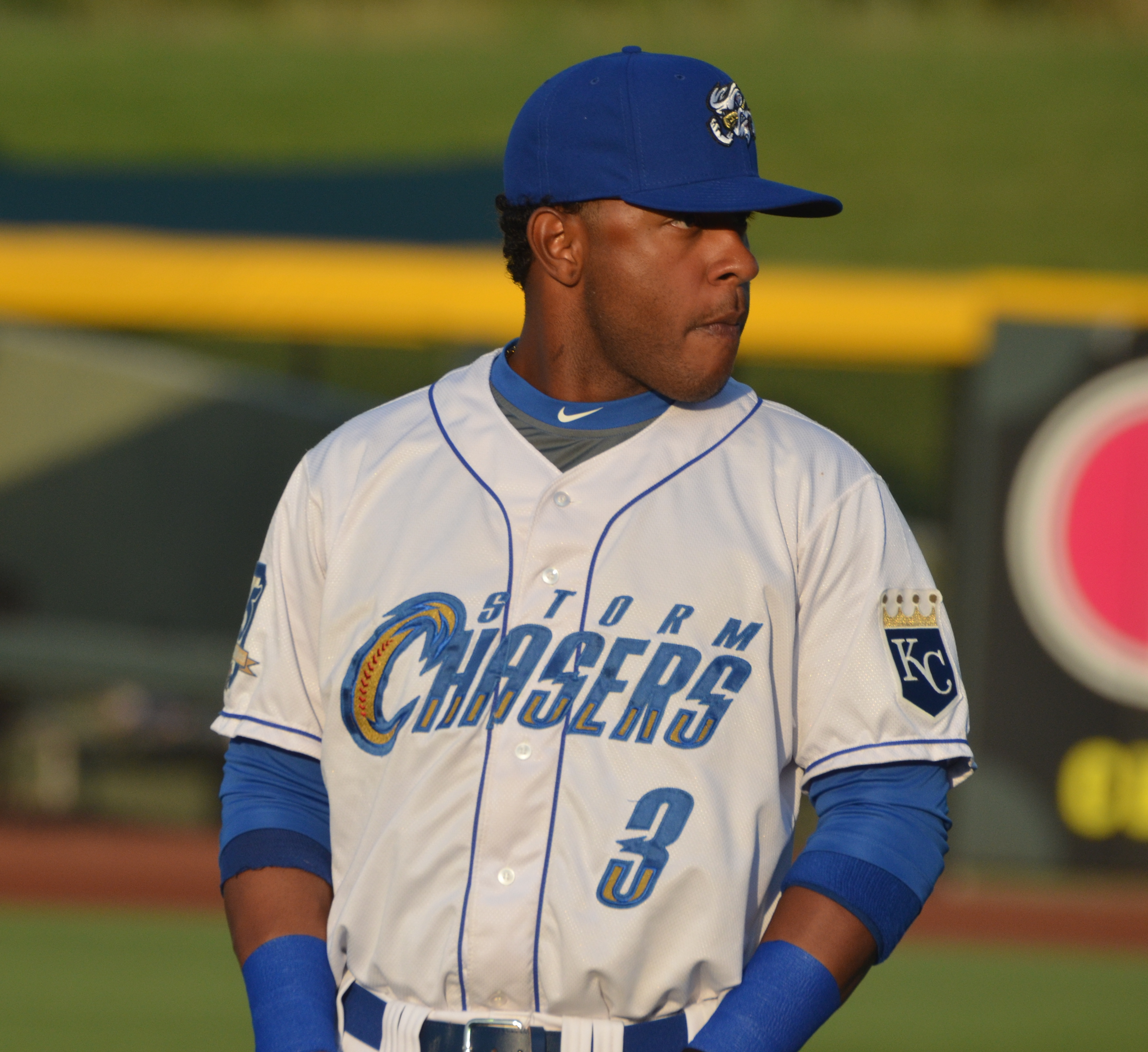
- Navarro with the Omaha Storm Chasers in 2013
- Second baseman
- Born: December 22, 1989 (age 35); Caguas, Puerto Rico
- Batted: Switch Threw: Right

MLB debut
- April 24, 2015, for the Baltimore Orioles

Last MLB appearance
- May 20, 2015, for the Baltimore Orioles

MLB statistics
- Batting average: .276
- Home runs: 1
- Runs batted in: 3
- Stats at Baseball Reference

Teams
- Baltimore Orioles (2015)

Reynaldo Navarro (born December 22, 1989) is a Puerto Rican former professional baseball second baseman. He played in Major League Baseball (MLB) with the Baltimore Orioles in 2015.

== Career ==
=== Arizona Diamondbacks ===
Navarro was drafted by the Arizona Diamondbacks in the third round (103rd overall) of the 2007 Major League Baseball draft out of the Puerto Rico Baseball Academy. He made his professional debut with the rookie-level Missoula Osprey. Navarro made 72 appearances for Missoula in 2008, hitting .258/.323/.385 with two home runs, 31 RBI, and 17 stolen bases.

In 2009, Navarro played in 121 games for the Single-A South Bend Silver Hawks, slashing .262/.308/.339 with 46 RBI and 12 stolen bases. Navarro made 19 appearances for the High-A Visalia Rawhide in 2010, batting .241/.307/.329 with one home run, seven RBI, and two stolen bases.

=== Kansas City Royals ===
On May 2, 2010, Navarro was traded to the Kansas City Royals in exchange for Carlos Rosa. He spent the remainder of the season with the High-A Wilmington Blue Rocks, hitting .237 with five home runs and 38 RBI over 107 games. Navarro split the 2011 season between Wilmington and the Double-A Northwest Arkansas Naturals, slashing a cumulative .280/.335/.422 with nine home runs, 59 RBI, and 11 stolen bases.

Navarro split the 2012 season between Northwest Arkansas and the Triple-A Omaha Storm Chasers, batting a combined .257/.316/.333 with four home runs, 48 RBI, and 10 stolen bases. He spent the entirety of the 2013 campaign with Northwest Arkansas, playing in 119 games and hitting .283/.310/.428 with 12 home runs, 58 RBI, and six stolen bases. Navarro elected free agency following the season on November 4, 2013.

=== Cincinnati Reds ===
On November 11, 2013, Navarro signed a minor league contract with the Cincinnati Reds organization. Navarro split the 2014 season between the Double-A Pensacola Blue Wahoos and Triple-A Louisville Bats, hitting .282/.343/.435 with 12 home runs and 57 RBI across 132 total appearances.

=== Baltimore Orioles ===
Navarro signed a major league contract with the Baltimore Orioles on November 26, 2014. He was called up to the major leagues on April 24, 2015. Navarro collected his first major league hit, a double, and run during his debut. The very next game, he went 3-for-5 with his first big-league RBI, to help the Orioles defeat the Boston Red Sox, 18–7. On May 13, in a game against the Toronto Blue Jays, Navarro hit his first major league home run off of relief pitcher Brett Cecil. He was designated for assignment by the Orioles on December 14, after Darren O'Day was re-signed.

=== Los Angeles Angels ===
On December 23, 2015, the Los Angeles Angels of Anaheim claimed Navarro off waivers. He was sent outright to Triple-A Salt Lake Bees on November 18.

Navarro re–signed with the Angels on a minor league contract on November 23, 2016. He played in 126 games for the Triple–A Salt Lake Bees, batting .279/.342/.380 with seven home runs and 82 RBI. Navarro elected free agency following the season on November 6, 2017.

=== Seattle Mariners ===
On January 16, 2018, Navarro signed a minor league contract with the Seattle Mariners. He made seven appearances for the Triple-A Tacoma Rainiers, going 4-for-27 (.148) with one home run and six RBI. Navarro was released by the Mariners organization on April 27.

=== Sugar Land Skeeters ===
On May 8, 2018, Navarro signed with the Sugar Land Skeeters of the Atlantic League of Professional Baseball. In three appearances for Sugar Land, he went 6-for-11 (.546) with two home runs and three RBI.

=== New York Yankees ===
On May 11, 2018, Navarro signed a minor league contract with the New York Yankees. After a brief stint with the Double–A Trenton Thunder, he was promoted to the Triple–A Scranton/Wilkes-Barre RailRiders, for whom he play the remainder of the season, hitting .242/.285/.409 with 10 home runs and 28 RBI. Navarro elected free agency following the season on November 2.

=== Somerset Patriots ===
On April 15, 2019, Navarro signed with the Somerset Patriots of the Atlantic League of Professional Baseball. In 83 appearances for Somerset, he slashed .272/.340/.612 with five home runs, 24 RBI, and two stolen bases. Navarro became a free agent following the season.
