= Ogren Park at Allegiance Field =

Baseball stadium in Missoula, Montana

- Allegiance Field
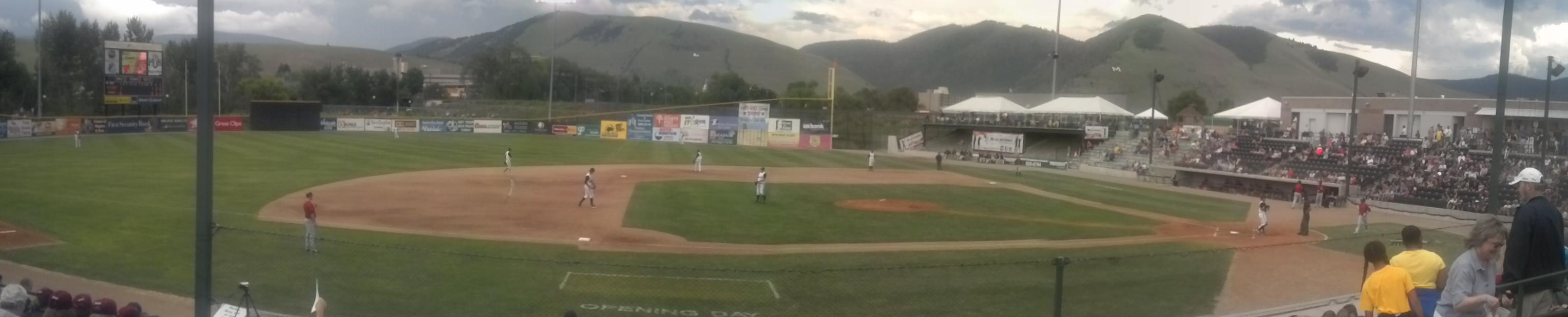
- Panorama of Ogren Park

- Location in the United States Location in Montana
- Interactive map of Ogren Park at Allegiance Field
- Former names: Missoula Civic Stadium
- Address: 700 Cregg Lane
- Location: Missoula, Montana
- Coordinates: 46.873°N 114.007°W
- Owner: City of Missoula
- Operator: Play Ball Missoula
- Capacity: 5,000
- Record attendance: 4,919 (July 3, 2017)

Construction
- Groundbreaking: July 17, 2003
- Opened: June 18, 2004; 22 years ago
- Cost: $6 Million ($10.2 million in 2025 dollars)
- Architects: Heery International; CTA Architects
- General contractor: Quality Construction Co.

Tenant
- Missoula PaddleHeads (2004–present)

Ogren Park at Allegiance Field is a stadium in the Western United States, located in Missoula, Montana. Primarily used for minor league baseball, it is the home field of the Missoula PaddleHeads of the Pioneer League. Built in 2004, the ballpark seats 5,000 people and replaced Lindbord-Cregg Field.

The field dimensions are 309 feet (94 m) down the left field line, 398 feet (121 m) to center field, and 287 feet (87 m) down the right field line, which includes a 27-foot-high (8.2 m) wall. Just south of the Clark Fork River, the natural grass field is aligned northeast (home plate to second base) at an approximate elevation of 3,200 feet (975 m) above sea level.

On July 3, 2012, 4,316 attended a game between the Missoula Osprey and the Billings Mustangs at the facility, a venue record.

== Notable performers ==
Other uses for the stadium include concerts and plays. Some of the most notable performers at Ogren Park include:

- Dierks Bentley - July 4, 2008
- Steve Martin - July 20, 2012
- Mumford & Sons - August 11, 2019
