= Miguel Montero =

Venezuelan baseball player (born 1983)

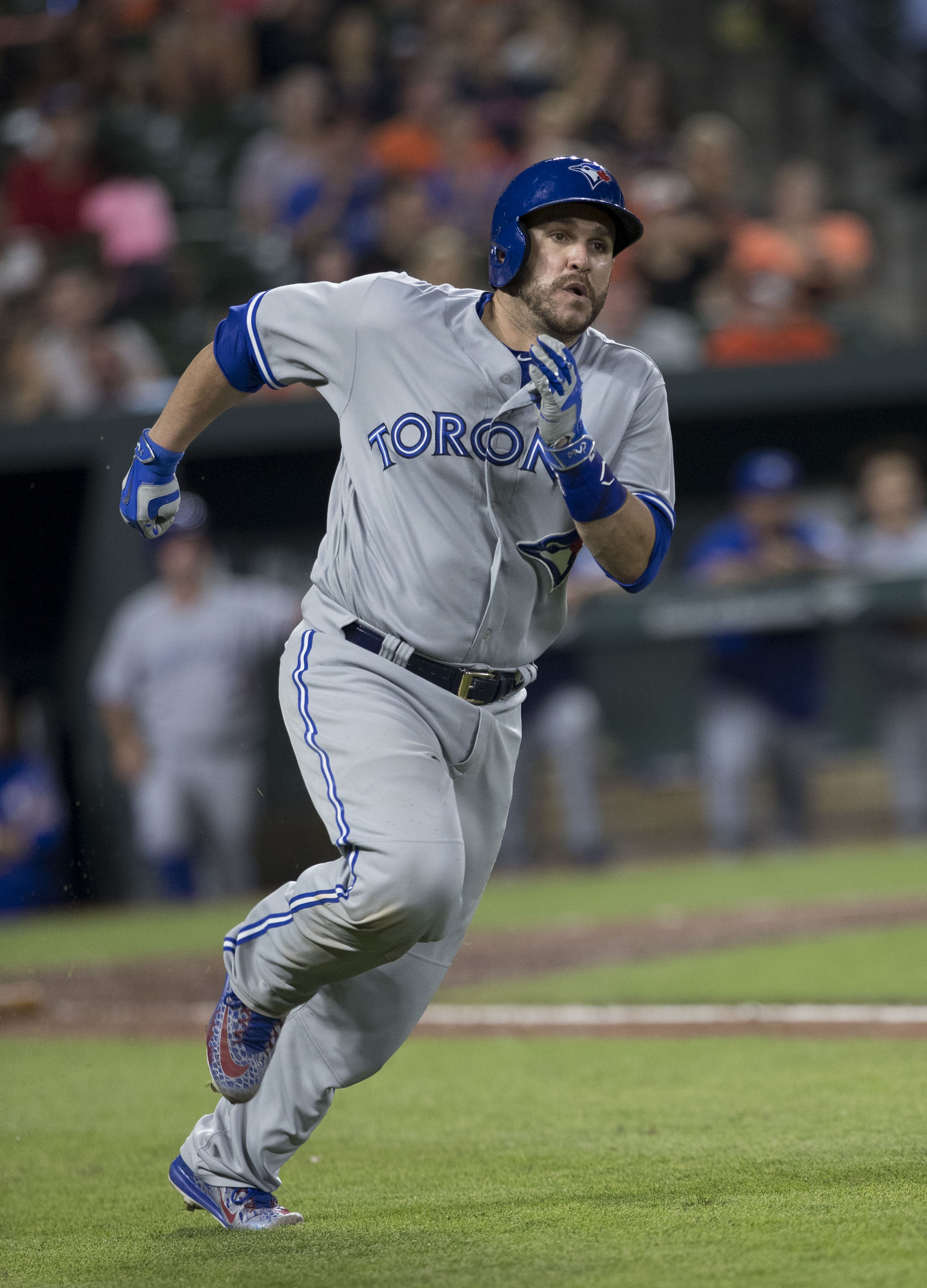
- Montero with the Toronto Blue Jays in 2017
- Catcher
- Born: July 9, 1983 (age 43); Caracas, Venezuela
- Batted: Left Threw: Right

MLB debut
- September 6, 2006, for the Arizona Diamondbacks

Last MLB appearance
- April 5, 2018, for the Washington Nationals

MLB statistics
- Batting average: .256
- Home runs: 126
- Runs batted in: 550
- Stats at Baseball Reference

Teams
- Arizona Diamondbacks (2006–2014); Chicago Cubs (2015–2017); Toronto Blue Jays (2017); Washington Nationals (2018)

Career highlights and awards
- 2× All-Star (2011, 2014); World Series champion (2016)

Miguel Angel Montero Fernandez (born July 9, 1983) is a Venezuelan-American former professional baseball catcher. He played in Major League Baseball (MLB) for the Arizona Diamondbacks, Chicago Cubs, Toronto Blue Jays, and Washington Nationals. Montero is a two-time MLB All-Star and won the World Series with the Cubs in 2016.

== Professional career ==
=== Arizona Diamondbacks ===
The Arizona Diamondbacks signed Montero as an undrafted free agent in 2001 for a $13,000 signing bonus.

Since his arrival in the United States, Montero was coached by veteran manager and former catcher Bill Plummer throughout his time with the Diamondbacks organization.

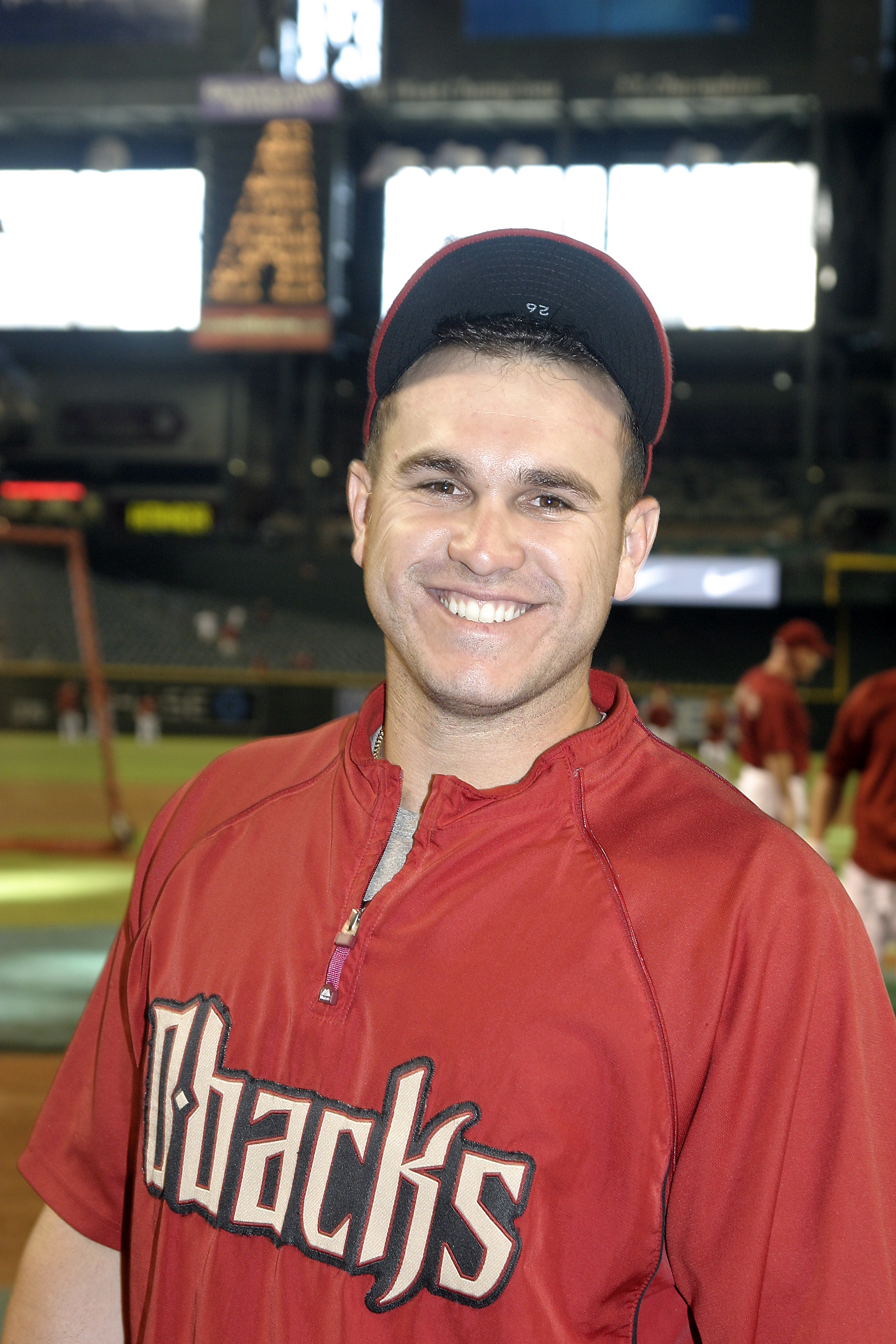
Montero with the Arizona Diamondbacks in 2010

Montero made his major league debut on September 6, 2006, against the Florida Marlins. He went hitless in his first game, as Aníbal Sánchez of the Marlins threw a no-hitter against the Diamondbacks. Montero played in a total of six games that year, recording a .250 batting average.

In 2007 and 2008, Montero platooned with Chris Snyder at the catching position for the D-Backs and batted a .224 average with 10 home runs in 2007 and batting .255 with five home runs in 2008.

Montero began the 2009 season slowly, hitting just three home runs and having just a .200 batting average through the first two months. However, when Snyder was put on the disabled list in June, Montero's playing time increased markedly and he finished the season with a career-high .294 batting average.

Montero caught Edwin Jackson's no-hitter on June 25, 2010. He finished the season with a .266 batting average and nine home runs.

In 2011, after hitting .272 with 10 home runs and 45 RBI, Montero was selected to his first All-Star Game. He also threw out 40% of baserunners trying to steal, a career high.

Montero was named to his second All-Star game in July 2014, replacing the injured Yadier Molina for the National League.

=== Chicago Cubs ===
Following the 2014 season, the Diamondbacks traded Montero to the Chicago Cubs for minor leaguers Jeferson Mejia and Zack Godley. Before a hand injury in mid-July, Montero had appeared in 73 games for the Cubs with 217 at bats. He had 10 home runs and 32 runs-batted-in with a batting average of .230. On August 30, 2015, Montero caught Jake Arrieta's no-hitter against the Los Angeles Dodgers.

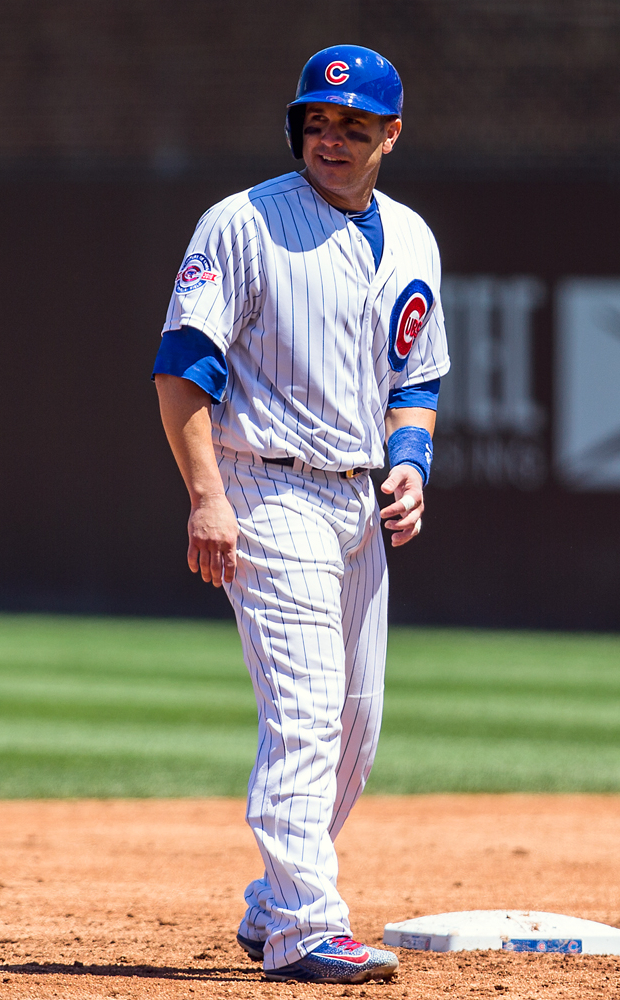
Miguel Montero on July 16, 2016, with the Cubs

During Game 1 of the 2016 NLCS, Montero hit a pinch-hit grand slam in the 8th inning to break a 3–3 tie and led the Cubs to an 8–4 victory over the Los Angeles Dodgers. It was the third pinch-hit grand slam in postseason history. Montero entered Game 7 of the 2016 World Series in the bottom of the 9th inning as a defensive replacement for Cubs backup catcher David Ross. In the top of the 10th inning, having batted only .091 (1-for-11) in the postseason to that point, Montero hit a single to left field which drove in Cubs first baseman Anthony Rizzo and improved the team's lead to 8–6. Since the Cleveland Indians only scored one run in the bottom of the 10th inning to make the score 8–7, Montero's RBI provided the game's decisive run and sealed the Cubs' victory. After the series, Montero expressed his disappointment in losing playing time to Willson Contreras and David Ross.

In a game on June 27, 2017, the Washington Nationals went seven-for-seven in stolen bases against Montero. After the game, he said that it was the fault of pitcher Jake Arrieta, who took too long to deliver his pitches and failed to hold the runners at their bases. The next day, the Cubs designated Montero for assignment. Montero apologized to Arrieta after the incident. It was reported this was done because management felt he was a disruption in the clubhouse; Anthony Rizzo considered Montero's comments to the media unprofessional.

=== Toronto Blue Jays ===
On July 3, 2017, Montero was traded to the Toronto Blue Jays for cash considerations or a player to be named later. He was placed on the disabled list with a groin strain on August 4. After a one-game rehab assignment with the Triple-A Buffalo Bisons, Montero was activated on August 16.

=== Washington Nationals ===
On February 1, 2018, Montero signed a minor league contract with the Washington Nationals. He was added to the major-league roster on March 27, 2018. After Montero appeared in four games for Washington and went 0-for-11 at the plate, the Nationals designated him for assignment on April 11, 2018. He was released on April 14, 2018.

On December 10, 2018, Montero announced his retirement.

== International career ==
He was selected Venezuela national baseball team at the 2013 World Baseball Classic.

== Personal life ==
Montero is married to Vanessa. Together, in 2017, the couple created the Miguel and Vanessa Montero Foundation, which aims to provide medical assistance to seriously ill children from Venezuela. On May 1, 2017, Montero and his wife both became United States citizens.

Montero grew up in Venezuela, the youngest of three children. He credits his parents with encouraging him to stay positive and always try.

== See also ==
- List of Major League Baseball players from Venezuela
