= Zach Kroenke =

American baseball player (born 1984)

- Pitcher
- Born: April 21, 1984 (age 42); Omaha, Nebraska, U.S.
- Batted: Right Threw: Left

MLB debut
- September 10, 2010, for the Arizona Diamondbacks

Last appearance
- June 8, 2011, for the Arizona Diamondbacks

MLB statistics
- Win–loss record: 1–1
- Earned run average: 7.59
- Strikeouts: 5
- Stats at Baseball Reference

Teams
- Arizona Diamondbacks (2010–2011)

Zachary B. Kroenke (born April 21, 1984) is an American former professional baseball pitcher. He played in Major League Baseball (MLB) for the Arizona Diamondbacks.

== Amateur baseball ==
=== High school ===
Zach went to Omaha Northwest High School. In his senior year he went 4–5 with a 3.42 ERA and led the state with 90 strike outs in 53 innings. Team One Baseball rated him in the top 200 players in the country. He chose to go to Nebraska after looking at Kansas and Winthrop.

=== Nebraska ===
Kroenke played at Nebraska for 3 years. He was one of the Big 12's best freshman pitchers in 2003. He made 10 starts in 15 appearances going 6–2 with a 2.72 ERA in 59.2 innings striking out 35 batters and walking 19. As a sophomore, he went 7–5 with a 3.03 ERA averaging 7 innings in 15 starts. He struck out 73 batters in 104 innings. After the 2004 season, he played collegiate summer baseball with the Harwich Mariners of the Cape Cod Baseball League. Zach helped the huskers reach the 2005 College World Series as a junior going 7–2 with a 2.78 ERA and a save in 20 appearances and 97 innings. He started in 16 games including 4 complete games. He struck out 88 and walking 28 opponents. He was drafted in the 5th round by the New York Yankees in the 2005 Major League Baseball draft.

=== Awards ===
- 2002 First-Team All-Nebraska
- 2003 Big 12 Pitcher of the Week (4/10/03)
- 2003 NCAA Lincoln Regional All-Tournament Team
- 2004 Big 12 Co-Pitcher of the Week (4/5/04)
- 2004 Second-Team All-Big 12
- 2005 Second-Team All-Big 12

== Professional baseball ==
=== New York Yankees ===
In 2005, he started his professional career appearing in 11 games with Class-A Staten Island and made one start for the Gulf Coast Yankees, going 1–2 with a 2.63 ERA with both teams. he was placed on the disabled list on August 28 with an injury to his right hand and missed the New York–Penn League playoffs.

Zach went 8–9 with a 4.11 ERA in 2006 pitching in 127 innings. He made four starts with the Tampa Yankees from April 10 to April 26 and was 0–3 with an 8.36 ERA before being transferred to Charleston. He appeared in 25 games with the Riverdogs, going 8–6 with a 3.58 ERA and ranked second on the club with 86 strikeouts.

He started 2007 with the Trenton Thunder in the Eastern League going 0–1 with a 9.42 ERA and 2 saves in 15 games. He was demoted back to Tampa where he went 2–2 with a 2.27 ERA and 33 strike outs in 29 games.

He started the 2008 season with the Trenton Thunder, where he went 6–0 with an ERA of 3.09. After a great performance there, he was promoted to the Triple-A Scranton/Wilkes Barre Yankees late in the year. he made only 4 appearances with a 1.80 ERA and 10 strikeouts in 10 innings.

On December 11, 2008, Kroenke was selected by the Florida Marlins in the Rule 5 draft. However, the Marlins returned him to the Yankees on March 16. Kroenke came back to the Scranton/Wilkes Barre Yankees for the 2009 season. He is 5–1 with a 1.03 ERA and 43.2 innings in 24 games.

=== Arizona Diamondbacks ===
On December 10, 2009, Kroenke was selected by the Arizona Diamondbacks in the Rule 5 draft. He did not make the team out of spring training, but he remained with the Diamondbacks with the Triple-A Reno Aces, as players selected in the Rule 5 draft and returned to their previous team twice are able to elect free agency.

Kroenke was promoted by the Diamondbacks on September 4, 2010. On October 6, 2012, Kroenke elected free agency.

=== Milwaukee Brewers ===
On November 15, 2012, Kroenke was signed to a minor league contract by the Milwaukee Brewers. He elected free agency on November 4, 2013.

=== Somerset Patriots ===
He signed with Somerset Patriots of The Atlantic League of Professional Baseball for the 2014 season.

=== Washington Nationals ===
Kroenke signed a minor league deal with the Washington Nationals on May 23, 2014. He became a free agent after the 2014 season.

== See also ==
- Rule 5 draft results
