= Barry Enright =

American baseball player and coach (born 1986)

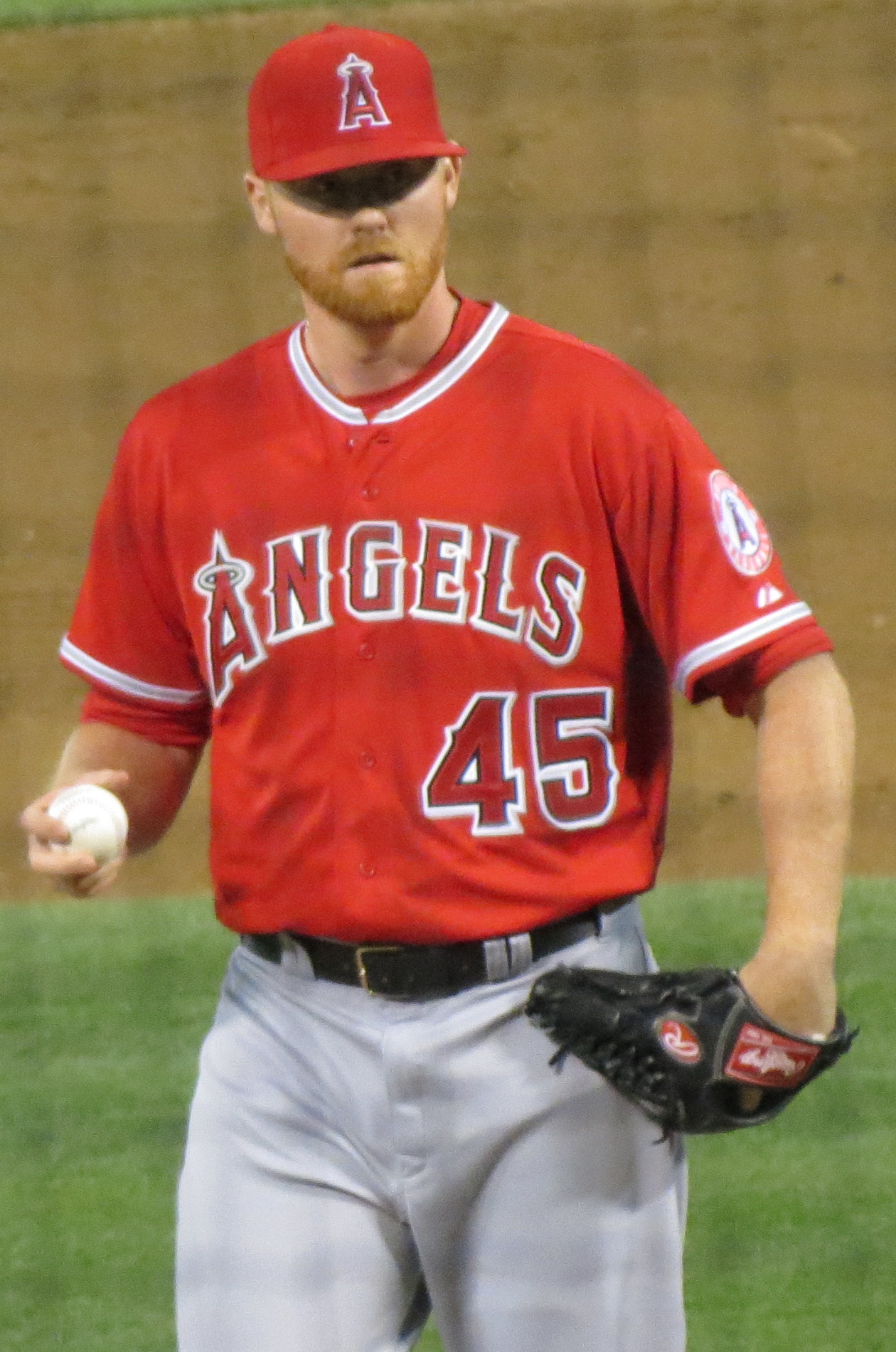
- Enright with the Angels in 2013

Texas A&M Aggies
- Pitcher / Coach
- Born: March 30, 1986 (age 40); Stockton, California, U.S.
- Batted: Right Threw: Right

MLB debut
- June 30, 2010, for the Arizona Diamondbacks

Last MLB appearance
- May 15, 2013, for the Los Angeles Angels of Anaheim

MLB statistics
- Win–loss record: 7–13
- Earned run average: 5.57
- Strikeouts: 76
- Stats at Baseball Reference

Teams
- As player: Arizona Diamondbacks (2010–2011); Los Angeles Angels of Anaheim (2012–2013); As coach: Arizona Diamondbacks (2022–2023); Los Angeles Angels (2024–2025)

Barry Ryan Enright (born March 30, 1986) is an American former professional baseball pitcher who is currently the pitching coach at Texas A&M University. He played in Major League Baseball (MLB) for the Arizona Diamondbacks and Los Angeles Angels of Anaheim. Enright attended St. Mary's High School in Stockton, California and Pepperdine University. He has also represented Great Britain internationally, including at the 2019 European Baseball Championship.

Enright is also a professional golfer who won his first-ever professional golf tournament, the TPC Champions Classic after defeating Sam Triplett, the son of former PGA Tour star Kirk Triplett, in a 6-hole playoff.

== Early life ==
Enright attended St. Mary's High School in Stockton, California, and then Pepperdine University, where he played college baseball for the Pepperdine Waves. In his first year at Pepperdine, 2005, he had a 10–1 win–loss record with a 4.62 earned run average (ERA) in 18 games started. The following year, he went 13–2 with a 4.05 ERA in 21 games (20 starts). After the 2006 season, he played collegiate summer baseball with the Brewster Whitecaps of the Cape Cod Baseball League. In 2007, he went 12–5 with a 1.99 ERA in 18 starts.

== Professional baseball career ==
=== Arizona Diamondbacks ===
The Arizona Diamondbacks selected Enright in the second round of the 2007 Major League Baseball draft. Enright began his professional career in 2007, splitting the season between three teams - the Yakima Bears (five games), the South Bend Silver Hawks (one game) and the Visalia Oaks (four games). He did not allow a single earned run in 15 combined innings of work, and he struck out 17 batters. In 2008, he pitched for the Oaks, going 12–8 with a 4.44 ERA in 29 starts. With the Mobile Bay Bears in 2009, Enright went 10–9 with a 3.98 ERA in 27 starts. He began 2010 with the Mobile Bay Bears, going 4–1 with a 2.88 ERA in 14 starts prior to his call-up to the major leagues. In 2011 while he was pitching for the Reno Aces, Enright threw a pitch behind Josh Donaldson of the Sacramento River Cats (who tagged Enright for a home run in the game earlier) and was promptly ejected along with Donaldson as the benches and bullpens cleared.

=== Los Angeles Angels of Anaheim ===
On July 24, 2012, Enright was traded to the Los Angeles Angels of Anaheim for cash considerations. On Tuesday, April 30, 2013, Enright surrendered a two-run walk-off home run to Oakland Athletics slugger Brandon Moss in the nineteenth inning. The home run, which ended the longest game in Angels history, took place over six and a half hours after the first pitch, which was thrown by the Athletics' Dan Straily 7:05PM PT the previous day. He was designated for assignment on May 16, 2013. He was outrighted to AAA on May 19, 2013. He elected free agency on November 4, 2013.

=== Later career ===
Enright signed a minor league deal with the Philadelphia Phillies on January 24, 2014. He was released in July after posting a 5.58 ERA in 19 starts for the Lehigh Valley IronPigs. He had been 1–7 with a 7.57 ERA in his last nine games started with the IronPigs. Enright signed a minor league deal with the Los Angeles Dodgers on July 28. He appeared in 7 games (5 starts) for the Triple–A Albuquerque Isotopes, where he was 0–4 with an 8.62 ERA. The Dodgers released him on April 5, 2015. On May 6, 2015, Enright signed with the Toros de Tijuana of the Mexican League.

On January 24, 2017, Enright signed a minor league contract with the San Diego Padres. On May 7, 2017, Enright was traded to the Colorado Rockies in exchange for cash considerations. In 12 starts for the Triple–A Albuquerque Isotopes, Enright struggled to a 5–4 record and 6.96 ERA with 47 strikeouts in 63 1/3 innings of work. He elected free agency following the season on November 6.

On February 18, 2018, Enright signed with the Tigres de Quintana Roo of the Mexican Baseball League. On July 16, Enright signed a minor league contract with the Arizona Diamondbacks organization. He made 8 appearances split between the Double–A Jackson Generals and Triple–A Reno Aces, accumulating a 5.12 ERA with 21 strikeouts across 31 2/3 innings pitched. Enright elected free agency following the season on November 2.

== International career ==
Enright was selected for the Great Britain national baseball team for the 2019 European Baseball Championship.

== Coaching career ==
=== Arizona Diamondbacks ===
Enright announced his retirement January 9, 2019, and worked as the pitching coach for the Hillsboro Hops, a minor league affiliate of the Arizona Diamondbacks in the Northwest League.

On November 30, 2021, Enright was hired to the Diamondbacks' major league staff to serve as the assistant major league pitching coach and minor league pitching coordinator.

=== Los Angeles Angels ===
On November 21, 2023, Enright was hired to be the pitching coach for the Los Angeles Angels under manager Ron Washington. On October 23, 2025, it was announced that Enright would not be retained under new manager Kurt Suzuki.

=== Athletics ===
On January 12, 2026, the Athletics hired Enright to serve as pitching coordinator and director of pitching in their player development department.

=== Texas A&M ===
On June 11, 2026, it was announced that the Texas A&M Aggies had hired Enright as the program's next pitching coach.

== Golfing career ==
As of 2020, Enright is trying his hand as a professional golfer. Enright played golf at Pepperdine, and resumed playing in late 2019. In May 2020, Enright beat out a pro field at the TPC Champions Classic in Scottsdale, Arizona.
