= John Ely (baseball) =

American baseball player (born 1986)

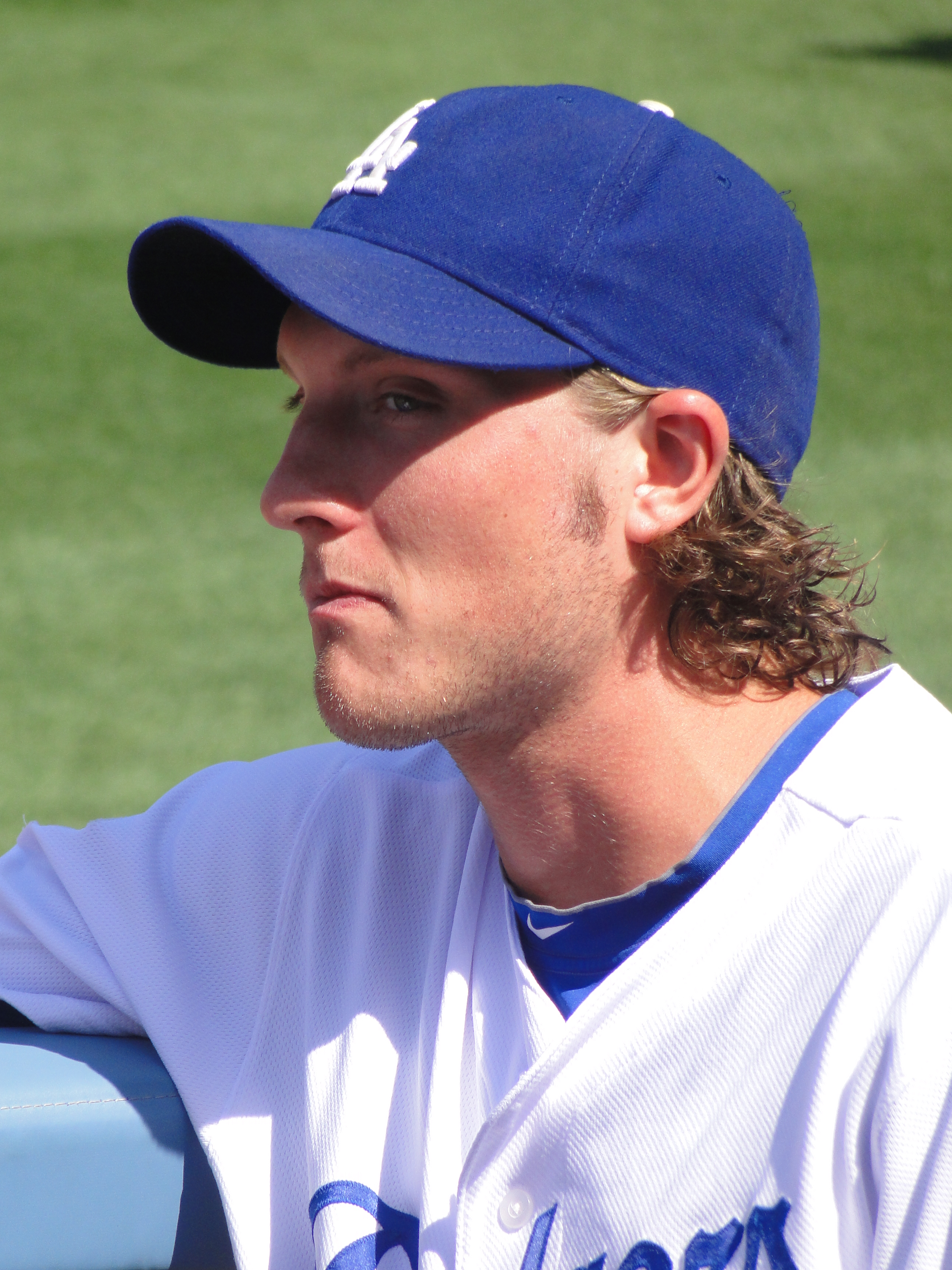
- Ely with the Los Angeles Dodgers
- Pitcher
- Born: May 13, 1986 (age 40); Harvey, Illinois, U.S.
- Batted: Right Threw: Right

MLB debut
- April 28, 2010, for the Los Angeles Dodgers

Last MLB appearance
- September 16, 2012, for the Los Angeles Dodgers

MLB statistics
- Win–loss record: 4–13
- Earned run average: 5.70
- Strikeouts: 92
- Stats at Baseball Reference

Teams
- Los Angeles Dodgers (2010–2012)

John Daniel Ely (born May 13, 1986) is an American former professional baseball pitcher. He played in Major League Baseball (MLB) for the Los Angeles Dodgers.

== Early years ==
Ely was born in Harvey, Illinois to Laura and Jack Ely. He attended Homewood-Flossmoor High School in Flossmoor, Illinois, where he compiled a 27–5 career record, including one perfect game. As a senior, he was selected as a first-team all-state pitcher in Illinois.

== Miami University ==
Ely attended Miami University. As a freshman in 2005, Ely led the Mid-American Conference in strikeouts (108 in 103 1/3 innings) and complete games (six) and tied for the conference lead in wins with ten. He won seven straight decisions during the months of April and May 2005 and compiled a 2.87 earned run average. He was also selected to the Collegiate Baseball/Louisville Slugger Freshman All-America Team.

As a sophomore in 2006, Ely was selected as a first-team All-Mid-American Conference player after striking out 80 batters in 75 2/3 innings. He struck out a career-high 14 batters against Birmingham-Southern on March 5, 2006.

Ely played for the Wareham Gatemen of the Cape Cod Baseball League during the summer of 2006.

== Professional career ==
=== Chicago White Sox ===
Ely was drafted by the Chicago White Sox in the third round of the 2007 MLB draft. He began his professional career with the Great Falls White Sox in the Pioneer League. He appeared in 13 games for Great Falls, compiling a 6–1 record and a 3.86 ERA, and striking out 56 batters in 56 innings pitched. In 2008, he played with the Winston-Salem Warthogs in the Carolina League, appearing in 27 games, compiling a 10–12 record, 4.71 ERA, and 134 strikeouts in 145 1/3 innings pitched.

In 2009 with the Birmingham Barons of the Southern League he was 14–2 with a 2.82 ERA in 27 starts with 125 strikeouts in 156-1/3 inning pitched.

=== Los Angeles Dodgers ===
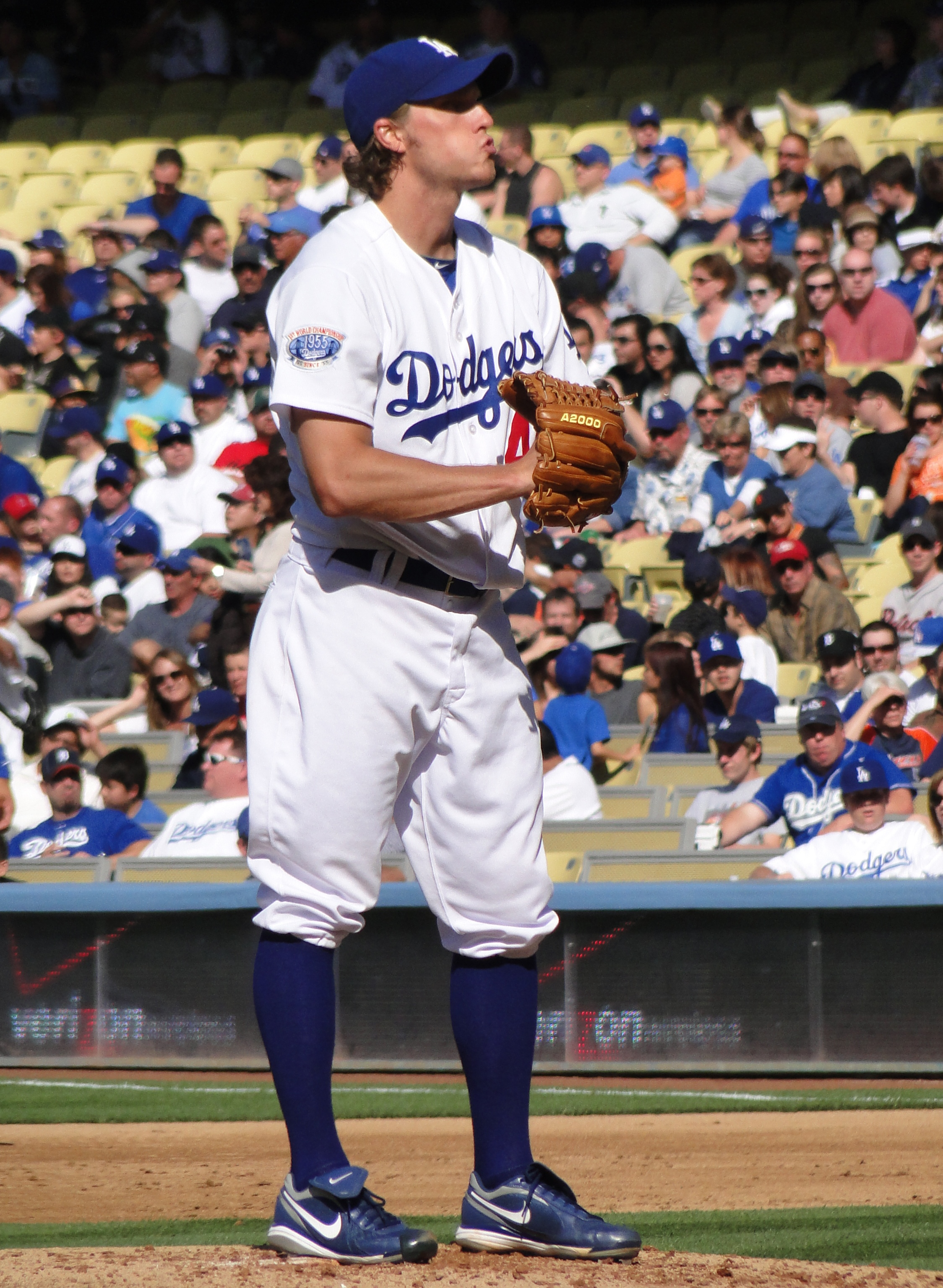
Ely pitching at Dodger Stadium, May 2010

Prior to the 2010 season, Ely was traded to the Los Angeles Dodgers (along with Jon Link) for outfielder Juan Pierre. He was assigned to the starting rotation for the AAA Albuquerque Isotopes. He compiled a 2–1 record in three starts for the Isotopes, striking out 12 batters in 18 innings with a 3.00 ERA.

On April 28, 2010, Ely received his first Major League callup when he was added to the Dodgers roster and started for the team against the New York Mets. He allowed five runs in six innings in his debut. In his second career start, on May 6, Ely allowed only four hits and one run in 6 2/3 innings against the Milwaukee Brewers. After Ely's performance against the Brewers, the Chicago Sun-Times wrote that Ely was "a genuine pride of the South Side" and "a human wrecking ball" for the Dodgers.

In his third start, on May 11, 2010, Ely was credited with his first win, allowing two runs, six hits and no walks and striking out six in six innings against the Arizona Diamondbacks. Ely was credited with his second win a week later against the Houston Astros. Ely threw seven innings, allowing five hits and only two runs. He struck out eight and walked no batters. Ely was the first Dodger to do so since Sandy Koufax. After winning his third straight decision against the Detroit Tigers on May 22, 2010, Dodgers Manager Joe Torre said, "He's certainly, as Yogi would say, making himself necessary."

After winning three of his first four decisions, Ely struggled the rest of the way losing nine of his last ten decisions. He finished the season with a record of 4–10 and an ERA of 5.49. He also developed command problems, walking 14 in his last three starts after walking just four in his first five starts.

He made one start for the Dodgers on April 10, 2011 against the San Diego Padres, filling in for the injured Jon Garland and appeared in four other games out of the bullpen. Most of his season was spent with the AAA Albuquerque Isotopes, where he made 25 starts and finished 7–8 with a 5.99 ERA. His best start of the season was when he came within one out of throwing a no-hitter in a 7 inning game against the Iowa Cubs on April 20. On November 18, 2011 he was outrighted to the minors and removed from the 40-man roster.

In 2012 with Albuquerque he was 14–7 with a 3.20 ERA in 27 games and was selected to the Pacific Coast League mid-season All-Star team and the post-season All-PCL team. He was also named the PCL Pitcher of the Year after leading the league in wins, ERA and strikeouts (165). On September 1, the Dodgers purchased his contract from the Isotopes and called him back up to the majors. On September 27, the Dodgers selected Ely as the team's "Minor League Pitcher of the Year." He only appeared in two games for the Dodgers, taking the loss in two extra inning games, with an ERA of 20.25.

=== Houston Astros ===
Ely was traded to the Houston Astros on December 19, 2012 for Rob Rasmussen. Assigned to the Oklahoma City RedHawks of the Class AAA Pacific Coast League, Ely suffered an injury after one appearance, requiring Tommy John surgery. He was released on November 19, 2013.

=== Boston Red Sox ===
On December 13, 2013, the Boston Red Sox signed Ely to a minor league deal, that included a spring training invitation.

=== Milwaukee Brewers ===
Ely signed a minor league contract with the Milwaukee Brewers on November 19, 2014. He was released on July 23, 2015.

=== Sioux City Explorers ===
Ely signed with the Sioux City Explorers of the American Association of Independent Professional Baseball following his release. He became a free agent after the season.

== Coaching career ==
Ely Joined the Chicago White Sox organization as a minor league pitching coach for the Great Falls Voyagers of the Pioneer League in 2017. He was named pitching coach for the Winston-Salem Dash for the 2023 season. He was named pitching coach for the Birmingham Barons for the 2024 season.
