= Konrad Schmidt =

American baseball player (born 1984)

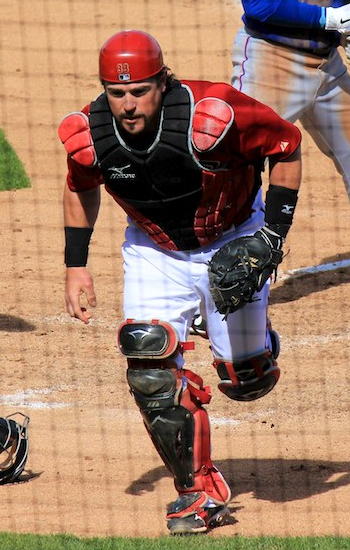
- Schmidt with the Arizona Diamondbacks
- Catcher
- Born: August 2, 1984 (age 41); Santa Rosa, California, U.S.
- Batted: Right Threw: Right

MLB debut
- September 13, 2010, for the Arizona Diamondbacks

Last MLB appearance
- October 1, 2012, for the Arizona Diamondbacks

MLB statistics
- Batting average: .067
- Home runs: 0
- Runs batted in: 2
- Stats at Baseball Reference

Teams
- Arizona Diamondbacks (2010, 2012)

Konrad Albert Schmidt (born August 2, 1984) is an American former professional baseball catcher. He played in Major League Baseball (MLB) for the Arizona Diamondbacks in 2010 and 2012.

== Career ==
=== Amateur ===
Schmidt attended Petaluma High School in Petaluma, California. He attended Santa Rosa Junior College after high school. While at SRJC, the Bearcubs won a CA Juco State Championship. He then went to the University of Arizona, where he played for the Arizona Wildcats baseball team, but transferred to the University of Nevada, Reno, where he played for the Nevada Wolf Pack baseball team.

=== Arizona Diamondbacks ===
Schmidt was undrafted out of college, and signed with the Arizona Diamondbacks on May 28, 2007. He made his professional debut with the Low-A Yakima Bears. In 2008, Schmidt made 102 appearances split between the Single-A South Bend Silver Hawks and High-A Visalia Rawhide, batting a cumulative .288/.340/.372 with three home runs, 37 RBI, and three stolen bases.

Schmidt split the 2009 campaign between Visalia and the Triple-A Reno Aces, slashing a combined .309/.362/.447 with nine home runs and 54 RBI across 111 total appearances. He began the 2010 season with the Double-A Mobile BayBears, batting .315/.373/.490 with 11 home runs, 65 RBI, and seven stolen bases across 107 appearances.

On September 13, 2010, Schmidt was selected to the 40-man roster and promoted to the major leagues for the first time. He made four appearances for the Diamondbacks during his rookie campaign, going 1-for-8 (.125) with one walk.

Schmidt spent the entirety of the 2011 season with Triple-A Reno, playing in 92 games and batting .280/.330/.445 with nine home runs and 45 RBI. He made four appearances for the Diamondbacks in 2012, going 0-for-7 with two RBI and one walk.

=== Cincinnati Reds ===
On November 1, 2012, Schmidt was claimed off waivers by the Texas Rangers. On December 14, he was removed from the 40-man roster and sent outright to the Triple-A Round Rock Express. Schmidt was released by the Rangers prior to the start of the season on March 23, 2013.

Schmidt signed a minor league contract with Cincinnati Reds on March 27, 2013. He made 28 appearances for the Triple-A Louisville Bats, hitting .187/.219/.231 with one home run and five RBI. Schmidt was released by the Reds organization on June 13.
