= Sam Demel =

American baseball player (born 1985)

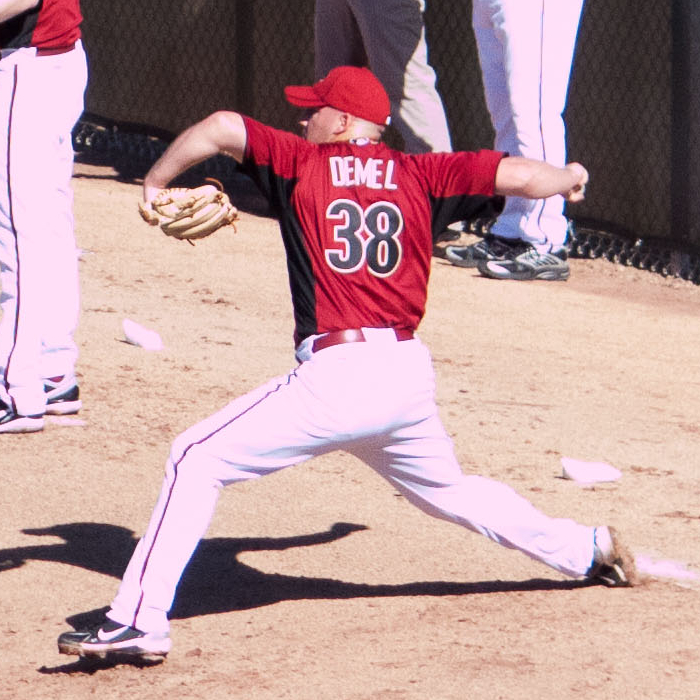
- Demel with the Arizona Diamondbacks
- Pitcher
- Born: October 23, 1985 (age 40); Channelview, Texas, U.S.
- Batted: Right Threw: Right

MLB debut
- June 16, 2010, for the Arizona Diamondbacks

Last MLB appearance
- August 21, 2012, for the Arizona Diamondbacks

MLB statistics
- Win–loss record: 4–4
- Earned run average: 4.95
- Strikeouts: 48
- Stats at Baseball Reference

Teams
- Arizona Diamondbacks (2010–2012)

Samuel Vincent Demel (born October 23, 1985) is an American former Major League Baseball (MLB) pitcher who played for the Arizona Diamondbacks from 2010 to 2012.

== Career ==
=== College ===
Demel attended Texas Christian University, where he was a member of the 2005 Conference USA All-Tournament Team and the 2006 First All-Mountain West Conference team. He pitched for the Falmouth Commodores of the prestigious Cape Cod Baseball League in 2005 and 2006, earning league All-Star honors in 2006.

=== Draft and minor leagues ===
Demel was drafted in the 35th round of the 2004 Major League Baseball draft by the Texas Rangers, but opted to attend college instead. He was again drafted by the Oakland Athletics in the third round of the 2007 Major League Baseball draft. Demel would play in spring training for the A's but would not make the team and go back to the minors.

In 2007, Demel pitched for Kane County and Stockton in Class A and got to a 0–1 record and a 4.63 ERA. After playing for Stockton again in 2008 with a 5–2 record with a 3.36, he would be pulled up the Double-A and play for the Midland RockHounds, and in the same year be pulled up to Triple-A and play for the Sacramento River Cats. Demel would pitch again for Sacramento in 2009 and get to a 2–0 record with a 1.26 ERA until his was called up.

=== Arizona Diamondbacks ===
Demel began the 2010 season in Sacramento but on June 15, 2010, he was traded to the Arizona Diamondbacks for Conor Jackson. He was called up the next day, replacing César Valdez on the major league roster. On his rookie debut against the Boston Red Sox, Demel pitched one inning and allowed no hits or walks. Demel would record his first major league win on August 9, 2010, in a game against the Milwaukee Brewers and his first save the next day. Demel would finish his rookie season with a 2–1 record and a 5.35 ERA.

On Opening Day of 2011, Demel would get his third win of his career he would pitch just one inning and allow one hit and no earned runs. Demel improved from his rookie season, pitching with a 4.21 ERA, 15 strikeouts and a record of 2-2. Demel would give up more walks than his rookie year.

Demel would pitch in his first game of 2012 on August 21. He would pitch one complete inning giving up 2 hits 1 walk and 1 earned run, and would end up receiving the loss for the game.

=== Houston Astros/New York Yankees ===
On November 1, 2012, Demel was claimed off waivers by the Houston Astros from the Diamondbacks. At the end of spring training in 2013, the New York Yankees claimed Demel from the Astros, and then outrighted him to the minor leagues. He elected free agency on November 4, 2013.

=== Los Angeles Dodgers ===
On December 12, 2013, he signed a minor league contract with the Los Angeles Dodgers and was assigned to the AAA Albuquerque Isotopes. He appeared in 21 games for the Isotopes, including 6 starts and was 1–2 with a 6.41 ERA. He left a game on June 20 with an arm injury and spent the rest of the season on the disabled list. He became a free agent after the 2014 season.
