= Esmerling Vásquez =

Dominican baseball player (born 1983)

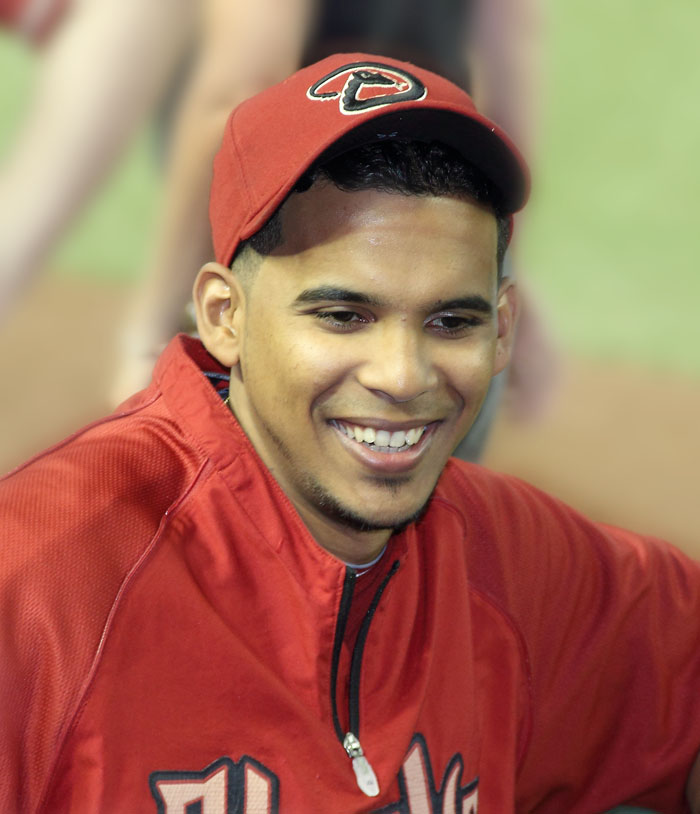
- Vásquez with the Arizona Diamondbacks
- Pitcher
- Born: November 7, 1983 (age 42); Tenares, Dominican Republic
- Batted: Right Threw: Right

Professional debut
- MLB: April 26, 2009, for the Arizona Diamondbacks
- CPBL: March 23, 2014, for the EDA Rhinos
- NPB: March 29, 2015, for the Saitama Seibu Lions

Last appearance
- MLB: October 1, 2012, for the Arizona Diamondbacks
- CPBL: July 17, 2014, for the EDA Rhinos
- NPB: August 28, 2016, for the Saitama Seibu Lions

MLB statistics
- Win–loss record: 5–12
- Earned run average: 4.86
- Strikeouts: 134

CPBL statistics
- Win–loss record: 1–1
- Earned run average: 2.84
- Strikeouts: 35

NPB statistics
- Win–loss record: 3–1
- Earned run average: 4.24
- Strikeouts: 34
- Stats at Baseball Reference

Teams
- Arizona Diamondbacks (2009–2011); Minnesota Twins (2012); EDA Rhinos (2014); Saitama Seibu Lions (2015–2016)

Esmerling de Jesús Vásquez (born November 7, 1983) is a Dominican former professional baseball pitcher. He played in Major League Baseball (MLB) for the Arizona Diamondbacks and Minnesota Twins and in Nippon Professional Baseball (NPB) for the Saitama Seibu Lions.

== Career ==
=== Arizona Diamondbacks ===
Vásquez signed as an undrafted free agent in 2003 by the Arizona Diamondbacks.

Vásquez played for the Double–A Mobile BayBears in 2007. He started in all 29 games he played in and went 10–6 with a 2.99 ERA. Following the season, the Diamondbacks named Vásquez as their minor league pitcher of the year. On November 20, 2007, the Diamondbacks added Vásquez to their 40-man roster to protect him from the Rule 5 draft.

Vásquez was promoted to the major leagues for the first time on April 26, 2009, and made his major league debut later that day.

Vásquez was demoted to the Triple–A Reno Aces on April 17, 2010, to make room for Kris Benson but was recalled 2 days later after Conor Jackson suffered an injury. On May 31, Vásquez committed a balk in the bottom of the ninth against the Dodgers, allowing Casey Blake to score the winning run. The event was known as a "balk-off".

In his career with the Diamondbacks, Vásquez went 5–10 with a 4.66 ERA in 141 games with a 1.496 WHIP.

=== Minnesota Twins ===
Vásquez was claimed off waivers by the Minnesota Twins on September 27, 2011. He did not pitch for the Twins that year. Vásquez spent most of 2012 with Triple-A Rochester, where he went 9–6 with a 2.78 ERA with 98 strikeouts in 31 games, 8 of them starts. He was promoted to the major leagues on September 1, 2012, and went 0–2 with a 5.68 with 14 strikeouts in 6 starts.

On November 5, 2012, Vásquez re-signed with Minnesota on a minor league contract. He began the 2013 season on the injured list, and did not make an appearance before he was released by the Twins organization on June 23, 2013.

=== EDA Rhinos ===
Vásquez signed with the EDA Rhinos of the Chinese Professional Baseball League for the 2014 season.

=== Saitama Seibu Lions ===
On November 14, 2014, Vásquez signed with the Saitama Seibu Lions of Nippon Professional Baseball. He made 34 appearances for Seibu in 2015, compiling a 3–1 record and 3.63 ERA with 21 strikeouts across 34 2/3 innings pitched. Vásquez pitched in 19 contests for the Lions in 2016, working to a 5.51 ERA with 13 strikeouts over 16 1/3 innings of work.

=== Algodoneros de Unión Laguna ===
On July 19, 2018, Vásquez signed with the Algodoneros de Unión Laguna of the Mexican League. In 16 appearances for the team, he recorded a 2.57 ERA with 12 strikeouts across 14 innings.

=== Texas Rangers ===
On March 10, 2019, Vásquez signed a minor league contract with the Texas Rangers organization. In 12 games (8 starts) split between the Double–A Frisco RoughRiders and Triple–A Nashville Sounds, he accumulated a 5.86 ERA with 17 strikeouts across 35 1/3 innings pitched. Vásquez became a free agent following the season on November 4.

On March 14, 2020, Vásquez re-signed with the Rangers on a new minor league contract. He did not play in a game in 2020 due to the cancellation of the minor league season because of the COVID-19 pandemic. Vásquez became a free agent on November 2.
