= Leo Rosales =

American baseball player (born 1981)

- Pitcher
- Born: May 28, 1981 (age 44); Los Angeles, California, U.S.
- Batted: Right Threw: Right

MLB debut
- June 15, 2008, for the Arizona Diamondbacks

Last MLB appearance
- October 3, 2010, for the Arizona Diamondbacks

MLB statistics
- Win–loss record: 5-2
- Earned run average: 5.01
- Strikeouts: 61
- Stats at Baseball Reference

Teams
- Arizona Diamondbacks (2008–2010)

Leonel Rosales (born May 28, 1981) is a former professional baseball pitcher. He played in Major League Baseball for the Arizona Diamondbacks and later pitched in the Mexican Baseball League and the Atlantic League.

== Career ==
Before and during his time at California State University, Northridge Rosales played with the Boyle Heights Giants traveling baseball team est. 1988, and the East L.A. Dodgers, a SCC baseball team, his number 11 was retired on December 15, 2008.

Rosales graduated from Reseda High School in 1999. Rosales attended California State University, Northridge and was drafted by the San Diego Padres in the 20th round (581st overall) of the 2003 Major League Baseball draft. He spent 4½ seasons in the Padres system. On July 27, 2007, he was acquired by the Arizona Diamondbacks for outfielder Scott Hairston. He had been out with a right hand injury since June 5, 2007, when the Arizona Diamondbacks acquired him.

He played in the winter of 2007 in the Mexican Pacific League with the Naranjeros de Hermosillo.

Rosales made his Major League debut on June 15, 2008, for the Diamondbacks. In 3 seasons at the pro level, Rosales went 5–2 with a 5.01 ERA in 76 appearances.

After not pitching for any teams in 2011, Rosales returned to baseball in 2012 with the Acereros de Monclova of the Mexican League. He later pitched for the Camden Riversharks of the Atlantic League. On September 18, he was traded to the Long Island Ducks for Reid Gorecki. That year he pitched a combined 8–3 with a 3.03 ERA in 68 appearances.

He was re-signed by Long Island for the 2013 season. He was elected as an All-Star for the Liberty Division in the Atlantic League All-Star Game. At the break he was 2–2 with a 1.95 ERA in 28 appearances and 15 saves.

On May 27, 2014, Rosales signed with the Leones de Yucatán of the Mexican Baseball League.

On July 1, 2015, Rosales was traded to the Rieleros de Aguascalientes.

On December 14, 2015, Rosales was traded to the Leones de Yucatán. He became a free agent after the 2015 season.

On March 30, 2017, Rosales signed back with the Leones de Yucatán. He was traded to the Vaqueros Unión Laguna on June 20, 2017.

Rosales announced his retirement from professional baseball on January 10, 2018.

In 2025, he was hired as an assistant pitching coach for the ACL Padres the rookie level affiliate of the San Diego Padres.
