= Conor Jackson =

American baseball player (born 1982)

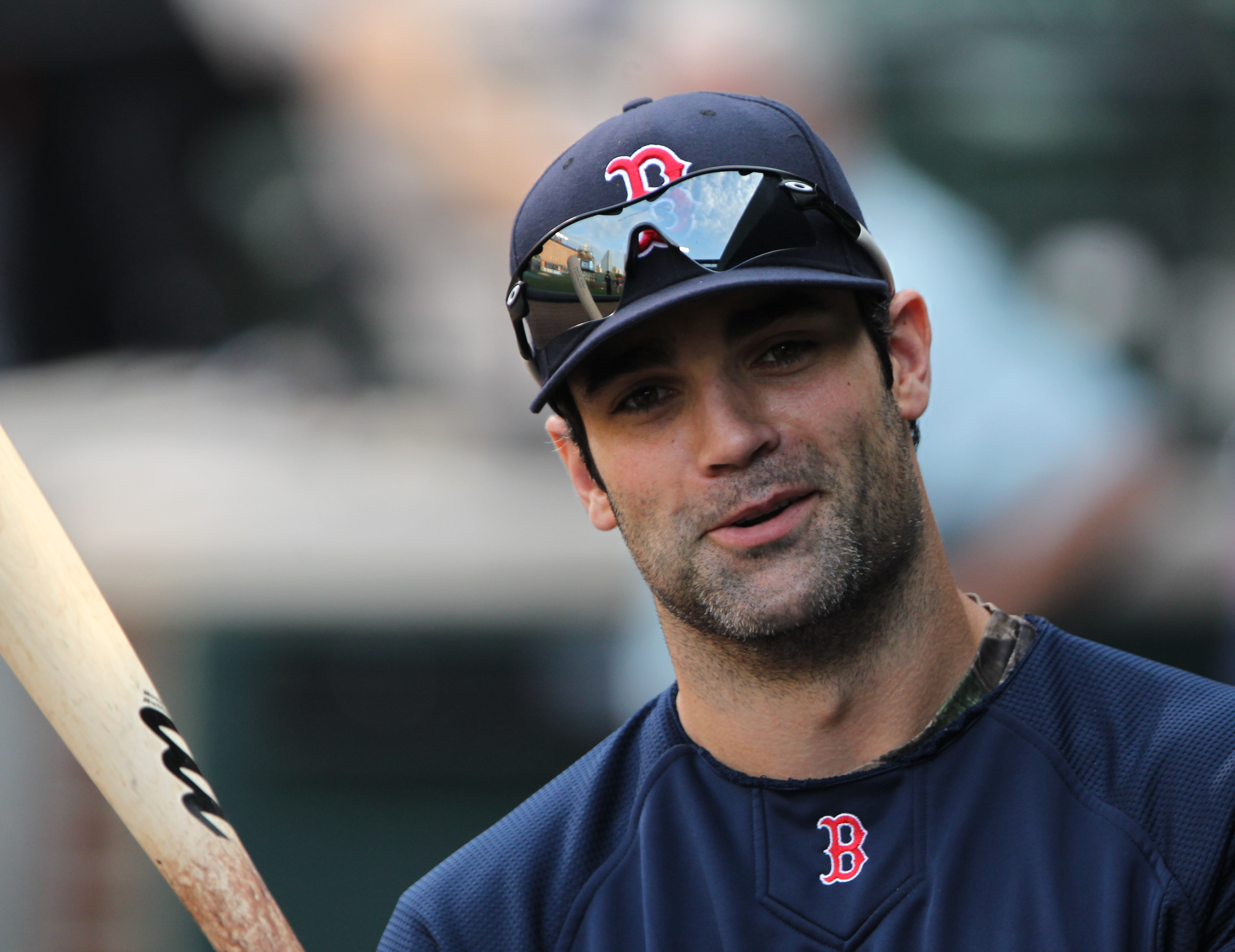
- Jackson with the Boston Red Sox
- First baseman / Left fielder
- Born: May 7, 1982 (age 44); Austin, Texas, U.S.
- Batted: Right Threw: Right

MLB debut
- July 28, 2005, for the Arizona Diamondbacks

Last MLB appearance
- September 25, 2011, for the Boston Red Sox

MLB statistics
- Batting average: .271
- Home runs: 52
- Runs batted in: 295
- Stats at Baseball Reference

Teams
- Arizona Diamondbacks (2005–2010); Oakland Athletics (2010–2011); Boston Red Sox (2011)

Conor Sims Jackson (born May 7, 1982) is an American former professional baseball first baseman and left fielder. He played in Major League Baseball (MLB) between 2005 and 2011 for the Arizona Diamondbacks, Oakland Athletics, and Boston Red Sox. His father is actor John M. Jackson.

== College and minor leagues ==
After graduating from El Camino Real High School in Woodland Hills, California in 2000, Jackson had a stellar collegiate career at the University of California (Berkeley) as a third baseman. In 2001, he played collegiate summer baseball in the Cape Cod Baseball League for the Bourne Braves. He developed a reputation for a patient batting eye and led the Pac-10 with a .538 OBP in 2003. Jackson was drafted in the first round (19th overall) of the 2003 MLB amateur draft.

Jackson switched to the outfield shortly after being drafted. In his initial debut with Yakima of the short-season Northwest League, he batted .319 with a league record 35 doubles. After his minor league debut, Jackson successfully climbed the minor league ladder. After fielding only .964 in the outfield in the minors, he was moved to first base, where his defensive struggles continued.

== Major leagues ==
=== Arizona Diamondbacks (2005–2010) ===
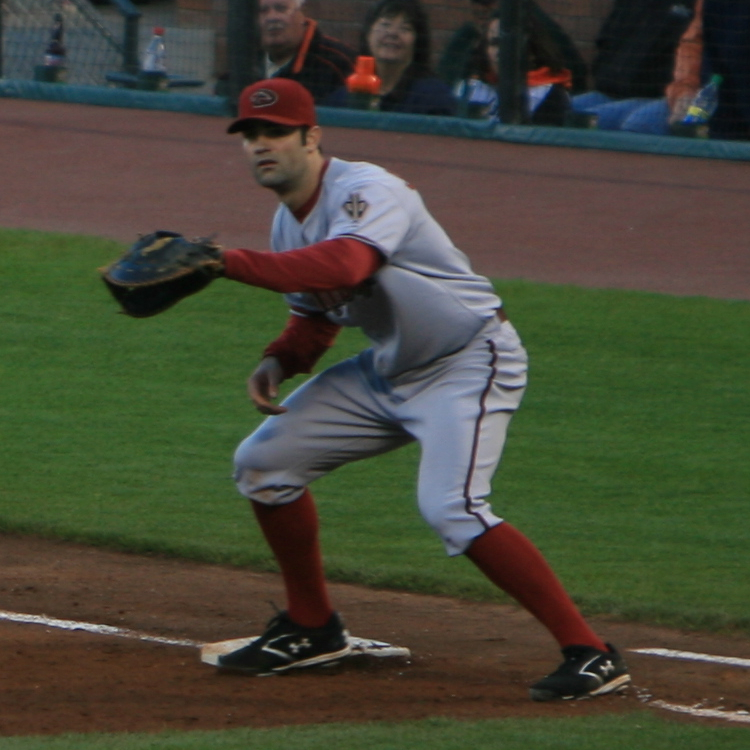
Jackson playing for the Arizona Diamondbacks in 2007

He received his first taste of the majors in 2005 (debuting July 28, 2005, in Wrigley Field), where he batted .200/.303/.306 with 2 home runs in 85 at bats. In 2006 he claimed the Diamondbacks' starting first base job. He finished the season with a .291 average with 15 home runs in 140 games. Jackson played a vast majority of first base for the D-Backs.

Although he missed some time in 2007 due to injury, he wound up hitting 15 home runs with 60 RBIs in 130 games, he hit .235 in 17 at bats in the postseason.

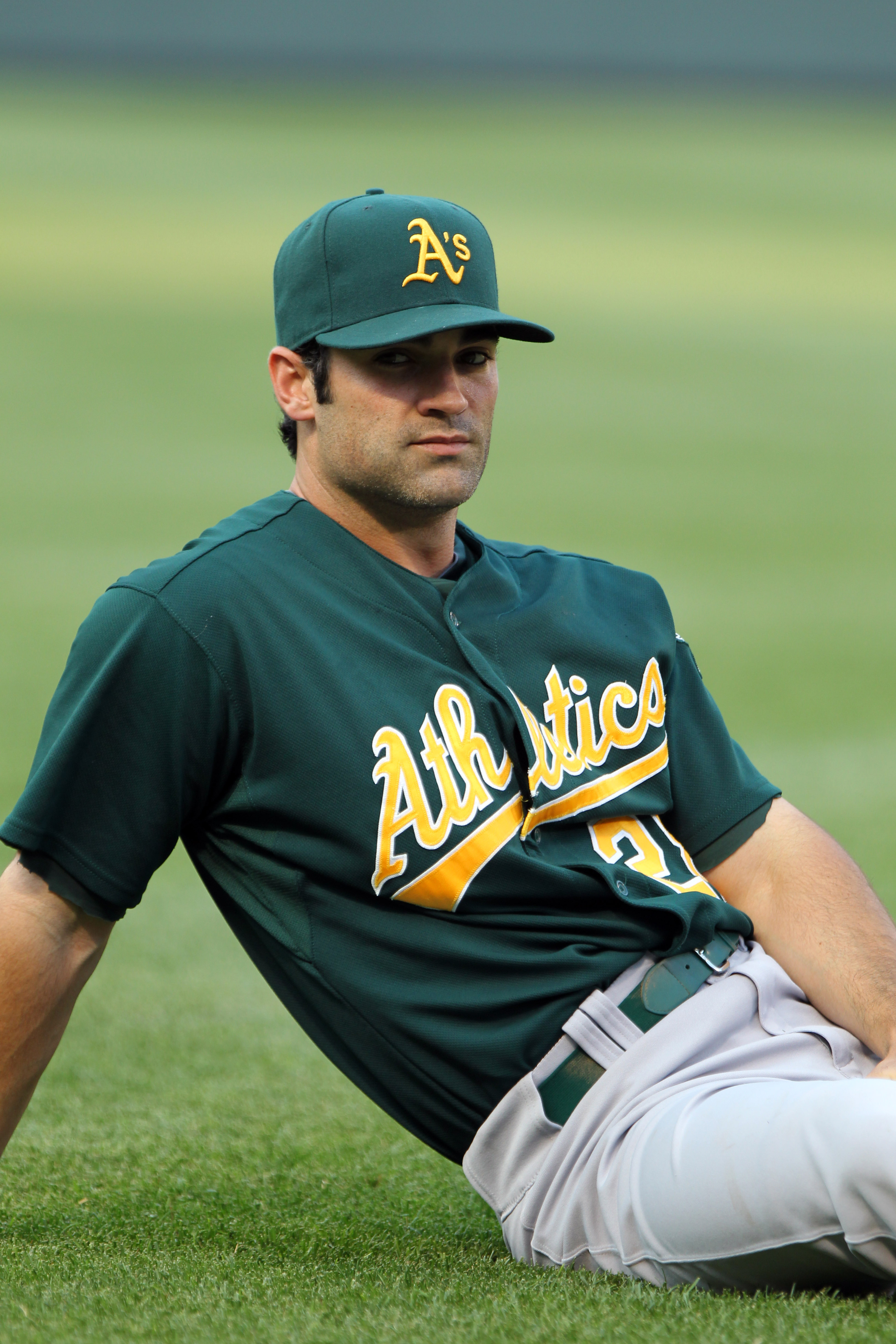
Jackson during his tenure with the Oakland Athletics in 2011

In 2008, Jackson started the season with a hot bat as the Diamondbacks took an early lead in the NL West. Conor had the opportunity to hit for the cycle in a game against San Diego on April 18. Facing Greg Maddux in his last at bat, Jackson hit a deep line drive to center field, and instead of stopping at second base for the double and the cycle, he continued on to third base for his second triple of the game. It would have been Jackson's first career cycle. He finished the game with four hits, tying his career high, and was later named National League Player of the Week for his 12 hits, 10 runs, 10 RBIs, and three home runs from April 14 through April 20. Jackson set career highs in Average (.300), plate appearances (612), at bats (540), runs (87) and stolen bases (10) while splitting the season between playing left field and first base.

His 2009 season was stalled in May when he contracted Valley Fever and lost approximately 35 pounds during the illness (per his interview on Chronicle Live 6/21/10). "I'm tired. I'm fatigued. Some days I feel like I'm able to do stuff, and I do stuff. I sleep 12, 13 hours and I'm exhausted." Jackson would play just 30 games in 2009 batting a .182 batting average with 1 home run and 14 RBI.

In 2010, he was hitting .238 for the Diamondbacks before being traded to the A's.

=== Oakland Athletics (2010–2011) ===
On June 15, 2010, Jackson was traded with cash considerations to the Oakland Athletics for pitcher Sam Demel. After the demotion of Daric Barton in spring 2011, Jackson saw the majority of his starts at first base until the call-up of trade acquisition Brandon Allen. Jackson would only play 18 games for the A's that year and only 60 for the entire season, finishing with a .236 batting average, two home runs, and 16 RBI.

He would play in 102 games for the Athletics in 2011 before being traded to the Boston Red Sox.

=== Boston Red Sox (2011) ===
On August 31, 2011, Jackson was traded to the Boston Red Sox for a minor league player. On September 19, he hit his first home run in a Red Sox uniform, a grand slam over the "Green Monster" at Fenway Park, in an 18–9 rout of the Baltimore Orioles. That would be his final home run of the season as Jackson only played 12 games with Boston. He would finish that year with a .244 batting average, five home runs, and 43 RBI.

=== Minor league deals and retirement ===
On February 6, 2012, Jackson signed a minor league deal with the Texas Rangers. He was released on March 26.

On March 31, 2012, Jackson signed a minor league deal with the Chicago White Sox, and was assigned to Triple-A Charlotte.

On December 5, 2012, Jackson was signed to a minor league deal with the Baltimore Orioles that included a spring training invitation. He later announced his retirement on April 14, 2013.
