= Carlos Rosa =

Dominican baseball player (born 1984)

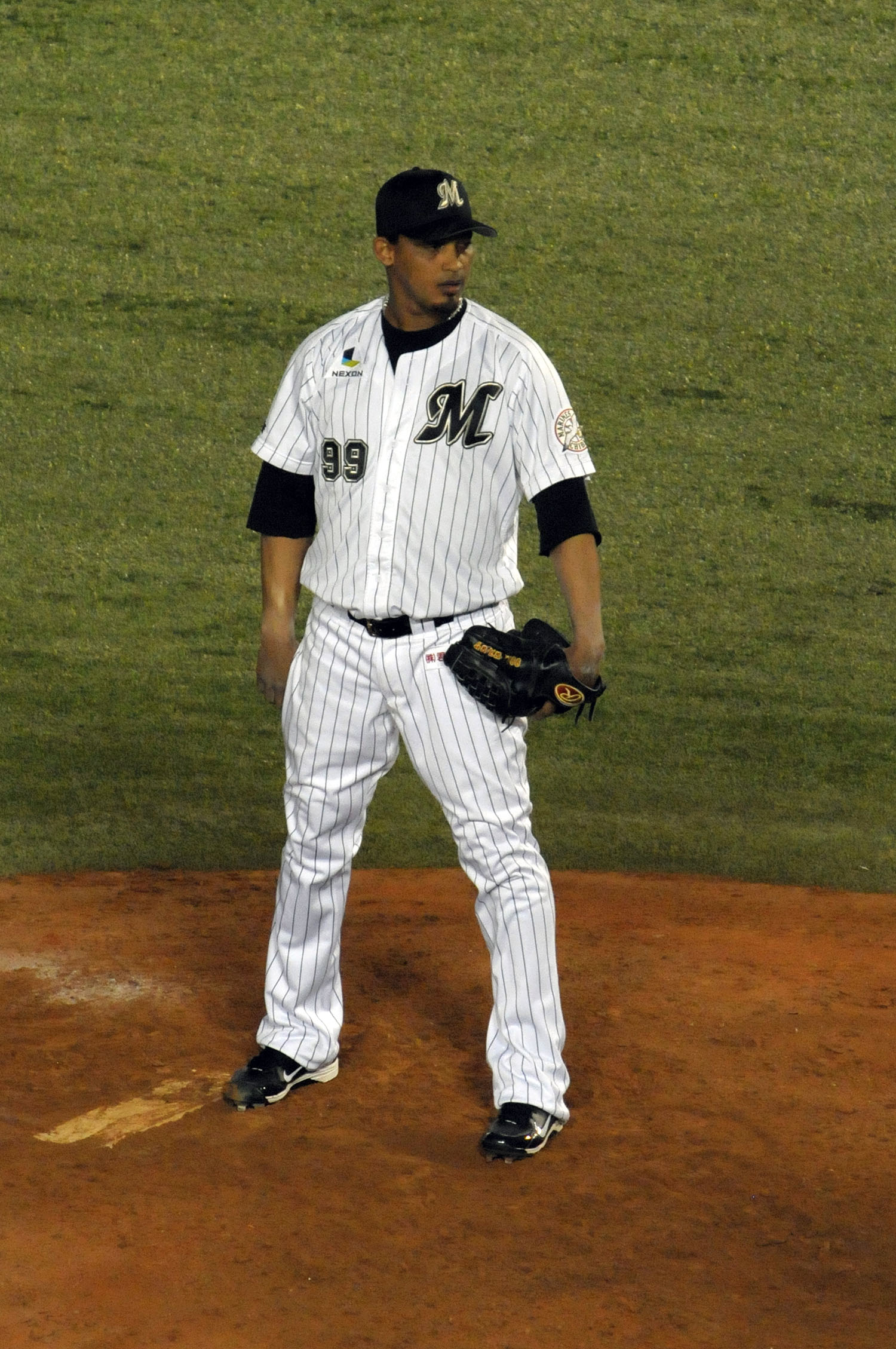
- Rosa with the Chiba Lotte Marines
- Pitcher
- Born: September 21, 1984 (age 41); San Francisco de Macoris, Dominican Republic
- Batted: Right Threw: Right

MLB debut
- June 14, 2008, for the Kansas City Royals

Last MLB appearance
- October 1, 2010, for the Arizona Diamondbacks

MLB statistics
- Win–loss record: 0–2
- Earned run average: 3.97
- Strikeouts: 16

NPB statistics
- Win–loss record: 5–13
- Earned run average: 2.96
- Strikeouts: 157
- Stats at Baseball Reference

Teams
- Kansas City Royals (2008–2009); Arizona Diamondbacks (2010); Chiba Lotte Marines (2011–2015)

Carlos Rosa Mayi (born September 21, 1984) is a Dominican former professional baseball pitcher. He played in Major League Baseball (MLB) for the Kansas City Royals and Arizona Diamondbacks, and in Nippon Professional Baseball (NPB) for the Chiba Lotte Marines.

== Career ==
=== Kansas City Royals ===
Rosa began the 2008 season in Double-A with the Northwest Arkansas Naturals, where he led the Texas League in ERA and WHIP. He was promoted to the Triple-A Omaha Royals in May. Rosa made his Major League Baseball debut against the Arizona Diamondbacks on June 14, 2008. He also got his first strikeout on that day.

=== Arizona Diamondbacks ===
Rosa was traded to the Arizona Diamondbacks on May 1, 2010, in exchange for minor league shortstop Rey Navarro.

=== Chiba Lotte Marines ===
Rosa spent the 2011 to 2015 seasons with the Chiba Lotte Marines of Nippon Professional Baseball. In 204 total appearances for the Marines, Rosa compiled a 5–13 record and 2.96 ERA with 157 strikeouts and one save over 207 innings of work.

=== Guerreros de Oaxaca ===
On April 17, 2016, Rosa signed with the Guerreros de Oaxaca of the Mexican League. In four appearances for Oaxaca, he pitched to a 1–1 record and 6.23 ERA with three strikeouts across 4 1/3 innings pitched. Rosa was released by the Guerreros on April 28.
