= 2010 Los Angeles Dodgers season =

2010 Los Angeles Dodgers
- League: National League
- Division: West
- Ballpark: Dodger Stadium
- City: Los Angeles, California
- Record: 80–82 (.494)
- Divisional place: 4th
- Owners: Frank McCourt
- President: Dennis Mannion
- General managers: Ned Colletti
- Managers: Joe Torre
- Television: Prime Ticket; KCAL-TV (Vin Scully, Steve Lyons, Eric Collins)
- Radio: KABC (Vin Scully, Rick Monday, Charley Steiner); KHJ (Jaime Jarrín, Pepe Yñiguez, Fernando Valenzuela)

The 2010 Los Angeles Dodgers season was the 121st season for the Los Angeles Dodgers franchise in Major League Baseball (MLB), their 53rd season in Los Angeles, California, and their 49th season playing their home games at Dodger Stadium. The team failed to defend their back-to-back National League West titles as they played their 53rd season in Southern California, since moving from Brooklyn after the 1957 season.

As of the 2025 season, this was the last time the Dodgers finished with a sub-.500 record or ended up behind the Colorado Rockies in the standings.

== Offseason ==
=== McCourt divorce proceedings ===
Prior to the start of Game 1 of the 2009 National League Championship Series, the Dodgers announced that the team's owner and chairman Frank McCourt and his wife Jamie had separated. Immediately after the team was eliminated from the postseason with a loss in Game 5, Frank McCourt fired Jamie from her position as CEO of the Dodgers. In the termination letter, McCourt claimed his wife was guilty of "insubordination and inappropriate behavior". He also claimed that he was the "sole owner" of the Dodgers and that Jamie had no claim on the club.

On October 27, Jamie McCourt filed divorce papers with the Los Angeles courts; her filings asked to be reinstated with the Dodgers and that the judge declare "null and void" a marital agreement from 2004 that Frank claims gives him full ownership of the team. The Dodgers responded by filing their own document with the courts on October 28 stating that Jamie had an affair with an employee and that returning her to the team would be an improper interference in team matters. On November 5, the Superior Court ruled that Jamie should not be reinstated as chief executive of the Dodgers.

The trial itself did not begin until the end of August, and was not resolved during the season.

=== Front office and coaching staff ===
On October 20, 2009, the Dodgers announced a long-term contract extension with General Manager Ned Colletti. On December 7, the Dodgers announced that team President Dennis Mannion would oversee all baseball operations. On November 9, the Dodgers announced that the entire coaching staff would be retained for the 2010 season.

=== Departing free agents ===
The Dodgers off-season officially got underway on October 16, when the club declined the 2010 option on left-handed reliever Will Ohman, making him a free agent. On November 5, the Dodgers declined the $10 million option on starting pitcher Jon Garland, making him a free agent (the option buyout was paid by the Arizona Diamondbacks as part of the trade deal that brought Garland to the Dodgers). Later on November 5, several Dodgers filed for free agency: starting pitchers Randy Wolf and Eric Milton and infielders Orlando Hudson, Ronnie Belliard and Doug Mientkiewicz. The exodus continued on November 6, when five more Dodgers filed for free agency: catcher Brad Ausmus, pinch hitter Jim Thome and pitchers Vicente Padilla, Guillermo Mota and Jeff Weaver. Infielders Mark Loretta and Juan Castro filed for free agency on November 9 and pitcher Jason Schmidt on November 11. The Dodgers chose not to offer arbitration to any of their departing free agents.

=== Rule 5 draft ===
On December 10, 2009, the Rule 5 draft was held. Dodgers outfielder Jamie Hoffmann was selected by the Washington Nationals with the first pick and promptly traded to the New York Yankees. The Dodgers then acquired minor league pitchers Carlos Monasterios and Armando Zerpa. Zerpa was eventually returned to the Boston Red Sox on March 15. On March 22, the Yankees returned Hoffmann to the Dodgers, who promptly assigned him to Triple-A Albuquerque.

=== Trade activity ===
On December 15, the Dodgers traded reserve outfielder Juan Pierre to the Chicago White Sox in exchange for minor league pitchers Jon Link and John Ely.

=== Free agent signings ===
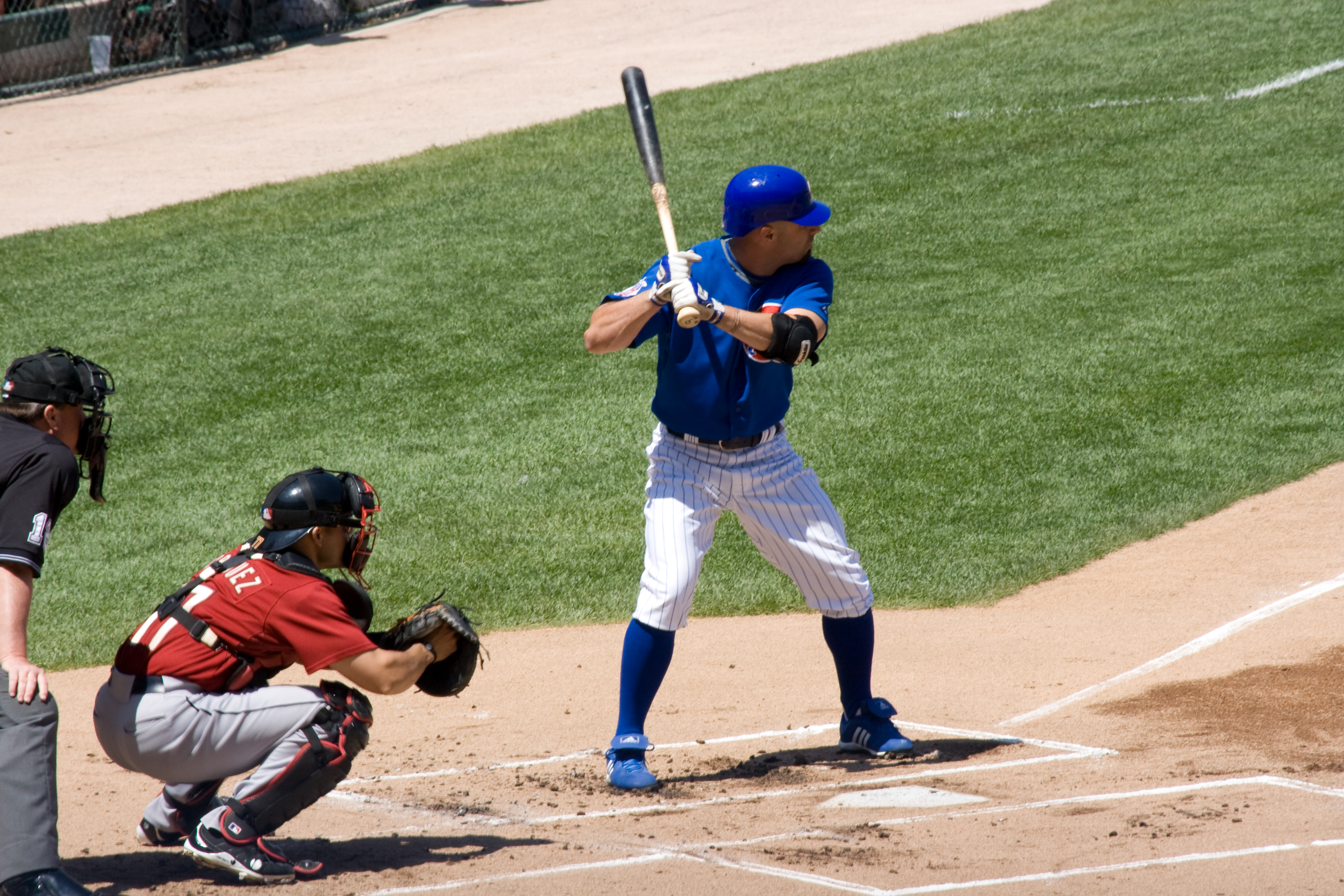
Reed Johnson was signed as a free agent by the Dodgers

On December 17, the Dodgers announced that they had signed free agent infielder Jamey Carroll to a two-year deal. On January 21, the Dodgers re-signed starting pitcher Vicente Padilla to a one-year contract. On January 26, they re-signed Ronnie Belliard and Brad Ausmus to one-year contracts. On February 1, they signed outfielder Reed Johnson to a one-year contract.

== Spring training ==
The Dodgers opened their 2010 training camp at Camelback Ranch on February 20, when pitchers and catchers reported to camp. The rest of the position players arrived on February 25 and the exhibition season began on March 5 with an 8–3 victory over the Chicago White Sox. With most of the roster spots set heading into the spring the main competition was expected to be the battle for the Dodgers fifth starter spot among a cast that included Eric Stults, Charlie Haeger, James McDonald, Scott Elbert, Russ Ortiz, Ramón Ortiz and Carlos Monasterios. The Dodgers also needed to pick a starting second baseman from the trio of Blake DeWitt, Ronnie Belliard and Jamey Carroll. Early in the spring, the Dodgers signed veteran outfielder Garret Anderson to a minor league contract and brought him in to compete for a bench role.

The Dodgers suffered their first injury of 2010 when catcher Russell Martin pulled a groin muscle while stealing a base in the first spring training game. The diagnosis was that he would miss 4–6 weeks, which would cause him to miss the rest of spring training and the start of the season. The Dodgers announced that rookie A. J. Ellis would get the bulk of the playing time in Martin's absence. However, Martin returned from his injury earlier than expected and was back in action before the spring training games ended. Relief pitcher Cory Wade also suffered a recurring of a shoulder injury and underwent arthroscopic surgery on March 17.

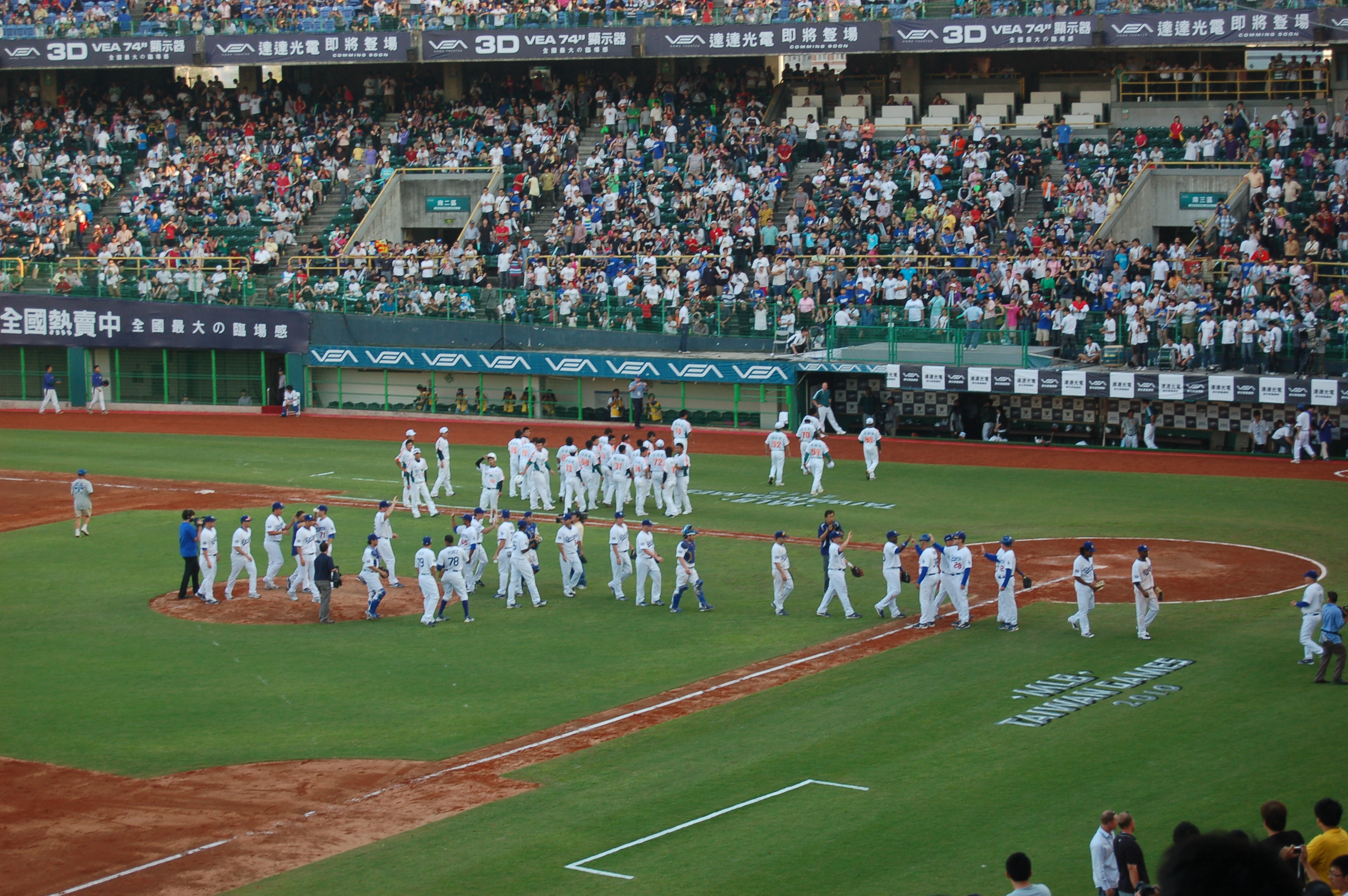
The Dodgers in Taiwan

The Dodgers, led by manager Joe Torre, took a squad of players to Taiwan for a series of three exhibition games against an all-star team from the Chinese Professional Baseball League during the spring. The squad included Manny Ramirez and Taiwanese players Hong-Chih Kuo and Chin-lung Hu. Hitting coach Don Mattingly managed the Dodgers split-squad team in Cactus League games while Torre was overseas.

Setup reliever Ronald Belisario did not show up for spring training as scheduled because of visa problems in his native Venezuela. His visa status was complicated by a driving under the influence charge filed against him in Pasadena. Belisario eventually arrived in camp on March 26 and the Dodgers placed him on the restricted list, meaning he would not be on the opening day roster.

On March 25, the Dodgers announced that Vicente Padilla would be the opening day starter. On March 30, the Dodgers sold starting pitcher Eric Stults to the Hiroshima Toyo Carp in the Japanese League. On March 31, they released outfielder Jason Repko. On April 1, the Dodgers announced the knuckleball pitcher Charlie Haeger had locked up the fifth starter position and that Blake DeWitt would be the starting second baseman.

The Dodgers concluded their Cactus League schedule with a record of 11–13–2.

== Regular season ==
=== Season standings ===
==== National League West ====
NL West
Team	W	L	Pct.	GB	Home	Road
San Francisco Giants	92	70	.568	—	49‍–‍32	43‍–‍38
San Diego Padres	90	72	.556	2	45‍–‍36	45‍–‍36
Colorado Rockies	83	79	.512	9	52‍–‍29	31‍–‍50
Los Angeles Dodgers	80	82	.494	12	45‍–‍36	35‍–‍46
Arizona Diamondbacks	65	97	.401	27	40‍–‍41	25‍–‍56

==== National League Wild Card ====
Division leaders
Team	W	L	Pct.
Philadelphia Phillies	97	65	.599
San Francisco Giants	92	70	.568
Cincinnati Reds	91	71	.562

Wild Card team (Top team qualifies for postseason)
Team	W	L	Pct.	GB
Atlanta Braves	91	71	.562	—
San Diego Padres	90	72	.556	1
St. Louis Cardinals	86	76	.531	5
Colorado Rockies	83	79	.512	8
Florida Marlins	80	82	.494	11
Los Angeles Dodgers	80	82	.494	11
New York Mets	79	83	.488	12
Milwaukee Brewers	77	85	.475	14
Houston Astros	76	86	.469	15
Chicago Cubs	75	87	.463	16
Washington Nationals	69	93	.426	22
Arizona Diamondbacks	65	97	.401	26
Pittsburgh Pirates	57	105	.352	34

==== Record vs. opponents ====
2010 National League record Source: MLB Standings Grid – 2010
Team	AZ	ATL	CHC	CIN	COL	FLA	HOU	LAD	MIL	NYM	PHI	PIT	SD	SF	STL	WSH	AL
Arizona	–	3–4	1–6	2–5	9–9	3–3	4–3	5–13	3–4	5–1	2–4	2–4	8–10	5–13	4–5	3–4	6–9
Atlanta	4–3	–	4–2	3–2	2–4	11–7	5–1	5–3	5–2	11–7	8–10	6–3	4–2	4–3	2–6	8–10	9–6
Chicago	6–1	2–4	–	4–12	2–3	4–2	7–11	3–4	9–6	3–4	4–2	5–10	3–5	2–5	9–6	4–2	8–10
Cincinnati	5–2	2–3	12–4	–	2–5	5–2	10–5	5–4	11–3	4–2	2–5	10–6	2–4	3–4	6–12	4–3	8–7
Colorado	9–9	4–2	3–2	5–2	–	3–4	2–4	7–11	5–4	3–3	1–6	3–4	12–6	9–9	3–4	5–3	9–6
Florida	3–3	7–11	2–4	2–5	4–3	–	3–3	4–2	4–4	12–6	5–13	6–2	3–6	2–5	3–2	13–5	7–8
Houston	3–4	1–5	11–7	5–10	4–2	3–3	–	2–4	8–7	3–4	4–3	11–4	2–5	2–7	10–5	4–4	3–12
Los Angeles	13–5	3–5	4–3	4–5	11–7	2–4	4–2	–	4–2	3–4	2–4	4–3	8–10	8–10	3–4	3–3	4–11
Milwaukee	4–3	2–5	6–9	3–11	4–5	4–4	7–8	2–4	–	5–2	1–5	13–5	3–4	2–5	8–7	4–2	9–6
New York	1–5	7–11	4–3	2–4	3–3	6–12	4–3	4–3	2–5	–	9–9	6–1	3–3	3–4	3–3	9–9	13–5
Philadelphia	4–2	10–8	2–4	5–2	6–1	13–5	3–4	4–2	5–1	9–9	–	2–4	5–2	3–3	4–4	12–6	10–8
Pittsburgh	4–2	3–6	10–5	6–10	4–3	2–6	4–11	3–4	5–13	1–6	4–2	–	0–6	2–4	6–9	1–5	2–13
San Diego	10–8	2–4	5–3	4–2	6–12	6–3	5–2	10–8	4–3	3–3	2–5	6–0	–	12–6	3–4	3–3	9–6
San Francisco	13–5	3–4	5–2	4–3	9–9	5–2	7–2	10–8	5–2	4–3	3–3	4–2	6–12	–	3–3	4–2	7–8
St. Louis	5–4	6–2	6–9	12–6	4–3	2–3	5–10	4–3	7–8	3–3	4–4	9–6	4–3	3–3	–	3–3	9–6
Washington	4–3	10–8	2–4	3–4	3–5	5–13	4–4	3–3	2–4	9–9	6–12	5–1	3–3	2–4	3–3	–	5–13

=== Opening Day starters ===
Opening Day starters
Name	Position
Rafael Furcal	Shortstop
Russell Martin	Catcher
Andre Ethier	Right fielder
Manny Ramirez	Left fielder
Matt Kemp	Center fielder
James Loney	First baseman
Casey Blake	Third baseman
Blake DeWitt	Second baseman
Vicente Padilla	Starting pitcher

=== April ===
The Dodgers opened the regular season on April 5 in Pittsburgh, as opening day starter Vicente Padilla was roughed up in an 11–5 loss to the Pirates. After dropping the second game of the season on a walk-off hit by Ronny Cedeño in the 10th inning, the Dodgers rebounded and avoided being swept by posting a 10–2 rout in the series finale. Ronnie Belliard came up big with a home run, double and triple to back a solid start by Chad Billingsley. The Dodgers traveled to Florida to take on the Marlins in their next series and Hiroki Kuroda started things off by allowing only one unearned run and striking out seven in eight innings as the Dodgers won the series opener 7–3. The Dodgers blew a two-run lead in the ninth inning in the next game, as George Sherrill failed in a save opportunity and they lost 7–6. In that game, Manny Ramirez recorded his 2,500th career hit with a fifth-inning infield single. The team concluded its opening road trip on April 11, Charlie Haeger struck out 12 batters in six innings but the bullpen again faltered and the Dodgers fell 6–5 to the Marlins.

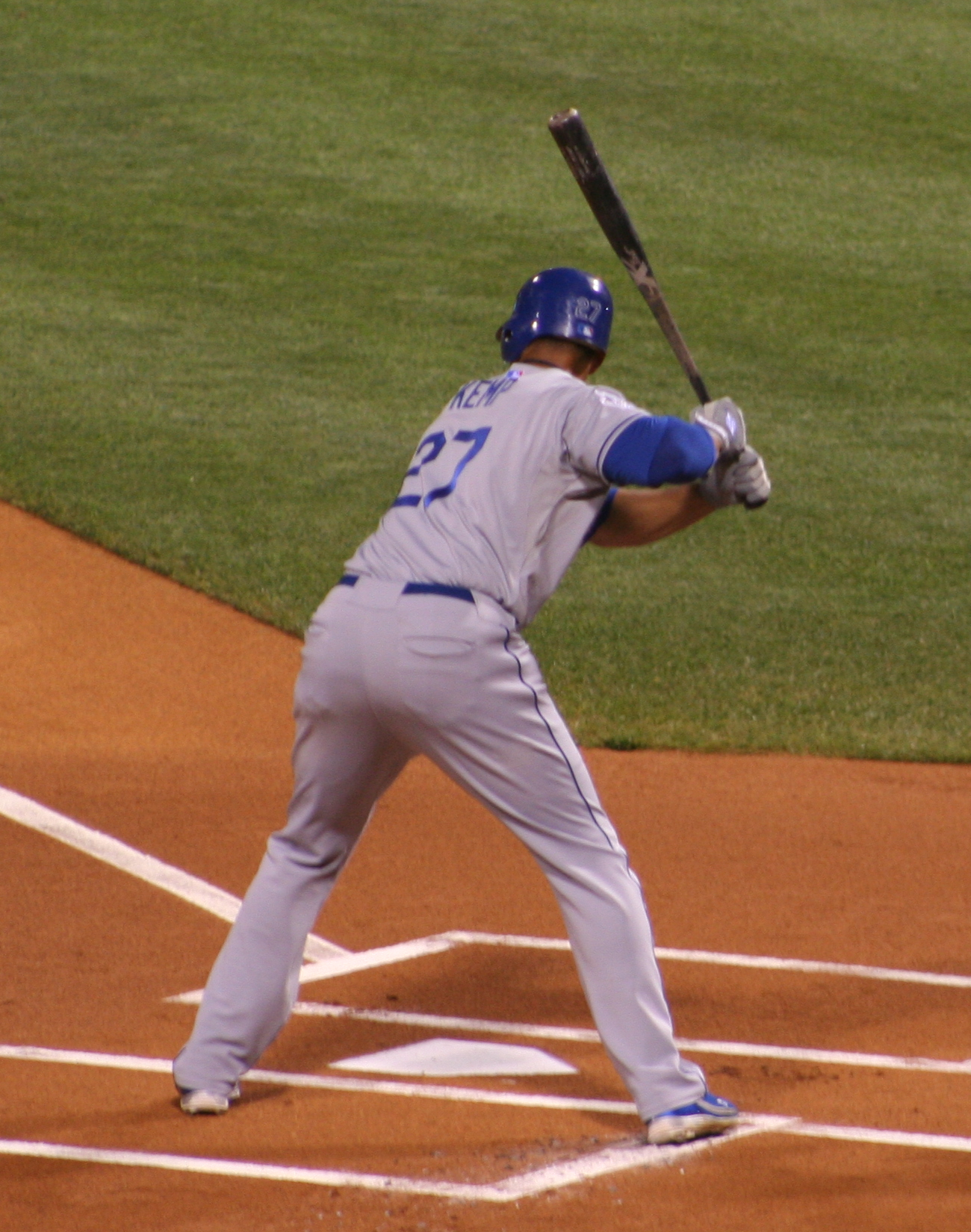
Matt Kemp hit four home runs in four days in April

The Dodgers returned to Dodger Stadium for their home opener on April 13. Ramirez, Casey Blake, Andre Ethier and Matt Kemp all hit home runs as Clayton Kershaw picked up his first victory since July 18, 2009 in the Dodgers 9–5 victory over the Arizona Diamondbacks. The next day, the Dodgers overcame a shaky start by Billingsley and rallied from two down in the bottom of the ninth to send the game into extra innings, only to fall to the Diamondbacks in the 11th. In the final game of the series, a throwing error by Stephen Drew helped the Dodgers tie the game in the bottom of the ninth and then they won in the 10th on a walk off hit by Ethier. The Dodgers opened a three-game series with the San Francisco Giants on April 16. Matt Kemp hit his fourth home run in four days and Andre Ethier hit two home runs (including his first career grand slam) as the Dodgers won 10–8. In the second game of the series, Charlie Haeger had control problems from the start and Giants ace Tim Lincecum shut down the Dodgers, as the Giants won 9–0. The Dodgers concluded the home stand on April 18. Kershaw engaged in a scoreless duel with Giants pitcher Barry Zito until the seventh when he gave up a home run to Juan Uribe. Manny Ramirez then hit a two-run pinch hit home run off relief pitcher Sergio Romo in the bottom of the 8th to give the Dodgers the 2–1 win. The Homer was the 548th of Ramirez career, tying Mike Schmidt for 14th place on the all-time list.

The Dodgers traveled to Cincinnati to begin their second road trip of the season. Chad Billingsley only lasted three innings in the series opener against the Reds, as the Dodgers fell behind 9–2 early on. A three-run home run by Matt Kemp keyed a comeback that tied the game at 9, but Ramón Troncoso allowed two runs in the bottom of the eighth and the Dodgers lost 11–9. In the second game against the Reds, the Dodgers won 14–6, led by home runs by Kemp and Ethier and a two-run double by Rafael Furcal. Manny Ramirez delivered his 1,800th career RBI with a single in the fifth inning, the 19th player in MLB history to reach that mark. In the series finale, the Dodgers got nine hits and belted two homers (including a pinch-hit two run shot by Garret Anderson) but two costly errors and two blown leads by the bullpen late in the game were too much to overcome, as they lost 8–5 to the Reds. In the series opener against the Washington Nationals, Adam Dunn hit two home runs off Haeger and the Dodgers lost 5–1. On April 24, Carlos Monasterios notched his first career victory and Casey Blake hit two home runs in the Dodgers 4–3 win in 13 innings. Chad Billingsley rebounded to turn in his first quality start of the season on April 25, allowing just one earned run in six innings, but the Dodger offense was shut down by Nationals pitching and the team lost 1–0. The Dodgers next traveled to New York to take on the Mets. The scheduled first game of the series was rained out, forcing the Dodgers and Mets to play a doubleheader on April 27. In the first game, Johan Santana and two relievers shut out the Dodgers 4–0, the Dodgers second consecutive shut out defeat. The Dodgers also lost Game 2, by a score of 10–5 as Haeger and the bullpen were beaten up. In the series finale, the Dodgers lost 7–3 as AAA pitcher John Ely made his Major League debut. The sweep finished off a disappointing 2–7 road trip for the Dodgers.

The Dodgers returned home on April 29 to play the Pirates in a four-game series. In the opener, two runs scored for the Pirates in the first inning after Matt Kemp misplayed a ball in center field and that was the extent of the scoring. The Dodgers were shut out 2–0 and their losing streak extended to five games. The Dodgers finally snapped their losing streak on April 30, as Ethier hit a two-run homer and James Loney a three-run blast to back a solid start by Chad Billingsley as the Dodgers won 6–2.

=== May ===
The Dodgers began the month of May with a 5–1 victory over the Pirates. Andre Ethier hit a three-run home run, rookie Carlos Monasterios started his first game in the Majors and Ramón Ortiz picked up his first win since 2007. The Dodgers concluded their series with the Pirates with a 9–3 victory. Hiroki Kuroda pitched eight solid innings and Ethier hit two home runs in the game. The Milwaukee Brewers came to town for a three-game series starting on May 4. In the opener, Clayton Kershaw was pounded for seven runs in the second inning and the Dodgers lost 11–6. The Dodgers again were blown out the following day 11–3 as the Brewers scored four runs in the first off Billingsley and the bullpen gave up seven runs in the eighth. Rookie John Ely allowed only one run in 6 2/3 innings in the series finale and Andre Ethier hit a walk-off grand slam as the Dodgers avoided the sweep with a 7–3 victory. The Dodgers welcomed the Colorado Rockies to town for a three-game weekend series. In the opener, Jeff Weaver picked up his 100th career win in relief and Matt Kemp drove in the winning run with a triple in the sixth inning as the Dodgers won 6–5. On May 8, Charlie Haeger allowed five runs in the top of the first without recording an out and was quickly removed from the game. The Dodgers were blown out 8–0. Kershaw out dueled Rockies ace Ubaldo Jiménez in the series finale, striking out nine in the Dodgers 2–0 victory.

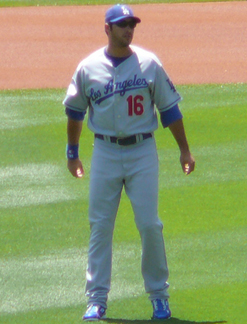
Andre Ethier was off to a terrific start in May before injuring his pinkie finger

The Dodgers traveled to Phoenix, Arizona for a three-game series against the Diamondbacks on May 10. In the opener, Chad Billingsley and three relief pitchers allowed just four hits in a 7–3 victory. The following day, John Ely picked up his first career win and the Dodgers scored seven runs in the eighth inning to pull away in a 13–3 win. Hiroki Kuroda struck out nine in 7 1/3 innings as the Dodgers completed the sweep of the Diamondbacks with a 6–3 victory. The Dodgers next went to San Diego to begin a series against the division leading Padres. With Haeger and Padilla injured, Ramón Ortiz made his first Major League start since May 26, 2007. The Dodgers won the game 4–3 thanks to a two-run home run by Matt Kemp in the seventh inning to extend the team's winning streak to five games. Ethier injured the little finger on his right hand and was scratched from the lineup on May 15, but the Dodgers extended their winning streak as Clayton Kershaw threw a three-hitter over seven innings and James Loney hit a home run in the 4–1 win. The Dodgers completed the sweep of the Padres as Chad Billingsley out dueled Wade LeBlanc 1–0 in the series finale.

The Dodgers continued their winning streak when they returned home for a brief series with the Houston Astros. John Ely again pitched well in his fourth career start, allowing one run on five hits and striking out eight in seven innings as the Dodgers won 6–2. On May 18, the Dodgers placed Ethier on the 15-day disabled list, but continued their winning streak by beating the Astros 7–3 to pull to within one game of the division leading Padres. The streak was stopped at nine as the visiting Padres pounded the Dodgers 10–5 on May 19. Ortiz and Troncoso combined to allow five runs in the fourth inning. The Dodgers returned to the winning ways the following day with a 4–1 victory. Kershaw pitched 7 1/3 innings, allowing the one run, in his third straight terrific start. The Dodgers opened interleague play by welcoming the Detroit Tigers to Dodger Stadium on May 21. Billingsley turned in another solid start, allowing one run in seven innings and Dontrelle Willis was wild in the fourth inning as the Dodgers won 4–1 to move into a tie for first place in the NL West. John Ely won his third start of the season the following day, as Kemp and Blake both hit home runs and Jonathan Broxton picked up his tenth save of the season in the 6–4 victory. The Tigers avoided the sweep by beating the Dodgers 6–2 in the series finale, thanks to a two-run first inning homer by Miguel Cabrera.

The Dodgers went on the road to play the Chicago Cubs next. Rafael Furcal was activated from the disabled list before the game and committed two errors that led to two unearned runs. Clayton Kershaw again pitched well, but Ryan Dempster shut down the Dodgers offense and the road trip started with a 3–0 loss. In the second game of the series, James Loney had three hits and Chad Billingsley won his fourth consecutive decision as the Dodgers topped the Cubs 8–5. In the series closer, Ely took a shutout into the eighth inning only to lose 1–0 as Xavier Paul misplayed two consecutive hits in right field. The next stop for the Dodgers was Denver, Colorado, where they rallied from four runs down to beat the Rockies 5–4. Matt Kemp hit his tenth home run of the season, and Manny Ramirez hit his third. The home run by Ramirez was the 549th of his career, breaking the tie with Mike Schmidt for 14th place on the all-time home run list. He also moved into a tie with Frank Robinson for 18th on the all-time RBI list with his 1,812th. Hiroki Kuroda suffered his worst start of the season on May 29 as he gave up seven runs in four innings in the Dodgers 11–3 loss to the Rockies. Clayton Kershaw and four relief pitchers held the Rockies down the following game as the Dodgers won the series with a 4–3 win in the finale.

The Dodgers concluded the month of May with a home game against the Diamondbacks. Ethier finally returned to the lineup after missing a couple of weeks with his pinkie injury and the Dodgers won the game on a walk-off balk 5–4.

=== June ===
June began with a pitchers' duel between John Ely and Dan Haren. The game was scoreless through nine innings and the Dodgers finally won the game 1–0 on a walk-off home run by Matt Kemp in the bottom of the 10th. The following day, the Dodgers beat the Diamondbacks 1–0 in 14 innings. Travis Schlichting pitched four scoreless innings of relief for his first Major League victory. Garret Anderson's walk-off single capped the Dodgers third straight victory in their last at-bat. The Dodgers brief winning streak ended when they fell 4–3 to the Atlanta Braves the following day. James Loney's tie-breaking RBI single off Braves reliever Eric O'Flaherty helped the Dodgers win the second game of the series, 5–4, and end the Braves nine-game winning streak. In the third game the Braves scored seven runs in the seventh inning to rout the Dodgers 9–3. The series ended with a split when the Dodgers won the finale on a walk-off single by A. J. Ellis in the 11th inning for a 5–4 victory. Blake DeWitt's career high five RBIs powered the Dodgers to a lopsided 12–4 victory in the opener of a three-game series against the St. Louis Cardinals on June 7. Manny Ramirez's RBI double in the bottom of the eighth in the second game provided the only offense of the night in a 1–0 victory that pulled the Dodgers into sole possession of first place for the first time all season. The Dodgers completed their first home sweep of the Cards in 22 years when Clayton Kershaw struck out 10 in seven innings and Ramirez homered to lead the Dodgers to a 4–3 victory in the series finale. Chad Billingsley allowed a career high seven runs in 5 2/3 innings in the first game of a weekend series against the Los Angeles Angels of Anaheim, as the Dodgers lost 10–1. In the second game the Dodgers loaded the bases with one out in the seventh inning but failed to score as they dropped their second straight to the Angels, 4–2. The Angels won the finale 6–5 for their first sweep of the Dodgers since interleague play began.

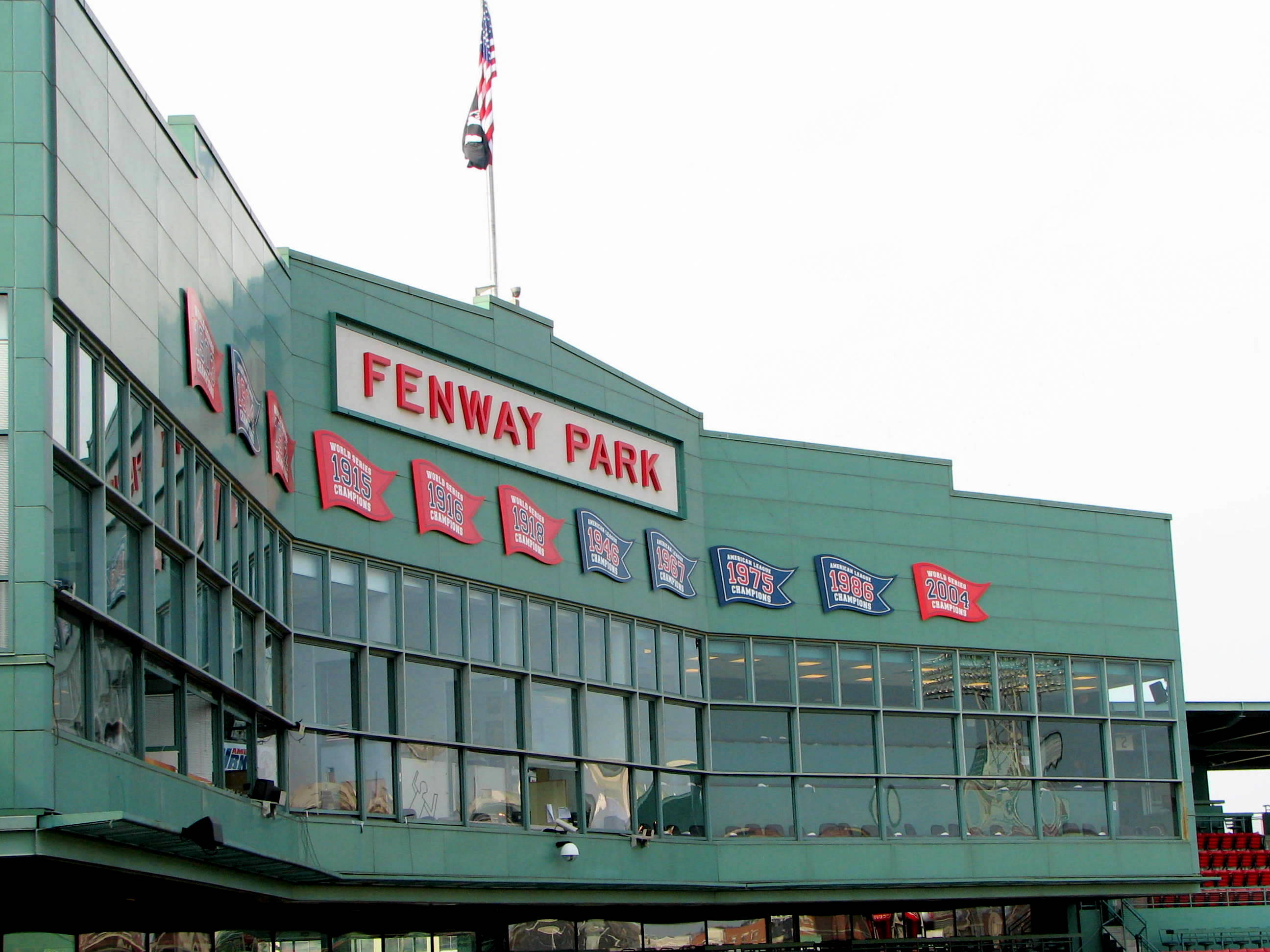
The Dodgers made a rare visit to Boston's Fenway Park

The Dodgers opened their next road trip with a 12–0 rout of the Reds in Cincinnati. Rafael Furcal had five hits in the game, which included a rain delay of two hours and 24 minutes in the top of the fifth inning. In the following game, Clayton Kershaw pitched 7 1/3 solid innings and Andre Ethier hit his first home run since coming off the disabled list as the Dodgers won 6–2. In the series finale, the Reds avoided the sweep as pitcher Bronson Arroyo clocked a three-run home run off Dodger starter John Ely in the Reds 7–1 victory. The Dodgers next traveled to Fenway Park to open an interleague series against the Boston Red Sox. The series was a bit of a curiosity because it marked the first return to Fenway by Manny Ramirez since his trade from the Red Sox two seasons before. Three of the Red Sox hit home runs off rookie Carlos Monasterios and the Dodgers fell 10–6 in the opener. Vicente Padilla returned to the starting rotation in the second game, his first start since being placed on the DL in late April, but the Dodgers lost 5–4 on a walk-off single by Dustin Pedroia. Hiroki Kuroda pitched well in the finale, but Boston starter Clay Buchholz shut down the Dodgers 2–0 for the series sweep. The Dodgers losing streak reached five when they dropped the opener of their next series 6–3 at Anaheim. Bobby Abreu tied the game with a three-run homer off Kershaw in the sixth and Kevin Frandsen put it away with a two-run double in the seventh. The next day, a couple of base running blunders by Kemp and Russell Martin cost the Dodgers a chance to tie the game in the ninth and they dropped their sixth straight, losing to the Angels 2–1. The poor road trip finally reached an end with a 10–6 victory over the Angels, snapping the losing streak. A five-run fifth against Angels starter Scott Kazmir did most of the damage in a game in which every position player, other than Kemp, had at least one RBI.

The Dodgers returned home on June 25 to conclude interleague play with a series against the New York Yankees. This was the first time manager Joe Torre faced his former team from the opposing dugout. The Dodgers dropped the opener 2–1 as Alex Rodriguez hit a home run and a double and scored both runs. The Dodgers took the middle game of the series 9–4 thanks to four RBIs from James Loney. In the series finale, the Dodgers built a 6–2 lead thanks to another impressive start by Clayton Kershaw but closer Jonathan Broxton lost the lead in the ninth and Robinson Canó hit a two-run blast in the tenth to give the Yankees an 8–6 comeback victory.

The Dodgers traveled to AT&T Park for a divisional contest against the Giants. In the series opener, Casey Blake hit a two-run homer and the Dodgers turned five double plays in a 4–2 victory. In the second game, John Ely out-pitched Matt Cain and James Loney drove in three runs in the Dodgers second straight 4–2 victory. The Dodgers finished off the sweep with an 8–2 victory in the finale as Vicente Padilla allowed just one run in seven innings to earn his 100th career victory.

=== July ===
The Dodgers began the month of July in Arizona for a series against the Diamondbacks. The series opener was the first game as Diamondbacks manager for former Dodger Kirk Gibson, who replaced the fired A. J. Hinch for the July 2 game. The Dodgers lost 12–5 as Hiroki Kuroda had his worst outing of the season, lasting less than two innings. The Dodgers rebounded with a 14–1 victory in the next game. Clayton Kershaw was effective, Kemp, Ethier and Furcal homered and the Diamondbacks committed a franchise-record six errors in the game. Kemp homered for the third game in four starts in the series finale as the Dodgers won 3–1.

The Dodgers returned home to play the Florida Marlins. In the opener, John Ely was unable to make it out of the third inning and the Dodgers lost 6–5, despite a two-run homer by Furcal. In the following game, Vicente Padilla was sharp, striking out nine in 6 2/3 innings as Kemp, Blake and Ethier all hit home runs in the Dodgers' 7–3 win. The Dodgers dropped the finale 4–0 as they were unable to get anything going against the Marlins ace Josh Johnson. On July 8, the Dodgers picked up a 3–2 win over the Cubs as Clayton Kershaw pitched a strong eight innings, notching 12 strikeouts. Chad Billingsley pitched well on July 9 against the Cubs, though a shaky bullpen effort almost let the game get away. The Dodgers won 9–7. Ely again pitched poorly in the third game of the series, allowing six runs in 2 1/3 innings as the Dodgers lost 7–3. Ely was optioned to the Triple-A Albuquerque Isotopes after the game. In the series finale, Vicente Padilla tossed eight shutout innings in the Dodgers' 7–0 victory. The Dodgers headed into the All-Star break in second place in the National League West.

Following the All-Star break, the Dodgers opened up a four-game series against the St. Louis Cardinals. Clayton Kershaw struggled in the opener and the Cards won 7–1. The following night, Chad Billingsley also had a poor start also both Ramirez and Martin had to leave due to injuries as the Dodgers lost 8–4. A shorthanded roster the following day led to a 2–0 shutout at the hands of Adam Wainwright and the Cards. The Cards completed the four-game series sweep as Matt Holliday's RBI single off Broxton gave them a 5–4 walk-off win.

James McDonald made his first start of the season in the opener of the Dodgers three-game home stand with the Giants. McDonald struggled in the game, allowing nine hits and four runs in five innings as the Dodgers lost 5–2. In the second game of the series, Clayton Kershaw pitched well into the seventh inning before he and the manager were ejected after he hit a batter to start the seventh. The game took an odd turn when the Giants, down by one run, loaded the bases against closer Jonathan Broxton in the ninth. Acting manager Don Mattingly inadvertently made an illegal second trip to the mound and Broxton had to be removed. George Sherrill gave up what would be the winning run as the Dodgers lost their sixth straight, 7–5. In the aftermath of the game, Kershaw was suspended for five games and manager Joe Torre and bench coach Bob Schaefer were each suspended for one game. Under acting manager Mattingly, the Dodgers finally ended their losing streak on July 21. Chad Billingsley pitched a complete game, five hit, shutout in the Dodgers 2–0 victory. The New York Mets visited Dodger Stadium for a four-game series next. In the opener, Hiroki Kuroda pitched eight scoreless innings as the Dodgers picked up their second straight 2–0 victory. Matt Kemp drove in both runs with a homer and a double. In the following game, Padilla pitched seven solid innings but the bullpen struggled, allowing four runs in the eighth inning in the Dodgers 6–1 loss. James Loney hit his first career walk-off home run in the 13th inning to give the Dodgers a 3–2 victory in the third game of the series. In the series finale, Russell Martin's RBI double in the bottom of the eighth inning as the only score of the game as the Dodgers won 1–0. Clayton Kershaw pitched eight scoreless innings and rookie Kenley Jansen, who made his Major League debut just the night before, picked up his first career save.

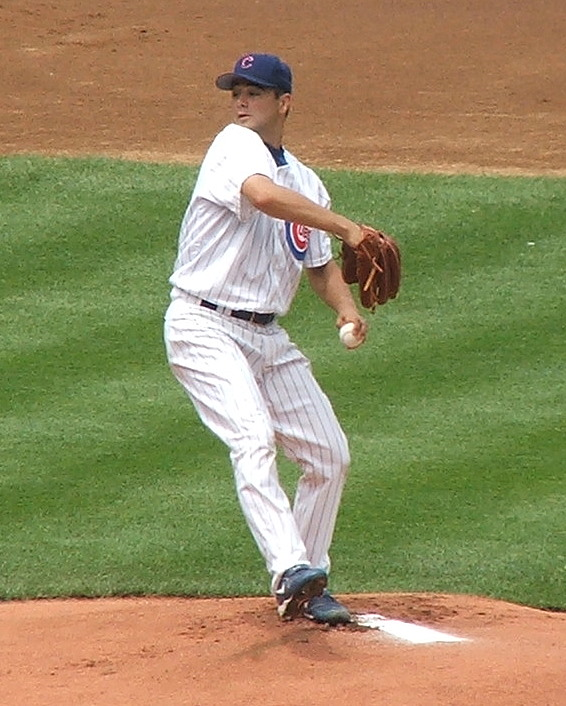
Starting pitcher Ted Lilly was acquired by the Dodgers at the trading deadline

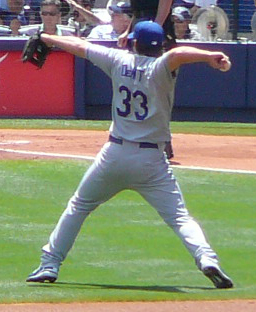
Blake DeWitt's tenure with the Dodgers ended on July 31

The Dodgers next traveled to San Diego for a series with the division-leading Padres. In the opener, Andre Ethier's two-run pinch-hit single gave the Dodgers a 2–0 victory. The Dodgers offense continued to sputter the next day as they fell 6–1 to the Padres. In an effort to bolster the sagging offensive production, the Dodgers on July 28 acquired outfielder Scott Podsednik from the Kansas City Royals for two minor leaguers. However, the new addition went 0 for 3 in his debut and the Padres won a pitching duel 3–2 on a walk-off hit by Scott Hairston in the bottom of the ninth. The loss dropped the Dodgers seven games behind the Padres in the NL West. The Dodgers traveled to San Francisco for a series against the Giants. Despite a three-run rally in the ninth inning, the Dodgers lost the opener 6–5. In the second game, Chad Billingsley was again superb, pitching 6 2/3 scoreless innings, extending his scoreless innings streak to 21. However, the Dodger offense was again anemic and Jonathan Broxton suffered his fourth blown save of the season, allowing a two-run homer to Pat Burrell as the Dodgers lost 2–1.

The Dodgers were active in trades at the July 31 deadline. To reinforce the starting rotation, the Dodgers on July 31 acquired starter Ted Lilly from the Chicago Cubs, along with infielder Ryan Theriot, in exchange for Blake DeWitt and two minor-league pitchers (Brett Wallach and Kyle Smit). The Dodgers also added to the bullpen by acquiring closer Octavio Dotel from the Pittsburgh Pirates in exchange for James McDonald and minor league outfielder Andrew Lambo.

=== August ===
The month of August began much the same way July ended. The Dodgers dropped their fifth straight game, being swept by the Giants 2–0 despite a solid pitching performance from Clayton Kershaw, who returned from suspension to allow two runs in seven innings. Manager Joe Torre commented on the team's hitting woes by saying "Right now two runs, unfortunately, is really a very tall mountain for us to climb."

The team limped home on August 2 to open a four-game home stand against the Padres. In the opener, Hiroki Kuroda struggled as the Dodgers losing streak hit six with a 10–5 loss. Matt Kemp had four hits in four at-bats in the game. The Dodgers finally snapped the losing streak the next night as Ted Lilly made an impressive Dodgers debut. Lilly retired 20 straight after allowing a 1st-inning home run to Miguel Tejada. A two-run double by Russell Martin in the 2nd inning was all the offense the Dodgers could muster but it was enough to pick up a 2–1 victory. The victory did not come without a cost however, as Martin suffered a season-ending injury when he tore the labrum in his right knee during a collision at home plate. With backup catcher Brad Ausmus in the lineup, the Dodgers picked up a 9–0 victory on August 4. Vicente Padilla took a no-hitter into the seventh inning and pitched a complete game, two-hit shutout. The following day, the offense once more went into hibernation as the Dodgers dropped the series finale, 5–0. In the opener of a three-game series against the Washington Nationals, Kershaw struck out nine but allowed two three-run homers to Adam Dunn and the Dodgers lost 6–3. The Dodgers won the following day, on a walk-off single by James Loney in the 10th for a 3–2 victory. The Dodgers concluded the home stand with an 8–3 Sunday afternoon win over the Nationals, handing Ted Lilly his second victory since joining the Dodgers.

The Dodgers next traveled to Philadelphia for a road series against the two-time defending National League champion Phillies. In the opener, the Dodgers offense finally came alive, scoring a season-high 15 runs in a 15–9 victory. The game featured the first home run since 2007 by outfielder Jay Gibbons, who was just called up from AAA a few days before. In the second game of the series, the bats were silenced by Phillies pitcher Roy Oswalt, who shut the Dodgers down 2–0. In the finale, the Dodgers jumped to a 9–2 lead thanks to 6 2/3 quality innings by Clayton Kershaw and a four-RBI effort from Matt Kemp. However, a poor outing from Ronald Belisario in the eighth cut the lead to 9–6 and then Jonathan Broxton was unable to retire a batter in the ninth as the Phillies stormed back for a 10–9 walk-off victory. Next the Dodgers traveled to Atlanta for a four-game series against the Braves. In the opener, the Dodgers were shut out for the 14th time in the season, this time by Tim Hudson. Hiroki Kuroda allowed just one run in seven innings (a solo home run by Brooks Conrad), but it was enough as the team lost 1–0. Ted Lilly picked up his third straight win for the Dodgers, as they won the next game 2–1. The Dodgers string of impressive performances from their starting pitchers was ended on August 15, when Vicente Padilla was pounded for eight runs in 4 1/3 inning and the Dodgers lost a blow-out 13–1. In the series finale, the Dodgers wasted another gem from Chad Billingsley as the bullpen blew another lead, allowing three runs in the ninth inning to fall 4–3 as Melky Cabrera hit a two-run bases-loaded walk-off single off Octavio Dotel.

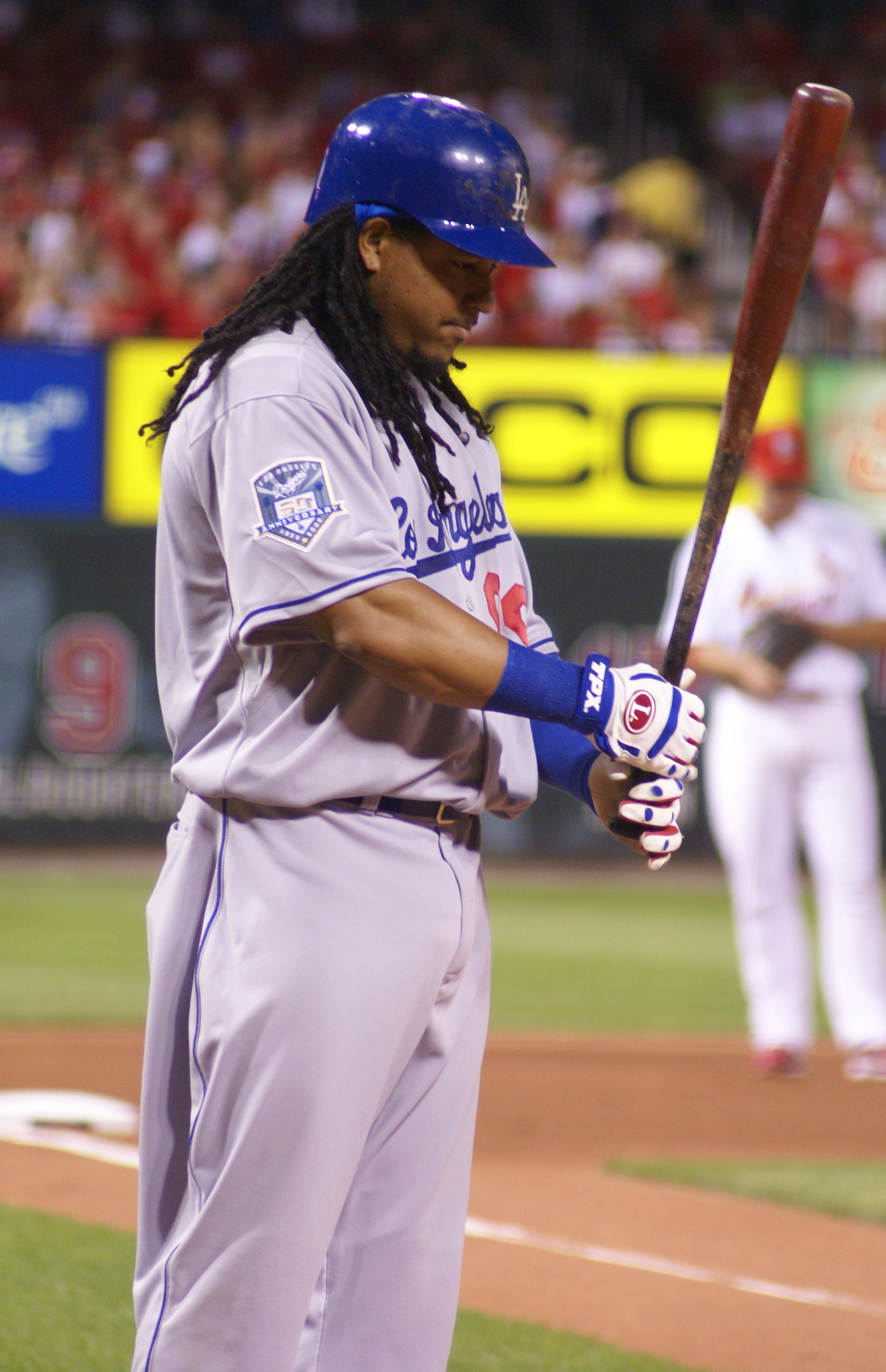
Mannywood closed its doors on August 30, 2010

The Dodgers returned home for a series against the Colorado Rockies. Clayton Kershaw threw seven shutout innings in the first game of the series, leading the Dodgers to a 6–0 victory. In the second game, the Dodgers dropped the contest 3–2 in ten innings as reliever Octavio Dotel threw three wild pitches that led to the go-ahead run scoring. The Dodgers came up on top in the final game of the series, when Ted Lilly pitched a complete game, two-hit shutout and Reed Johnson hit a two-run home run for the only runs of the game, 2–0. The Cincinnati Reds came to town for the next series. The Reds came into the series with a streak of not having won a game at Dodger Stadium since 2005. They snapped that streak the first game, when Reds starter Homer Bailey shut down the Dodgers offense and the Reds capitalized on a throwing error by Dodger starter Carlos Monasterios to pull out a 3–1 victory. Monasterios started the game after Vicente Padilla was placed on the 15-day disabled list. The Dodgers offense, dormant for much of the second half of the season, finally showed up in the second game of the series. The Dodgers slugged back-to-back homers in both the second and third innings off Reds starter Johnny Cueto and held on for an 8–5 victory. However, the bats vanished again the following day as the Dodgers lost 5–2 despite a strong start from Clayton Kershaw, who struck out 11 in seven innings. In an effort to bolster their catching corps, depleted by Russell Martin's season-ending injury, the Dodgers acquired Rod Barajas off waivers from the New York Mets on August 22.

Barajas made his Dodgers debut in the opener of a three-game series at the Milwaukee Brewers. In his debut he hit two doubles and a three-run homer to propel the Dodgers to a 5–3 victory. Manny Ramirez, activated from the disabled list a few days beforehand, hit two doubles in the Dodgers' 5–4 victory in the next game. The bullpen came up big in the series finale, as the Dodgers earned their first series sweep since June with a 7–1 victory.

The Dodgers went on the road to play the Rockies and extended their winning streak to four games with a 6–2 comeback win, highlighted by Casey Blake's grand slam in the eighth inning. The streak was snapped the next day as Jhoulys Chacín stymied the Dodger offense. The Dodgers lost again the next day, as Ted Lilly allowed seven runs in four innings for his first loss with the Dodgers, 10–5.

With the team six games back in the Wild Card race after the series against the Rockies, the Dodgers allowed Manny Ramirez to be claimed off waivers by the Chicago White Sox. His final act as a Dodger was being thrown out of a game for arguing balls and strikes as a pinch hitter in the finale against the Rockies.

The Dodgers began their post-Manny era at home against the Phillies and their ace Roy Halladay. Hiroki Kuroda outpitched Halladay, taking a no-hitter into the eighth inning before Shane Victorino broke it up with a one-out single. Kuroda and reliever Hong-Chih Kuo wound up combining on a one-hit shutout as the Dodgers picked up a 3–0 victory. The Dodgers fell to 6 1/2 games back in the Wild Card race as August drew to a close when they were beaten by the Phillies 8–4. Rookie Carlos Monasterios had his worst start, unable to get out of the third inning, while allowing five runs.

=== September/October ===
September began with an impressive pitching duel between Clayton Kershaw and Roy Oswalt. Kershaw struck out 11 batters but allowed two solo home runs and that was enough to do him in. Oswalt took a no-hitter into the sixth inning as the Phillies closed out the series with a 5–1 victory. The rival San Francisco Giants came to Dodger Stadium for the next series. Chad Billingsley welcomed them to town by throwing a two-hitter for eight innings and hitting a two-run single for the decisive runs in the Dodgers 4–2 victory. In the second game, Ted Lilly pitched a one-hitter through six innings and Jay Gibbons hit a three-run homer to stake the Dodgers to a 4–0 lead. However, the bullpen imploded again and Jonathan Broxton blew his sixth save of the season when Juan Uribe hit a two-run homer off him for a 5–4 Giants win.

The Dodgers disappointing season saw another low when they fell to .500 with a 4–2 loss to the Padres in San Diego. Vicente Padilla came off the disabled list to allow three runs in four innings as the Dodgers helped the Padres snap their season-worst 10-game losing streak. They fell below .500 the next night as Clayton Kershaw allowed two runs in seven innings, but was out-dueled by Mat Latos, who allowed only three hits in seven innings while striking out 10. The Padres won 2–1. The Dodgers were swept by the Padres and picked up their fifth straight defeat when Cory Luebke shut out the Dodgers 4–0 in the second start of his career. Chad Billingsley pitched well but defensive miscues in the sixth inning contributed to the loss.

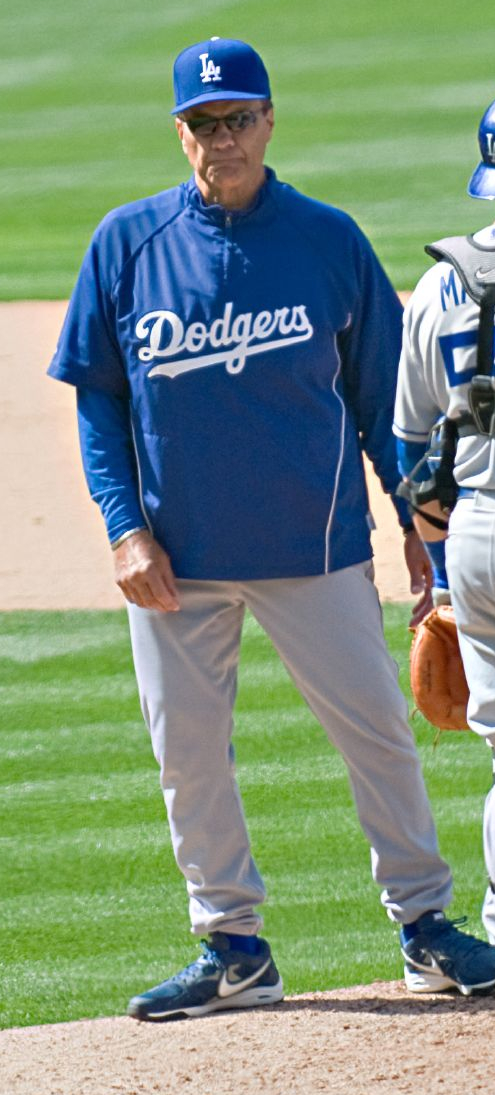
Dodger Manager Joe Torre announced his retirement on September 17

The Dodgers lost their sixth straight game when Chris Johnson hit a three-run home run off Ted Lilly in the sixth inning for a 3–2 victory for the Houston Astros, in the opener of a four-game series. The Dodgers snapped the losing streak the following night when Jay Gibbons hit a two-run homer in the 11th inning to give the Dodgers a 4–2 victory. The Dodgers won again the next day, 6–3, the winning runs scoring on a throwing error by Brandon Lyon. Carlos Monasterios made an emergency start in the final game of the series after Vicente Padilla was unable to go because of a recurring injury. However, Monasterios was unable to get out of the second inning as the Dodgers fell behind early. Jay Gibbons hit a three-run homer in the fourth to help bring the team close, but they lost 7–4. The Dodgers managed only one hit in the opening game of a three-game series at San Francisco, but still beat the Giants 1–0 thanks to Clayton Kershaw's first career complete game shutout. The next night, Chad Billingsley almost matched Kershaw, allowing only a broken-bat RBI single in seven innings, but the team lost 2–1 as Matt Cain pitched seven scoreless innings and the Dodgers were unable to score until Andre Ethier's two-out home run in the ninth. In the finale, Ted Lilly gave up two homers in 3 1/3 innings as the Dodgers were blown out 10–2. The only positive for the Dodgers in the game was that September callup Russ Mitchell recorded his first career hit, a home run to left field off of Giants starter Jonathan Sánchez in the 5th inning.

Prior to their homestand against the Colorado Rockies, Dodger manager Joe Torre announced his intention to retire at the end of the season and that Don Mattingly would take over as the Manager for the 2011 season. The Dodgers followed the news with a 7–5 loss to the Rockies. Relief pitcher Octavio Dotel switched dugouts prior to the second game as the Dodgers traded him to the Rockies for a player to be named later. The Dodgers then proceeded to be blown out 12–2 as Troy Tulowitzki slugged two homers and Melvin Mora hit a grand slam, while John Ely was roughed up in the loss. The Dodgers fell behind 6–1 in the series finale, but came back to send the game into extra innings, finally winning the game 7–6 on a walk-off hit by A. J. Ellis in the 11th inning. The Dodgers two-year stay as National League Western Division champions came to an end on September 21 when they were officially eliminated from post-season contention when the Giants beat the Cubs. The Dodgers then proceeded to be shut out by the Padres 6–0, the first career shutout for Padres starter Clayton Richard and the 17th time the Dodgers had been shut out in 2010, the most in the league and their highest total since 1989. In the next game, Ted Lilly struck out eight in seven innings, but the Dodgers managed just three hits in a 3–1 defeat. The Dodgers avoided being swept at home due to Hiroki Kuroda's eight-inning, one-run performance in the Dodgers' 3–1 win over the Padres.

The Dodgers began their final road trip of the season against the Arizona Diamondbacks. Clayton Kershaw took a two-hit shutout into the ninth inning before leaving the game and Kenley Jansen picked up his second career save in the Dodgers' 3–1 victory in the opener. In the next game, John Ely allowed four runs and six walks in 5 1/3 innings as the Dodgers lost the game 5–2 to the Diamondbacks. In the next game, Chad Billingsley allowed only one run on four hits in seven innings while striking out a career-high 13 batters. Rod Barajas's two-run homer in the top of the eighth staked the Dodgers to a 4–1 lead but the bullpen once more melted down in the eighth. George Sherrill allowed a two-run homer to Tony Abreu and then Jonathan Broxton served up a two-run shot to Chris Young and the Dodgers lost 5–4. The game was Broxton's seventh blown save of the season. The Dodgers next traveled to Colorado to face the Rockies. Ted Lilly halted a personal four-game losing streak by allowing one run in eight innings as the Dodgers beat the Rockies 3–1, preventing Ubaldo Jiménez from picking up his 20th win. The Dodgers officially ended the Rockies' post-season hopes the following night when they hit four home runs (including two by Casey Blake) in a 9–7 victory. Rookie Kenley Jansen picked up his third save of the season. Matt Kemp's grand slam home run helped the Dodgers defeat the Rockies 7–6 for their first series sweep in more than a month.

The Dodgers returned home to finish the season with a three-game series against the Diamondbacks. John Ely was shaky in the opener, as the Dodgers lost 7–5. The loss assured the Dodgers of their first losing record since 2005. In the following game, Chad Billingsley took a no-hitter into the sixth and picked up his first win since September 3 in the Dodgers 3–2 victory. The Dodgers ended their season with a 3–1 victory in the finale. Matt Kemp became the first Dodger to homer in five straight games since Shawn Green in 2001. Hong-Chih Kuo pitched a scoreless ninth for the save, also breaking Éric Gagné's single-season Dodger ERA record in the process. The game was the final appearance for backup catcher Brad Ausmus and Manager Joe Torre, both retiring after the game.

=== Game log ===
2010 Game Log
April (9–14)

#	Date	Opponent	Score	Win	Loss	Save	Attendance	Record
1	April 5	@ Pirates	5–11	Duke (1–0)	Padilla (0–1)		39,024	0–1
2	April 7	@ Pirates	3–4 (10)	Donnelly (1–0)	Ortiz (0–1)		31,061	0–2
3	April 8	@ Pirates	10–2	Billingsley (1–0)	Maholm (0–1)		9,352	1–2
4	April 9	@ Marlins	7–3	Kuroda (1–0)	Volstad (0–1)		40,666	2–2
5	April 10	@ Marlins	6–7	Veras (1–0)	Sherrill (0–1)		25,308	2–3
6	April 11	@ Marlins	5–6	Hensley (1–0)	Weaver (0–1)	Núñez (2)	18,758	2–4
7	April 13	Diamondbacks	9–5	Kershaw (1–0)	Kennedy (0–1)		56,000	3–4
8	April 14	Diamondbacks	7–9 (11)	Rosales (1–0)	Ortiz (0–1)		44,621	3–5
9	April 15	Diamondbacks	6–5 (10)	Broxton (1–0)	Boyer (1–1)		39,697	4–5
10	April 16	Giants	10–8	Padilla (1–1)	Wellemeyer (0–2)		49,319	5–5
11	April 17	Giants	0–9	Lincecum (3–0)	Haeger (0–1)		44,734	5–6
12	April 18	Giants	2–1	Troncoso (1–0)	Romo (0–1)	Broxton (1)	50,433	6–6
13	April 20	@ Reds	9–11	Lincoln (1–0)	Troncoso (1–1)	Cordero (5)	12,965	6–7
14	April 21	@ Reds	14–6	Kuroda (2–0)	Harang (0–3)		12,203	7–7
15	April 22	@ Reds	5–8	Leake (1–0)	Kuo (0–1)	Cordero (6)	13,261	7–8
16	April 23	@ Nationals	1–5	Atilano (1–0)	Haeger (0–2)		23,859	7–9
17	April 24	@ Nationals	4–3 (13)	Monasterios (1–0)	Batista (0–2)		18,039	8–9
18	April 25	@ Nationals	0–1	Olsen (1–1)	Billingsley (1–1)	Capps (8)	18,395	8–10
–	April 26	@ Mets	Postponed (rain) Rescheduled for April 27					8–10
19	April 27	@ Mets	0–4	Santana (3–1)	Kuroda (2–1)		N/A	8–11
20	April 27	@ Mets	5–10	Takahashi (2–1)	Haeger (0–3)		32,012	8–12
21	April 28	@ Mets	3–7	Maine (1–1)	Ely (0–1)		29,724	8–13
22	April 29	Pirates	0–2	Burres (1–1)	Kershaw (1–1)	Meek (1)	40,185	8–14
23	April 30	Pirates	6–2	Billingsley (2–1)	Morton (0–5)		46,775	9–14

May (20–8)

#	Date	Opponent	Score	Win	Loss	Save	Attendance	Record
24	May 1	Pirates	5–1	Ortiz (1–1)	Duke (2–3)		40,483	10–14
25	May 2	Pirates	9–3	Kuroda (3–1)	Karstens (0–1)		39,339	11–14
26	May 4	Brewers	6–11	Narveson (2–0)	Kershaw (1–2)		50,714	11–15
27	May 5	Brewers	3–11	Davis (1–3)	Billingsley (2–2)		35,659	11–16
28	May 6	Brewers	7–3	Broxton (2–0)	Hawkins (0–3)		38,456	12–16
29	May 7	Rockies	6–5	Weaver (1–1)	Daley (0–1)	Broxton (2)	40,567	13–16
30	May 8	Rockies	0–8	Chacín (2–0)	Haeger (0–4)		42,287	13–17
31	May 9	Rockies	2–0	Kershaw (2–2)	Jiménez (6–1)	Broxton (3)	40,718	14–17
32	May 10	@ Diamondbacks	7–3	Billingsley (3–2)	López (1–2)		19,863	15–17
33	May 11	@ Diamondbacks	13–3	Ely (1–1)	Haren (4–2)		21,030	16–17
34	May 12	@ Diamondbacks	6–3	Kuroda (4–1)	Jackson (1–5)	Broxton (4)	22,714	17–17
35	May 14	@ Padres	4–3	Weaver (2–1)	Gregerson (0–1)	Broxton (5)	42,056	18–17
36	May 15	@ Padres	4–1	Kershaw (3–2)	Correia (4–3)	Broxton (6)	42,436	19–17
37	May 16	@ Padres	1–0	Billingsley (4–2)	LeBlanc (2–1)	Broxton (7)	42,327	20–17
38	May 17	Astros	6–2	Ely (2–1)	Rodríguez (2–5)		35,282	21–17
39	May 18	Astros	7–3	Kuroda (5–1)	Norris (2–5)		55,662	22–17
40	May 19	Padres	5–10	Garland (5–2)	Ortiz (1–2)		40,138	22–18
41	May 20	Padres	4–1	Kershaw (4–2)	Correia (4–4)	Broxton (8)	38,856	23–18
42	May 21	Tigers	4–1	Billingsley (5–2)	Willis (1–2)	Broxton (9)	44,282	24–18
43	May 22	Tigers	6–4	Ely (3–1)	Galarraga (1–1)	Broxton (10)	45,117	25–18
44	May 23	Tigers	2–6	Porcello (4–4)	Kuroda (5–2)		46,053	25–19
45	May 25	@ Cubs	0–3	Dempster (3–4)	Kershaw (4–3)	Mármol (10)	34,749	25–20
46	May 26	@ Cubs	8–5	Billingsley (6–2)	Gorzelanny (2–5)	Broxton (11)	35,828	26–20
47	May 27	@ Cubs	0–1	Marshall (5–1)	Ely (3–2)	Mármol (11)	33,868	26–21
48	May 28	@ Rockies	5–4	Monasterios (2–0)	Francis (1–1)	Broxton (12)	40,162	27–21
49	May 29	@ Rockies	3–11	Cook (2–3)	Kuroda (5–3)		43,261	27–22
50	May 30	@ Rockies	4–3	Kershaw (5–3)	Chacín (3–3)	Broxton (13)	48,682	28–22
51	May 31	Diamondbacks	5–4	Broxton (3–0)	Vásquez (0–1)		45,325	29–22

June (14–13)

#	Date	Opponent	Score	Win	Loss	Save	Attendance	Record
52	June 1	Diamondbacks	1–0 (10)	Weaver (3–1)	Gutiérrez (0–5)		36,533	30–22
53	June 2	Diamondbacks	1–0 (14)	Schlichting (1–0)	Valdez (1–2)		35,355	31–22
54	June 3	Braves	3–4	Medlen (3–1)	Kuroda (5–4)	Venters (1)	35,333	31–23
55	June 4	Braves	5–4	Kuo (1–1)	Kawakami (0–8)	Broxton (14)	42,459	32–23
56	June 5	Braves	3–9	Hanson (6–3)	Billingsley (6–3)		48,207	32–24
57	June 6	Braves	5–4 (11)	Belisario (1–0)	Chavez (0–1)		37,944	33–24
58	June 7	Cardinals	12–4	Monasterios (3–0)	Hawksworth (0–3)		44,876	34–24
59	June 8	Cardinals	1–0	Kuo (2–1)	Miller (0–1)	Broxton (15)	48,046	35–24
60	June 9	Cardinals	4–3	Kershaw (6–3)	Wainwright (8–4)	Broxton (16)	43,299	36–24
61	June 11	Angels	1–10	Piñeiro (5–6)	Billingsley (6–4)		52,407	36–25
62	June 12	Angels	2–4	Kazmir (6–5)	Ely (3–3)	Fuentes (9)	52,806	36–26
63	June 13	Angels	5–6	Weaver (6–3)	Monasterios (3–1)	Fuentes (10)	52,776	36–27
64	June 15	@ Reds	12–0	Kuroda (6–4)	Harang (5–6)		22,639	37–27
65	June 16	@ Reds	6–2	Kershaw (7–3)	Leake (5–1)	Kuo (1)	23,083	38–27
66	June 17	@ Reds	1–7	Arroyo (6–3)	Ely (3–4)		25,585	38–28
67	June 18	@ Red Sox	6–10	Doubront (1–0)	Monasterios (3–2)	Bard (3)	37,723	38–29
68	June 19	@ Red Sox	4–5	Papelbon (2–3)	Belisario (1–1)		37,454	38–30
69	June 20	@ Red Sox	0–2	Buchholz (10–4)	Kuroda (6–5)	Papelbon (16)	37,430	38–31
70	June 22	@ Angels	3–6	Santana (7–5)	Kershaw (7–4)	Fuentes (11)	41,595	38–32
71	June 23	@ Angels	1–2	Piñeiro (7–6)	Ely (3–5)	Fuentes (12)	41,001	38–33
72	June 24	@ Angels	10–6	Weaver (4–1)	Kazmir (7–6)		44,043	39–33
73	June 25	Yankees	1–2	Sabathia (9–3)	Padilla (1–2)	Rivera (17)	56,000	39–34
74	June 26	Yankees	9–4	Kuroda (7–5)	Burnett (6–7)		56,000	40–34
75	June 27	Yankees	6–8 (10)	Rivera (2–1)	Troncoso (1–2)		56,000	40–35
76	June 28	@ Giants	4–2	Weaver (5–1)	Casilla (1–2)	Kuo (2)	34,626	41–35
77	June 29	@ Giants	4–2	Ely (4–5)	Cain (6–7)	Belisario (1)	35,289	42–35
78	June 30	@ Giants	8–2	Padilla (2–2)	Sánchez (6–6)		39,962	43–35

July (11–15)

#	Date	Opponent	Score	Win	Loss	Save	Attendance	Record
79	July 2	@ Diamondbacks	5–12	Jackson (6–6)	Kuroda (7–6)		23,155	43–36
80	July 3	@ Diamondbacks	14–1	Kershaw (8–4)	López (4–7)		44,169	44–36
81	July 4	@ Diamondbacks	3–1	Kuo (3–1)	Heilman (2–3)	Broxton (17)	26,517	45–36
82	July 5	Marlins	5–6	Robertson (6–6)	Ely (4–6)	Núñez (18)	47,801	45–37
83	July 6	Marlins	7–3	Padilla (3–2)	Volstad (4–8)	Broxton (18)	41,575	46–37
84	July 7	Marlins	0–4	Johnson (9–3)	Kuroda (7–7)		41,947	46–38
85	July 8	Cubs	3–2	Kershaw (9–4)	Wells (4–7)	Broxton (19)	43,640	47–38
86	July 9	Cubs	9–7	Billingsley (7–4)	Lilly (3–8)		43,790	48–38
87	July 10	Cubs	3–7	Gorzelanny (4–5)	Ely (4–7)		49,016	48–39
88	July 11	Cubs	7–0	Padilla (4–2)	Silva (9–3)		45,398	49–39
89	July 15	@ Cardinals	1–7	Carpenter (10–3)	Kershaw (9–5)		41,771	49–40
90	July 16	@ Cardinals	4–8	McClellan (1–2)	Billingsley (7–5)		44,074	49–41
91	July 17	@ Cardinals	0–2	Wainwright (14–5)	Kuroda (7–8)	Franklin (17)	43,667	49–42
92	July 18	@ Cardinals	4–5	Franklin (4–1)	Broxton (3–1)		40,743	49–43
93	July 19	Giants	2–5	Bumgarner (3–2)	McDonald (0–1)	Wilson (26)	45,056	49–44
94	July 20	Giants	5–7	Casilla (3–2)	Broxton (3–2)	Affeldt (3)	53,381	49–45
95	July 21	Giants	2–0	Billingsley (8–5)	Zito (8–5)		45,151	50–45
96	July 22	Mets	2–0	Kuroda (8–8)	Takahashi (7–5)	Kuo (3)	42,299	51–45
97	July 23	Mets	1–6	Santana (8–5)	Padilla (4–3)		44,626	51–46
98	July 24	Mets	3–2 (13)	Sherrill (1–1)	Pérez (0–4)		43,506	52–46
99	July 25	Mets	1–0	Kershaw (10–5)	Feliciano (2–5)	Jansen (1)	39,897	53–46
100	July 27	@ Padres	2–0	Billingsley (9–5)	Garland (9–7)	Broxton (20)	38,428	54–46
101	July 28	@ Padres	1–6	Richard (8–5)	Kuroda (8–9)		40,188	54–47
102	July 29	@ Padres	2–3	Bell (5–0)	Sherrill (1–2)		42,075	54–48
103	July 30	@ Giants	5–6	Lincecum (11–4)	Monasterios (3–3)	Ray (1)	42,847	54–49
104	July 31	@ Giants	1–2	Mota (1–3)	Broxton (3–3)		42,882	54–50

August (14–15)

#	Date	Opponent	Score	Win	Loss	Save	Attendance	Record
105	August 1	@ Giants	0–2	Cain (9–8)	Kershaw (10–6)	Wilson (31)	42,922	54–51
106	August 2	Padres	5–10	Richard (9–5)	Kuroda (8–10)		40,860	54–52
107	August 3	Padres	2–1	Lilly (4–8)	Latos (11–5)	Broxton (21)	38,886	55–52
108	August 4	Padres	9–0	Padilla (5–3)	LeBlanc (5–10)		48,988	56–52
109	August 5	Padres	0–5	Correia (8–7)	Billingsley (9–6)	Bell (31)	44,739	56–53
110	August 6	Nationals	3–6	Lannan (3–5)	Kershaw (10–7)	Storen (1)	39,153	56–54
111	August 7	Nationals	3–2 (10)	Broxton (4–3)	Burnett (0–6)		44,896	57–54
112	August 8	Nationals	8–3	Lilly (5–8)	Marquis (0–4)		43,639	58–54
113	August 10	@ Phillies	15–9	Padilla (6–3)	Kendrick (7–5)		44,881	59–54
114	August 11	@ Phillies	0–2	Oswalt (7–13)	Billingsley (9–7)	Lidge (15)	45,144	59–55
115	August 12	@ Phillies	9–10	Báez (3–3)	Broxton (4–4)		44,819	59–56
116	August 13	@ Braves	0–1	Hudson (14–5)	Kuroda (8–11)	Wagner (29)	38,602	59–57
117	August 14	@ Braves	2–1	Lilly (6–8)	Lowe (11–10)	Kuo (4)	49,267	60–57
118	August 15	@ Braves	1–13	Jurrjens (5–4)	Padilla (6–4)		28,105	60–58
119	August 16	@ Braves	3–4	Moylan (4–2)	Kuo (3–2)		20,414	60–59
120	August 17	Rockies	6–0	Kershaw (11–7)	Chacín (5–9)		49,540	61–59
121	August 18	Rockies	2–3 (10)	Betancourt (3–1)	Dotel (2–3)	Street (9)	44,268	61–60
122	August 19	Rockies	2–0	Lilly (7–8)	de la Rosa (4–4)		45,104	62–60
123	August 20	Reds	1–3	Bailey (3–2)	Monasterios (3–4)	Cordero (33)	46,418	62–61
124	August 21	Reds	8–5	Billingsley (10–7)	Cueto (11–4)	Broxton (22)	49,435	63–61
125	August 22	Reds	2–5	Arroyo (14–7)	Kershaw (11–8)	Cordero (34)	44,788	63–62
126	August 24	@ Brewers	5–3	Lilly (8–8)	Bush (6–11)	Kuo (5)	39,055	64–62
127	August 25	@ Brewers	5–4	Kuroda (9–11)	Wolf (10–10)	Dotel (22)	30,545	65–62
128	August 26	@ Brewers	7–1	Belisario (2–1)	Gallardo (11–6)		32,333	66–62
129	August 27	@ Rockies	6–2	Broxton (5–4)	Jiménez (17–5)	Kuo (6)	41,964	67–62
130	August 28	@ Rockies	3–5	Chacín (7–9)	Billingsley (10–8)		45,322	67–63
131	August 29	@ Rockies	5–10	Hammel (9–7)	Lilly (8–9)		38,343	67–64
132	August 30	Phillies	3–0	Kuroda (10–11)	Halladay (16–10)	Kuo (7)	44,896	68–64
133	August 31	Phillies	4–8	Kendrick (9–7)	Monasterios (3–5)		45,164	68–65

September/October (12–17)

#	Date	Opponent	Score	Win	Loss	Save	Attendance	Record
134	September 1	Phillies	1–5	Oswalt (10–13)	Kershaw (11–9)		37,080	68–66
135	September 3	Giants	4–2	Billingsley (11–8)	Zito (8–11)	Kuo (8)	43,046	69–66
136	September 4	Giants	4–5	López (4–2)	Broxton (5–5)	Wilson (39)	48,220	69–67
137	September 5	Giants	0–3	Sánchez (10–8)	Kuroda (10–12)	Wilson (40)	43,758	69–68
138	September 6	@ Padres	2–4	Adams (3–1)	Padilla (6–5)	Bell (38)	23,574	69–69
139	September 7	@ Padres	1–2	Latos (14–5)	Kershaw (11–10)	Bell (39)	20,071	69–70
140	September 8	@ Padres	0–4	Luebke (1–1)	Billingsley (11–9)	Gregerson (2)	20,851	69–71
141	September 9	@ Astros	2–3	Norris (7–8)	Lilly (8–10)	Lyon (14)	28,081	69–72
142	September 10	@ Astros	4–2 (11)	Dotel (3–3)	Abad (0–1)		31,010	70–72
143	September 11	@ Astros	6–3	Jansen (1–0)	Lyon (6–6)	Kuo (9)	39,237	71–72
144	September 12	@ Astros	4–7	Chacín (2–2)	Troncoso (1–3)	Lyon (15)	30,240	71–73
145	September 14	@ Giants	1–0	Kershaw (12–10)	Zito (8–13)		36,076	72–73
146	September 15	@ Giants	1–2	Cain (12–10)	Billingsley (11–10)	Wilson (43)	34,685	72–74
147	September 16	@ Giants	2–10	Sánchez (11–8)	Lilly (8–11)		38,434	72–75
148	September 17	Rockies	5–7	Jiménez (19–6)	Kuroda (10–13)	Street (20)	38,449	72–76
149	September 18	Rockies	2–12	Chacín (9–9)	Ely (4–8)		40,191	72–77
150	September 19	Rockies	7–6 (11)	Sherrill (2–2)	Delcarmen (0–2)		37,402	73–77
151	September 21	Padres	0–6	Richard (13–8)	Billingsley (11–11)		44,166	73–78
152	September 22	Padres	1–3	Stauffer (5–4)	Lilly (8–12)	Bell (43)	33,728	73–79
153	September 23	Padres	3–1	Kuroda (11–13)	Latos (14–8)	Kuo (10)	33,040	74–79
154	September 24	@ Diamondbacks	3–1	Kershaw (13–10)	Enright (6–6)	Jansen (2)	38,516	75–79
155	September 25	@ Diamondbacks	2–5	Hudson (7–1)	Ely (4–9)	Gutiérrez (13)	41,477	75–80
156	September 26	@ Diamondbacks	4–5	Demel (2–1)	Broxton (5–6)	Gutiérrez (14)	37,911	75–81
157	September 27	@ Rockies	3–1	Lilly (9–12)	Jiménez (19–8)	Kuo (11)	32,085	76–81
158	September 28	@ Rockies	9–7	Belisario (3–1)	Dotel (3–4)	Jansen (3)	34,430	77–81
159	September 29	@ Rockies	7–6	Troncoso (2–3)	Chacín (9–11)	Belisario (2)	33,296	78–81
160	October 1	Diamondbacks	5–7	Kroenke (1–0)	Ely (4–10)	Gutiérrez (15)	36,713	78–82
161	October 2	Diamondbacks	3–2	Billingsley (12–11)	Saunders (3–7)	Jansen (4)	41,918	79–82
162	October 3	Diamondbacks	3–1	Lilly (10–12)	López (7–16)	Kuo (12)	38,007	80–82

== Roster ==
2010 Los Angeles Dodgers
Roster
Pitchers: 54 Ronald Belisario; 58 Chad Billingsley; 51 Jonathan Broxton; 26 Octavio Dotel; 57 Scott Elbert; 48 John Ely; 49 Charlie Haeger; 74 Kenley Jansen; 22 Clayton Kershaw; 56 Hong-Chih Kuo; 18 Hiroki Kuroda; 29 Ted Lilly; 50 Jon Link; 31 James McDonald; 45 Justin Miller; 37 Carlos Monasterios; 35 Ramón Ortiz; 48 Russ Ortiz; 44 Vicente Padilla; 59 Travis Schlichting; 52 George Sherrill; 35 Jack Taschner; 38 Ramón Troncoso; 36 Jeff Weaver	Catchers: 12 Brad Ausmus; 28 Rod Barajas; 17 A. J. Ellis; 55 Russell Martin; Infielders: 3 Ronnie Belliard; 23 Casey Blake; 14 Jamey Carroll; 33 Juan Castro; 33 Blake DeWitt; 15 Rafael Furcal; 21 Nick Green; 60 Chin-lung Hu; 35 John Lindsey; 7 James Loney; 9 Russ Mitchell; 13 Ryan Theriot	Outfielders: 9 Garret Anderson; 16 Andre Ethier; 31 Jay Gibbons; 5 Reed Johnson; 27 Matt Kemp; 49 Trent Oeltjen; 3 Xavier Paul; 21 Scott Podsednik; 99 Manny Ramirez	Manager: 6 Joe Torre; Coaches: 10 Larry Bowa (third base); 25 Mariano Duncan (1st base); 40 Rick Honeycutt (pitching); 43 Ken Howell (bullpen); 8 Don Mattingly (hitting); 11 Manny Mota; 46 Bob Schaefer (bench)

== Player stats ==
Team leaders in each category are in bold.

=== Batting ===
Note: G = Games played; AB = At bats; R = Runs; H = Hits; 2B = Doubles; 3B = Triples; HR = Home runs; RBI = Runs batted in; TB = Total bases; BB = Walks; SO = Strikeouts; SB = Stolen bases; OBP = On-base percentage; SLG = Slugging; Avg. = Batting average

Player	G	AB	R	H	2B	3B	HR	RBI	TB	BB	SO	SB	OBP	SLG	AVG
Matt Kemp	**162**	**602**	**82**	150	25	6	**28**	**89**	**271**	53	**170**	19	.310	.450	.249
James Loney	161	588	67	**157**	**41**	2	10	88	232	52	95	10	.329	.395	.267
Andre Ethier	139	517	71	151	33	1	23	82	255	**59**	102	2	**.364**	**.493**	**.292**
Casey Blake	146	509	56	126	28	1	17	64	207	48	138	0	.320	.407	.248
Rafael Furcal	97	383	66	115	23	**7**	8	43	176	40	60	**22**	.366	.460	.300
Jamey Carroll	133	351	48	102	15	1	0	23	119	51	64	12	.379	.339	.291
Russell Martin	97	331	45	82	13	0	5	26	110	48	61	6	.347	.332	.248
Blake DeWitt	82	256	29	69	15	4	1	30	95	30	49	2	.352	.371	.270
Manny Ramirez	66	196	32	61	15	0	8	40	100	32	38	1	.405	.510	.311
Reed Johnson	102	202	24	53	11	2	2	15	74	5	50	2	.291	.366	.262
Ryan Theriot	54	198	27	48	5	0	1	8	56	22	28	4	.323	.283	.242
Ronnie Belliard	82	162	24	35	10	1	2	19	53	18	35	2	.295	.327	.216
Garret Anderson	80	155	8	28	6	1	2	12	42	5	34	1	.204	.271	.181
Scott Podsednik	39	149	17	39	6	1	1	7	50	11	26	5	.313	.336	.262
Xavier Paul	44	121	16	28	8	1	0	11	38	8	24	3	.277	.314	.231
A. J. Ellis	44	108	6	30	5	0	0	16	35	14	18	0	.363	.324	.278
Jay Gibbons	37	75	11	21	2	0	5	17	38	4	14	0	.313	.507	.280
Rod Barajas	25	64	9	19	3	0	5	13	37	5	15	0	.361	.578	.297
Brad Ausmus	21	63	4	14	2	0	0	2	16	7	15	0	.310	.254	.222
Russ Mitchell	15	42	3	6	0	0	2	4	12	0	8	0	.140	.286	.143
Chin-lung Hu	13	23	2	3	1	0	0	1	4	0	5	1	.160	.174	.130
Trent Oeltjen	13	22	5	5	1	1	0	1	8	4	8	0	.370	.364	.227
John Lindsey	10	12	0	1	0	0	0	0	1	0	3	0	.154	.083	.083
Nick Green	5	8	0	1	0	0	0	1	1	0	2	0	.222	.125	.125
Juan Castro	1	3	0	0	0	0	0	0	0	1	2	0	.250	.000	.000
Pitcher totals	162	285	15	24	2	0	0	9	26	16	120	0	.135	.091	.084
**Team totals**	**162**	**5426**	**667**	**1368**	**270**	**29**	**120**	**621**	**2056**	**533**	**1184**	**92**	**.322**	**.379**	**.252**

=== Pitching ===
Note: W = Wins; L = Losses; ERA = Earned run average; G = Games pitched; GS = Games started; SV = Saves; IP = Innings pitched; R = Runs allowed; ER = Earned runs allowed; BB = Walks allowed; K = Strikeouts

Player	W	L	ERA	G	GS	SV	IP	H	R	ER	BB	K
Clayton Kershaw	**13**	10	**2.91**	32	**32**	0	**204.1**	160	73	66	**81**	**212**
Hiroki Kuroda	11	**13**	3.39	31	31	0	196.1	**180**	**87**	74	48	159
Chad Billingsley	12	11	3.57	31	31	0	191.2	176	82	**76**	69	171
John Ely	4	10	5.49	18	18	0	100.0	105	63	61	40	76
Vicente Padilla	6	5	4.07	16	16	0	95.0	79	46	43	24	84
Carlos Monasterios	3	5	4.38	32	13	0	88.1	99	48	43	29	52
Ted Lilly	7	4	3.52	12	12	0	76.2	61	30	30	15	77
Jonathan Broxton	5	6	4.04	64	0	**22**	62.1	64	30	28	28	73
Hong-Chih Kuo	3	2	1.20	56	0	12	60.0	29	8	8	18	73
Ronald Belisario	3	1	5.04	59	0	2	55.1	52	31	31	19	38
Ramón Troncoso	2	3	4.33	52	0	0	54.0	55	28	26	18	34
Jeff Weaver	5	1	6.09	43	0	0	44.1	48	30	30	20	26
George Sherrill	2	2	6.69	**65**	0	0	36.1	46	28	27	24	25
Charlie Haeger	0	4	8.40	9	6	0	30.0	36	32	28	26	30
Ramón Ortiz	1	2	6.30	16	2	0	30.0	33	22	21	16	21
Kenley Jansen	1	0	0.67	25	0	4	27.0	12	2	2	15	41
Justin Miller	0	0	4.44	19	0	0	24.1	22	12	12	8	30
Travis Schlichting	1	0	3.57	14	0	0	22.2	20	9	9	10	14
Octavio Dotel	1	1	3.38	19	0	1	18.2	11	7	7	11	21
Jon Link	0	0	4.15	9	0	0	8.2	12	7	4	4	4
James McDonald	0	1	8.22	4	1	0	7.2	11	7	7	5	7
Russ Ortiz	0	1	10.29	6	0	0	7.0	10	8	8	5	6
Scott Elbert	0	0	13.50	1	0	0	0.2	1	1	1	3	0
Jack Taschner	0	0	27.00	3	0	0	0.1	1	1	1	3	0
**Team totals**	**80**	**82**	**4.01**	**162**	**162**	**41**	**1441.2**	**1323**	**692**	**643**	**539**	**1274**

== Awards and honors ==
- 2010 Major League Baseball All-Star Game
  - Andre Ethier starter
  - Jonathan Broxton reserve
  - Rafael Furcal reserve
  - Hong-Chih Kuo reserve
- National League Player of the Week
  - Rafael Furcal June 28 – July 4

== Notable Transactions ==
- July 28, 2010, acquired Scott Podsednik from the Kansas City Royals for Lucas May and Elisaul Pimentel.
- On July 31, 2010, acquired Ted Lilly and Ryan Theriot from the Chicago Cubs for Blake DeWitt, Brett Wallach and Kyle Smit.
- On July 31, 2010, acquired Octavio Dotel from the Pittsburgh Pirates for James McDonald and Andrew Lambo.
- On August 30, 2010, Manny Ramirez was claimed off waivers by the Chicago White Sox
- On September 18, 2010, acquired a player to be named later (Anthony Jackson) from the Colorado Rockies for Octavio Dotel.

== Farm system ==
Level	Team	League	Manager	W	L	Position
AAA	Albuquerque Isotopes	Pacific Coast League	Tim Wallach	72	71	2nd Place
AA	Chattanooga Lookouts	Southern League	Carlos Subero	65	74	4th Place
High A	Inland Empire 66ers	California League	Jeff Carter	50	90	Last Place
A	Great Lakes Loons	Midwest League	Juan Bustabad	90	49	First Place; Lost in 2nd round of playoffs
Rookie	Ogden Raptors	Pioneer League	Damon Berryhill	44	31	First Place; Lost in League Championship
Rookie	Arizona League Dodgers	Arizona League	Lorenzo Bundy	30	25	3rd Place
Rookie	DSL Dodgers	Dominican Summer League	Pedro Mega	40	31	3rd Place

=== Minor League statistical leaders ===
==== Batting ====
- Average: Jake Lemmerman – Ogden – .363
- Home Runs: Jerry Sands – Chattanooga – 35
- RBI: John Lindsey – Albuquerque – 97
- OBP: Jake Lemmerman – Ogden – .434
- SLG: Nick Akins – Ogden – .694

==== Pitching ====
- ERA: Allen Webster – Great Lakes – 2.88
- Wins:
  Alberto Bastardo – Chattanooga – 12
  Allen Webster – Great Lakes – 12
- Strikeouts: Josh Wall– Great Lakes – 151
- Saves: Luis Vasquez – Great Lakes – 20
- WHIP:Matt Magill – Great Lakes – 1.10

==== Mid-Season All-Stars ====
- Pacific Coast League All-Stars

OF Jay Gibbons
1B John Lindsey
Catcher Lucas May

- Southern League All-Stars

3B Corey Smith
OF Trayvon Robinson
SS Dee Gordon
Pitcher Jesus Castillo
Pitcher Kenley Jansen

- California League All-Stars

Pitcher Nathan Eovaldi

- Midwest League All-Stars

1B Jerry Sands
SS Christian Lara
IF Rafael Ynoa
OF Angelo Songco
Pitcher Will Savage
Pitcher Luis Vasquez
Pitcher Allen Webster.

Lara won the skills competition preceding the game and Sands homered in the game and was selected as its Most Valuable Player.

- All-Star Futures Game

SS Dee Gordon (U.S. team)
3B Pedro Báez (World team)

==== Post-Season All-Stars ====
- Pacific Coast League All-Stars

1B John Lindsey
3B Russ Mitchell

- Southern League All-Stars

DH Corey Smith

- Midwest League All-Stars

OF Blake Smith
OF Brian Cavazos-Galvez
Manager of the Year Juan Bustabad

- Pioneer League All-Stars

SS Jake Lemmerman (also league MVP)
Pitcher Red Patterson
Pitcher Shawn Tolleson

=== Minor League notes ===
- The Class-A Great Lakes Loons finished the season with the best record in all of Minor League Baseball at 90–49 but lost in the second round of the Midwest League playoffs to the Lake County Captains.
- The Rookie-class Ogden Raptors advanced to the Pioneer League championship series before dropping the series in two games to the Helena Brewers.
- Don Mattingly, the 2010 Dodgers batting coach and 2011 manager was chosen to manage the Phoenix Desert Dogs in the Arizona Fall League. eight Dodgers prospects were selected to play for the Desert Dogs team: RHP Javy Guerra, RHP Jon Link, RHP Justin Miller, C Matt Wallach, INF Iván DeJesús, Jr., OF Trayvon Robinson and 1B/OF Jerry Sands.
- 1B/OF Jerry Sands was selected as the Dodgers "Minor League Player of the Year" and pitcher Rubby De La Rosa was selected as the Dodgers "Minor League Pitcher of the Year." Both of them split the season between the Class-A Great Lakes Loons and Class-AA Chattanooga Lookouts.

== Major League Baseball draft ==
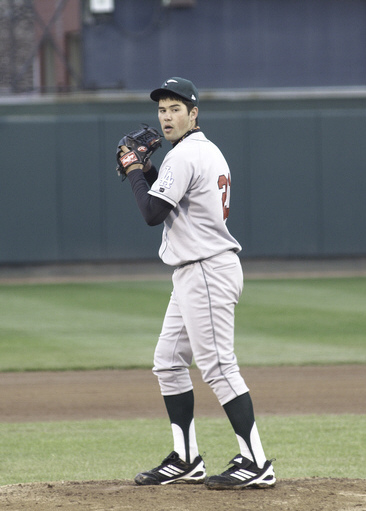
Zach Lee

The Dodgers selected 50 players in this draft. Of those, eight of them have played Major League Baseball.

The first pick of this draft was right handed pitcher Zach Lee from McKinney High School. Lee appeared in only one game for the Dodgers, making a spot start on July 25, 2015, against the New York Mets, and allowed seven runs in only 4 2/3 innings. He was traded the following season and remained in professional baseball through the 2022 season, though he only played in four major league games.

2010 draft picks

Round	Name	Position	School	Signed	Career span	Highest level
1	Zach Lee	RHP	McKinney High School	Yes	2011–2022	MLB
2	Ralston Cash	RHP	Lakeview Academy	Yes	2010–2018	AAA
3	Leon Landry	CF	Louisiana State University	Yes	2010–2017	AAA
4	James Baldwin	CF	Pinecrest High School	Yes	2010–2015	A+
5	Jake Lemmerman	SS	Duke University	Yes	2010–2014	AAA
6	Kevin Gausman	RHP	Grandview High School	No; Orioles-2012	2012–present	MLB
7	Ryan Christenson	LHP	South Mountain Community College	Yes	2010–2011	A
8	Blake Dean	1B	Louisiana State University	Yes	2010–2011	A
9	Steve Domecus	C	Virginia Polytechnic Institute and State University	Yes	2010–2013	A+
10	Bobby Coyle	LF	California State University, Fresno	Yes	2010–2016	AA
11	Joc Pederson	CF	Palo Alto High School	Yes	2010–present	MLB
12	Matt Kirkland	3B	South Doyle High School	Yes	2010–2011	Rookie
13	Jesse Bosnik	3B	St. Bonaventure University	Yes	2010–2012	A
14	Alex McRee	LHP	University of Georgia	Yes	2010	Rookie
15	Jake Eliopoulos	LHP	Chipola College	No		
16	Andrew Pevsner	LHP	Johns Hopkins University	Yes	2010–2012	A
17	Logan Bawcom	RHP	University of Texas at Arlington	Yes	2010–2020	AAA
18	Chad Arnold	RHP	Washington State University	No		
19	Ben Carhart	3B	Palm Beach Community College	No; Cubs-2012	2012–2016	AAA
20	Austin Henderson	RHP	Flower Mound High School	No		
21	Noel Cuevas	CF	Universidad Interamericana	Yes	2010–2021	MLB
22	Andre Wheeler	RF	L. C. Anderson High School	No; White Sox-2013	2013–2017	AA
23	BJ Larosa	C	Bucknell University	Yes	2010–2011	A+
24	Andrew Edge	C	Jacksonville State University	Yes	2010–2013	A
25	Chance Gilmore	LF	Coastal Carolina University	Yes	2010–2012	Rookie
26	Scott Schebler	LF	Des Moines Area Community College	Yes	2010–2021	MLB
27	Yimi Queipo-Rodriguez	RHP	Peru State College	Yes	2010–2011	Rookie
28	Michael Drowne	CF	Sacred Heart University	Yes	2010–2012	A
29	Red Patterson	RHP	Southwestern Oklahoma State University	Yes	2010–2016	MLB
30	Shawn Tolleson	RHP	Baylor University	Yes	2010–2016	MLB
31	Derek Cone	RHP	Mesa Community College	Yes	2010–2012	A+
32	Devon Ethier	LF	GateWay Community College	Yes	2010–2012	Rookie
33	Brett Lee	LHP	Bishop State Community College	No; Twins-2012	2012–2019	AA
34	Joseph Lincoln	C	Missouri Southern State University	Yes	2010–2011	Rookie
35	Beau Brett	1B	University of Southern California	Yes	2010–2011	Rookie
36	John Fasola	RHP	Walsh Jesuit High School	No; Rangers-2014	2014–2021	AAA
37	Cal Vogelsang	2B	College of the Canyons	No		
38	Lucas Witt	CF	Lexington Christian Academy	No		
39	Steve Matre	RHP	College of Mount St. Joseph	Yes	2010–2013	A
40	Kaleb Clark	RHP	Riverton High School	No		
41	Kevin Williams	SS	Crespi Carmelite High School	No		
42	Miles Williams	3B	Windsor High School	No; Marlins-2013	2013–2018	A-
43	Chad Wallach	RHP	Calvary Chapel High School	No; Marlins-2013	2013–present	MLB
44	Nick Baker	RHP	Palm Desert High School	No; Diamondbacks-2014	2014–2018	AAA
45	Edmund Gallagher	SS	Louisburg College	No		
46	Bret Montgomery	RHP	California State University, Dominguez Hills	Yes	2010–2012	AAA
47	Cody Martin	1B	Chipola College	No		
48	Anthony Garcia	2B	Cesar Chavez High School	No		
49	Robert Shultz	RHP	Eastside Catholic High School	No		
50	Taylor Kaczmarek	RHP	Desert Ridge High School	No		
