= Rob Mackowiak =

American baseball player (born 1976)

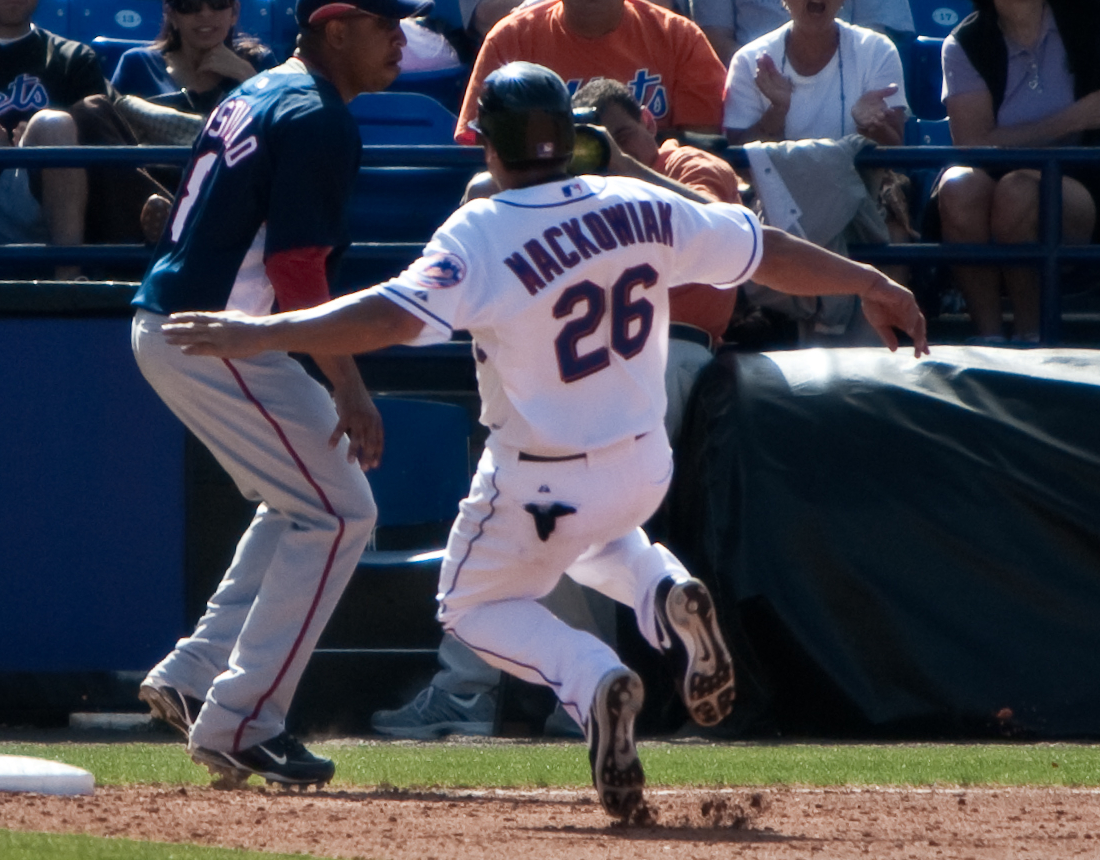
- Mackowiak with the New York Mets in 2009 spring training
- Outfielder / Third baseman
- Born: June 20, 1976 (age 50); Oak Lawn, Illinois, U.S.
- Batted: Left Threw: Right

MLB debut
- May 19, 2001, for the Pittsburgh Pirates

Last MLB appearance
- June 5, 2008, for the Washington Nationals

MLB statistics
- Batting average: .259
- Home runs: 64
- Runs batted in: 286
- Stats at Baseball Reference

Teams
- Pittsburgh Pirates (2001–2005); Chicago White Sox (2006–2007); San Diego Padres (2007); Washington Nationals (2008)

Robert William Mackowiak (/məˈkoʊviæk/; born June 20, 1976) is an American former professional baseball outfielder. During his Major League Baseball (MLB) career, he played for the Pittsburgh Pirates, Chicago White Sox, San Diego Padres, and Washington Nationals.

== Personal life ==
Mackowiak was born on June 20, 1976, in Oak Lawn, Illinois. He grew up playing baseball for Oak Lawn Community High School in Oak Lawn, Illinois, and then at Lake Central High School in St. John, Indiana, where he graduated in 1994. Mackowiak continued his baseball career by playing for South Suburban Junior College in Illinois.

== Baseball career ==
=== Minor league career ===
Mackowiak was drafted by the Cincinnati Reds in the 30th round of the 1995 amateur draft, but did not sign. In the following year's amateur draft, he was drafted in the 53rd round by the Pittsburgh Pirates, and was signed by Pirates scout Bill Bryk.

In 1996, Mackowiak spent his first professional baseball season with the Bradenton Pirates.

In 1997, Mackowiak moved on to the Erie SeaWolves, where he helped the team achieve a first-place finish. He ended up hitting the second-most doubles on the club for the season.

Mackowiak began the 1998 season with the Single-A Pirates affiliate, Augusta, before moving over to the Lynchburg Hillcats, also a Single-A ballclub. He finished the season hitting .268 with four homers and 39 RBI in 111 games with the two clubs. He was also ranked second in the Lynchburg club in triples.

1999 was another split season for the rising Mackowiak. Whereas he started the season in Lynchburg, he was promoted to the Altoona Curve where he hit safely in 15 of his first 17 games. His production fell off towards the end of the season, in which he batted a mere .208 in his final 36 games.

Mackowiak spent his entire 2000 season with Double-A Altoona. He had a good season, setting some career highs in the offensive categories. Mackowiak had no set position for the club, so he acted as a basic utilityman. He made 71 appearances at second base, 38 in right field, 23 at third base, two at shortstop, and one in left field for Altoona that season. Mackowiak was also given Player of the Month honors for the Altoona club in May.

In 2001, Mackowiak was promoted to Triple-A, playing for the Nashville Sounds where he improved his game and excelled on the fields.

=== Major League career ===
==== 2001-05, Pittsburgh Pirates ====
It was no surprise that the Pirates bought Mackowiak's contract on May 18, 2001. His Major League debut was at second base the next day against Milwaukee, where he went 0-for-3 with an intentional walk. Mackowiak's first Major League home run came off of Florida's Braden Looper at PNC Park on May 30.

2002 was Mackowiak's first full season in the majors, in which he served as a utilityman, playing 5 different positions over the course of the season.

2003 saw Mackowiak's second Opening Day start for the Pirates organization, and continuing his jack-of-all-trades status at the club, appeared at five different positions in his first 10 games (RF, CF, LF, 2B & 3B). He registered just one hit in 21 at bats (.048 batting average) before being optioned to Triple-A Nashville on June 8, 2003. Mackowiak was recalled by Pittsburgh in August, and proceeded to post a career-high four hits in his return to the Pirates line-up on August 20, against the St. Louis Cardinals.

2004 was Mackowiak's best season, as he set career highs in many offensive categories, such as a career high of 17 home runs and 75 RBI. He also had an extremely memorable double header against the Chicago Cubs on May 28, hitting a walk-off grand slam in the first game and a game-tying ninth-inning home run in the second game, all on the same day that his son was born.

==== 2006, Chicago White Sox ====
The 2006 season brought Mackowiak to the Chicago White Sox. Mackowiak was excited about playing in Chicago because it was where he grew up and still had relatives. He played as number 10, continued his utility roles at all three outfield positions, third base, and designated hitter. At one point, he boasted an 11-game hitting streak. During the season, he gained his 500th career hit.

==== 2007, Chicago White Sox and San Diego Padres ====
Mackowiak started the 2007 season with the White Sox, starting 64 games and hitting .278. At the end of July, he was traded to the San Diego Padres for minor league pitching prospect Jon Link. He played in 28 games, and finished the year with a .263 average. At the end of the season, he underwent surgery for a double sports hernia.

==== 2008, Washington National and Cincinnati Reds ====
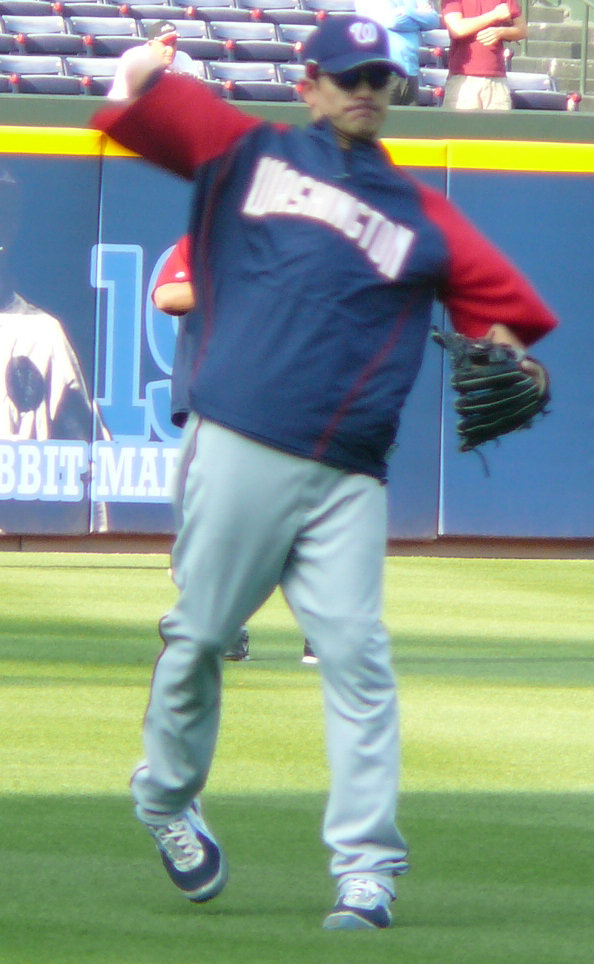
Mackowiak with the Washington Nationals in 2008.

In December 2007, Mackowiak signed with the Washington Nationals, but was released in June. He appeared in 38 games for the Nationals, hitting .132. Later in the month, he was signed by the Cincinnati Reds and sent to Triple-A Louisville.

==== 2009, New York Mets ====
Mackowiak became a free agent at the end of the season and agreed to a minor league contract with the New York Mets on January 23, 2009. He was released by the Mets on April 14.

==== Newark Bears ====
On May 8, 2009, Mackowiak signed with the Newark Bears of the Atlantic League of Professional Baseball. A month later, Cleveland signed him to play with AAA Columbus. After his release there, he rejoined the Bears in July and helped them to a playoff run, hitting .323.

==== Cleveland Indians ====
On June 6, 2009, Rob was signed by the Cleveland Indians and reported to their AAA team, the Columbus Clippers. On July 7, the Clippers released him and he rejoined the Newark Bears to finish the 2009 season.

==== Windy City Thunderbolts ====
In 2010, the Windy City ThunderBolts announced that Rob Mackowiak was hired as the team's hitting coach. The Windy City hitting coach job was Mackowiak's first coaching experience in professional baseball.

Mackowiak came out of retirement in 2010 to be the starting 3rd baseman for the Windy City Thunderbolts. He played in 113 games batting .255 19 home runs and 77 RBIs.
