= John Lindsey =

American baseball player (born 1977)

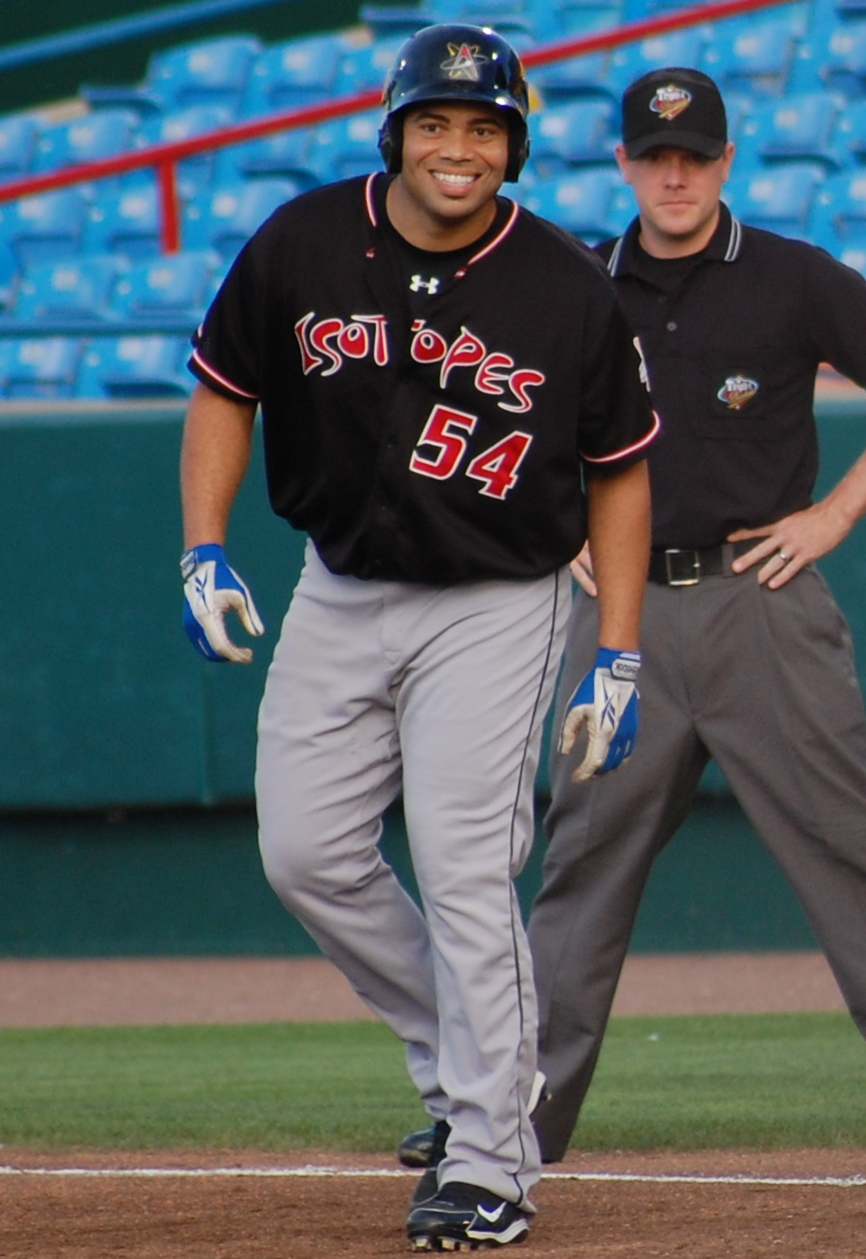
- Lindsey with the Albuquerque Isotopes in 2010
- First baseman
- Born: January 30, 1977 (age 49); Hattiesburg, Mississippi, U.S.
- Batted: Right Threw: Right

MLB debut
- September 8, 2010, for the Los Angeles Dodgers

Last MLB appearance
- October 3, 2010, for the Los Angeles Dodgers

MLB statistics
- Batting average: .083
- Home runs: 0
- Runs batted in: 0
- Stats at Baseball Reference

Teams
- Los Angeles Dodgers (2010)

John William Lindsey (born January 30, 1977) is an American former professional baseball first baseman. Lindsey is known for having spent the most time in the minor leagues (sixteen years) before making his major league debut, which he did in 2010 with the Los Angeles Dodgers.

Lindsey has also played in the Florida Marlins, Seattle Mariners, and Colorado Rockies minor league systems as well as in the independent Can-Am and Mexican leagues.

== Professional career ==
=== Colorado Rockies ===
A football and baseball star in high school in Hattiesburg, Lindsey was drafted by the Colorado Rockies in the 13th round of the 1995 Major League Baseball draft. He played in the Rockies farm system from 1995 to 2001 with stops in Portland, Asheville and Salem, never rising above Single-A.

=== Seattle Mariners ===
In 2002, he signed with the Seattle Mariners and played for the Single-A San Bernardino Stampede and the Double-A San Antonio Missions from 2002 to 2004. His best season was in 2002 with San Bernardino when he hit .297 with 22 home runs and 93 runs batted in (RBIs). Although a scout had told Lindsey early in his career that if he consistently batted .275 and hit 20 home runs he would likely reach the major leagues, Lindsey remained in the minors, in part due to his weak defensive skills.

=== New Jersey Jackals ===
Never able to move past Double-A and frustrated by a brief stint with the Florida Marlins Single-A team, the Jupiter Hammerheads, in 2005, he signed with the New Jersey Jackals of the independent Can-Am League. He played well with New Jersey, hitting .311 with 10 home runs in 69 games in 2006 before being sidelined by a leg injury during a home plate collision.

=== Los Angeles Dodgers ===
Ready to retire after the 2006 season, he went back home to Mississippi, enrolled at Pearl River Junior College and was preparing for life after baseball. Lorenzo Bundy, a former roving instructor for the Rockies during Lindsey's time there was now the manager for the Los Angeles Dodgers Triple-A team, the Las Vegas 51s and he convinced the Dodgers to bring Lindsey to spring training. He had a good spring training and the Dodgers signed him and sent him out to start the season at Double-A Jacksonville. He hit .286 with 11 home runs and 33 RBIs for the Suns and when a spot opened up with the 51s, Lindsey got his first promotion to Triple-A. He hit .333 with 19 home runs and 88 RBIs for the 51s in 77 games during the 2007 season and received a non-roster invitation to major league camp in 2008 as a result.

Lindsey spent the entire 2008 season with the Las Vegas 51s. He had one of his best seasons to date, batting .316 with 26 home runs and 100 RBIs. He was awarded the annual Mayor's Trophy based on fan voting, becoming the only player in franchise history to win the trophy in back-to-back years.

=== Florida Marlins ===
He became a free agent at the end of the season and signed a minor league contract with an invitation to spring training with the Florida Marlins in January 2009. He spent 2009 with the New Orleans Zephyrs.

=== Los Angeles Dodgers ===
Lindsey rejoined the Dodgers on a minor league contract for 2010. He was assigned to the Triple-A Albuquerque Isotopes to start the season. Lindsey was twice selected PCL Player of the Week and on May 11, tied a franchise record with five hits in a 5-for-5 performance at Colorado Springs. He hit .353 in 107 games with the Isotopes, including 25 home runs and 97 RBIs and was selected to both the mid-season and post-season Pacific Coast League all-star teams. Although his Triple-A wages and additional money from playing in the Mexican Pacific League earned Lindsey a comfortable salary "close to six figures", ESPN speculated in a long profile of the player that, had he entered baseball before or after the steroid era distorted other players' performance, "his career may have turned out completely different".

After the Isotopes' season ended in early September, Lindsey's wife was driving to him to take him home to Mississippi when on September 6, the Dodgers called Lindsey up to the major leagues for the first time, adding him to the team's 40-man roster. He had spent more time in the minors—16 years—before reaching the majors than any other active player. Lindsey made his Major League debut on September 8 against the San Diego Padres as a pinch hitter, but did not bat because the Padres made a pitching change and he was subsequently pinch hit for by Andre Ethier. His first official at-bat was the following day against the Houston Astros, when he flew out to center also as a pinch hitter. Lindsey had his first hit against the Astros on Sunday, September 12, with his family present. That was the only hit he recorded in 12 at-bats with the Dodgers in 2010 before he broke his hand when he was hit by a pitch in a game against the Arizona Diamondbacks. He was designated for assignment on March 30, 2011.

He appeared in 75 games for Albuquerque in 2011, hitting .309 with 13 homers and 49 RBIs.

=== Detroit Tigers ===
After beginning 2012 with the Vaqueros Laguna in the Mexican League, he signed with the Detroit Tigers and was assigned to the Toledo Mud Hens.

Lindsey was released by Toledo, having played his last game on April 30, 2013.

=== Independent leagues and Mexico ===
He later played in the Canadian-American Association in 2012, the Mexican Summer League in 2014 and the Mexican Pacific Winter League in 2012–2015.

== Personal ==
Lindsey and his wife Christa have a son, John III. Lindsey is nicknamed "Mayor" thanks to a name that is similar to John Lindsay, who was mayor of New York City from 1966 to 1973.
