= Dennis Mannion =

American sports executive

Dennis M. Mannion
- Born: New York
- Known for: Sports executive for MLB, NBA, NFL and NHL teams.

Dennis M. Mannion is currently CEO and President of House of 7, LLC, a sports advisory company with professional and amateur sports clients. Mannion was CEO and President of Palace Sports and Entertainment where he oversaw Business Operations of the Detroit Pistons, The Palace of Auburn Hills, DTE Energy Music Theatre, Meadow Brook Amphitheatre, and Freedom Hill Amphitheatre. He has worked in all four Major League sports: MLB, NHL, NBA, and NFL.

== Early career ==
After graduating college, Mannion began his sports management career in Major League Baseball, spending 16 years with the Philadelphia Phillies from 1982 to 1997. He would serve as Vice President of Marketing and Sales for eight seasons.

Mannion left the Phillies in 1997 for a position as Senior Vice President of Ascent Sports in Denver, Colorado. There he handled business operations for the Accent-owned NHL Colorado Avalanche and NBA Denver Nuggets. Mannion also worked on the movement of both teams games and operations to the newly built Pepsi Center.

He later worked in the NFL for the Baltimore Ravens, serving eight seasons as Senior Vice President of Business Ventures from 1999 until 2007. In November 2007, he returned to baseball with the Los Angeles Dodgers. He served as Executive Vice-President and Chief Operating Officer from November 2007 until March 2009 when he was promoted to President and CEO. During his tenure, the Dodgers led the league in game attendance, set a World Record for the largest attended baseball game in 2008 at the LA Coliseum (119,000), hosted the 2009 World Baseball Classic championship rounds, and reached the National League Championship Series two consecutive years.

With a pending change in ownership of the Dodgers organization, Mannion took the position with Palace Sports & Entertainment in 2011. Mannion’s role extended to all four PS&E operated properties – The Palace, DTE Energy Music Theatre, Meadow Brook Amphitheatre and Freedom Hill Amphitheatre.

== Personal ==
A native of Pittsburgh, Pennsylvania, Mannion graduated from the University of Massachusetts Amherst at the Isenberg School of Management in 1981 with a bachelor's degree in Business and Sports Management. He received the “Distinguished Alumnus Award” from his alma mater in 1998. Mannion and wife Pam are the parents of five children. His stepdaughter Kate Norley is married to comedian John Oliver.

Preceded by Jamie McCourt	President of the Los Angeles Dodgers; 2009–2010	Succeeded by Stan Kasten
