= Jake Lemmerman =

American baseball player (born 1989)

- Shortstop
- Born: May 4, 1989 (age 37); Corona del Mar, California, U.S.
- Bats: Right Throws: Right
- Stats at Baseball Reference

Jacob Samuel Lemmerman (born May 4, 1989) is an American former professional baseball shortstop.

Lemmerman was drafted by the Los Angeles Dodgers in the 5th round of the 2010 MLB draft out of Duke University. In his debut season that year playing for the Ogden Raptors, he was named the Pioneer Baseball League Most Valuable Player, and a Post-Season All Star. In 2011, playing for the Class-A Rancho Cucamonga Quakes, he was named a Mid-Season California League All-Star.

Lemmerman was the starting shortstop for Team Israel in the World Baseball Classic qualifying tournament in September 2012. In December 2012, he was traded to the St. Louis Cardinals for Skip Schumaker. One year later, he was selected by the San Diego Padres in the minor league portion of the Rule 5 Draft.

== Early life ==
Lemmerman was a Corona del Mar High School star baseball player, and was inducted into the CdM Baseball Hall of Fame in February 2015.

== Career ==
=== Los Angeles Dodgers ===
Lemmerman was drafted by the Los Angeles Dodgers in the 5th round of the 2010 MLB draft out of Duke University. While at Duke, he had played collegiate summer baseball with the Wareham Gatemen of the Cape Cod Baseball League in 2008 and 2009.

In the Dodgers organization, he led the Pioneer Baseball League in runs (69) and doubles (24) while batting .363 (second in the league)/.434 (third in the league)/.610 (third in the league) with 12 home runs and 47 RBI in his debut season for the Ogden Raptors in 2010. Lemmerman was voted Player of the Week in the Pioneer League on July 26, 2010, and was named the league's Most Valuable Player and a Post-Season All Star. He was also named an MILB.com Dodgers organization All-Star, and a Topps Short-Season/Rookie All-Star. Baseball America ranked him the Pioneer League # 6 prospect in 2010.

Lemmerman then hit .293 with eight home runs, 54 RBI, and nine stolen bases in 103 games for the Single-A Rancho Cucamonga Quakes in 2011, and was voted a Mid-Season California League All-Star. He received a late-season promotion to the Double-A Chattanooga Lookouts.

Lemmerman played 116 games with the Lookouts in 2012, but hit only .233 with seven home runs, 48 RBI, and eight stolen bases.

=== St. Louis Cardinals ===
On December 12, 2012, Lemmerman was traded to the St. Louis Cardinals in exchange for Skip Schumaker. Derrick Goold of the St. Louis Post-Dispatch assessed him as a "heady" shortstop prospect. Lemmerman spent the 2013 campaign with the Double-A Springfield Cardinals, playing in 98 games and hitting .231/.353/.367 with eight home runs, 36 RBI, and 11 stolen bases.

=== San Diego Padres ===
On December 12, 2013, Lemmerman was selected by the San Diego Padres in the minor league portion of the Rule 5 Draft. He split the 2014 season between the Double-A San Antonio Missions and Triple-A El Paso Chihuahuas, hitting a combined .179/.280/.307 with five home runs, 24 RBI, and two stolen bases across 74 appearances. Lemmerman played in one major league spring training game for the Padres in 2015. On April 9, 2015, Lemmerman was released by the Padres organization.

== Team Israel ==
Lemmerman played as the starting shortstop for Team Israel in the World Baseball Classic qualifying tournament in September 2012. Lemmerman used documentation from his bar mitzvah and confirmation to prove his eligibility for the team. During the opening game of the tournament, while batting ninth, Lemmerman went 0 for 4, leaving 4 men on base. During the second game Lemmerman batted seventh, going 1 for 4 with a strikeout. During the third and final game, Lemmerman batted ninth and went 0 for 2 while being hit by a pitch 3 times and scoring a run.
