= Travis Schlichting =

American baseball player (born 1984)

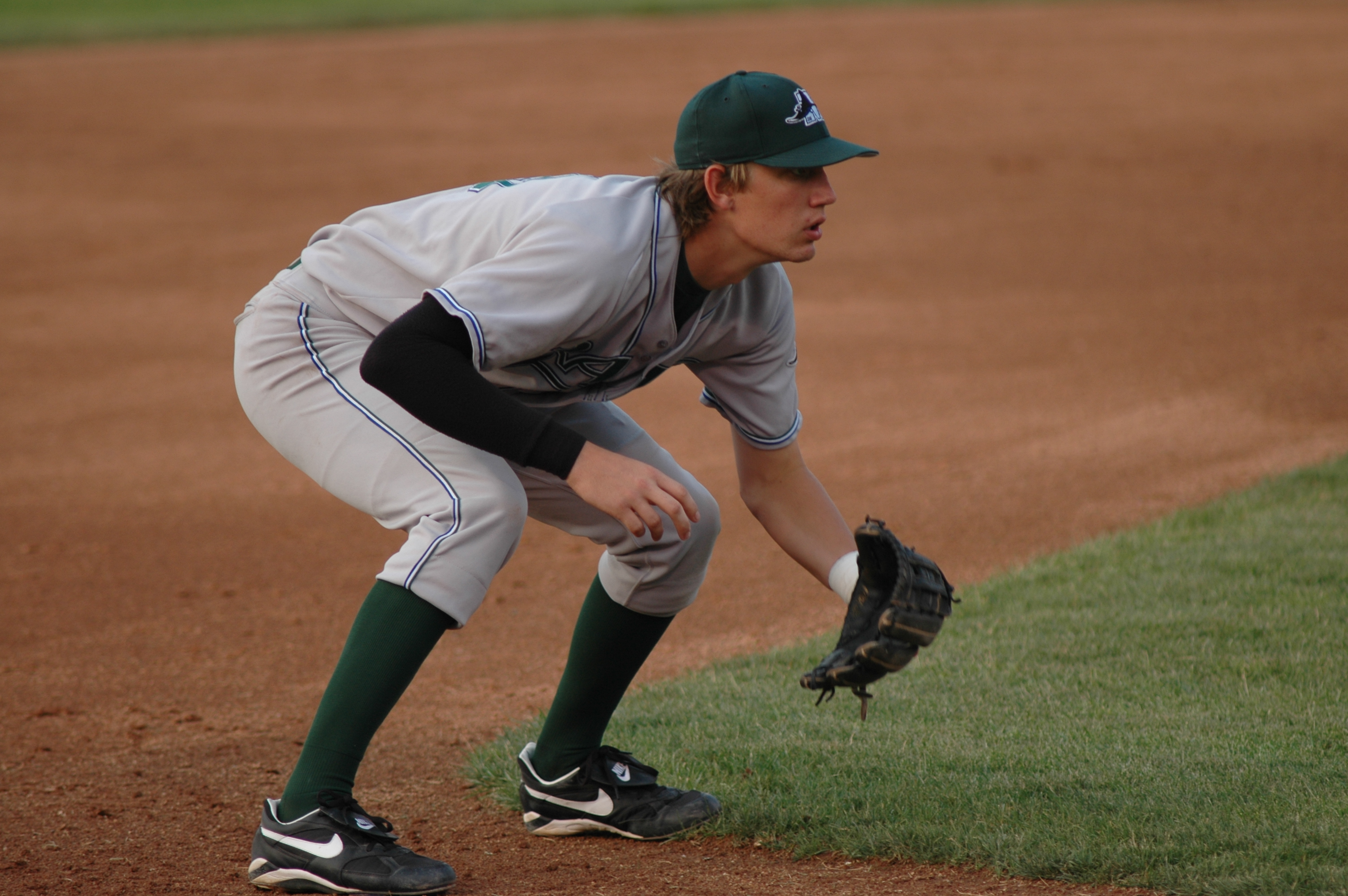
- Pitcher
- Born: October 19, 1984 (age 41); Denver, Colorado, U.S.
- Batted: Right Threw: Right

MLB debut
- June 7, 2009, for the Los Angeles Dodgers

Last MLB appearance
- August 21, 2010, for the Los Angeles Dodgers

MLB statistics
- Win–loss record: 1–0
- Earned run average: 3.55
- Strikeouts: 16
- Stats at Baseball Reference

Teams
- Los Angeles Dodgers (2009–2010)

Travis Jay Schlichting (born October 19, 1984) is an American former professional baseball pitcher, who played for the Los Angeles Dodgers in 2009 and 2010.

== Baseball career ==
=== Tampa Bay Devil Rays ===
Schlichting was drafted by the Tampa Bay Devil Rays in the 4th round of the 2003 MLB draft out of Round Rock High School in Round Rock, Texas. He made his minor league debut as a third baseman in 2003, and spent the year with the Princeton Devil Rays. In 2004, he spent the year with the Charleston RiverDogs. Schlichting played for the Southwest Michigan Devil Rays in 2005.

=== Los Angeles Angels of Anaheim ===
He was traded to the Los Angeles Angels of Anaheim in 2006 for Josh Paul and played for the Single-A Cedar Rapids Kernels.

=== Kansas City T-Bones ===
Released by the Angels after the 2006 season, he converted to a pitcher while playing independent league baseball with the Kansas City T-Bones in 2007. He was 1–2 with a 5.29 ERA in 41 appearances for the T-Bones.

=== Los Angeles Dodgers ===
That was good enough to get him an invite to the Los Angeles Dodgers camp in 2008, where he got a job pitching for the Double-A Jacksonville Suns.

Schlichting was added to the Dodgers 40 man roster prior to the 2009 season, and was assigned to the Double-A Chattanooga Lookouts.

He was promoted to the Dodgers on May 31, 2009. Schlichting made his Major League debut on June 7, 2009, against the Philadelphia Phillies. The first batter he faced was Ryan Howard, who hit a home run off of him. He worked in two games for the Dodgers, pitching 2.2 innings before he was demoted to the AAA Albuquerque Isotopes. He missed the last month of the season due to an injury.

Schlichting began 2010 with Albuquerque. He was called up to the Dodgers on May 31 and picked up his first career win by pitching four scoreless innings in the Dodgers 1-0 14 inning victory over the Arizona Diamondbacks on June 2. He appeared in 14 games for the Dodgers with a 3.57 ERA in 2010.

Schlichting was designated for assignment by the Dodgers on May 29, 2011. He remained with the Isotopes all season, appearing in 51 games with a 5–3 record and 7.10 ERA.

=== Oakland Athletics ===
On January 4, 2012, he signed a minor league contract with the Oakland Athletics. After appearing in 6 games in spring training with the team, he was assigned to Triple-A Sacramento, but he did not appear for them, as he was injured. Schlichting was released on June 18.

=== Sugar Land Skeeters ===
On August 1, 2013, Schlichting made his 2013 debut with the Sugar Land Skeeters of the Atlantic League of Professional Baseball. In 14 games, he went 1–1 with one save and a 4.15 ERA, striking out nine in 13 innings.
