= Jon Link =

American baseball player (born 1984)

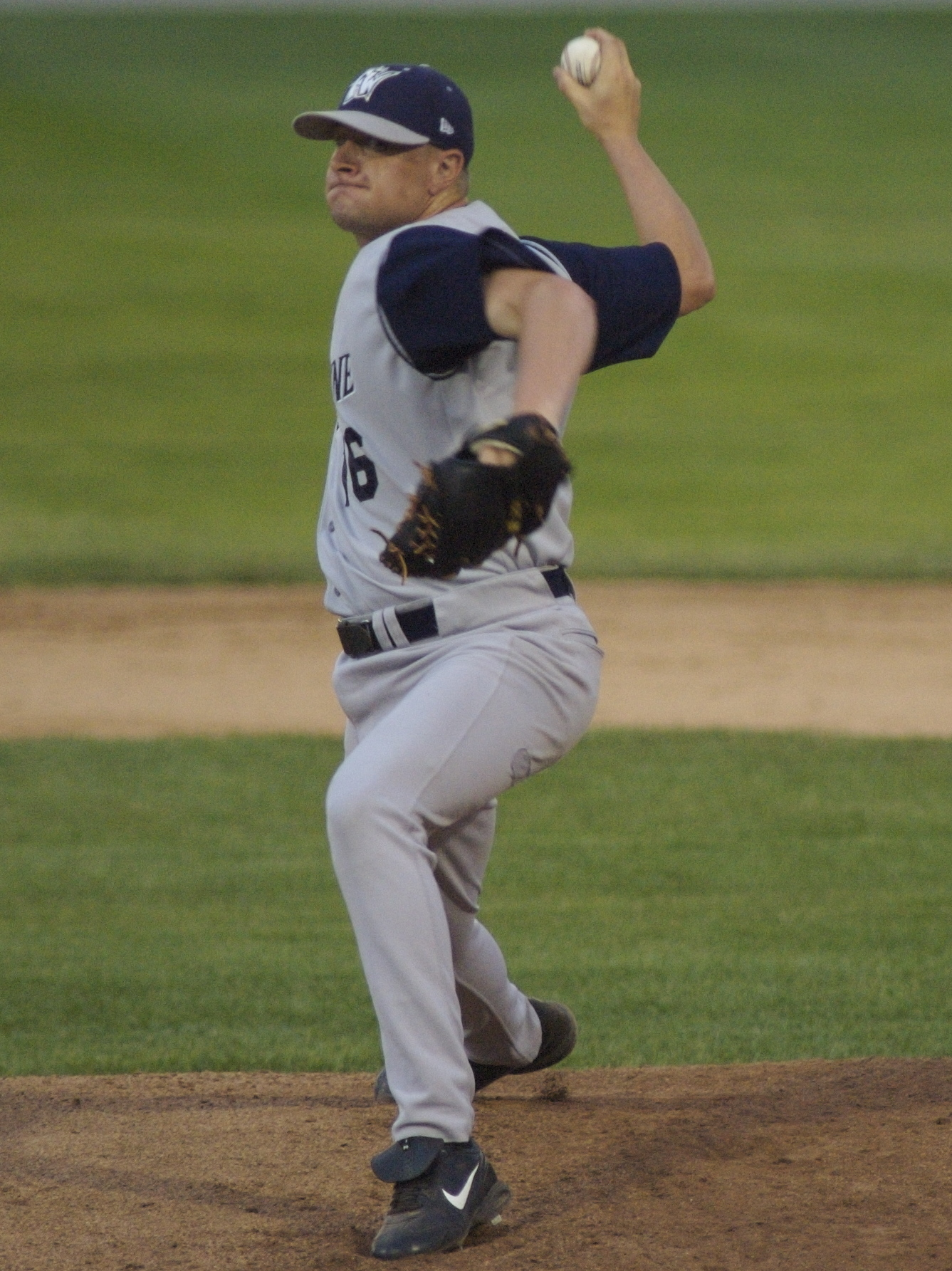
- Link with the Fort Wayne Wizards in 2006
- Pitcher
- Born: March 23, 1984 (age 42); Columbus, Ohio, U.S.
- Batted: Right Threw: Right

MLB debut
- April 20, 2010, for the Los Angeles Dodgers

Last appearance
- September 25, 2010, for the Los Angeles Dodgers

MLB statistics
- Win–loss record: 0–0
- Earned run average: 4.15
- Strikeouts: 4
- Stats at Baseball Reference

Teams
- Los Angeles Dodgers (2010)

Jon Paul Link (born March 23, 1984) is an American former professional baseball pitcher. He previously played for the Los Angeles Dodgers in 2010.

== Professional career ==
Link was drafted by the San Diego Padres in the 26th round of the 2005 MLB draft out of Bluefield College. He was the first major league player who had played at Bluefield.

=== Chicago White Sox ===
The Padres traded him to the Chicago White Sox on July 31, 2007 for Rob Mackowiak. In 2008, he was selected to the Southern League All-Star Game while playing for the Birmingham Barons, joining fellow Barons Miguel Negron, Ricardo Nanita, Justin Cassel, and Carlos Torres. He was the only Baron on the post-season All-Star team, elected as the relief pitcher. He reached AAA with the Charlotte Knights in 2009, where he saved 13 games.

=== Los Angeles Dodgers ===
On December 18, 2009, he was traded to the Los Angeles Dodgers (along with John Ely) for Juan Pierre. He began the 2010 season as the closer for the Triple-A Albuquerque Isotopes. On April 18, he was called up to the Dodgers, making his first appearance on a Major League roster. He made his Major League debut on April 20, 2010 against the Cincinnati Reds. He worked two scoreless innings of relief in his debut and was then optioned back to Albuquerque after the game. Link was also on the Dodgers' roster for a few days in June when Chad Billingsley was injured. Link was recalled for the third time on July 11, while the Dodgers optioned the man he was traded with, John Ely, to Triple-A Albuquerque in the process. He returned to AAA soon after before rejoining the Dodgers when rosters expanded in September. Overall, he appeared in 9 games with the Dodgers, working 8.2 innings for a 4.15 ERA. With Albuquerque he was 3–2 with a 3.71 ERA in 45 games, and also made one start. After the season, he pitched for the Phoenix Desert Dogs in the Arizona Fall League. After clearing waivers on April 5, 2011, Link was assigned to the Isotopes.

Link spent all of 2011 with the Isotopes, where he appeared in 54 games (including making 1 start) and was 2–2 with a 4.24 ERA and 11 saves.

=== Baltimore Orioles ===
The Baltimore Orioles signed Link to a minor league contract on December 16, 2011. He appeared in 18 games in AAA for the Norfolk Tides and was 1-2 with a 3.48 ERA before the Orioles released him.

=== Miami Marlins ===
Link subsequently signed with the Miami Marlins and made 3 appearances for the Jacksonville Suns and 11 for the New Orleans Zephyrs.

=== Detroit Tigers ===
After making 7 starts to begin 2013 with the Wichita Wingnuts in the American Association of Independent Professional Baseball, he signed a minor league contract with the Detroit Tigers, where he was assigned to Double-A Erie. After 5 starts with the SeaWolves, he was promoted to Triple-A Toledo, where he made 11 appearances (7 starts) before season's end. In 23 appearances (19 starts) in 2013, he went 9-6 with a 2.80 ERA, striking out 78 in 135 innings.

=== Miami Marlins (second stint) ===
Link returned to Wichita in 2014 and pitched with the Wingnuts until August, when his contract was purchased by the Miami Marlins. He was sent to the Double-A Jacksonville Suns.

=== Wichita Wingnuts ===
Link returned to Wichita for the 2016 season. He became a free agent after the 2016 season.
