= 2010 Washington Nationals season =

2010 Washington Nationals
- League: National League
- Division: East
- Ballpark: Nationals Park
- City: Washington, D.C.
- Record: 69–93 (.426)
- Divisional place: 5th
- Owners: Lerner Enterprises
- General managers: Mike Rizzo
- Managers: Jim Riggleman
- Television: MASN; WDCW (CW 50) (Bob Carpenter, Rob Dibble, Ray Knight)
- Radio: WWWT (Charlie Slowes, Dave Jageler)

The Washington Nationals' 2010 season was the sixth season for the American baseball franchise of Major League Baseball in the District of Columbia, and the 42nd since the original team was started in Montreal, Quebec, Canada. It involved the Nationals attempting to win the National League East after a 59–103 season the year before – the worst record of any MLB team in 2009. Jim Riggleman was kept as full-time manager after being instituted on July 12, 2009 after Manny Acta's firing.

Highlights from the season include Stephen Strasburg's 14-strikeout Major League debut on June 8 against the Pittsburgh Pirates and a bench-clearing brawl on September 1 at the Florida Marlins.

The Nationals finished 2010 in last place in the NL East for the third year in a row with a 69–93 record, though they did have a ten-game improvement from 2009. They had a 41–40 record at home, their first winning home record since 2006.

Third baseman Ryan Zimmerman won the Silver Slugger Award for the second straight year as the best offensive third baseman in the National League.

As the Texas Rangers won their first pennant that season, the Nationals became one of only two teams to have never played in the World Series, along with the Seattle Mariners

== Offseason ==
On December 7, 2009, the Nationals traded a player to be named later to the New York Yankees for Brian Bruney; they sent Jamie Hoffman to the Yankees on December 10, 2009, to complete the trade.

== Spring training ==
The Nationals held their 2010 spring training in Viera, Florida, with home games played at Space Coast Stadium.

== Regular season ==
=== Season standings ===
==== National League East ====
NL East
| Team | W | L | Pct. | GB | Home | Road |
|---|---|---|---|---|---|---|
| Philadelphia Phillies | 97 | 65 | .599 | — | 54‍–‍30 | 43‍–‍35 |
| Atlanta Braves | 91 | 71 | .562 | 6 | 56‍–‍25 | 35‍–‍46 |
| Florida Marlins | 80 | 82 | .494 | 17 | 41‍–‍40 | 39‍–‍42 |
| New York Mets | 79 | 83 | .488 | 18 | 47‍–‍34 | 32‍–‍49 |
| Washington Nationals | 69 | 93 | .426 | 28 | 41‍–‍40 | 28‍–‍53 |

==== National League Wild Card ====
Division leaders
| Team | W | L | Pct. |
|---|---|---|---|
| Philadelphia Phillies | 97 | 65 | .599 |
| San Francisco Giants | 92 | 70 | .568 |
| Cincinnati Reds | 91 | 71 | .562 |

Wild Card team (Top team qualifies for postseason)
| Team | W | L | Pct. | GB |
|---|---|---|---|---|
| Atlanta Braves | 91 | 71 | .562 | — |
| San Diego Padres | 90 | 72 | .556 | 1 |
| St. Louis Cardinals | 86 | 76 | .531 | 5 |
| Colorado Rockies | 83 | 79 | .512 | 8 |
| Florida Marlins | 80 | 82 | .494 | 11 |
| Los Angeles Dodgers | 80 | 82 | .494 | 11 |
| New York Mets | 79 | 83 | .488 | 12 |
| Milwaukee Brewers | 77 | 85 | .475 | 14 |
| Houston Astros | 76 | 86 | .469 | 15 |
| Chicago Cubs | 75 | 87 | .463 | 16 |
| Washington Nationals | 69 | 93 | .426 | 22 |
| Arizona Diamondbacks | 65 | 97 | .401 | 26 |
| Pittsburgh Pirates | 57 | 105 | .352 | 34 |

==== Record vs. opponents ====
2010 National League record Source: MLB Standings Grid – 2010
| Team | AZ | ATL | CHC | CIN | COL | FLA | HOU | LAD | MIL | NYM | PHI | PIT | SD | SF | STL | WSH | AL |
|---|---|---|---|---|---|---|---|---|---|---|---|---|---|---|---|---|---|
| Arizona | – | 3–4 | 1–6 | 2–5 | 9–9 | 3–3 | 4–3 | 5–13 | 3–4 | 5–1 | 2–4 | 2–4 | 8–10 | 5–13 | 4–5 | 3–4 | 6–9 |
| Atlanta | 4–3 | – | 4–2 | 3–2 | 2–4 | 11–7 | 5–1 | 5–3 | 5–2 | 11–7 | 8–10 | 6–3 | 4–2 | 4–3 | 2–6 | 8–10 | 9–6 |
| Chicago | 6–1 | 2–4 | – | 4–12 | 2–3 | 4–2 | 7–11 | 3–4 | 9–6 | 3–4 | 4–2 | 5–10 | 3–5 | 2–5 | 9–6 | 4–2 | 8–10 |
| Cincinnati | 5–2 | 2–3 | 12–4 | – | 2–5 | 5–2 | 10–5 | 5–4 | 11–3 | 4–2 | 2–5 | 10–6 | 2–4 | 3–4 | 6–12 | 4–3 | 8–7 |
| Colorado | 9–9 | 4–2 | 3–2 | 5–2 | – | 3–4 | 2–4 | 7–11 | 5–4 | 3–3 | 1–6 | 3–4 | 12–6 | 9–9 | 3–4 | 5–3 | 9–6 |
| Florida | 3–3 | 7–11 | 2–4 | 2–5 | 4–3 | – | 3–3 | 4–2 | 4–4 | 12–6 | 5–13 | 6–2 | 3–6 | 2–5 | 3–2 | 13–5 | 7–8 |
| Houston | 3–4 | 1–5 | 11–7 | 5–10 | 4–2 | 3–3 | – | 2–4 | 8–7 | 3–4 | 4–3 | 11–4 | 2–5 | 2–7 | 10–5 | 4–4 | 3–12 |
| Los Angeles | 13–5 | 3–5 | 4–3 | 4–5 | 11–7 | 2–4 | 4–2 | – | 4–2 | 3–4 | 2–4 | 4–3 | 8–10 | 8–10 | 3–4 | 3–3 | 4–11 |
| Milwaukee | 4–3 | 2–5 | 6–9 | 3–11 | 4–5 | 4–4 | 7–8 | 2–4 | – | 5–2 | 1–5 | 13–5 | 3–4 | 2–5 | 8–7 | 4–2 | 9–6 |
| New York | 1–5 | 7–11 | 4–3 | 2–4 | 3–3 | 6–12 | 4–3 | 4–3 | 2–5 | – | 9–9 | 6–1 | 3–3 | 3–4 | 3–3 | 9–9 | 13–5 |
| Philadelphia | 4–2 | 10–8 | 2–4 | 5–2 | 6–1 | 13–5 | 3–4 | 4–2 | 5–1 | 9–9 | – | 2–4 | 5–2 | 3–3 | 4–4 | 12–6 | 10–8 |
| Pittsburgh | 4–2 | 3–6 | 10–5 | 6–10 | 4–3 | 2–6 | 4–11 | 3–4 | 5–13 | 1–6 | 4–2 | – | 0–6 | 2–4 | 6–9 | 1–5 | 2–13 |
| San Diego | 10–8 | 2–4 | 5–3 | 4–2 | 6–12 | 6–3 | 5–2 | 10–8 | 4–3 | 3–3 | 2–5 | 6–0 | – | 12–6 | 3–4 | 3–3 | 9–6 |
| San Francisco | 13–5 | 3–4 | 5–2 | 4–3 | 9–9 | 5–2 | 7–2 | 10–8 | 5–2 | 4–3 | 3–3 | 4–2 | 6–12 | – | 3–3 | 4–2 | 7–8 |
| St. Louis | 5–4 | 6–2 | 6–9 | 12–6 | 4–3 | 2–3 | 5–10 | 4–3 | 7–8 | 3–3 | 4–4 | 9–6 | 4–3 | 3–3 | – | 3–3 | 9–6 |
| Washington | 4–3 | 10–8 | 2–4 | 3–4 | 3–5 | 5–13 | 4–4 | 3–3 | 2–4 | 9–9 | 6–12 | 5–1 | 3–3 | 2–4 | 3–3 | – | 5–13 |

=== Opening Day lineup ===
Opening Day Starters
| Name | Position |
|---|---|
| Nyjer Morgan | Center fielder |
| Willie Harris | Right fielder |
| Ryan Zimmerman | Third baseman |
| Adam Dunn | First baseman |
| Josh Willingham | Left fielder |
| Adam Kennedy | Second baseman |
| Iván Rodríguez | Catcher |
| Ian Desmond | Shortstop |
| John Lannan | Starting pitcher |

=== Notable transactions ===
- May 24, 2010: The Nationals sent Andrew Brown to the St. Louis Cardinals as part of a conditional deal.
- July 29, 2010: The Nationals traded Matt Capps to the Minnesota Twins for Wilson Ramos and minor-leaguer Joe Testa.
- July 30, 2010: The Nationals traded Cristian Guzmán to the Texas Rangers for Tanner Roark and minor-leaguer Ryan Tatusko.
- August 7, 2010: The Nationals purchased Brian Bixler from the Pittsburgh Pirates.

=== Draft ===
The 2010 Major League Baseball draft took place from June 7 to June 9. With their first pick – the first pick overall – the Nationals selected outfielder Bryce Harper. Other notable players the Nationals selected were pitcher Sammy Solis (second round, 51st overall), pitcher A. J. Cole (fourth round, 116th overall), pitcher Matt Grace (eighth round, 236th overall), pitcher Aaron Barrett (ninth round, 266th overall), and pitcher Robbie Ray (12th round, 356th overall).

=== Roster ===
2010 Washington Nationals
**Roster**
| **Pitchers**: 56 Luis Atilano; 99 Collin Balester; 43 Miguel Batista; 57 Jason Bergmann; 46 Joe Bisenius; 32 Brian Bruney; 17 Sean Burnett; 55 Matt Capps; 47 Matt Chico; 36 Tyler Clippard; 48 Ross Detwiler; 50 Jesse English; 61 Liván Hernández; 31 John Lannan; 21 Jason Marquis; 51 J. D. Martin; 29 Yunesky Maya; 49 Garrett Mock; 19 Scott Olsen; 62,52 Joel Peralta; 45 Doug Slaten; 35 Craig Stammen; 58 Drew Storen; 37 Stephen Strasburg; 25,39 Tyler Walker; 27 Jordan Zimmermann | **Catchers**: 32 Jamie Burke; 25 Carlos Maldonado; 23 Wil Nieves; 3 Wilson Ramos; 7 Iván Rodríguez; **Infielders**: 6 Ian Desmond; 44 Adam Dunn; 18 Danny Espinosa; 12 Alberto González; 15 Cristian Guzmán; 20 Adam Kennedy; 11 Ryan Zimmerman; **Outfielders**: 2 Roger Bernadina; 22 Willie Harris; 30 Justin Maxwell; 32 Kevin Mench; 1 Nyjer Morgan; 28 Mike Morse; 3 Willy Taveras; 16 Josh Willingham | **Manager**: 5 Jim Riggleman; **Coaches**: 14 Rick Eckstein (hitting); 9 Jim Lett (bullpen); 37 Pat Listach (third base); 54 Steve McCatty (pitching); 8 John McLaren (bench); 53 Dan Radison (first base) |

=== Attendance ===
The Nationals drew 1,828,066 fans at Nationals Park in 2010, a slight improvement over their 2009 attendance. However, it placed them 14th in attendance for the season among the 16 National League teams, down from 13th the previous year. Their highest attendance at a home game was on April 5, when they drew 41,290 for a game against the Philadelphia Phillies on Opening Day, while their lowest was 10,999 for a game against the Houston Astros on September 20. Their average home attendance was 22,569 per game, their lowest since arriving in Washington in 2005.

=== Game log ===
Legend
| | Nationals win |
| | Nationals loss |
| | Postponement |
| **Bold** | Nationals team member |

2010 game log
April (13–10)

| # | Date | Opponent | Score | Win | Loss | Save | Attendance | Record |
|---|---|---|---|---|---|---|---|---|
| 1 | April 5 | Phillies | 11 – 1 | Halladay (1-0) | **Lannan** (0-1) | | 41,290 | 0-1 |
| 2 | April 7 | Phillies | 8 – 4 | Hamels (1-0) | **Marquis** (0-1) | Madson (1) | 27,240 | 0-2 |
| 3 | April 8 | Phillies | 6 – 5 | **Clippard** (1-0) | Figueroa (0-1) | **Capps** (1) | 20,217 | 1-2 |
| 4 | April 9 | @ Mets | 8 – 2 | Pelfrey (1-0) | **Batista** (0-1) | | 28,055 | 1-3 |
| 5 | April 10 | @ Mets | 4 – 3 | **Lannan** (1-1) | Pérez (0-1) | **Capps** (2) | 33,044 | 2-3 |
| 6 | April 11 | @ Mets | 5 – 2 | **Hernández** (1-0) | Santana (1-1) | **Capps** (3) | 33,672 | 3-3 |
| 7 | April 12 | @ Phillies | 7 – 4 | Hamels (2-0) | **Marquis** (0-2) | Madson (2) | 44,791 | 3-4 |
| 8 | April 14 | @ Phillies | 14 – 7 | Figueroa (1-1) | **Bergmann** (0-1) | | 45,438 | 3-5 |
| 9 | April 15 | @ Phillies | 7 – 5 | **Clippard** (2-0) | Báez (0-1) | **Capps** (4) | 44,157 | 4-5 |
| 10 | April 16 | Brewers | 5 – 3 | **Bruney** (1-0) | Hawkins (0-2) | **Capps** (5) | 17,234 | 5-5 |
| 11 | April 17 | Brewers | 8 – 0 | **Hernández** (2-0) | Wolf (1-1) | | 18,673 | 6-5 |
| 12 | April 18 | Brewers | 11 – 7 | Vargas (1-0) | **Marquis** (0-3) | | 18,789 | 6-6 |
| 13 | April 19 | Rockies | 5 – 2 | **Stammen** (1-0) | Cook (0-2) | **Capps** (6) | 11,623 | 7-6 |
| 14 | April 20 | Rockies | 10 – 4 | de la Rosa (2-1) | **Olsen** (0-1) | | 15,037 | 7-7 |
| 15 | April 21 | Rockies | 6 – 4 | **Clippard** (3-0) | Betancourt (0-1) | **Capps** (7) | 11,191 | 8-7 |
| 16 | April 22 | Rockies | 2 – 0 | Jiménez (4-0) | **Hernández** (2-1) | Morales (3) | 15,518 | 8-8 |
| 17 | April 23 | Dodgers | 5 – 1 | **Atilano** (1-0) | Haeger (0-2) | | 23,859 | 9-8 |
| 18 | April 24 | Dodgers | 4 – 3 (13) | Monasterios (1-0) | **Batista** (0-2) | | 18,039 | 9-9 |
| 19 | April 25 | Dodgers | 1 – 0 | **Olsen** (1-1) | Billingsley (1-1) | **Capps** (8) | 18,395 | 10-9 |
| 20 | April 26 | @ Cubs | 4 – 3 (10) | Mármol (1-0) | **Bruney** (1-1) | | 37,850 | 10-10 |
| 21 | April 27 | @ Cubs | 3 – 1 | **Hernández** (3-1) | Gorzelanny (0-3) | **Capps** (9) | 37,440 | 11-10 |
| 22 | April 28 | @ Cubs | 3 – 2 | **Atilano** (2-0) | Dempster (2-1) | **Capps** (10) | 36,660 | 12-10 |
| 23 | April 30 | @ Marlins | 7 – 1 | **Olsen** (2-1) | Nolasco (2-1) | | 20,856 | 13-10 |

May (13–16)

| # | Date | Opponent | Score | Win | Loss | Save | Attendance | Record |
|---|---|---|---|---|---|---|---|---|
| 24 | May 1 | @ Marlins | 7 – 1 | Volstad (2-2) | **Stammen** (1-1) | | 34,886 | 13-11 |
| 25 | May 2 | @ Marlins | 9 – 3 | Johnson (3-1) | **Lannan** (1-2) | | 13,169 | 13-12 |
| 26 | May 4 | Braves | 6 – 3 | **Hernández** (4-1) | Kawakami (0-5) | **Capps** (11) | 17,098 | 14-12 |
| 27 | May 5 | Braves | 7 – 6 (10) | Medlen (1-1) | **Capps** (0-1) | Wagner (3) | 15,616 | 14-13 |
| 28 | May 6 | Braves | 3 – 2 | **Clippard** (4-0) | O'Flaherty (1-1) | | 17,131 | 15-13 |
| 29 | May 7 | Marlins | 4 – 2 | Volstad (3-2) | **Bruney** (1-2) | Oviedo (5) | 20,161 | 15-14 |
| 30 | May 8 | Marlins | 5 – 4 | **Clippard** (5-0) | Badenhop (0-4) | **Capps** (12) | 21,633 | 16-14 |
| 31 | May 9 | Marlins | 3 – 2 | **Clippard** (6-0) | Hensley (1-1) | **Capps** (13) | 21,299 | 17-14 |
| 32 | May 10 | @ Mets | 3 – 2 | **Atilano** (3-0) | Maine (1-2) | **Batista** (1) | 29,313 | 18-14 |
| 33 | May 11 | @ Mets | 8 – 6 | Valdés (1-0) | **Clippard** (6-1) | Rodríguez (5) | 31,606 | 18-15 |
| 34 | May 12 | @ Mets | 6 – 4 | **Clippard** (7-1) | Rodríguez (2-1) | **Capps** (14) | 33,024 | 19-15 |
| 35 | May 13 | @ Rockies | 14 – 6 (8) | **Slaten** (1-0) | Chacín (2-1) | | 20,795 | 20-15 |
| – | May 14 | @ Rockies | Postponed (rain) Rescheduled for May 15 as part of a doubleheader | | | | | |
| 36 | May 15 (1) | @ Rockies | 6 – 2 | Jiménez (7-1) | **Hernández** (4-2) | | 29,111 | 20-16 |
| 37 | May 15 (2) | @ Rockies | 4 – 3 | Hammel (1-2) | **Burnett** (0-1) | Corpas (1) | 35,258 | 20-17 |
| 38 | May 16 | @ Rockies | 2 – 1 | Bélisle (1-0) | **Clippard** (7-2) | Corpas (2) | 42,874 | 20-18 |
| 39 | May 17 | @ Cardinals | 6 – 2 | Lohse (1-3) | **Stammen** (1-2) | | 38,005 | 20-19 |
| 40 | May 18 | @ Cardinals | 3 – 2 | Carpenter (5-1) | **Clippard** (7-3) | Franklin (9) | 36,345 | 20-20 |
| 41 | May 19 | Mets | 5 – 3 | **Storen** (1-0) | Valdés (1-1) | **Capps** (15) | 19,384 | 21-20 |
| 42 | May 20 | Mets | 10 – 7 | Valdés (2-1) | **Atilano** (3-1) | | 23,612 | 21-21 |
| 43 | May 21 | Orioles | 5 – 3 | Hernández (1-5) | **Olsen** (2-2) | Simón (6) | 27,378 | 21-22 |
| 44 | May 22 | Orioles | 7 – 6 | **Walker** (1-0) | Hendrickson (1-2) | **Capps** (16) | 30,290 | 22-22 |
| 45 | May 23 | Orioles | 4 – 3 (10) | **Slaten** (2-0) | Meredith (0-2) | | 27,535 | 23-22 |
| 46 | May 25 | @ Giants | 4 – 2 | Wellemeyer (3-4) | **Hernández** (4-3) | Wilson (11) | 27,981 | 23-23 |
| 47 | May 26 | @ Giants | 7 – 3 | **Atilano** (4-1) | Lincecum (5-1) | | 30,230 | 24-23 |
| 48 | May 27 | @ Giants | 5 – 4 | Casilla (1-0) | **Burnett** (0-2) | Wilson (12) | 28,251 | 24-24 |
| 49 | May 28 | @ Padres | 5 – 3 | **Lannan** (2-2) | Richard (4-3) | **Capps** (17) | 23,468 | 25-24 |
| 50 | May 29 | @ Padres | 4 – 2 | Latos (5-3) | **Martin** (0-1) | Bell (14) | 25,956 | 25-25 |
| 51 | May 30 | @ Padres | 3 – 2 (11) | Gregerson (1-1) | **Burnett** (0-3) | | 28,591 | 25-26 |
| 52 | May 31 | @ Astros | 14 – 4 | **Atilano** (5-1) | Oswalt (3-7) | | 34,704 | 26-26 |

June (8–19)

| # | Date | Opponent | Score | Win | Loss | Save | Attendance | Record |
|---|---|---|---|---|---|---|---|---|
| 53 | June 1 | @ Astros | 8 – 7 | López (2-0) | **Capps** (0-2) | | 25,249 | 26-27 |
| 54 | June 2 | @ Astros | 5 – 1 | Rodríguez (3-7) | **Lannan** (2-3) | | 26,736 | 26-28 |
| 55 | June 3 | @ Astros | 6 – 4 | Lindstrom (2-1) | **Capps** (0-3) | | 21,814 | 26-29 |
| 56 | June 4 | Reds | 4 – 2 | **Clippard** (8-3) | del Rosario (1-1) | **Capps** (18) | 33,774 | 27-29 |
| 57 | June 5 | Reds | 5 – 1 | Leake (5-0) | **Atilano** (5-2) | | 22,896 | 27-30 |
| 58 | June 6 | Reds | 5 – 4 (10) | Cordero (2-3) | **Slaten** (2-1) | Masset (1) | 27,202 | 27-31 |
| 59 | June 8 | Pirates | 5 – 2 | **Strasburg** (1-0) | Karstens (1-2) | **Capps** (19) | 40,315 | 28-31 |
| 60 | June 9 | Pirates | 7 – 5 | **Storen** (2-0) | Carrasco (1-2) | **Capps** (20) | 18,876 | 29-31 |
| 61 | June 10 | Pirates | 4 – 2 | **Hernández** (5-3) | Duke (3-7) | **Clippard** (1) | 21,767 | 30-31 |
| 62 | June 11 | @ Indians | 7 – 2 | Westbrook (4-3) | **Atilano** (5-3) | Pérez (6) | 22,041 | 30-32 |
| 63 | June 12 | @ Indians | 7 – 1 | Hernández (5-5) | **Martin** (0-2) | | 19,484 | 30-33 |
| 64 | June 13 | @ Indians | 9 – 4 | **Strasburg** (2-0) | Huff (2-8) | | 32,876 | 31-33 |
| 65 | June 15 | @ Tigers | 7 – 4 | Scherzer (3-6) | **Lannan** (2-4) | Valverde (14) | 24,821 | 31-34 |
| 66 | June 16 | @ Tigers | 8 – 3 | Verlander (8-4) | **Hernández** (5-4) | | 24,767 | 31-35 |
| 67 | June 17 | @ Tigers | 8 – 3 | Bonderman (3-4) | **Atilano** (5-4) | | 33,630 | 31-36 |
| 68 | June 18 | White Sox | 2 – 1 (11) | Putz (2-2) | **Storen** (2-1) | Jenks (14) | 40,325 | 31-37 |
| 69 | June 19 | White Sox | 1 – 0 | Peavy (6-5) | **Martin** (0-3) | | 36,487 | 31-38 |
| 70 | June 20 | White Sox | 6 – 3 | García (8-3) | **Lannan** (2-5) | Putz (1) | 31,763 | 31-39 |
| 71 | June 21 | Royals | 2 – 1 | **Hernández** (6-4) | Chen (3-2) | **Capps** (21) | 13,592 | 32-39 |
| 72 | June 22 | Royals | 4 – 3 | **Atilano** (6-4) | Lerew (0-1) | **Capps** (22) | 21,168 | 33-39 |
| 73 | June 23 | Royals | 1 – 0 | Bannister (7-5) | **Strasburg** (2-1) | Soria (17) | 31,913 | 33-40 |
| 74 | June 25 | @ Orioles | 7 – 6 | Simón (2-1) | **Clippard** (8-4) | | 43,484 | 33-41 |
| 75 | June 26 | @ Orioles | 6 – 5 | Berken (1-1) | **Burnett** (0-4) | Simón (8) | 28,635 | 33-42 |
| 76 | June 27 | @ Orioles | 4 – 3 | Hernández (3-6) | **Clippard** (8-5) | Simón (9) | 22,951 | 33-43 |
| 77 | June 28 | @ Braves | 5 – 0 | Hudson (8-3) | **Strasburg** (2-2) | | 42,889 | 33-44 |
| 78 | June 29 | @ Braves | 7 – 2 | **Stammen** (2-2) | Lowe (9-6) | | 19,045 | 34-44 |
| 79 | June 30 | @ Braves | 4 – 1 | Jurrjens (1-3) | **Martin** (0-4) | Wagner (16) | 20,091 | 34-45 |

July (12–13)

| # | Date | Opponent | Score | Win | Loss | Save | Attendance | Record |
|---|---|---|---|---|---|---|---|---|
| 80 | July 1 | Mets | 2 – 1 | **Capps** (1-3) | Feliciano (2-4) | | 20,167 | 35-45 |
| 81 | July 2 | Mets | 5 – 3 | Niese (6-2) | **Atilano** (6-5) | Rodríguez (19) | 24,410 | 35-46 |
| 82 | July 3 | Mets | 6 – 5 | **Capps** (2-3) | Rodríguez (2-2) | | 39,214 | 36-46 |
| 83 | July 4 | Mets | 9 – 5 | Takahashi (7-3) | **Stammen** (2-3) | Rodríguez (20) | 29,234 | 36-47 |
| 84 | July 6 | Padres | 6 – 5 | **Capps** (3-3) | Gregerson (2-4) | | 14,039 | 37-47 |
| 85 | July 7 | Padres | 7 – 6 | **Martin** (1-4) | Garland (8-6) | **Capps** (23) | 13,762 | 38-47 |
| 86 | July 8 | Padres | 7 – 1 | Latos (10-4) | **Atilano** (6-6) | | 17,364 | 38-48 |
| 87 | July 9 | Giants | 8 – 1 | **Strasburg** (3-2) | Cain (6-8) | | 34,723 | 39-48 |
| 88 | July 10 | Giants | 10 – 5 | Casilla (2-2) | **Clippard** (8-6) | | 23,977 | 39-49 |
| 89 | July 11 | Giants | 6 – 2 | Bumgarner (2-2) | **Hernández** (6-5) | Wilson (23) | 22,403 | 39-50 |
**All–Star Break (July 12–14)**
| 90 | July 16 | @ Marlins | 4 – 0 | **Strasburg** (4-2) | Nolasco (9-7) | | 27,037 | 40-50 |
| 91 | July 17 | @ Marlins | 2 – 0 | Johnson (10-3) | **Hernández** (6-6) | Oviedo (21) | 23,005 | 40-51 |
| 92 | July 18 | @ Marlins | 1 – 0 | Sanabia (1-1) | **Stammen** (2-4) | Oviedo (22) | 21,057 | 40-52 |
| 93 | July 19 | @ Reds | 7 – 2 | Cueto (9-2) | **Martin** (1-5) | | 21,243 | 40-53 |
| 94 | July 20 | @ Reds | 8 – 7 | Leake (7-1) | **Atilano** (6-7) | Cordero (26) | 22,876 | 40-54 |
| 95 | July 21 | @ Reds | 8 – 5 | **Strasburg** (5-2) | Arroyo (10-5) | **Capps** (24) | 37,868 | 41-54 |
| 96 | July 22 | @ Reds | 7 – 1 | **Hernández** (7-6) | Vólquez (1-1) | | 23,115 | 42-54 |
| 97 | July 23 | @ Brewers | 7 – 5 | Loe (1-1) | **Burnett** (0-5) | Axford (14) | 34,822 | 42-55 |
| 98 | July 24 | @ Brewers | 4 – 3 | Axford (6-1) | **Storen** (2-2) | | 41,987 | 42-56 |
| 99 | July 25 | @ Brewers | 8 – 3 | Bush (5-8) | **Detwiler** (0-1) | | 42,414 | 42-57 |
| 100 | July 27 | Braves | 3 – 0 | **Batista** (1-2) | Hanson (8-7) | **Capps** (25) | 40,043 | 43-57 |
| 101 | July 28 | Braves | 3 – 1 | Hudson (11-5) | **Hernández** (7-7) | Wagner (23) | 24,263 | 43-58 |
| 102 | July 29 | Braves | 5 – 3 | **Olsen** (3-2) | Lowe (10-9) | **Capps** (26) | 30,263 | 44-58 |
| 103 | July 30 | Phillies | 8 – 1 | **Stammen** (3-4) | Oswalt (6-13) | | 32,590 | 45-58 |
| 104 | July 31 | Phillies | 7 – 5 | **Storen** (3-2) | Lidge (1-1) | | 38,049 | 46-58 |

August (11–18)

| # | Date | Opponent | Score | Win | Loss | Save | Attendance | Record |
|---|---|---|---|---|---|---|---|---|
| 105 | August 1 | Phillies | 6 – 4 (11) | Contreras (6-3) | **Balester** (0-1) | Lidge (11) | 35,807 | 46-59 |
| 106 | August 2 | @ Diamondbacks | 3 – 1 | **Hernández** (8-7) | López (5-10) | **Burnett** (1) | 16,793 | 47-59 |
| 107 | August 3 | @ Diamondbacks | 6 – 1 | Saunders (7-10) | **Olsen** (3-3) | | 17,164 | 47-60 |
| 108 | August 4 | @ Diamondbacks | 7 – 2 | **Stammen** (4-4) | Kennedy (6-9) | | 15,670 | 48-60 |
| 109 | August 5 | @ Diamondbacks | 8 – 4 | Enright (3-2) | **Detwiler** (0-2) | | 16,638 | 48-61 |
| 110 | August 6 | @ Dodgers | 6 – 3 | **Lannan** (3-5) | Kershaw (10-7) | **Storen** (1) | 39,153 | 49-61 |
| 111 | August 7 | @ Dodgers | 3 – 2 (10) | Broxton (4-3) | **Burnett** (0-6) | | 44,896 | 49-62 |
| 112 | August 8 | @ Dodgers | 8 – 3 | Lilly (5-8) | **Marquis** (0-4) | | 43,639 | 49-63 |
| 113 | August 10 | Marlins | 8 – 2 | Sánchez (9-7) | **Strasburg** (5-3) | | 25,939 | 49-64 |
| 114 | August 11 | Marlins | 9 – 5 | Volstad (6-8) | **Olsen** (3-4) | | 15,061 | 49-65 |
| 115 | August 12 | Marlins | 5 – 0 | Nolasco (13-8) | **Hernández** (8-8) | | 16,496 | 49-66 |
| 116 | August 13 | Diamondbacks | 4 – 2 | **Lannan** (4-5) | Saunders (7-12) | **Burnett** (2) | 19,549 | 50-66 |
| 117 | August 14 | Diamondbacks | 9 – 2 | Kennedy (7-9) | **Marquis** (0-5) | | 22,400 | 50-67 |
| 118 | August 15 | Diamondbacks | 5 – 3 | **Clippard** (9-6) | Norberto (0-2) | **Storen** (2) | 21,695 | 51-67 |
| 119 | August 17 | @ Braves | 10 – 2 | Minor (1-0) | **Olsen** (3-5) | | 16,911 | 51-68 |
| 120 | August 18 | @ Braves | 3 – 2 | Wagner (7-2) | **Burnett** (0-7) | | 18,105 | 51-69 |
| 121 | August 19 | @ Braves | 6 – 2 | **Lannan** (5-5) | Lowe (11-11) | | 15,593 | 52-69 |
| 122 | August 20 | @ Phillies | 1 – 0 | Halladay (16-8) | **Marquis** (0-6) | Lidge (17) | 45,093 | 52-70 |
| 123 | August 21 | @ Phillies | 8 – 1 | **Slaten** (3-1) | Kendrick (8-6) | | 45,266 | 53-70 |
| 124 | August 22 | @ Phillies | 6 – 0 | Oswalt (9-13) | **Olsen** (3-6) | | 44,539 | 53-71 |
| 125 | August 23 | Cubs | 9 – 1 | Coleman (1-1) | **Hernández** (8-9) | | 17,921 | 53-72 |
| 126 | August 24 | Cubs | 5 – 4 | Zambrano (5-6) | **Lannan** (5-6) | Mármol (23) | 18,250 | 53-73 |
| 127 | August 25 | Cubs | 4 – 0 | Dempster (12-8) | **Marquis** (0-7) | | 18,344 | 53-74 |
| 128 | August 26 | Cardinals | 11 – 10 (13) | **Slaten** (4-1) | Hawksworth (4-8) | | 22,317 | 54-74 |
| 129 | August 27 | Cardinals | 4 – 2 | García (12-6) | **Olsen** (3-7) | Franklin (22) | 22,871 | 54-75 |
| 130 | August 28 | Cardinals | 14 – 5 | **Hernández** (9-9) | Lohse (2-6) | | 30,688 | 55-75 |
| 131 | August 29 | Cardinals | 4 – 2 | **Lannan** (6-6) | Wainwright (17-9) | **Storen** (3) | 24,782 | 56-75 |
| 132 | August 30 | @ Marlins | 9 – 3 | **Marquis** (1-7) | Sanabia (3-2) | | 18,326 | 57-75 |
| 133 | August 31 | @ Marlins | 1 – 0 (10) | Hensley (3-4) | **Storen** (3-3) | | 18,506 | 57-76 |

September (11–15)

| # | Date | Opponent | Score | Win | Loss | Save | Attendance | Record |
|---|---|---|---|---|---|---|---|---|
| 134 | September 1 | @ Marlins | 16 – 10 | Volstad (9-9) | **Olsen** (3-8) | | 18,045 | 57-77 |
| 135 | September 3 | @ Pirates | 8 – 5 | Duke (7-12) | **Hernández** (9-10) | Hanrahan (3) | 19,734 | 57-78 |
| 136 | September 4 | @ Pirates | 9 – 2 | **Lannan** (7-6) | Maholm (7-14) | | 30,263 | 58-78 |
| 137 | September 5 | @ Pirates | 8 – 1 | **Marquis** (2-7) | Morton (1-11) | | 18,057 | 59-78 |
| 138 | September 6 | Mets | 13 – 3 | **Olsen** (4-8) | Pelfrey (13-9) | | 20,224 | 60-78 |
| 139 | September 7 | Mets | 4 – 1 | Gee (1-0) | **Maya** (0-1) | Takahashi (4) | 13,835 | 60-79 |
| 140 | September 8 | Mets | 3 – 2 | Dickey (10-6) | **Hernández** (9-11) | Takahashi (5) | 16,002 | 60-80 |
| 141 | September 10 | Marlins | 3 – 1 | Sanabia (4-2) | **Lannan** (7-7) | Hensley (1) | 17,180 | 60-81 |
| 142 | September 11 | Marlins | 4 – 1 | Sánchez (12-9) | **Marquis** (2-8) | Hensley (2) | 17,941 | 60-82 |
| 143 | September 12 | Marlins | 6 – 5 | Sanches (1-2) | **Zimmermann** (0-1) | Hensley (3) | 16,788 | 60-83 |
| 144 | September 13 | @ Braves | 4 – 0 | Lowe (13-12) | **Maya** (0-2) | | 18,647 | 60-84 |
| 145 | September 14 | @ Braves | 6 – 0 | **Hernández** (10-11) | Jurrjens (7-6) | | 26,954 | 61-84 |
| 146 | September 15 | @ Braves | 4 – 2 | **Lannan** (8-7) | Minor (3-1) | **Storen** (4) | 19,237 | 62-84 |
| 147 | September 17 | @ Phillies | 9 – 1 | Oswalt (13-13) | **Marquis** (2-9) | | 45,338 | 62-85 |
| 148 | September 18 | @ Phillies | 5 – 2 | Kendrick (10-9) | **Zimmermann** (0-2) | Lidge (23) | 45,222 | 62-86 |
| 149 | September 19 | @ Phillies | 7 – 6 | Worley (1-1) | **Storen** (3-4) | | 44,936 | 62-87 |
| 150 | September 20 | Astros | 8 – 2 | Norris (9-8) | **Hernández** (10-12) | | 10,999 | 62-88 |
| 151 | September 21 | Astros | 8 – 4 | **Clippard** (10-6) | Paulino (1-9) | | 11,893 | 63-88 |
| 152 | September 22 | Astros | 4 – 3 | **Clippard** (11-6) | Fulchino (2-1) | **Burnett** (3) | 12,213 | 64-88 |
| 153 | September 23 | Astros | 7 – 2 | **Detwiler** (1-2) | Figueroa (5-4) | | 14,633 | 65-88 |
| 154 | September 24 | Braves | 8 – 3 | **Zimmermann** (1-2) | Hudson (16-9) | | 22,515 | 66-88 |
| 155 | September 25 | Braves | 5 – 0 | Lowe (15-12) | **Maya** (0-3) | | 23,824 | 66-89 |
| 156 | September 26 | Braves | 4 – 2 | **Burnett** (1-7) | Farnsworth (3-2) | **Storen** (5) | 21,625 | 67-89 |
| 157 | September 27 | Phillies | 8 – 0 | Halladay (21-10) | **Lannan** (8-8) | | 14,309 | 67-90 |
| 158 | September 28 | Phillies | 2 – 1 | **Storen** (4-4) | Contreras (6-4) | | 19,117 | 68-90 |
| 159 | September 29 | Phillies | 7 – 1 | Blanton (9-6) | **Detwiler** (1-3) | | 20,026 | 68-91 |

October (1–2)

| # | Date | Opponent | Score | Win | Loss | Save | Attendance | Record |
|---|---|---|---|---|---|---|---|---|
| 160 | October 1 | @ Mets | 2 – 1 (10) | Takahashi (10-6) | **Clippard** (11-7) | | 29,424 | 68-92 |
| 161 | October 2 | @ Mets | 7 – 2 | Igarashi (1-1) | **Clippard** (11-8) | | 30,386 | 68-93 |
| 162 | October 3 | @ Mets | 2 – 1 (14) | **Peralta** (1-0) | Pérez (0-5) | **Batista** (2) | 30,849 | 69-93 |

== Player stats ==
=== Batting ===
Note: Pos = Position; G = Games played; AB = At bats; R = Runs scored; H = Hits; 2B = Doubles; 3B = Triples; HR = Home runs; RBI = Runs batted in; AVG = Batting average; SB = Stolen bases

Complete offensive statistics are available here.

| Pos | Player | G | AB | R | H | 2B | 3B | HR | RBI | AVG | SB |
|---|---|---|---|---|---|---|---|---|---|---|---|
| C | Iván "Pudge" Rodríguez | 111 | 398 | 32 | 106 | 18 | 1 | 4 | 49 | .266 | 2 |
| 1B | Adam Dunn | 158 | 558 | 85 | 145 | 36 | 2 | 38 | 103 | .260 | 0 |
| 2B | Adam Kennedy | 135 | 342 | 43 | 85 | 16 | 1 | 3 | 31 | .249 | 14 |
| SS | Ian Desmond | 154 | 525 | 59 | 141 | 27 | 4 | 10 | 65 | .269 | 17 |
| 3B | Ryan Zimmerman | 142 | 525 | 85 | 161 | 32 | 0 | 25 | 85 | .307 | 4 |
| LF | Josh Willingham | 114 | 370 | 54 | 99 | 19 | 2 | 16 | 56 | .268 | 8 |
| CF | Nyjer Morgan | 136 | 509 | 60 | 129 | 17 | 7 | 0 | 24 | .253 | 34 |
| RF | Michael Morse | 98 | 266 | 36 | 77 | 12 | 2 | 15 | 41 | .289 | 0 |
| OF | Roger Bernadina | 134 | 414 | 52 | 102 | 18 | 3 | 11 | 47 | .246 | 16 |
| 2B | Cristian Guzmán | 89 | 319 | 44 | 90 | 11 | 4 | 2 | 25 | .282 | 4 |
| OF | Willie Harris | 132 | 224 | 25 | 41 | 6 | 2 | 10 | 32 | .183 | 5 |
| IF | Alberto González | 114 | 186 | 19 | 46 | 8 | 1 | 0 | 5 | .247 | 0 |
| C | Wil Nieves | 59 | 158 | 10 | 32 | 8 | 0 | 3 | 16 | .203 | 0 |
| OF | Justin Maxwell | 67 | 104 | 16 | 15 | 6 | 0 | 3 | 12 | .144 | 5 |
| 2B | Danny Espinosa | 28 | 103 | 16 | 22 | 4 | 1 | 6 | 15 | .214 | 0 |
| C | Wilson Ramos | 15 | 52 | 3 | 14 | 4 | 0 | 1 | 4 | .269 | 0 |
| OF | Willy Taveras | 27 | 35 | 7 | 7 | 0 | 1 | 0 | 4 | .200 | 1 |
| LF | Kevin Mench | 27 | 27 | 2 | 3 | 0 | 0 | 0 | 1 | .111 | 0 |
| C | Carlos Maldonado | 4 | 11 | 1 | 3 | 0 | 0 | 1 | 3 | .273 | 0 |
| C | Jamie Burke | 1 | 0 | 0 | 0 | 0 | 0 | 0 | 0 | – | 0 |
| P | Liván Hernández | 35 | 61 | 2 | 9 | 1 | 0 | 1 | 3 | .148 | 0 |
| P | John Lannan | 25 | 44 | 1 | 4 | 2 | 0 | 0 | 4 | .091 | 0 |
| P | Craig Stammen | 36 | 38 | 2 | 9 | 3 | 0 | 0 | 6 | .237 | 0 |
| P | Scott Olsen | 17 | 24 | 0 | 2 | 0 | 0 | 0 | 0 | .083 | 0 |
| P | Luis Atilano | 126 | 25 | 0 | 1 | 0 | 0 | 0 | 0 | .040 | 0 |
| P | Jason Marquis | 17 | 22 | 1 | 3 | 1 | 0 | 0 | 2 | .136 | 0 |
| P | Stephen Strasburg | 12 | 20 | 0 | 1 | 0 | 0 | 0 | 1 | .050 | 0 |
| P | J. D. Martin | 10 | 12 | 0 | 2 | 1 | 0 | 0 | 0 | .167 | 0 |
| P | Jordan Zimmermann | 7 | 10 | 0 | 2 | 0 | 0 | 0 | 0 | .200 | 0 |
| P | Miguel Batista | 58 | 8 | 0 | 1 | 0 | 0 | 0 | 0 | .125 | 0 |
| P | Yunesky Maya | 5 | 7 | 0 | 1 | 0 | 0 | 0 | 0 | .143 | 0 |
| P | Ross Detwiler | 8 | 7 | 0 | 0 | 0 | 0 | 0 | 0 | .000 | 0 |
| P | Tyler Clippard | 78 | 2 | 0 | 1 | 0 | 0 | 0 | 0 | .500 | 0 |
| P | Joel Peralta | 39 | 3 | 0 | 0 | 0 | 0 | 0 | 0 | .000 | 0 |
| P | Tyler Walker | 24 | 2 | 0 | 0 | 0 | 0 | 0 | 0 | .000 | 0 |
| P | Matt Chico | 1 | 2 | 0 | 0 | 0 | 0 | 0 | 0 | .000 | 0 |
| P | Drew Storen | 54 | 2 | 0 | 1 | 0 | 0 | 0 | 0 | .500 | 0 |
| P | Garrett Mock | 1 | 2 | 0 | 0 | 0 | 0 | 0 | 0 | .000 | 0 |
| P | Jesse English | 7 | 0 | 0 | 0 | 0 | 0 | 0 | 0 | – | 0 |
| P | Matt Capps | 47 | 1 | 0 | 0 | 0 | 0 | 0 | 0 | .000 | 0 |
| P | Joe Bisenius | 5 | 0 | 0 | 0 | 0 | 0 | 0 | 0 | – | 0 |
| P | Jason Bergmann | 4 | 0 | 0 | 0 | 0 | 0 | 0 | 0 | – | 0 |
| P | Doug Slaten | 49 | 0 | 0 | 0 | 0 | 0 | 0 | 0 | – | 0 |
| P | Brian Bruney | 19 | 0 | 0 | 0 | 0 | 0 | 0 | 0 | – | 0 |
| P | Sean Burnett | 73 | 0 | 0 | 0 | 0 | 0 | 0 | 0 | – | 0 |
| P | Collin Balester | 17 | 0 | 0 | 0 | 0 | 0 | 0 | 0 | – | 0 |
| | Team totals | 162 | 5418 | 655 | 1355 | 250 | 31 | 149 | 634 | .250 | 110 |

=== Pitching ===
Table is sortable.

Note: Pos = Position; W = Wins; L = Losses; ERA = Earned run average; G = Games pitched; GS = Games started; SV = Saves; IP = Innings pitched; H = Hits allowed; R = Runs allowed; ER = Earned runs allowed; BB = Walks allowed; K = Strikeouts

Complete pitching statistics are available here.

| Pos | Player | W | L | ERA | G | GS | SV | IP | H | R | ER | BB | K |
|---|---|---|---|---|---|---|---|---|---|---|---|---|---|
| SP | Liván Hernández | 10 | 12 | 3.66 | 33 | 33 | 0 | 211.2 | 216 | 93 | 86 | 64 | 114 |
| SP | John Lannan | 8 | 8 | 4.65 | 25 | 25 | 0 | 143.1 | 175 | 82 | 74 | 49 | 71 |
| SP | Craig Stammen | 4 | 4 | 5.13 | 19 | 3 | 0 | 128.0 | 151 | 78 | 73 | 41 | 85 |
| SP | Luis Atilano | 6 | 7 | 5.15 | 16 | 16 | 0 | 85.2 | 96 | 56 | 49 | 32 | 40 |
| SP | Scott Olsen | 4 | 8 | 5.56 | 17 | 15 | 0 | 81.0 | 93 | 54 | 50 | 27 | 53 |
| SP | Jason Marquis | 2 | 9 | 6.60 | 13 | 13 | 0 | 58.2 | 76 | 47 | 43 | 24 | 31 |
| CL | Matt Capps | 3 | 3 | 2.74 | 47 | 0 | 26 | 46.0 | 51 | 20 | 14 | 9 | 38 |
| RP | Tyler Clippard | 11 | 8 | 3.07 | 78 | 0 | 1 | 91.0 | 69 | 33 | 31 | 41 | 112 |
| RP | Miguel Batista | 1 | 2 | 3.70 | 58 | 1 | 2 | 82.2 | 71 | 36 | 34 | 39 | 55 |
| RP | Sean Burnett | 1 | 7 | 2.14 | 73 | 0 | 3 | 63.0 | 52 | 17 | 15 | 20 | 62 |
| RP | Drew Storen | 4 | 4 | 3.58 | 54 | 0 | 5 | 55.1 | 48 | 24 | 22 | 22 | 52 |
| SP | Stephen Strasburg | 5 | 3 | 2.91 | 12 | 12 | 0 | 68.0 | 56 | 25 | 22 | 17 | 92 |
| | Joel Peralta | 1 | 0 | 2.02 | 39 | 0 | 0 | 49.0 | 30 | 12 | 11 | 9 | 49 |
| | J. D. Martin | 1 | 5 | 4.13 | 9 | 9 | 0 | 48.0 | 56 | 30 | 22 | 11 | 31 |
| | Doug Slaten | 4 | 1 | 3.10 | 49 | 0 | 0 | 40.2 | 34 | 18 | 14 | 19 | 38 |
| | Tyler Walker | 1 | 0 | 3.57 | 24 | 0 | 0 | 35.1 | 35 | 16 | 14 | 8 | 30 |
| SP | Jordan Zimmermann | 1 | 2 | 4.94 | 7 | 7 | 0 | 31.0 | 31 | 20 | 17 | 10 | 27 |
| | Ross Detwiler | 1 | 3 | 4.25 | 8 | 5 | 0 | 29.2 | 34 | 22 | 14 | 14 | 17 |
| | Yunesky Maya | 0 | 3 | 5.88 | 5 | 5 | 0 | 26.0 | 30 | 18 | 17 | 11 | 12 |
| | Collin Balester | 0 | 1 | 2.57 | 17 | 0 | 0 | 21.0 | 15 | 6 | 6 | 11 | 28 |
| | Brian Bruney | 1 | 2 | 7.64 | 19 | 0 | 0 | 17.2 | 21 | 18 | 15 | 20 | 16 |
| | Jesse English | 0 | 0 | 3.86 | 7 | 0 | 0 | 7.0 | 10 | 3 | 3 | 2 | 4 |
| | Matt Chico | 0 | 0 | 3.60 | 1 | 1 | 0 | 5.0 | 6 | 2 | 2 | 0 | 3 |
| | Joe Bisenius | 0 | 0 | 9.64 | 5 | 0 | 0 | 4.2 | 6 | 6 | 5 | 6 | 5 |
| | Garrett Mock | 0 | 0 | 5.40 | 1 | 1 | 0 | 3.1 | 4 | 2 | 11 | 5 | 3 |
| | Jason Bergmann | 0 | 1 | 15.43 | 4 | 0 | 0 | 2.1 | 3 | 4 | 4 | 1 | 2 |
| | Team totals | 69 | 93 | 4.13 | 162 | 162 | 37 | 1435.0 | 1469 | 742 | 658 | 512 | 1068 |

=== Team leaders ===
Qualifying players only.

==== Batting ====
| Stat | Player | Total |
|---|---|---|
| Avg. | Ryan Zimmerman | .307 |
| HR | Adam Dunn | 38 |
| RBI | Adam Dunn | 103 |
| R | Adam Dunn; Ryan Zimmerman | 85; 85 |
| H | Ryan Zimmerman | 161 |
| SB | Nyjer Morgan | 34 |

==== Pitching ====
| Stat | Player | Total |
|---|---|---|
| W | Tyler Clippard | 11 |
| L | Liván Hernández | 12 |
| ERA | Liván Hernández | 3.66 |
| SO | Liván Hernández | 114 |
| SV | Matt Capps | 26 |
| IP | Liván Hernández | 211.2 |

== Awards and honors ==
=== All-Stars ===
- Matt Capps, P

=== Annual awards ===
- Silver Slugger: Ryan Zimmerman, 3B

Ryan Zimmermann won the Silver Slugger Award for the second consecutive year, becoming the first Washington Nationals player to win two Silver Slugger Awards.

== Farm system ==
| Level | Team | League | Manager |
|---|---|---|---|
| AAA | Syracuse Chiefs | International League | Trent Jewett |
| AA | Harrisburg Senators | Eastern League | Randy Knorr |
| A | Potomac Nationals | Carolina League | Gary Cathcart |
| A | Hagerstown Suns | South Atlantic League | Matthew LeCroy |
| A-Short Season | Vermont Lake Monsters | New York–Penn League | Jeff Garber |
| Rookie | GCL Nationals | Gulf Coast League | Bobby Williams |

LEAGUE CHAMPIONS: Potomac
