= 2010 San Francisco Giants season =

Major League Baseball season

2010 San Francisco Giants
- World Series champions National League champions National League West champions
- League: National League
- Division: West
- Ballpark: AT&T Park
- City: San Francisco, California
- Record: 92–70 (56.8%)
- Divisional place: 1st place
- Owners: Bill Neukom (managing general partner)
- General managers: Brian Sabean
- Managers: Bruce Bochy
- Television: KNTV (NBC 11) (Jon Miller, Duane Kuiper, Mike Krukow); CSN Bay Area (Duane Kuiper, Mike Krukow, Dave Flemming)
- Radio: KNBR (680 AM) (Jon Miller, Dave Flemming, Duane Kuiper, Mike Krukow, F.P. Santangelo, J. T. Snow, Doug Greenwald); KIQI (1010 AM, Spanish) (Erwin Higueros, Tito Fuentes)

The 2010 San Francisco Giants season marked their 128th year in Major League Baseball, their 53rd year in San Francisco since their move from New York following the 1957 season, and their 11th in AT&T Park. The Giants won the National League West for the first time since the 2003 season and both the NLDS and NLCS for the first time since the 2002 season. They would go on to win the World Series, their first championship since moving to San Francisco in 1958. Giants catcher Buster Posey was awarded the National League Rookie of the Year Award.

On October 7, the Giants played their first playoff game since 2003. In the first game of their NLDS against the Atlanta Braves, Tim Lincecum struck out fourteen in a 1–0 victory over Derek Lowe, setting a franchise postseason strikeout record. On October 11, the Giants won their series against Atlanta, advancing to the National League Championship Series against the Philadelphia Phillies. On October 23, the Giants defeated the Phillies to advance to the World Series where they faced the Texas Rangers. On November 1, the Giants defeated the Rangers in Game 5 to win their first championship since 1954.

== Notable events ==
- December 29, 2009 — Giants sign free agent Mark DeRosa
- January 13 — Giants sign free agent Aubrey Huff
- April 15 — Giants trade outfielder Fred Lewis to the Toronto Blue Jays for a player to be named later or cash considerations
- May 29 — Giants promote catcher Buster Posey from AAA-Fresno and sign free agent outfielder Pat Burrell
- June 30 — Giants trade catcher Bengie Molina to the Texas Rangers for relief pitcher Chris Ray and a player to be named later
- July 4 — Pitchers Tim Lincecum and Brian Wilson are named to the 2010 Major League Baseball All-Star Game
- July 15 — Giants sign free agent Dontrelle Willis to a minor league deal
- July 31 — Giants trade pitcher Joe Martinez and minor-league outfielder John Bowker to the Pittsburgh Pirates for left-handed relief pitcher Javier López
- July 31 — Giants trade minor league pitcher Daniel Turpen to the Boston Red Sox in exchange for right-handed relief pitcher Ramón Ramírez
- August 11 — Giants trade minor league outfielder Evan Crawford to the Chicago Cubs for infielder Mike Fontenot
- August 13 — Giants acquire outfielder José Guillén from the Kansas City Royals for a player to be named later and cash
- August 23 — Giants claim outfielder Cody Ross off of waivers from the Florida Marlins
- October 23 — Giants defeat Philadelphia 3–2, winning the NLCS 4–2 and advancing to face the Texas Rangers in the 2010 World Series
- November 3 — The Giants and their fans celebrate the World Series victory with a parade from the Financial District to Civic Center in downtown San Francisco.
- November 15 — Buster Posey is named the National League Rookie of the Year

== Offseason and spring training ==
The Giants 23–12 record was good enough for second place in the Cactus League standings and was the best spring training record among National League teams.

== Season standings ==
=== National League West ===
NL West
Team	W	L	Pct.	GB	Home	Road
San Francisco Giants	92	70	.568	—	49‍–‍32	43‍–‍38
San Diego Padres	90	72	.556	2	45‍–‍36	45‍–‍36
Colorado Rockies	83	79	.512	9	52‍–‍29	31‍–‍50
Los Angeles Dodgers	80	82	.494	12	45‍–‍36	35‍–‍46
Arizona Diamondbacks	65	97	.401	27	40‍–‍41	25‍–‍56

=== National League Wild Card ===
Division leaders
Team	W	L	Pct.
Philadelphia Phillies	97	65	.599
San Francisco Giants	92	70	.568
Cincinnati Reds	91	71	.562

Wild Card team (Top team qualifies for postseason)
Team	W	L	Pct.	GB
Atlanta Braves	91	71	.562	—
San Diego Padres	90	72	.556	1
St. Louis Cardinals	86	76	.531	5
Colorado Rockies	83	79	.512	8
Florida Marlins	80	82	.494	11
Los Angeles Dodgers	80	82	.494	11
New York Mets	79	83	.488	12
Milwaukee Brewers	77	85	.475	14
Houston Astros	76	86	.469	15
Chicago Cubs	75	87	.463	16
Washington Nationals	69	93	.426	22
Arizona Diamondbacks	65	97	.401	26
Pittsburgh Pirates	57	105	.352	34

=== Record vs. opponents ===
2010 National League record Source: MLB Standings Grid – 2010
Team	AZ	ATL	CHC	CIN	COL	FLA	HOU	LAD	MIL	NYM	PHI	PIT	SD	SF	STL	WSH	AL
Arizona	–	3–4	1–6	2–5	9–9	3–3	4–3	5–13	3–4	5–1	2–4	2–4	8–10	5–13	4–5	3–4	6–9
Atlanta	4–3	–	4–2	3–2	2–4	11–7	5–1	5–3	5–2	11–7	8–10	6–3	4–2	4–3	2–6	8–10	9–6
Chicago	6–1	2–4	–	4–12	2–3	4–2	7–11	3–4	9–6	3–4	4–2	5–10	3–5	2–5	9–6	4–2	8–10
Cincinnati	5–2	2–3	12–4	–	2–5	5–2	10–5	5–4	11–3	4–2	2–5	10–6	2–4	3–4	6–12	4–3	8–7
Colorado	9–9	4–2	3–2	5–2	–	3–4	2–4	7–11	5–4	3–3	1–6	3–4	12–6	9–9	3–4	5–3	9–6
Florida	3–3	7–11	2–4	2–5	4–3	–	3–3	4–2	4–4	12–6	5–13	6–2	3–6	2–5	3–2	13–5	7–8
Houston	3–4	1–5	11–7	5–10	4–2	3–3	–	2–4	8–7	3–4	4–3	11–4	2–5	2–7	10–5	4–4	3–12
Los Angeles	13–5	3–5	4–3	4–5	11–7	2–4	4–2	–	4–2	3–4	2–4	4–3	8–10	8–10	3–4	3–3	4–11
Milwaukee	4–3	2–5	6–9	3–11	4–5	4–4	7–8	2–4	–	5–2	1–5	13–5	3–4	2–5	8–7	4–2	9–6
New York	1–5	7–11	4–3	2–4	3–3	6–12	4–3	4–3	2–5	–	9–9	6–1	3–3	3–4	3–3	9–9	13–5
Philadelphia	4–2	10–8	2–4	5–2	6–1	13–5	3–4	4–2	5–1	9–9	–	2–4	5–2	3–3	4–4	12–6	10–8
Pittsburgh	4–2	3–6	10–5	6–10	4–3	2–6	4–11	3–4	5–13	1–6	4–2	–	0–6	2–4	6–9	1–5	2–13
San Diego	10–8	2–4	5–3	4–2	6–12	6–3	5–2	10–8	4–3	3–3	2–5	6–0	–	12–6	3–4	3–3	9–6
San Francisco	13–5	3–4	5–2	4–3	9–9	5–2	7–2	10–8	5–2	4–3	3–3	4–2	6–12	–	3–3	4–2	7–8
St. Louis	5–4	6–2	6–9	12–6	4–3	2–3	5–10	4–3	7–8	3–3	4–4	9–6	4–3	3–3	–	3–3	9–6
Washington	4–3	10–8	2–4	3–4	3–5	5–13	4–4	3–3	2–4	9–9	6–12	5–1	3–3	2–4	3–3	–	5–13

== Game log ==
=== Regular season ===
Legend
Giants Win	Giants Loss	Postponed

2010 Game Log
April (13–9)

#	Date	Opponent	Score	Win	Loss	Save	Attendance	Record
1	April 5	@ Astros	5–2	Lincecum (1–0)	Oswalt (0–1)	Wilson (1)	43,836	1–0
2	April 6	@ Astros	3–0	Zito (1–0)	Rodríguez (0–1)	Wilson (2)	24,237	2–0
3	April 7	@ Astros	10–4	Affeldt (1–0)	Gervacio (0–1)		21,599	3–0
4	April 9	Braves	5–4 (13)	Affeldt (2–0)	Medlen (0–1)		42,940	4–0
5	April 10	Braves	7–2	Lowe (1–0)	Wellemeyer (0–1)		42,985	4–1
6	April 11	Braves	6–3	Lincecum (2–0)	Kawakami (0–1)	Affeldt (1)	38,062	5–1
7	April 12	Pirates	9–3	Zito (2–0)	Burres (0–1)		26,011	6–1
8	April 13	Pirates	6–5	Meek (1–0)	Affeldt (2–1)	Dotel (2)	28,030	6–2
9	April 14	Pirates	6–0	Sánchez (1–0)	Morton (0–2)		29,028	7–2
10	April 16	@ Dodgers	10–8	Padilla (1–1)	Wellemeyer (0–2)		49,319	7–3
11	April 17	@ Dodgers	9–0	Lincecum (3–0)	Haeger (0–1)		44,734	8–3
12	April 18	@ Dodgers	2–1	Troncoso (1–0)	Romo (0–1)	Broxton (1)	50,433	8–4
13	April 19	@ Padres	3–2	Stauffer (2–0)	Affeldt (2–2)		17,087	8–5
14	April 20	@ Padres	1–0	Latos (1–1)	Sánchez (1–1)	Bell (4)	17,822	8–6
15	April 21	@ Padres	5–2	Garland (1–2)	Wellemeyer (0–3)		14,906	8–7
16	April 23	Cardinals	4–1	Lincecum (4–0)	García (1–1)	Wilson (3)	42,860	9–7
17	April 24	Cardinals	2–0	Zito (3–0)	Wainwright (3–1)	Wilson (4)	41,785	10–7
18	April 25	Cardinals	2–0	Penny (3–0)	Cain (0–1)	Franklin (6)	40,230	10–8
19	April 26	Phillies	5–1	Sánchez (2–1)	Halladay (4–1)		30,035	11–8
20	April 27	Phillies	6–2	Wellemeyer (1–3)	Moyer (2–2)		31,792	12–8
21	April 28	Phillies	7–6 (11)	Madson (1–0)	Romo (0–2)	Figueroa (1)	32,369	12–9
22	April 30	Rockies	5–2	Zito (4–0)	Cook (1–3)	Affeldt (2)	37,144	13–9

May (14–14)

#	Date	Opponent	Score	Win	Loss	Save	Attendance	Record
23	May 1	Rockies	6–1	Cain (1–1)	Rogers (0–1)		39,211	14–9
24	May 2	Rockies	4–1	Chacín (1–0)	Sánchez (2–2)		41,831	14–10
25	May 4	@ Marlins	9–6 (12)	Runzler (1–0)	Badenhop (0–3)	Mota (1)	13,690	15–10
26	May 5	@ Marlins	3–2	Zito (5–0)	Robertson (2–3)	Wilson (5)	11,633	16–10
27	May 6	@ Marlins	6–3	Cain (2–1)	Nolasco (2–2)	Wilson (6)	12,804	17–10
28	May 7	@ Mets	6–4	Rodríguez (2–0)	Romo (0–3)		34,681	17–11
29	May 8	@ Mets	5–4 (11)	Takahashi (3–1)	Mota (0–1)		36,764	17–12
30	May 9	@ Mets	6–5	Romo (1–3)	Mejía (0–2)	Wilson (7)	35,641	18–12
31	May 11	Padres	3–2	Webb (1–1)	Zito (5–1)	Bell (9)	33,249	18–13
32	May 12	Padres	5–2	Richard (2–2)	Cain (2–2)	Bell (10)	30,924	18–14
33	May 13	Padres	1–0	Latos (3–3)	Sánchez (2–3)		32,861	18–15
34	May 14	Astros	8–2	Wellemeyer (2–3)	Paulino (0–6)		38,650	19–15
35	May 15	Astros	2–1	Lincecum (5–0)	Oswalt (2–5)	Wilson (8)	40,060	20–15
36	May 16	Astros	4–3	Zito (6–1)	Myers (2–3)	Wilson (9)	40,582	21–15
37	May 17	@ Padres	3–1	Richard (3–2)	Cain (2–3)	Bell (11)	20,558	21–16
38	May 18	@ Padres	7–6 (12)	Runzler (2–0)	Ramos (0–1)	Wilson (10)	19,565	22–16
39	May 19	@ Diamondbacks	13–1	Kennedy (3–2)	Wellemeyer (2–4)		17,073	22–17
40	May 20	@ Diamondbacks	8–7	Heilman (1–1)	Affeldt (2–3)	Qualls (7)	18,607	22–18
41	May 21	@ Athletics	6–1	Cahill (2–2)	Zito (6–2)		33,369	22–19
42	May 22	@ Athletics	1–0	Gonzalez (5–3)	Cain (2–4)	Bailey (7)	35,067	22–20
43	May 23	@ Athletics	3–0	Wuertz (1–0)	Sánchez (2–4)	Bailey (8)	35,067	22–21
44	May 25	Nationals	4–2	Wellemeyer (3–4)	Hernández (4–3)	Wilson (11)	27,981	23–21
45	May 26	Nationals	7–3	Atilano (4–1)	Lincecum (5–1)		30,230	23–22
46	May 27	Nationals	5–4	Casilla (1–0)	Burnett (0–2)	Wilson (12)	28,251	24–22
47	May 28	Diamondbacks	5–0	Cain (3–4)	Jackson (3–6)		31,495	25–22
48	May 29	Diamondbacks	12–1	Sánchez (3–4)	Buckner (0–3)		37,400	26–22
49	May 30	Diamondbacks	6–5 (10)	Wilson (1–0)	Rosa (0–1)		41,394	27–22
50	May 31	Rockies	4–0	Jiménez (10–1)	Lincecum (5–2)		42,465	27–23

June (13–14)

#	Date	Opponent	Score	Win	Loss	Save	Attendance	Record
51	June 1	Rockies	2–1 (11)	Betancourt (1–1)	Casilla (1–1)	Corpas (5)	31,198	27–24
52	June 2	Rockies	4–1	Cain (4–4)	Francis (1–2)	Wilson (13)	30,697	28–24
53	June 4	@ Pirates	6–4	Sánchez (4–4)	Duke (3–6)	Wilson (14)	17,817	29–24
54	June 5	@ Pirates	6–3	Maholm (4–4)	Wellemeyer (3–5)		36,687	29–25
55	June 6	@ Pirates	6–5 (10)	Wilson (2–0)	Dotel (2–1)	Casilla (1)	24,068	30–25
56	June 7	@ Reds	6–5	Romo (2–3)	Herrera (0–3)	Wilson (15)	18,457	31–25
57	June 8	@ Reds	3–0	Cain (5–4)	LeCure (1–2)		13,011	32–25
58	June 9	@ Reds	6–3	Harang (5–5)	Sánchez (4–5)		14,700	32–26
59	June 10	@ Reds	6–5	Rhodes (2–1)	Mota (0–2)	Cordero (17)	19,241	32–27
60	June 11	Athletics	6–2	Lincecum (6–2)	Gonzalez (6–4)	Wilson (16)	41,817	33–27
61	June 12	Athletics	5–4	Zito (7–2)	Sheets (2–6)	Wilson (17)	36,861	34–27
62	June 13	Athletics	6–2	Cain (6–4)	Mazzaro (2–1)	Casilla (2)	39,187	35–27
63	June 14	Orioles	10–2	Sánchez (5–5)	Tillman (0–3)		33,822	36–27
64	June 15	Orioles	4–1	Arrieta (2–0)	Martinez (0–1)	Hernandez (2)	35,498	36–28
65	June 16	Orioles	6–3	Lincecum (7–2)	Guthrie (3–8)	Wilson (18)	38,485	37–28
66	June 18	@ Blue Jays	3–2	Downs (2–5)	Zito (7–3)	Gregg (17)	18,667	37–29
67	June 19	@ Blue Jays	3–0	Camp (2–1)	Cain (6–5)	Gregg (18)	20,666	37–30
68	June 20	@ Blue Jays	9–6	Bautista (1–0)	Tallet (1–3)	Wilson (19)	21,431	38–30
69	June 22	@ Astros	3–1	Lincecum (8–2)	Oswalt (5–9)	Wilson (20)	29,777	39–30
70	June 23	@ Astros	6–3	Myers (5–5)	Zito (7–4)	Lindstrom (16)	29,311	39–31
71	June 24	@ Astros	7–5	Rodríguez (4–10)	Cain (6–6)	Lindstrom (17)	26,662	39–32
72	June 25	Red Sox	5–4	Sánchez (6–5)	Wakefield (2–6)	Wilson (21)	41,182	40–32
73	June 26	Red Sox	4–2	Atchison (1–1)	Bumgarner (0–1)	Papelbon (17)	42,178	40–33
74	June 27	Red Sox	5–1	Lester (9–3)	Lincecum (8–3)		41,528	40–34
75	June 28	Dodgers	4–2	Weaver (5–1)	Casilla (1–2)	Kuo (2)	34,626	40–35
76	June 29	Dodgers	4–2	Ely (4–5)	Cain (6–7)	Belisario (1)	35,289	40–36
77	June 30	Dodgers	8–2	Padilla (2–2)	Sánchez (6–6)		39,962	40–37

July (20–8)

#	Date	Opponent	Score	Win	Loss	Save	Attendance	Record
78	July 1	@ Rockies	7–3	Cook (3–5)	Bumgarner (0–2)		32,134	40–38
79	July 2	@ Rockies	6–3	Chacín (5–7)	Lincecum (8–4)	Street (2)	48,127	40–39
80	July 3	@ Rockies	11–8	Bautista (2–0)	Corpas (2–5)	Wilson (22)	49,271	41–39
81	July 4	@ Rockies	4–3 (15)	Flores (2–0)	Mota (0–3)		35,274	41–40
82	July 5	@ Brewers	6–1	Sánchez (7–6)	Loe (0–1)		36,185	42–40
83	July 6	@ Brewers	6–1	Bumgarner (1–2)	Wolf (6–8)		30,896	43–40
84	July 7	@ Brewers	15–2	Lincecum (9–4)	Narveson (7–6)		29,387	44–40
85	July 8	@ Brewers	9–3	Runzler (3–0)	Parra (3–6)		34,590	45–40
86	July 9	@ Nationals	8–1	Strasburg (3–2)	Cain (6–8)		34,723	45–41
87	July 10	@ Nationals	10–5	Casilla (2–2)	Clippard (8–6)		23,977	46–41
88	July 11	@ Nationals	6–2	Bumgarner (2–2)	Hernández (6–5)	Wilson (23)	22,403	47–41
89	July 15	Mets	2–0	Lincecum (10–4)	Dickey (6–3)		38,416	48–41
90	July 16	Mets	1–0	Zito (8–4)	Niese (6–4)	Wilson (24)	41,869	49–41
91	July 17	Mets	8–4	Cain (7–8)	Takahashi (7–4)	Wilson (25)	42,599	50–41
92	July 18	Mets	4–3 (10)	Rodríguez (3–2)	Wilson (2–1)		37,326	50–42
93	July 19	@ Dodgers	5–2	Bumgarner (3–2)	McDonald (0–1)	Wilson (26)	45,056	51–42
94	July 20	@ Dodgers	7–5	Casilla (3–2)	Broxton (3–2)	Affeldt (3)	53,381	52–42
95	July 21	@ Dodgers	2–0	Billingsley (8–5)	Zito (8–5)		45,151	52–43
96	July 22	@ Diamondbacks	3–0	Cain (8–8)	López (5–9)	Wilson (27)	17,230	53–43
97	July 23	@ Diamondbacks	7–4	Ray (3–0)	Jackson (6–9)	Wilson (28)	22,512	54–43
98	July 24	@ Diamondbacks	10–4	Bumgarner (4–2)	Kennedy (5–8)		32,774	55–43
99	July 25	@ Diamondbacks	3–2 (10)	Romo (3–3)	Vásquez (1–3)	Wilson (29)	31,278	56–43
100	July 26	Marlins	4–3	Nolasco (11–7)	Zito (8–6)	Núñez (24)	37,677	56–44
101	July 27	Marlins	6–4	Romo (4–3)	Sanches (0–2)	Wilson (30)	38,904	57–43
102	July 28	Marlins	10–9 (10)	Ray (4–0)	Hensley (1–4)		35,945	58–43
103	July 29	Marlins	5–0	Sánchez (8–6)	Bumgarner (4–3)		41,152	58–45
104	July 30	Dodgers	6–5	Lincecum (11–4)	Monasterios (3–3)	Ray (2)	42,847	59–45
105	July 31	Dodgers	2–1	Mota (1–3)	Broxton (3–3)		42,882	60–45

August (13–15)

#	Date	Opponent	Score	Win	Loss	Save	Attendance	Record
106	August 1	Dodgers	2–0	Cain (9–8)	Kershaw (10–6)	Wilson (31)	42,922	61–45
107	August 3	@ Rockies	10–0	Sánchez (8–6)	Cook (4–8)		43,549	62–45
108	August 4	@ Rockies	6–1	Jiménez (17–2)	Bumgarner (4–4)		37,278	62–46
109	August 5	@ Braves	3–2	Jurrjens (4–4)	Lincecum (11–5)	Wagner (26)	24,538	62–47
110	August 6	@ Braves	3–2 (11)	López (3–2)	Moylan (3–2)	Wilson (32)	42,178	63–47
111	August 7	@ Braves	3–0	Hudson (13–5)	Cain (9–9)	Wagner (27)	47,305	63–48
112	August 8	@ Braves	6–3	Lowe (11–9)	Sánchez (8–7)	Saito (1)	33,865	63–49
113	August 9	Cubs	4–3 (11)	Ray (5–0)	Mateo (0–1)		41,943	64–49
114	August 10	Cubs	8–6	Dempster (10–8)	Lincecum (11–6)		35,389	64–50
115	August 11	Cubs	5–4	Romo (5–3)	Berg (0–1)	Wilson (33)	36,139	65–50
116	August 12	Cubs	8–7	Wilson (3–1)	Cashner (1–5)		40,872	66–50
117	August 13	Padres	3–2	Richard (10–5)	Sánchez (8–8)	Bell (35)	42,722	66–51
118	August 14	Padres	3–2 (11)	Casilla (4–2)	Stauffer (3–2)		42,293	67–51
119	August 15	Padres	8–2	LeBlanc (7–10)	Lincecum (11–7)		42,834	67–52
120	August 17	@ Phillies	9–3	Oswalt (8–13)	Zito (8–7)		45,401	67–53
121	August 18	@ Phillies	8–2	Blanton (5–6)	Cain (9–10)		44,410	67–54
122	August 19	@ Phillies	5–2	Sánchez (9–8)	Hamels (7–10)	Wilson (34)	45,449	68–54
123	August 20	@ Cardinals	6–3	Bumgarner (5–4)	Westbrook (7–8)	Wilson (35)	43,822	69–54
124	August 21	@ Cardinals	5–1	Carpenter (14–4)	Lincecum (11–8)		44,477	69–55
125	August 22	@ Cardinals	9–0	García (11–6)	Zito (8–8)		42,638	69–56
126	August 23	Reds	11–2	Cain (10–10)	Volquez (3–2)		32,698	70–56
127	August 24	Reds	16–5	Casilla (5–2)	Wood (4–2)		36,104	71–56
128	August 25	Reds	12–11 (12)	Cordero (4–4)	Bumgarner (8–9)		36,310	71–57
129	August 27	Diamondbacks	6–0	Enright (5–2)	Lincecum (11–9)		38,013	71–58
130	August 28	Diamondbacks	11–3	Hudson (5–2)	Zito (8–10)		41,250	71–59
131	August 29	Diamondbacks	9–7	Cain (10–10)	Vásquez (1–5)	Wilson (36)	38,735	72–59
132	August 30	Rockies	2–1	Betancourt (5–1)	Wilson (3–2)	Street (13)	30,224	72–60
133	August 31	Rockies	5–2	Affeldt (4–3)	Belisle (6–5)	Wilson (37)	31,099	73–60

September (18–8)

#	Date	Opponent	Score	Win	Loss	Save	Attendance	Record
134	September 1	Rockies	2–1	Lincecum (12–9)	Jiménez (17–6)	Wilson (38)	31,186	74–60
135	September 3	@ Dodgers	4–2	Billingsley (11–8)	Zito (8–11)	Kuo (8)	43,046	74–61
136	September 4	@ Dodgers	5–4	López (4–2)	Broxton (5–5)	Wilson (39)	48,220	75–61
137	September 5	@ Dodgers	3–0	Sánchez (10–8)	Kuroda (10–12)	Wilson (40)	43,758	76–61
138	September 6	@ Diamondbacks	2–0 (11)	Casilla (6–2)	Heilman (5–7)	Wilson (41)	31,879	77–61
139	September 7	@ Diamondbacks	6–3	Lincecum (13–9)	Enright (6–3)	Affeldt (4)	19,417	78–61
140	September 8	@ Diamondbacks	3–1	Hudson (6–2)	Zito (8–12)	Gutiérrez (8)	19,972	78–62
141	September 9	@ Padres	7–3	Cain (11–10)	Garland (13–11)		28,456	79–62
142	September 10	@ Padres	1–0	Casilla (7–2)	Richard (12–7)	Wilson (42)	33,662	80–62
143	September 11	@ Padres	1–0	Stauffer (4–3)	Bumgarner (5–5)	Bell (40)	41,123	80–63
144	September 12	@ Padres	6–1	Lincecum (14–9)	Latos (14–6)		33,876	81–63
145	September 14	Dodgers	1–0	Kershaw (12–10)	Zito (8–13)		36,076	81–64
146	September 15	Dodgers	2–1	Cain (12–10)	Billingsley (11–10)	Wilson (43)	34,685	82–64
147	September 16	Dodgers	10–2	Sánchez (11–8)	Lilly (8–11)		38,434	83–64
148	September 17	Brewers	3–0	Wolf (12–11)	Bumgarner (5–6)		41,835	83–65
149	September 18	Brewers	2–1	Gallardo (13–7)	Lincecum (14–10)	Axford (22)	41,767	83–66
150	September 19	Brewers	9–2	Zito (9–13)	Narveson (11–8)		41,113	84–66
151	September 21	@ Cubs	1–0	Ramírez (1–3)	Cashner (2–6)	Wilson (44)	36,364	85–66
152	September 22	@ Cubs	2–0	Wells (8–13)	Sánchez (11–9)	Mármol (34)	37,285	85–67
153	September 23	@ Cubs	13–0	Bumgarner (6–6)	Dempster (14–11)		34,481	86–67
154	September 24	@ Rockies	2–1	Lincecum (15–10)	Chacín (9–10)	Wilson (45)	49,071	87–67
155	September 25	@ Rockies	10–9 (10)	Street (4–4)	Wilson (3–3)		43,402	87–68
156	September 26	@ Rockies	4–2	Cain (13–10)	de la Rosa (8–6)		32,594	88–68
157	September 28	Diamondbacks	4–2	Sánchez (12–9)	López (7–15)	Wilson (46)	37,449	89–68
158	September 29	Diamondbacks	3–1	Lincecum (16–10)	Kennedy (9–10)	Wilson (47)	38,228	90–68
159	September 30	Diamondbacks	4–1	Bumgarner (7–6)	Enright (6–7)	Ramírez (3)	37,261	91–68

October (1–2)

#	Date	Opponent	Score	Win	Loss	Save	Attendance	Record
160	October 1	Padres	6–4	Richard (14–9)	Cain (13–11)	Bell (46)	42,409	91–69
161	October 2	Padres	4–2	Stauffer (6–5)	Zito (9–14)	Bell (47)	42,653	91–70
162	October 3	Padres	3–0	Sánchez (13–9)	Latos (14–10)	Wilson (48)	42,822	92–70

=== Postseason ===
2010 Postseason Game Log
National League Division Series

Game	Date	Opponent	Score	Win	Loss	Save	Attendance	Series
1	October 7	Braves	1–0	Lincecum (1–0)	Lowe (0–1)		43,936	1–0
2	October 8	Braves	5–4 (11)	Farnsworth (1–0)	Ramírez (0–1)		44,046	1–1
3	October 10	@ Braves	3–2	Romo (1–0)	Kimbrel (0–1)	Wilson (1)	53,284	2–1
4	October 11	@ Braves	3–2	Bumgarner (1–0)	Lowe (0–2)	Wilson (2)	44,532	3–1

National League Championship Series

Game	Date	Opponent	Score	Win	Loss	Save	Attendance	Series
1	October 16	@ Phillies	4–3	Lincecum (1–0)	Halladay (0–1)	Wilson (1)	45,929	1–0
2	October 17	@ Phillies	6–1	Oswalt (1–0)	Sánchez (0–1)		46,099	1–1
3	October 19	Phillies	3–0	Cain (1–0)	Hamels (0–1)	Wilson (2)	43,320	2–1
4	October 20	Phillies	6–5	Wilson (1–0)	Oswalt (1–1)		43,515	3–1
5	October 21	Phillies	4–2	Halladay (1–1)	Lincecum (1–1)	Lidge (1)	43,713	3–2
6	October 23	@ Phillies	3–2	López (1–0)	Madson (0–1)	Wilson (3)	46,062	4–2

World Series

Game	Date	Opponent	Score	Win	Loss	Save	Attendance	Series
1	October 27	Rangers	11–7	Lincecum (1–0)	Lee (0–1)		43,601	1–0
2	October 28	Rangers	9–0	Cain (1–0)	Wilson (0–1)		43,622	2–0
3	October 30	@ Rangers	4–2	Lewis (1–0)	Sánchez (0–1)	Feliz (1)	52,419	2–1
4	October 31	@ Rangers	4–0	Bumgarner (1–0)	Hunter (0–1)		51,920	3–1
5	November 1	@ Rangers	3–1	Lincecum (2–0)	Lee (0–2)	Wilson (1)	52,045	4–1

== Roster ==
2010 San Francisco Giants
Roster
Pitchers: 41 Jeremy Affeldt; 53 Denny Bautista; 40 Madison Bumgarner; 18 Matt Cain; 46 Santiago Casilla; 60 Waldis Joaquín; 55 Tim Lincecum; 49 Javier López; 49 Joe Martinez; 49,52 Brandon Medders; 59 Guillermo Mota; 38 Brian Wilson; 52 Ramón Ramírez; 47 Chris Ray; 54 Sergio Romo; 45 Dan Runzler; 57 Jonathan Sánchez; 37 Todd Wellemeyer; 75 Barry Zito	Catchers: 28 Buster Posey; 22 Eli Whiteside; Infielders: 2 Emmanuel Burriss; 34 Matt Downs; 14 Mike Fontenot; 17 Aubrey Huff; 10 Travis Ishikawa; 48 Pablo Sandoval; 5 Juan Uribe; 16 Édgar Rentería; 29 Ryan Rohlinger; 21 Freddy Sanchez; Outfielders: 20 John Bowker; 9 Pat Burrell; 7 Mark DeRosa; 34 Darren Ford; 1,6 José Guillén; 13 Cody Ross; 33 Aaron Rowand; 12 Nate Schierholtz; 13,56 Andrés Torres; 8 Eugenio Vélez	Manager: 15 Bruce Bochy; Coaches: 6,1 Tim Flannery (third base); 26 Mark Gardner (bullpen); 39 Roberto Kelly (first base); 31 Hensley Meulens (hitting); 19 Dave Righetti (pitching); 23 Ron Wotus (bench)

== Season Summary-Regular Season ==
=== April ===
The Giants opened the season with a 5–2 win over the Houston Astros and won their first four games, including a thrilling 5–4 win over the Atlanta Braves in 13 innings in their home opener at AT&T Park. But they failed to put together a winning streak longer than 2 games for the rest of the month, losing four straight games between the 18th and 21st, though strong pitching often kept them in games despite an inconsistent offense. After a tough 7–6 loss to the Phillies in 11 innings on the 28th, the Giants rebounded for a 5–2 win over the Colorado Rockies to close out the month.

=== May ===
After taking two out of three from the Rockies, the Giants traveled to Florida to start a three-game series with the Marlins. They led the first game 5–3 behind Tim Lincecum's 13 strikeouts, but fell behind 6–5 in the eighth. Down to their last out, Aaron Rowand hit a home run to tie the game. The Giants won 9–6 in 12 innings and went on to sweep the series.

The team then went through a rough stretch, losing two out of three to the Mets before getting swept by the NL West leading San Diego Padres. They recovered a bit by sweeping the Astros, and splitting a two-game series with the Padres but then went on a five-game losing streak before snapping it with a win over the Washington Nationals. On May 29, Buster Posey was called up to the Giants and had three hits and three runs batted in during a 12–1 win over the Arizona Diamondbacks. That same day, the team signed Bay Area native Pat Burrell to a minor league contract. Padres CEO Jeff Moorad, Burrell's friend and his former agent, would later say he regretted not recruiting Burrell to the Padres. Originally signed as a bench player, Burrell played his way into the starting lineup and wound up hitting .266 with 18 home runs and 51 runs batted in over 96 games. The team would end May with a flourish, winning 5 of their last 7 games.

=== June ===
The Giants continued their strong play into the month of June. Though they lost the first series of the month to the Rockies, they won 3 out of their next 4 series, including completing a sweep of the Oakland Athletics, who had swept them the previous month. In the second half of the month, the team collapsed, losing their next 5 series in a row and ended the month with a 5-game losing streak culminating in a three-game sweep by the rival Dodgers. On June 30, the Giants traded Bengie Molina to the Texas Rangers, clearing the way for Buster Posey to become the everyday catcher.

=== July ===
The month of July marked a very strong comeback for the team, although it did not start off well. The Giants started the month with a 4-game series against the Rockies and lost the first two, extending their losing streak to 7. After coming back to win the third game despite losing a six-run lead early on, the Giants suffered an arduous 15-inning defeat to Colorado in the fourth game on July 4, putting their record at 41–40. The Giants immediately bounced back and went on a surge, coming back to sweep a 4-game series against the Brewers. They went on to win six of the next seven series during the month, including a sweep against the Diamondbacks, with the only blemish being a 4-game split with the Marlins, the most noteworthy of the four being a game in which the Giants led 9–2 at one point only to see the Marlins battle back to tie it. The game was won by the Giants in the bottom of the 10th inning when Andrés Torres hit a game-winning single for his fourth hit of the game, making the final score 10–9. On July 20, the Giants beat the Dodgers 7–5 at Dodger Stadium after trailing 5–1 at one point. On July 31, Burrell hit a 2-run home run in the eighth inning to lead the Giants to another comeback win over the Dodgers. Overall, the team went 20–8 during the month, finishing July with a 60–45 record. Pitchers Tim Lincecum and Brian Wilson were selected for the All-Star Game.

=== August ===
After their strong July, the Giants stumbled throughout August. Ace starting pitcher Tim Lincecum, who started the month with an 11–4 record and a 3.15 ERA, lost his edge, going 0–5 with a 7.82 ERA over the month. The Giants lost series against the Braves, Cardinals, Phillies, and Diamondbacks, though they took three out of four from the Chicago Cubs early in the month. After scoring blowout wins in the first two games of a three-game series against the Cincinnati Reds, the Giants trailed 10–1 in the third game but scored six runs in the eighth and ended up taking an 11–10 lead. But the Reds came back to tie it in the top of the 9th after Drew Stubbs reached 2nd base on a throwing error by Pablo Sandoval, and Brian Wilson gave up a game-tying single to Paul Janish. Then in the top of the 12th inning, Barry Zito, in a rare relief appearance, gave up the go-ahead hit to Joey Votto. Though the Giants got the tying run to third base on singles by Sandoval and Mike Fontenot in the bottom of the inning, they did not score and lost the game 12–11. The Giants then lost three of their next five games, ending the month 13–15 overall, as the calendar turned to September. The Padres, however, would go on a 10-game losing streak starting on August 26. Three days prior to the start of the Padres losing streak, the Giants acquired Cody Ross off waivers from the Florida Marlins to block him going to the Padres. Ross didn't do much offensively for the rest of the regular season but would become a major factor in the postseason.

=== September ===
On September 10, the Giants defeated the Padres to tie for first place in the NL West after trailing the Padres by 7 and a half games on July 4. For the next 15 days, each team traded the top spot. Then the Giants began a four-game winning streak to take over first place, taking the lead for good on September 26. Their lead would grow to three games entering the final three games of the season against the Padres as the Giants won 18 of the 26 games they played during the month. Lincecum also rebounded from his poor August, posting a record of 5–1 and striking out fifty two while walking only six.

The Giants pitching staff posted historic numbers for the month of September, going a record 18 straight games giving up 3 runs or less. (The last team to accomplish that feat was the 1917 Chicago White Sox.) Their 1.78 team ERA was the lowest in a month since divisional play started in 1969.

=== October ===
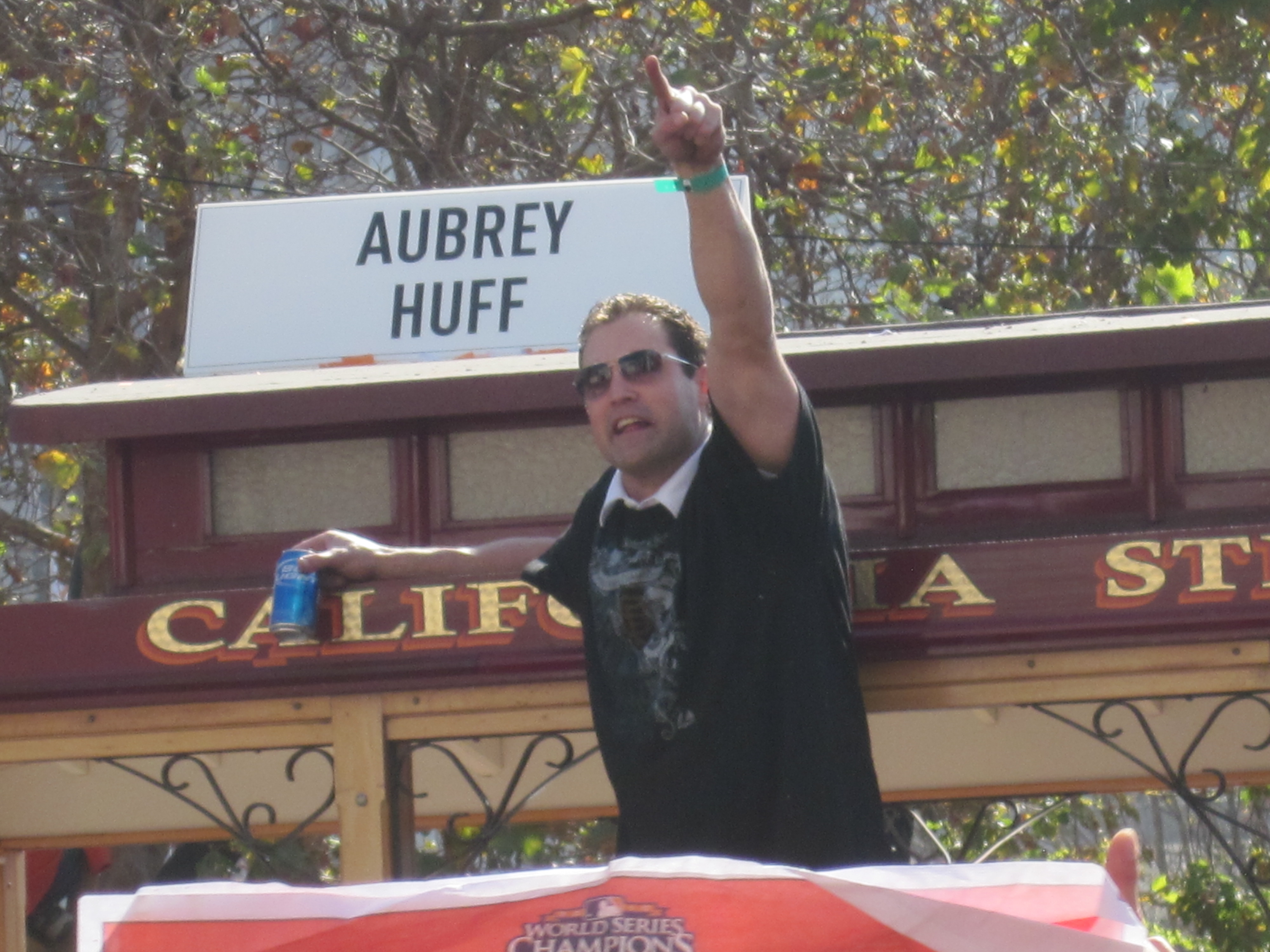
Pat Burrell in the Giants' 2010 World Series victory parade

The Giants entered the three-game series with the Padres needing just one win to clinch the NL West. They lost the first two games by scores of 6–4 and 4–2 before clinching the NL West with a 3–0 win on the final day of the regular season, finishing with a 92–70 record. It was the Giants' first NL West division title since 2003. Because the Atlanta Braves also defeated the Phillies that day, they clinched the NL Wild Card, eliminating the Padres from contention. The Giants would face the Braves in the NLDS starting October 7.

== Postseason ==
=== National League Division Series ===
San Francisco won the series, 3–1.

Game	Date	Score	Location	Time	Attendance
1	October 7	Atlanta Braves – 0, San Francisco Giants – 1	AT&T Park	2:26	43,936
2	October 8	Atlanta Braves – 5, San Francisco Giants – 4 (11 innings)	AT&T Park	3:47	44,046
3	October 10	San Francisco Giants – 3, Atlanta Braves – 2	Turner Field	3:23	53,284
4	October 11	San Francisco Giants – 3, Atlanta Braves – 2	Turner Field	2:56	44,532

The NLDS was a close, hard-fought series. Tim Lincecum tossed a complete game two-hit shutout and struck out a franchise postseason record 14 in the opener as the Giants won 1–0. In game two, the Giants took a 4–0 lead behind Matt Cain's stellar pitching and Pat ("The Bat") Burrell's first inning three-run homer. But the Braves fought back, tying the score with three runs in the eighth, then winning in the 11th inning 5–4 on Rick Ankiel's home run as the series shifted to Atlanta.

In game three Jonathan Sánchez struck out 11 and carried a no-hitter into the sixth inning. The Giants led 1–0 in the eighth until Eric Hinske's pinch-hit two-run homer gave the Braves the lead. Rookie righthander Craig Kimbrel came out of the bullpen to start the top of the ninth for the Braves, relieving Jonny Venters who had struck out the side the previous inning. Kimbrel retired Cody Ross on a popout to Brooks Conrad for the first out. Travis Ishikawa pinch-hit for reliever Sergio Romo and drew a walk. After striking out leadoff man Andrés Torres, Kimbrel gave up a two-strike single to second baseman Freddy Sanchez and was lifted, leaving runners on first and second with two outs. Another rookie Brave, lefty Michael Dunn, came on and gave up a two-strike, game-tying single to Aubrey Huff. Right-hander Peter Moylan relieved Dunn and induced a grounder from Buster Posey which bounced through Conrad's legs, the second baseman's third error of the game. Sanchez scored on the play, giving the Giants a 3–2 lead. Kyle Farnsworth came on and got the third out, but the damage was done. The Giants brought in their closer Brian Wilson for the bottom of the ninth. He held the lead, giving up a single to Brian McCann but retiring Nate McLouth on a grounder to end the game and earn a clutch save.

With their backs against the wall, the Braves sent Derek Lowe to the mound on three days' rest. They scored first in the bottom of the third when Brian McCann's sacrifice fly drove in Omar Infante.

Lowe took a no-hitter into the sixth inning, but the Giants tied the game with one out on Cody Ross' first-pitch homer off a Lowe cutter. Brian McCann answered with another in the bottom of the inning off Giants' rookie starter Madison ("Mad Bum") Bumgarner to take back the lead. After Lowe walked Aubrey Huff and allowed an infield single to Buster Posey with one out in the seventh, Bobby Cox, managing his last game after a long and distinguished career in Toronto and Atlanta, went to the mound apparently to remove Lowe from the game. But after talking to him, Cox elected to leave Lowe in, prompting huge cheers from the Atlanta fans.

The next batter, Pat Burrell, walked on a 3–1 pitch near the inside corner, and Lowe's night was done after striking out eight while allowing only two hits and walking two. Relievers Peter Moylan and Jonny Venters couldn't hold the lead, as the Giants promptly scored two runs on Juan Uribe's RBI fielder's choice and Cody Ross' RBI single. The Braves might have been able to escape the one-out, bases-loaded jam unscathed and still ahead 2–1 if not for shortstop Álex González's bases-loading throwing error, his second in the game. Both errors were debatable. The first was a ball hit in the hole he didn't field cleanly with the speedy Andrés Torres running, earlier in the game. The second call was more controversial. With two on and one out and fielding a weakly hit groundball, González elected to throw to second but threw high to second baseman Omar Infante, who was ruled to have come off the base jumping for the throw.

Left-handed Giants reliever Javier López entered the game with two outs in the eighth and pinch-runner Nate McLouth the potential tying run at second base, and struck out slugging rookie sensation Jason Heyward. In the bottom of the ninth, the Braves had one last chance to rally. With one out, Giants closer Brian Wilson walked Rick Ankiel and Eric Hinske to put the potential tying and winning runs on base. But Omar Infante struck out swinging and Melky Cabrera grounded out to end the game and the series in Cox's final game as a manager, both teams giving him a standing ovation after the final out, which was almost not made: slick-fielding Travis Ishikawa had to stretch up and out as far as he could while just managing to keep his toe on the bag as he snow-coned the high, wide throw from third near the tip of the pocket of his first baseman's mitt.

=== National League Championship Series ===
San Francisco won the series, 4-2.

Game	Date	Score	Location	Time	Attendance
1	October 16	San Francisco Giants – 4 Philadelphia Phillies – 3	Citizens Bank Park	2:59	45,929
2	October 17	San Francisco Giants -1 @ Philadelphia Phillies – 6	Citizens Bank Park	3:01	46,099
3	October 19	Philadelphia Phillies – 0 @ San Francisco Giants – 3	AT&T Park	2:39	43,320
4	October 20	Philadelphia Phillies – 5 @ San Francisco Giants – 6	AT&T Park	3:40	43,515
5	October 21	Philadelphia Phillies – 4 @ San Francisco Giants – 2	AT&T Park	3:15	43,713
6	October 23	San Francisco Giants – 3 @ Philadelphia Phillies – 2	Citizens Bank Park	3:41	46,062

The Giants then advanced to the NLCS to face the heavily favored Philadelphia Phillies, who were looking for their third straight pennant. Behind two home runs by NLCS MVP Cody Ross and a strong start from Tim Lincecum, the Giants won Game 1, 4–3. The Phillies easily took Game 2 with a 6–1 win over Jonathan Sánchez before the series shifted to San Francisco for the next three games. Matt Cain and the Giants won Game 3, 3–0, for a 2–1 series lead.

A heart-stopping, crucial Game 4 saw the Giants take an early 2–0 lead. After the Phillies scored four runs in the top of the fifth, the Giants got a run back on an Aubrey Huff single up the middle in the bottom of the fifth, which scored Andrés Torres. In the sixth inning, Pat Burrell drew a leadoff walk and advanced to third on a Cody Ross double. Pablo Sandoval came to the plate and appeared to double down the right field line, but the ball hugged the line and was called foul. Four pitches later, however, Sandoval lined a two-run double sharply into the left-center field gap, scoring Burrell and Ross and giving the Giants a 5–4 lead.

The Phillies tied the score in the top of the eighth with back-to-back doubles by Ryan Howard and Jayson Werth. Giants reliever Sergio Romo recovered to retire the next three Phillies and strand Werth at second, retaining the 5–5 tie. Giants closer Brian Wilson retired the Phillies 1-2-3 in the top of the ninth.

In the bottom of the ninth, Game 2 winner Roy Oswalt volunteered for a rare relief appearance. With one out Huff singled past a diving Howard. Posey followed with a single to right —- his fourth hit of the game -— that enabled Huff to reach third. Juan Uribe, batting for Wilson, followed with a sacrifice fly to deep left field that scored Huff with the winning run. The victory gave the Giants a commanding 3–1 series lead.

With a chance to wrap up the NL pennant at home, Lincecum got the start in game 5. Although the Giants scored first, Philadelphia took a 4–2 win, aided by a series of Giants defensive miscues that allowed the Phillies to score three runs in the third inning, to send the series back to Philadelphia.

Game 6 saw Giant starter Jonathan Sánchez give up two early runs, but San Francisco rallied against Phillies starter Roy Oswalt in the third inning. Sánchez led off with a single, and took second when leadoff man Andrés Torres' long fly to the wall in center was dropped by Shane Victorino. Freddy Sanchez sacrificed the runners to second and third, and Aubrey Huff hit a single up the middle, which scored Sánchez before Victorino nailed Torres at home. But Huff took second base on the throw home and eventually scored on second baseman Plácido Polanco's throwing error to tie it up at 2–2. In the bottom of the inning, Sánchez lost his control by yielding a leadoff walk and then hitting Chase Utley with a pitch; Sanchez then lost his poise, prompting both benches to empty and glare at one another before order was restored. Replacing Sanchez, Lefty Jeremy Affeldt escaped the jam and retired six in a row. Manager Bruce Bochy then called on starter Madison Bumgarner, who survived two rocky innings without allowing a run, and Javier López, who retired the side in order in the seventh. With two outs in the top of the eighth, Juan Uribe hit an opposite field drive just over the right field barrier for a solo home run to give the Giants their first lead at 3–2.

Starter Tim Lincecum, who had pitched 7 innings two days earlier, then entered the game in a relief role. He struck out Werth after falling behind 2–0, but then yielded back-to-back singles to Victorino and Raúl Ibáñez, prompting Bochy to bring in closer Brian Wilson. First baseman Huff then atoned for a critical Game 5 error by gloving a sharp line drive from Carlos Ruiz and easily doubling off Victorino at second to end the inning.

In the bottom of the ninth Wilson got pinch-hitter Ross Gload to ground out, but then walked leadoff man Jimmy Rollins. Plácido Polanco grounded to Uribe, who forced Rollins at second. Utley then drew a walk, moving the potential tying run to second and putting the potential winning run on first. With a full count and the runners moving on the pitch, Wilson froze slugger Ryan Howard with a called third strike on a cutter that just caught the bottom of the strike zone to send the Giants on to the World Series.

=== World Series ===
NL San Francisco Giants (4) vs. AL Texas Rangers (1)

Game	Date	Score	Location	Time	Attendance
1	October 27	Texas Rangers – 7, San Francisco Giants – 11	AT&T Park	3:36	43,601
2	October 28	Texas Rangers – 0, San Francisco Giants – 9	AT&T Park	3:17	43,622
3	October 30	San Francisco Giants – 2, Texas Rangers – 4	Rangers Ballpark in Arlington	2:51	52,419
4	October 31	San Francisco Giants – 4, Texas Rangers – 0	Rangers Ballpark in Arlington	3:09	51,920
5	November 1	San Francisco Giants – 3, Texas Rangers – 1	Rangers Ballpark in Arlington	2:32	52,045

The 2010 World Series pitted the Giants against the Texas Rangers, who had just won their first pennant. Game 1, in San Francisco because the National League had won the All-Star Game, saw Lincecum face lefty Cliff Lee, who had had a stellar first postseason for the Phillies the year before. Texas took a 1–0 lead in the first, but Lincecum induced a double play to limit the damage. Lee wasn't sharp, though, and gave up seven runs, one of them unearned because Rangers manager Ron Washington had gambled on putting veteran slugging designated hitter Vladimir Guerrero ("Bad Vlad") in AT&T Park's super-spacious right field which he simply could not cover and misplayed more than one would-be single into extra bases. Uribe hit a three-run home run in the sixth to extend a 5–2 lead to 8–2. Entering the ninth, the Giants were up 11–4 before the Rangers scored three essentially meaningless runs to make the final score 11–7.

Game 2 was a pitcher's duel between Matt Cain and lefty C. J. Wilson. The game was scoreless until the bottom of the fifth, when Édgar Rentería hit a solo home run. Cain went 7 2/3 innings, allowing only four hits. Uríbe singled in another run in the seventh to extend the lead to 2–0, but in the eighth things fell apart for the Rangers as their bullpen imploded and the Giants scored seven runs. The Giants won Game 2, 9–0.

The series shifted to Texas for the next (which proved to be the last) three games. Behind a solo home run by superstar slugger Josh Hamilton and an earlier three-run blast by rookie first baseman Mitch Moreland in support of a strong start by Colby Lewis, the Rangers defeated Jonathan Sánchez in Game 3, 4–2. Game 4 was played on a hot, sultry Halloween night. Designated hitter Huff in the third (with a man on) and catcher Posey in the eighth hit home runs, while Bumgarner pitched eight shutout innings as the Giants won 4–0, Wilson finishing up in a non-save situation.

Game 5 was a pitching rematch of Game 1 between former Cy Young Award winners Cliff Lee and Tim Lincecum. Down 3–1 in the series, the Rangers needed a win in their ballpark to send the Series back to San Francisco or the Giants would return home as champions. What resulted was the pitching duel anticipated, but not realized, in Game 1. Both Lee and Lincecum pitched six shutout innings, with Lincecum allowing only two hits and Lee three. In the top of the seventh inning, Ross and Uríbe singled back to back to put two runners on with none out. The next hitter, Huff, who had never laid down a bunt in his major league career, sacrificed successfully, with only a quick pickup and crisp, accurate throw by Lee to just get Huff at first saved a bases-loaded, nobody out dilemma for Texas. Runners were now at second and third with one out for Burrell, whom Lee struck out after a struggle for the second out, preserving the scoreless tie for the moment. Shortstop Édgar Rentería, who had hit a walk-off single in Game 7 off Cleveland's Charles Nagy to win the 1997 World Series for Jim Leyland and his Florida Marlins in extra innings, now came to the plate. His two years with San Francisco had been considered a major disappointment, marred by injuries and slumps, but here in the World Series he became an unlikely hero by launching a three-run homer to left. After Nelson Cruz answered with a solo homer in the seventh, Lincecum shut the door on the Rangers, giving up just three hits and striking out ten in eight innings of work. Brian Wilson then retired the side in order in the ninth for the Series-winning save and first-time baseball world championships not just for the Giants (for the first time in 56 years) but for San Francisco, since the Giants' five other world championships were won in New York (in 1905, 1921, 1922, 1933 and 1954). Rentería was named World Series MVP for hitting .412 with two home runs (including the Series winner) and six RBI. It was Bochy's first world championship as a player or manager, having played as a second-string catcher for eight years and having managed the Padres and Giants for sixteen.

The firsts with the championship were:

- Giants:
  - Championship since 1954, when in New York.
  - Championship since moving to San Francisco.
- City and County of San Francisco:
  - World Series championship.
  - Major sports championship since the 49ers won Super Bowl XXIX in 1995.
- San Francisco Bay Area:
  - World Series championship since the Oakland Athletics swept the Giants in 1989.
  - Major sports championship since the 49ers win in Super Bowl XXIX.

In summing up the firsts, Larry Baer, the president of the Giants and a fourth generation resident of San Francisco, said that the team dedicated the championship to everyone who has worn a Giants uniform, and all Giants fans since the team's move to San Francisco, honoring 53 years of baseball in the city.

== Regular season stats ==
=== Batting ===
Note: G = Games played; AB = At bats; R = Runs scored; H = Hits; 2B = Doubles; 3B = Triples; HR = Home runs; RBI = Runs batted in; AVG = Batting average; SB = Stolen bases

Player	G	AB	R	H	2B	3B	HR	RBI	AVG	SB
Aubrey Huff	157	569	100	165	35	5	26	86	.290	7
Pablo Sandoval	152	563	61	151	34	3	13	63	.268	3
Cody Ross	153	525	71	141	28	3	14	65	.269	0
Juan Uribe	148	521	64	129	24	2	24	85	.248	1
Andrés Torres	139	507	84	136	43	8	16	63	.268	26
Freddy Sanchez	111	431	55	126	22	1	7	47	.292	3
Buster Posey	108	406	58	124	23	2	18	67	.305	0
Aaron Rowand	105	331	42	76	12	2	11	34	.230	5
Pat Burrell	96	289	41	77	16	0	18	51	.266	0
Edgar Rentería	72	243	26	67	11	2	3	22	.276	3
Mike Fontenot	103	240	24	68	13	3	1	25	.283	0
Nate Schierholtz	137	227	34	55	13	3	3	17	.242	4
Bengie Molina	61	202	17	52	6	0	3	17	.257	0
Travis Ishikawa	116	158	18	42	11	0	3	22	.266	0
José Guillén	42	128	9	34	5	0	3	15	.266	0
Eli Whiteside	56	126	19	30	6	1	4	10	.238	1
Mark DeRosa	26	93	9	18	3	0	1	10	.194	0
Tim Lincecum	33	67	2	7	0	0	0	5	.104	0
Matt Cain	33	66	3	7	1	0	0	1	.106	0
Jonathan Sánchez	32	58	2	8	0	1	0	3	.138	0
Eugenio Vélez	29	55	7	9	2	0	2	8	.164	0
Barry Zito	32	51	1	6	0	0	0	2	.118	0
Madison Bumgarner	20	39	2	7	1	0	0	3	.179	0
Todd Wellemeyer	13	20	2	2	0	0	0	0	.100	0
Ryan Rohlinger	12	15	1	3	0	0	0	1	.200	0
Emmanuel Burriss	7	5	3	2	0	0	0	0	.400	0
Brian Wilson	69	5	0	0	0	0	0	0	.000	0
Sergio Romo	67	2	0	0	0	0	0	0	.000	0
Jeremy Affeldt	51	1	0	0	0	0	0	0	.000	0
Denny Bautista	29	1	0	1	0	0	0	1	1.000	0
Javier López	27	0	0	0	0	0	0	0	.000	0
Guillermo Mota	55	1	0	0	0	0	0	0	.000	0
Dan Runzler	40	1	0	0	0	0	0	0	.000	0
Santiago Casilla	49	0	0	0	0	0	0	0	.000	0
Darren Ford	7	0	1	0	0	0	0	0	.000	2
Waldis Joaquín	4	0	0	0	0	0	0	0	.000	0
Brandon Medders	14	0	0	0	0	0	0	0	.000	0
Ramón Ramírez	25	0	0	0	0	0	0	0	.000	0
Chris Ray	28	0	0	0	0	0	0	0	.000	0
Team totals	162	5488	697	1411	284	30	162	660	.257	55

=== Pitching ===
Note: W = Wins; L = Losses; ERA = Earned run average; G = Games pitched; GS = Games started; SV = Saves; IP = Innings pitched; R = Runs allowed; ER = Earned runs allowed; BB = Walks allowed; K = Strikeouts

Player	W	L	ERA	G	GS	SV	IP	H	R	ER	BB	K
Matt Cain	13	11	3.14	33	33	0	223.1	181	84	78	61	177
Tim Lincecum	16	10	3.43	33	33	0	212.1	194	84	81	76	231
Barry Zito	9	14	4.15	34	33	0	199.1	184	97	92	84	150
Jonathan Sánchez	13	9	3.07	34	33	0	193.1	142	74	66	96	205
Madison Bumgarner	7	6	3.00	18	18	0	111.0	119	40	37	26	86
Brian Wilson	3	3	1.81	70	0	48	74.2	62	16	15	26	93
Sergio Romo	5	3	2.18	68	0	0	62.0	46	16	15	14	70
Todd Wellemeyer	3	5	5.68	13	11	0	58.2	57	37	37	35	41
Santiago Casilla	7	2	1.95	52	0	2	55.1	40	14	12	26	56
Guillermo Mota	1	3	4.33	56	0	1	54.0	49	29	26	22	38
Jeremy Affeldt	4	3	4.14	53	0	4	50.0	56	25	23	24	44
Denny Bautista	2	0	3.74	31	0	0	33.2	25	14	14	27	44
Dan Runzler	3	0	3.03	41	0	0	32.2	29	12	11	20	37
Ramón Ramírez	1	0	0.67	25	0	1	27.0	13	3	2	11	15
Chris Ray	3	0	4.13	28	0	1	24.0	24	11	11	9	15
Javier López	2	0	1.42	27	0	0	19.0	11	3	3	2	16
Brandon Medders	0	0	7.20	14	0	0	15.0	26	12	12	6	8
Waldis Joaquín	0	0	9.64	4	0	0	4.2	6	6	5	7	2
Team totals	92	70	3.36	162	162	57	1461.0	1279	583	546	578	1331

== Postseason stats ==
=== Batting ===
Note: G = Games played; AB = At Bats; R = Runs scored; H = Hits; 2B = Doubles; 3B = Triples; HR = Home runs; RBI = Runs batted in; AVG = Batting average; SB = Stolen bases

Player	G	AB	R	H	2B	3B	HR	RBI	AVG	SB
Buster Posey	15	59	6	17	3	0	1	5	.288	1
Freddy Sanchez	15	63	5	17	4	0	0	4	.270	0
Andrés Torres	15	58	6	16	4	0	1	3	.276	2
Aubrey Huff	15	56	7	15	2	0	1	8	.268	0
Cody Ross	15	51	11	15	5	0	5	10	.294	0
Juan Uribe	4	14	0	1	0	0	0	1	.071	0
Pat Burrell	4	10	1	2	1	0	1	3	.200	0
Pablo Sandoval	2	6	0	1	0	0	0	0	.167	0
Mike Fontenot	3	6	1	1	0	1	0	0	.167	0
Nate Schierholtz	4	4	0	1	0	0	0	0	.250	0
Jonathan Sánchez	1	3	0	0	0	0	0	0	.000	0
Tim Lincecum	1	2	0	0	0	0	0	0	.000	0
Edgar Rentería	2	2	0	2	0	0	0	0	1.000	0
Aaron Rowand	2	2	0	1	0	0	0	0	.500	0
Travis Ishikawa	10	10	2	2	1	0	0	1	.200	0
Madison Bumgarner	1	2	0	0	0	0	0	0	.000	0
Matt Cain	1	2	0	1	0	0	0	1	.500	0
Santiago Casilla	1	0	0	0	0	0	0	0	.000	0
Brian Wilson	3	0	0	0	0	0	0	0	.000	0
Ramón Ramírez	1	0	0	0	0	0	0	0	.000	0
Javier López	2	0	0	0	0	0	0	0	.000	0
Sergio Romo	2	0	0	0	0	0	0	0	.000	0

=== Pitching ===
Note: W = Wins; L = Losses; ERA = Earned run average; G = Games pitched; GS = Games started; SV = Saves; IP = Innings pitched; R = Runs allowed; ER = Earned runs allowed; BB = Walks allowed; K = Strikeouts

Player	W	L	ERA	G	GS	SV	IP	H	R	ER	BB	K
Tim Lincecum	1	0	0.00	1	1	0	9.0	2	0	0	1	14
Jonathan Sánchez	0	0	1.23	1	1	0	7.1	2	1	1	1	11
Matt Cain	0	0	0.00	1	1	0	6.2	7	1	0	2	6
Madison Bumgarner	2	0	2.18	4	3	0	20.2	18	5	5	5	18
Brian Wilson	0	0	0.00	3	0	2	4.0	2	1	0	2	5
Ramón Ramírez	0	1	4.50	1	0	0	2.0	1	1	1	0	1
Santiago Casilla	0	0	0.00	1	0	0	1.2	1	0	0	0	2
Sergio Romo	1	0	40.50	2	0	0	0.2	3	3	3	0	0
Javier López	0	0	0.00	2	0	0	0.2	0	0	0	0	2

== Farm system ==
Level	Team	League	Manager
AAA	Fresno Grizzlies	Pacific Coast League	Steve Decker
AA	Richmond Flying Squirrels	Eastern League	Andy Skeels
A	San Jose Giants	California League	Brian Harper
A	Augusta GreenJackets	South Atlantic League	Dave Machemer
A-Short Season	Salem-Keizer Volcanoes	Northwest League	Tom Trebelhorn
Rookie	AZL Giants	Arizona League	Mike Goff

LEAGUE CHAMPIONS: San Jose
