= Joe Bisenius =

American baseball player (born 1982)

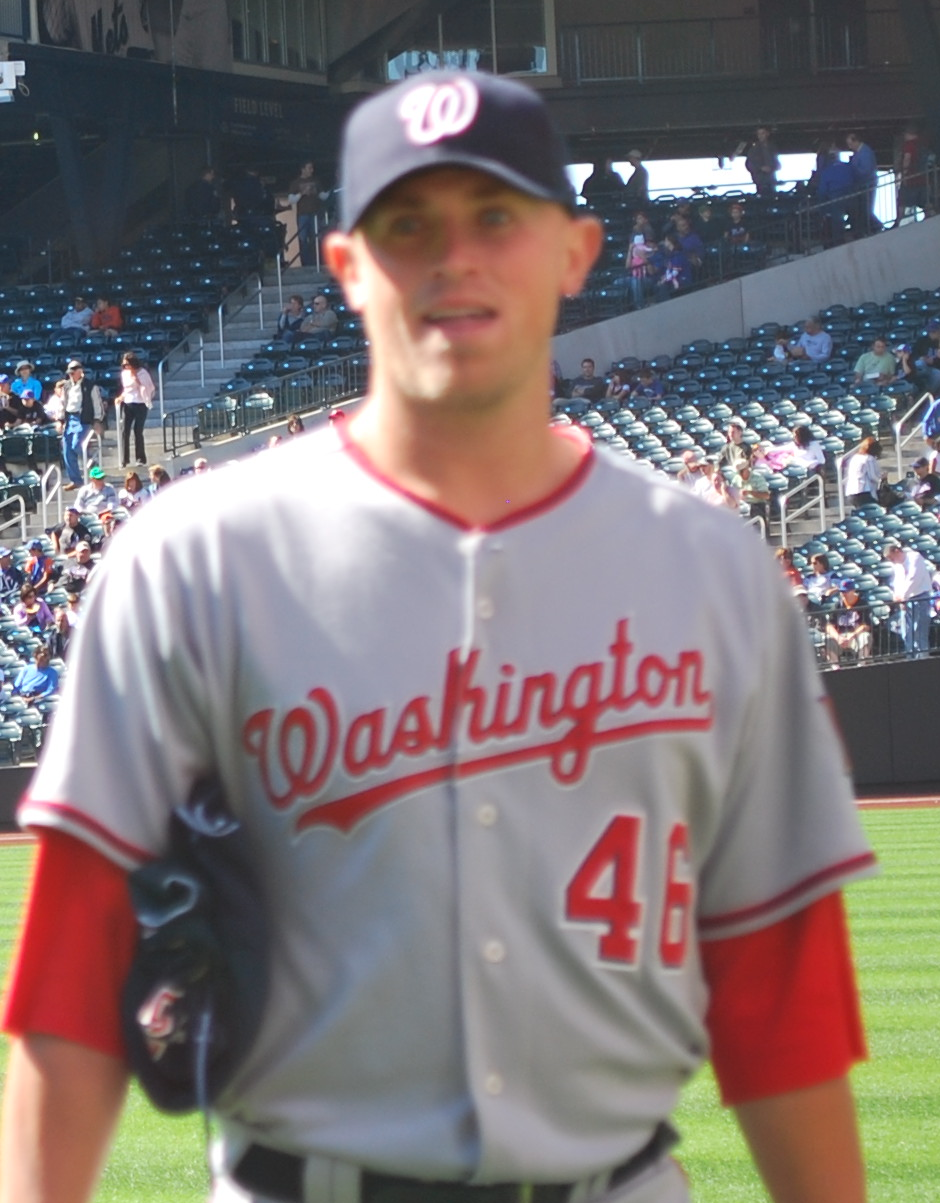
- Bisenius with the Nationals in 2010
- Pitcher
- Born: September 18, 1982 (age 43); Sioux City, Iowa, U.S.
- Batted: Right Threw: Right

MLB debut
- April 5, 2007, for the Philadelphia Phillies

Last appearance
- September 27, 2010, for the Washington Nationals

MLB statistics
- Win–loss record: 0–0
- Earned run average: 6.75
- Strikeouts: 8
- Stats at Baseball Reference

Teams
- Philadelphia Phillies (2007); Washington Nationals (2010)

Joseph Richard Bisenius (born September 18, 1982) is an American former professional baseball pitcher and current area scout for the Minnesota Twins. He played in Major League Baseball (MLB) for the Philadelphia Phillies and Washington Nationals.

== College and draft ==
Bisenius attended Iowa Western Community College and then Oklahoma State University. He left Oklahoma State after one semester when he realized the Cowboys wanted to use him as a relief pitcher. He finished his college baseball career at Oklahoma City University. He was drafted by the Phillies in the 2004 draft in the 12th round, after not signing with the Expos in 2003.

== Professional career ==
=== Philadelphia Phillies ===
==== 2004–2005 ====
Bisenius began his career as a starter at Low–A Batavia, going 0–1 with a 1.43 earned run average (ERA) in 11 starts. The next season with the Single–A Lakewood BlueClaws, Bisenius was converted to a reliever, posting a 6–4 record in 40 games, striking out 56 batters in 64 1/3 innings.

==== 2006–2007 ====
Bisenius earned a promotion to the High-A Clearwater Threshers for the 2006 season, where he pitched his way to a 4–1 record with a 1.93 ERA. He also struck out 62 batters, this time in only half a season before his promotion to the Double–A Reading Phillies. He posted a 4–2 record for the new team, pitching 23 1/3 innings and striking out 33 batters. In 2007, Bisenius made the Phillies' Opening Day roster, and made his Major League debut in a relief appearance on April 5, 2007. However, he returned to the minors, only to post a 3–4 record, struggling to a 5.48 ERA.

==== 2008 ====
Due to his pitching problems in the previous season, Bisenius started 2008 at Reading. After pitching to a 3.62 ERA, though with a losing record, he was promoted to the Triple–A Lehigh Valley IronPigs. He posted an 0–1 record and an 11.81 ERA in 4 appearances, but was recalled to the majors on July 13, 2008, replacing R. J. Swindle. Bisenius became a roster victim when the Phillies acquired Joe Blanton from the Oakland Athletics, as he was optioned back to Lehigh Valley without pitching in a game.

==== 2009 ====
In 2009, Bisenius did not appear in the major leagues, and instead split the season between the rookie–level Gulf Coast League Phillies, High–A Clearwater, Double–A Reading, and Triple–A Lehigh Valley. In 20 combined appearances, he accumulated an 8.10 ERA with 37 strikeouts across 26 2/3 innings of work.

On March 29, 2010, Bisenius was released by the Phillies organization.

=== Washington Nationals ===
On May 7, 2010, Bisenius signed a minor league contract with the Washington Nationals organization. He split time between the High–A Potomac Nationals, Double–A Harrisburg Senators, and Triple–A Syracuse Nationals, logging a cumulative 3.05 ERA in 34 appearances. On September 7, the Nationals selected Bisenius' contract, adding him to the major league roster. In five appearances for Washington, he allowed six runs (five earned) on six hits and six walks with five strikeouts across 4 2/3 innings of work. Following the season on November 11, Bisenius was removed from the 40-man roster and sent outright to Triple–A. However, Bisenius rejected the assignment and instead elected free agency.

On December 20, 2010, Bisenius re–signed with the Nationals on a new minor league contract that included an invitation to spring training. Prior to the season on March 31, 2011, he was released by the Nationals organization.

=== Chicago White Sox ===
On April 14, 2011, Bisenius signed a minor league contract with the Chicago White Sox organization. In 19 games (16 starts) split between the Double–A Birmingham Barons and Triple–A Charlotte Knights, he registered a 6–1 record and 3.00 ERA with 76 strikeouts across 87.0 innings of work. Bisenius elected free agency following the season on November 2.

=== Rieleros de Aguascalientes ===
On March 16, 2012, Bisenius signed with the Rieleros de Aguascalientes of the Mexican League. In 15 starts for Aguascalientes, he posted a 6–6 record and 5.12 ERA with 66 strikeouts across 84 1/3 innings pitched. On June 9, Bisenius was released by the Rieleros.

=== Saraperos de Saltillo ===
On June 14, 2012, Bisenius signed with the Saraperos de Saltillo of the Mexican League. He made 7 starts for the club down the stretch, logging a 3–4 record and 4.53 ERA with 36 strikeouts in 43 2/3 innings of work.

=== Lincoln Saltdogs ===
On February 13, 2013, Bisenius signed with the Lincoln Saltdogs of the American Association of Independent Professional Baseball. In 6 starts, he worked to a 3–2 record and 3.89 ERA with 43 strikeouts across 37.0 innings pitched.

=== Atlanta Braves ===
On June 20, 2013, the Atlanta Braves organization purchased Bisenius' contract from Lincoln. He spent the remainder of the year with the Triple–A Gwinnett Braves, also appearing in one game for the Double–A Mississippi Braves. In 13 games for Gwinnett, he pitched to a 3–7 record and 6.00 ERA with 35 strikeouts in 48.0 innings of work.

=== Lincoln Saltdogs (second stint) ===
On March 7, 2014, Bisenius signed a contract to return to the Lincoln Saltdogs of the American Association of Professional Baseball. In 13 starts for Lincoln, he recorded a 6–2 record and 3.46 ERA with 100 strikeouts in 80 2/3 innings of work.

=== Acereros de Monclova ===
On July 9, 2014, Bisenius signed with the Acereros de Monclova of the Mexican League. He made only one start for the team, allowing five runs on ten hits with one strikeout in 4 1/3 innings.

=== Olmecas de Tabasco ===
On July 15, 2014, Monclova traded Bisenius to the Olmecas de Tabasco. He spent the remainder of the year with the team, making 5 appearances (4 starts) and registering a 5.95 ERA with 19 strikeouts in 19 2/3 innings pitched.

== Post-playing career ==
In 2018, Bisenius was hired by the Minnesota Twins as an area scout.
