= Jesse English =

American baseball player (born 1984)

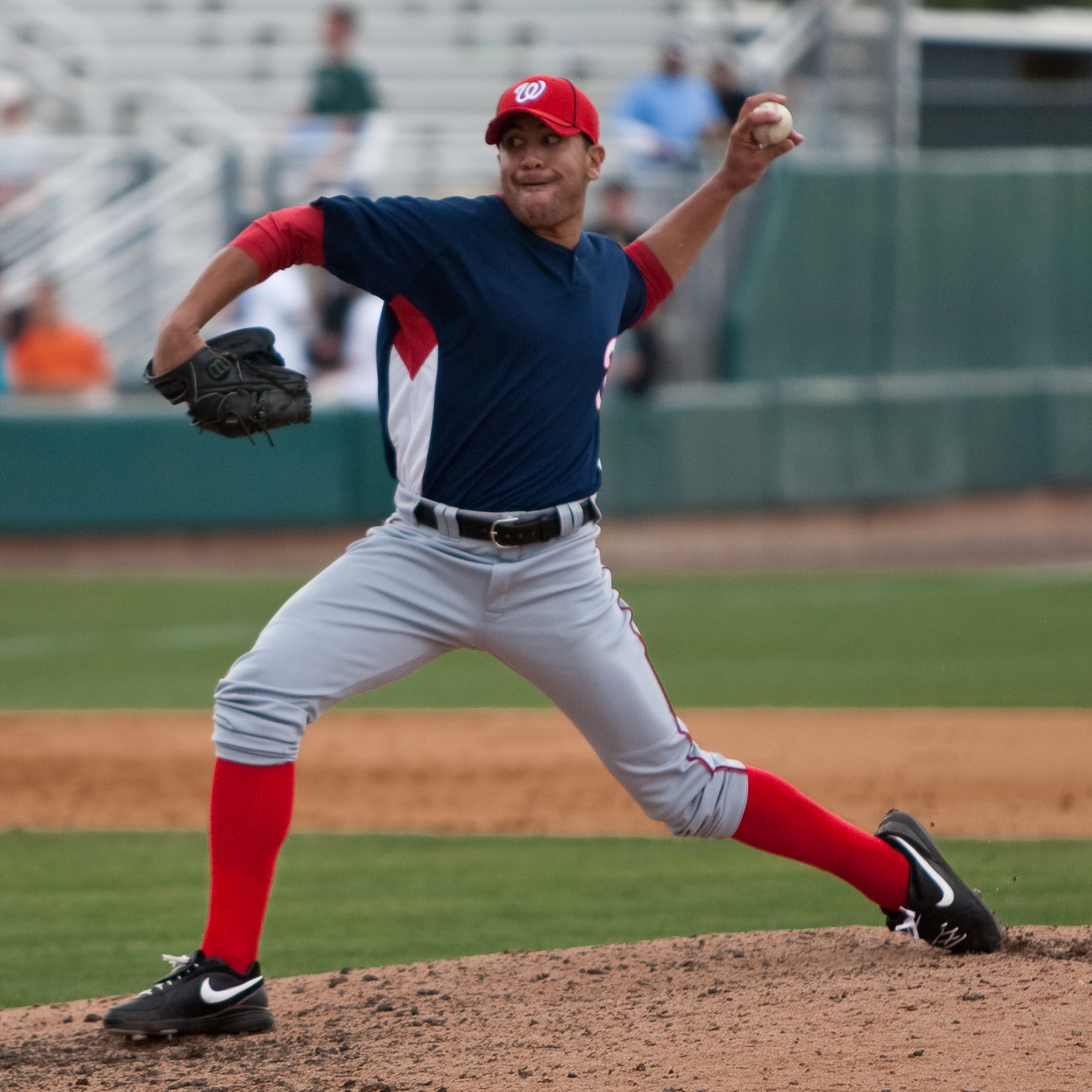
- English with the Washington Nationals
- Pitcher
- Born: September 13, 1984 (age 41); Oceanside, California, U.S.
- Batted: Left Threw: Left

Professional debut
- MLB: April 5, 2010, for the Washington Nationals
- CPBL: June 20, 2013, for the EDA Rhinos

Last appearance
- MLB: April 20, 2010, for the Washington Nationals
- CPBL: June 21, 2013, for the EDA Rhinos

MLB statistics
- Win–loss record: 0–0
- Earned run average: 3.86
- Strikeouts: 4

CPBL statistics
- Win–loss record: 0–0
- Earned run average: 0.00
- Strikeouts: 1
- Stats at Baseball Reference

Teams
- Washington Nationals (2010); EDA Rhinos (2013)

Jesse Logan English (born September 13, 1984) is an American former professional baseball pitcher. He played in Major League Baseball (MLB) for the Washington Nationals in 2010, and in the Chinese Professional Baseball League (CPBL) for the EDA Rhinos in 2013.

== Playing career ==
=== San Francisco Giants ===
English played for the Arizona League Giants in 2002 and 2003. In 2002, he went 4-1 with a 2.68 ERA in 12 games started, striking out 68 batters in 47 innings. In 2003, he went 0-1 with a 3.98 ERA in seven games (six starts), striking out 31 batters in 20 1/3 innings. English played for the Hagerstown Suns in 2004, going 0-1 with a 7.48 ERA in 17 games (four starts). He missed all of 2005 due to injury, and in 2006 he went 3-0 with a 6.35 ERA in 17 relief appearances with the Salem-Keizer Volcanoes. English struck out 40 batters in 28 1/3 innings that season.

English split the 2007 season between the Volcanoes and San Jose Giants, going a combined 5-1 with a 1.31 ERA in 15 games. In 34 1/3 innings, he struck out 57 batters. In 2008, he played for San Jose, going 13-7 with a 3.19 ERA in 26 games started. He struck out 135 batters in 135 1/3 innings of work.

=== Washington Nationals ===
English was claimed off waivers by the Washington Nationals on September 10, 2009.

Although English had never pitched above Double-A, he performed well enough to make the Nationals' Opening Day roster out of spring training, and made his debut on April 5, 2010—opening day—against the Philadelphia Phillies, pitching 1 1/3 innings in an 11-1 loss. After John Lannan was racked with seven hits, and issuing three walks, and allowing five runs in 3 2/3 innings, English entered the game with the bases loaded and slugger Ryan Howard at the plate. Howard grounded out to end the inning, and English retired the side in order the following inning.

English pitched well in April, accumulating a 3.86 ERA, and holding left-handed hitters to a .188 batting average. But injuries to position players forced the Nationals to call up position players, and so he was optioned to Triple-A Syracuse at the end of the month.

=== Cleveland Indians ===
English signed a minor league contract with the Cleveland Indians on March 24, 2011. He was subsequently assigned to the Low-A Mahoning Valley Scrappers. English was released on June 3, prior to the start of the Scrappers' season.

=== St. Paul Saints ===
In August 2011, English pitched with the St. Paul Saints of the American Association of Independent Professional Baseball. In 11 appearances, he went 0-1 with a 1.76 ERA with a save, striking out 19 over 15 1/3 innings.

=== Bridgeport Bluefish ===
English spent all of 2012 with the Bridgeport Bluefish of the Atlantic League of Professional Baseball. In 42 appearances, he went 3-0 with a 3.48 ERA, striking out 57 in 54 1/3 innings.

=== Broncos de Reynosa ===
English began 2013 with the Broncos de Reynosa of the Mexican League.

=== EDA Rhinos ===
English pitched in 25 games for Reynosa before signing with the EDA Rhinos of the Chinese Professional Baseball League. He appeared in only 2 games before being released.

=== Bridgeport Bluefish (second stint) ===
On July 15, 2013, English re-signed with Bridgeport.

=== Sioux City Explorers ===
English signed with the Sioux City Explorers of the American Association of Independent Professional Baseball and played for them during the 2014 season.

== Post-playing career ==
English is currently listed as baseball coach at Rancho Buena Vista High School in Vista, California, where he graduated from.

English acted as the pitching coach for the Cal State San Marcos Cougars in 2024.
