= Sean Burnett =

American baseball player (born 1982)

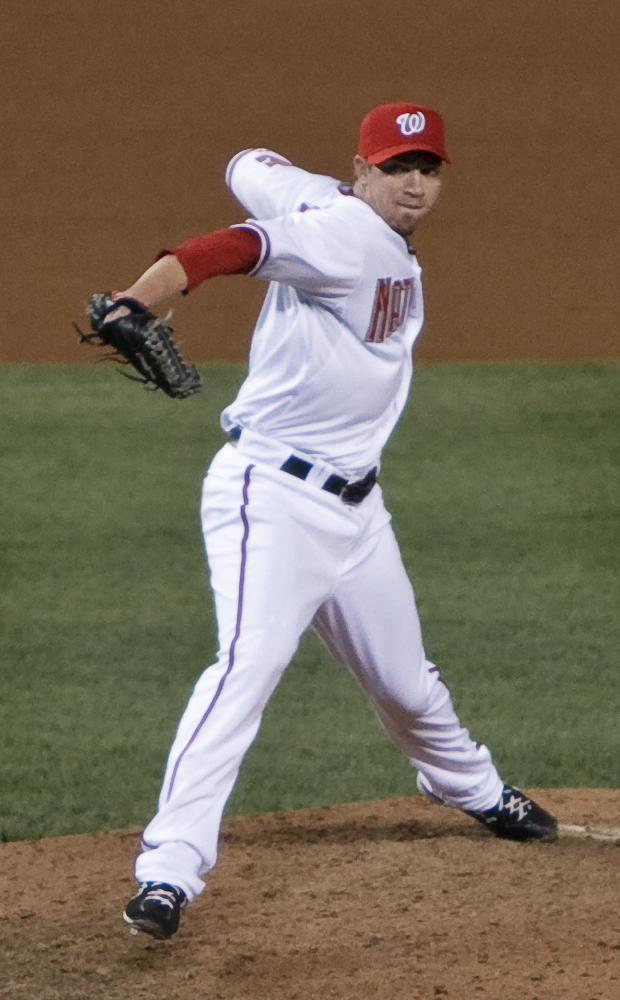
- Burnett with the Washington Nationals
- Pitcher
- Born: September 17, 1982 (age 43); Dunedin, Florida, U.S.
- Batted: Left Threw: Left

MLB debut
- May 30, 2004, for the Pittsburgh Pirates

Last MLB appearance
- September 30, 2016, for the Washington Nationals

MLB statistics
- Win–loss record: 15–23
- Earned run average: 3.52
- Strikeouts: 277
- Stats at Baseball Reference

Teams
- Pittsburgh Pirates (2004, 2008–2009); Washington Nationals (2009–2012); Los Angeles Angels of Anaheim (2013–2014); Washington Nationals (2016)
Medals
Men's baseball
Representing United States
World Youth Baseball Championship
Gold medal – first place	1998 Fairview Heights	Team

Sean Richard Burnett (born September 17, 1982) is an American former professional baseball relief pitcher. He played in Major League Baseball (MLB) for the Pittsburgh Pirates, Los Angeles Angels of Anaheim, and Washington Nationals.

== Amateur career ==
Burnett attended Wellington High School in Wellington, Florida. He was also a part of the 1999 State Champions.

== Professional career ==
=== Pittsburgh Pirates ===
Burnett was drafted by the Pittsburgh Pirates in the first round in 2000 Major League Baseball draft. Known for his change-up, remarkable control, presence, and a low-90s fastball. Burnett was the Pirates Minor League Pitcher of the Year in 2001 and 2002, and 2002 Carolina League Pitcher of the Year. Baseball America named him the Carolina League's #1 prospect, and the Pirates #2 prospect. Baseball America after 2002: “Burnett was anointed as the Hillcats' ace--and he rarely disappointed. A left-hander with a 91 mph fastball and the league's best changeup, he did his part to help create a winning attitude on the field. Batters found it difficult to drive the ball in the air against him because he pitches down in the strike zone.” His velocity improved in 2002, hitting 93 mph (150 km/h). His changeup is his best pitch, he also has a good slider. Knowles: “He needs to improve his breaking ball, he makes a lot of mistakes with it, but he throws enough strikes with his other pitches that he gets by with it.”

After sporting a 14–6 record with the Double-A Altoona Curve in 2003, Burnett advanced to the Triple-A Nashville Sounds for 2004. He was recalled by the Pirates, and made his major league debut on May 30, 2004, against the Chicago Cubs. Burnett pitched five solid innings, allowing only one run, but did not get a decision in the game. He finished the 2004 season with a 5–5 record and a 5.02 ERA.

Burnett missed the entire 2005 campaign with shoulder and elbow problems which eventually culminated in surgery. He spent the 2006 and 2007 seasons with the Triple-A Indianapolis Indians. After a stellar 2008 spring training, Burnett was returned to Triple-A, as the Pirates decided to keep Rule 5 pitcher Evan Meek in his place.

Meek was designated for assignment on May 4, 2008, and Burnett was recalled to take his place. Burnett made his first major league appearance since August 21, 2004 on May 6, 2008, against the San Francisco Giants. He allowed 2 runs in 2/3 of an inning. Said Burnett of his return: "Honestly, it might have been more nerve-racking than my debut because my debut came so easy. It was such an easy road coming up through the Minor Leagues. This one was so much more hard work, and harder to get here, and a lot more time."

Burnett had a 4.54 earned run average (ERA) in 160 2/3 innings pitched for the Pirates from 2004 to 2009.

=== Washington Nationals ===
On June 30, 2009, the Pirates traded Burnett along with Nyjer Morgan to the Washington Nationals for Lastings Milledge and Joel Hanrahan.

Burnett had a 2.98 ERA in 145 innings pitched for the Nationals from 2009 to 2011.

In 2012, Burnett went 1–2 with 2 saves and a 2.38 ERA with 56.2 innings in 70 appearances. On November 1, Burnett declined his half of a 2013 mutual option worth $3.5 million. Since the Nationals exercised their half, Burnett wasn't paid a $250K buyout.

=== Los Angeles Angels ===
On December 5, 2012, Burnett agreed to a two-year, $9.5 million contract with the Los Angeles Angels of Anaheim, pending a physical examination. The contract became official on December 12. On August 7, 2013, Burnett underwent elbow surgery and it prematurely ended his 2013 season.

After being almost a full year out, Burnett came back to pitch for the Angels in May 2014; after 3 appearances, Burnett was placed back on the disabled list. After an MRI, it was revealed Burnett had a torn UCL, ending his 2014 season. The Angels declined his 2015 option on October 30, making him a free agent.

=== Washington Nationals (second stint) ===
On November 16, 2015, Burnett signed a minor league contract with the Washington Nationals. While Burnett did not allow a run during spring training, he was informed on April 1, 2016, that he had not made the team. He chose to exercise an opt-out clause in his contract and become a free agent.

=== Los Angeles Dodgers ===
Burnett agreed to a minor league contract with the Los Angeles Dodgers on April 9, 2016. In seven appearances for the Triple-A Oklahoma City Dodgers, Burnett recorded a 2.35 ERA with five strikeouts across 7 2/3 innings pitched.

=== Atlanta Braves ===
On May 2, 2016, Burnett opted out of his deal with the Dodgers and signed a minor league contract with the Atlanta Braves. He made six scoreless appearances for the Triple-A Gwinnett Braves, recording five strikeouts over 5 1/3 innings pitched. Burnett opted out of his contract and became a free agent on May 20.

=== Minnesota Twins ===
On May 23, 2016, Burnett signed a minor league contract with the Minnesota Twins. In 29 appearances for the Triple-A Rochester Red Wings, Burnett compiled an 0–3 record and 2.15 ERA with 18 strikeouts and three saves across 29 1/3 innings pitched.

=== Washington Nationals (third stint) ===
On August 19, 2016, Burnett was traded to the Washington Nationals in exchange for cash considerations; he was subsequently assigned to the Nationals' Triple-A affiliate, the Syracuse Chiefs. On September 2, the Nationals selected Burnett's contract, adding him to their active roster, and he made his first major league appearance since 2014 the following day, coming out of the Nationals' bullpen in a game against the division rival New York Mets at Citi Field. He faced one batter, Curtis Granderson, and retired him on a lineout.

=== Philadelphia Phillies ===
On December 10, 2016, Burnett signed a minor league contract with the Philadelphia Phillies organization. He was released prior to the start of the season on March 26, 2017.

=== Miami Marlins ===
On March 13, 2018, Burnett signed a minor league contract with the Miami Marlins. He was released on June 18, 2018.

=== New York Mets ===
On February 7, 2019, Burnett signed a minor league contract with the New York Mets. In five appearances for the Triple-A Syracuse Mets, he struggled to a 15.63 ERA with two strikeouts over 6 1/3 innings pitched. On May 26, Burnett retired from professional baseball.
