= Luis Atilano =

Puerto Rican baseball player (born 1985)

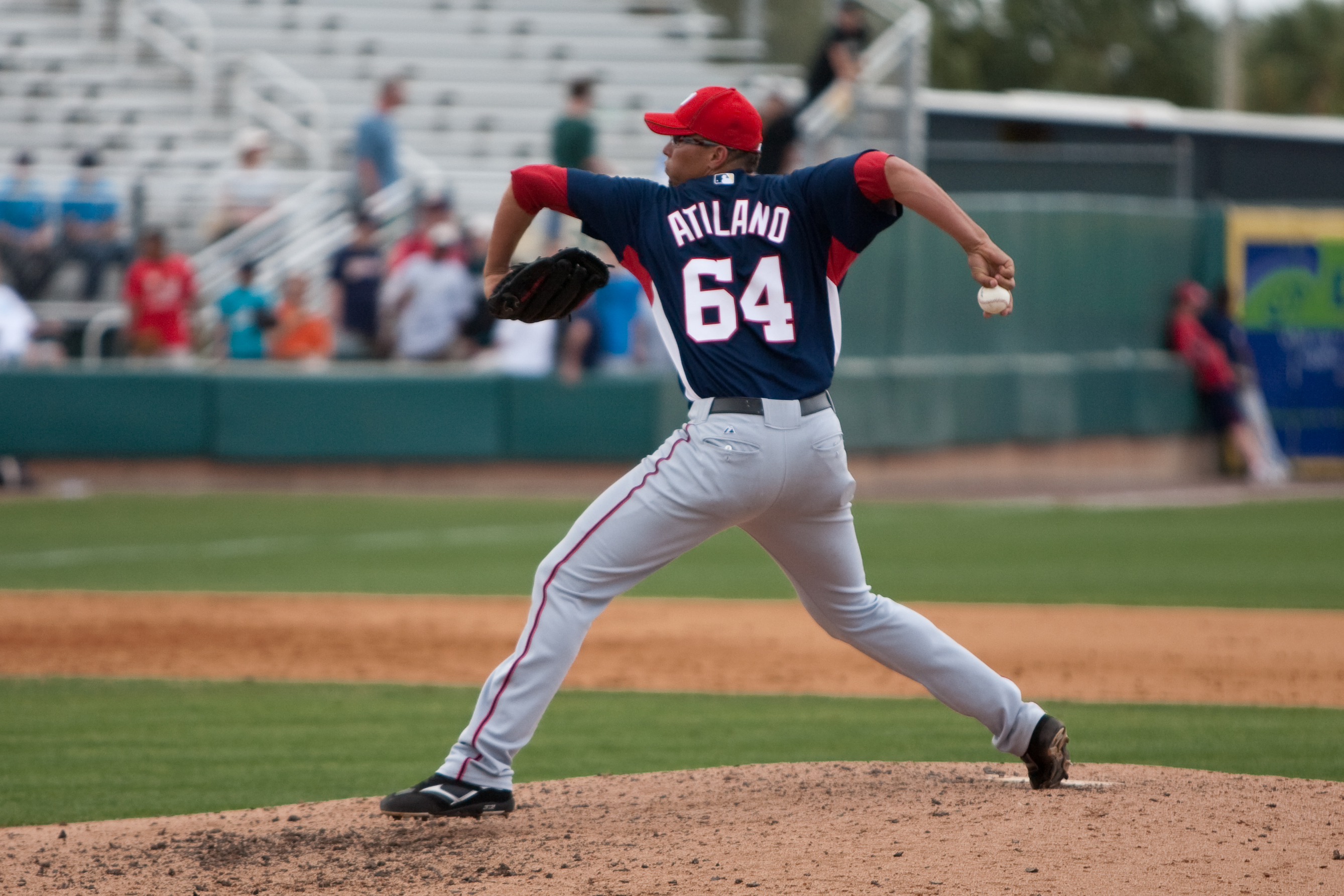
- Atilano with the Washington Nationals
- Pitcher
- Born: May 10, 1985 (age 40); Santurce, Puerto Rico
- Batted: Right Threw: Right

MLB debut
- April 23, 2010, for the Washington Nationals

Last MLB appearance
- July 20, 2010, for the Washington Nationals

MLB statistics
- Win–loss record: 6–7
- Earned run average: 5.15
- Strikeouts: 40
- Stats at Baseball Reference

Teams
- Washington Nationals (2010)

Luis A. Atilano (born May 10, 1985) is a Puerto Rican former professional baseball pitcher. He played in Major League Baseball (MLB) for the Washington Nationals.

== Career ==
=== Atlanta Braves ===
Atilano was drafted by the Atlanta Braves in the first round, with the 35th overall selection of the 2003 Major League Baseball draft. He made his professional debut with the rookie-level Gulf Coast League Braves, posting a 3.83 ERA over 12 starts. Atilano spent the 2004 campaign with the rookie-level Danville Braves, posting a 5-1 record and 4.20 ERA with 54 strikeouts across 13 starts.

Atilano made 24 starts for the Single-A Rome Braves in 2005, registering an 8-9 record and 4.17 ERA with 66 strikeouts over 136 innings. He made 19 appearances (18 starts) for the High-A Myrtle Beach Pelicans in 2006, compiling a 6-7 record and 4.50 ERA with 45 strikeouts across 116 innings pitched. An elbow injury suffered in early August ended Atilano's season prematurely.

=== Washington Nationals ===
On August 31, 2006, Atilano was traded to the Washington Nationals in exchange for Daryle Ward.

Atilano was recalled from Triple-A Syracuse, by the Nationals, to replace injured Jason Marquis on April 22, 2010. He allowed one run on five hits in a 5–1 Nationals victory against the Los Angeles Dodgers the next day, his first major league start and first major league win. Atilano started off the season well, going 5–1 in his first six decisions—which included consecutive victories over Tim Lincecum and Roy Oswalt. But then, he fell to 6–7 with a 5.15 ERA, and underwent surgery in July to remove bone chips in his elbow.

On February 16, 2011, Atilano was designated for assignment and removed from the 40-man roster. He cleared waivers and was sent outright to the Triple-A Syracuse Chiefs on February 20. In 2 starts for the Double-A Harrisburg Senators, he struggled to an 0-1 record and 13.50 ERA with 3 strikeouts over 6 innings of work. Atilano elected free agency on November 2.

=== Cincinnati Reds ===
On December 9, 2011, Atilano signed a minor league contract with the Cincinnati Reds. He made 2 appearances for the Double-A Pensacola Blue Wahoos and Triple-A Louisville Bats, struggling to an 0-2 record and 8.44 ERA with 3 strikeouts across 5 1/3 innings pitched. Atilano was released by the Reds organization on August 15, 2012.

On February 10, 2014, Atilano signed with the Lancaster Barnstormers of the Atlantic League of Professional Baseball, but never appeared for the team.

== See also ==
- List of Major League Baseball players from Puerto Rico
