= 2010 Minnesota Twins season =

2010 Minnesota Twins
- American League Central champions
- League: American League
- Division: Central
- Ballpark: Target Field
- City: Minneapolis, Minnesota
- Record: 94–68 (.580)
- Divisional place: 1st
- Owners: Jim Pohlad
- General managers: Bill Smith
- Managers: Ron Gardenhire
- Television: Fox Sports North; WFTC (My 29) (Dick Bremer, Bert Blyleven)
- Radio: 1500 AM ESPN Radio Twin Cities (KSTP-AM) (John Gordon, Dan Gladden, Jack Morris, Kris Atteberry)
- Stats: ESPN.com; Baseball Reference

The 2010 Minnesota Twins season was the 50th season for the franchise in Minnesota, and the 110th overall in the American League.

It was their first season in their new stadium, Target Field, which made its regular-season debut on April 12 as the Twins defeated the Boston Red Sox 5–2. This marked the return of outdoor professional baseball to the state of Minnesota for the first time since the end of the 1981 season, the last played at Metropolitan Stadium. 3,223,640 fans attended Twins games, setting a new franchise record.

The Twins clinched their sixth American League Central championship in nine seasons on September 21 after a win against the Cleveland Indians and a Chicago White Sox loss. They were again swept by the New York Yankees in the ALDS to end the season.

== Offseason ==
=== New uniforms ===
The Twins altered their uniforms for the 2010 season. Their new home outfits as well as their alternate uniforms feature a redesigned primary wordmark that was shown for the first time as a sign was hoisted into place atop the scoreboard at Target Field in May 2009. The team's colors remained unchanged (Red, navy and white) but the nameplate that had been in use since the 1980s on the uniforms was eliminated. The new road uniforms discards the navy pinstripes for a gray uniform with a script "Minnesota" on the front in navy with red and white trim. The franchise also wore a 1961 throwback uniform as part of the team's 50th season on Opening Day and all Saturday dates. The team donned a special Inaugural Season patch for Target Field on all home uniforms, and a Golden Anniversary season patch on their road outfits.

=== Roster moves ===
Before spring training, the Twins parted ways with 2009 trade deadline acquisition Orlando Cabrera, who would go on to sign a free agent deal with the Cincinnati Reds. Also leaving the team was backup catcher Mike Redmond. With Cabrera leaving, there were questions about the Twins infield. General Manager Bill Smith addressed these questions by trading center fielder Carlos Gómez to the Milwaukee Brewers for shortstop J. J. Hardy, and signing free agent second baseman Orlando Hudson. Smith also added some power to the bench by acquiring free agent and former White Sox and Indians designated hitter Jim Thome. With regular closer Joe Nathan out for the season after elbow surgery, Gardenhire named Jon Rauch the closer to begin the season. Later, the Twins traded catcher Wilson Ramos and Joe Testa to the Washington Nationals to acquire Matt Capps to bolster the bullpen. Other pitching changes included the late additions of Brian Fuentes and Randy Flores.

On March 22, catcher Joe Mauer signed a contract extension for eight years. The $184 million contract, paying him $23 million each year, is the richest ever for the Twins, and the fourth largest in major league history.

== Regular season ==
Finally, the Twins win a stadium opener at home. They'd lost the Home Openers at Metropolitan Stadium (April 21, 1961) and the Hubert H. Humphrey Metrodome (April 6, 1982). At Target Field on April 12 this year, DH Jason Kubel drove in two runs and hit the stadium's first home run in a 5–2 win over Boston.

On April 28, third baseman Luke Hughes hit a home run in his first-ever major league at bat, joining four other Twins who've accomplished the feat: Rick Renick (1968), Dave McKay (1975), Gary Gaetti (1981) and Andre David (1984). They were joined by Eddie Rosario in 2015.

On July 3, new Twin Jim Thome homered in the first inning for his 574th career home run. With that four-bagger, he passed Twins legend Harmon Killebrew's 573 on the all-time career home run list.

July 13: At Angel Stadium of Anaheim, Joe Mauer and Justin Morneau represented the Twins at the All-Star Game. Mauer was the starting AL catcher and Morneau was not used as a reserve.

Kevin Slowey's win on September 12 was the club's 4,000th win, dating back to win no. 1 on April 11, 1961.

Ron Gardenhire was named American League Manager of the Year; he'd been the runner-up five times. Pitcher Francisco Liriano, who'd missed all of 2007 following Tommy John surgery, saw limited action in 2008 and 2009 due to injuries. In 2010, he threw the second-most innings of any pitcher for the Twins, led the team in ERA, and allowed the fewest home runs per nine innings of any pitcher in the AL (0.4). He was voted the American League's Comeback Player of the Year. (He'll win it a second time, as a 2013 Pittsburgh Pirate He's the first player to win it twice and the only one to win it in both leagues.)

Joe Mauer won his fourth Silver Slugger Award and his third Gold Glove Award.

=== Season standings ===
==== American League Central ====
AL Central
| Team | W | L | Pct. | GB | Home | Road |
|---|---|---|---|---|---|---|
| Minnesota Twins | 94 | 68 | .580 | — | 53‍–‍28 | 41‍–‍40 |
| Chicago White Sox | 88 | 74 | .543 | 6 | 45‍–‍36 | 43‍–‍38 |
| Detroit Tigers | 81 | 81 | .500 | 13 | 52‍–‍29 | 29‍–‍52 |
| Cleveland Indians | 69 | 93 | .426 | 25 | 38‍–‍43 | 31‍–‍50 |
| Kansas City Royals | 67 | 95 | .414 | 27 | 38‍–‍43 | 29‍–‍52 |

==== American League Wild Card ====
Division winners
| Team | W | L | Pct. |
|---|---|---|---|
| Tampa Bay Rays | 96 | 66 | .593 |
| Minnesota Twins | 94 | 68 | .580 |
| Texas Rangers | 90 | 72 | .556 |

Wild Card team (Top team qualifies for postseason)
| Team | W | L | Pct. | GB |
|---|---|---|---|---|
| New York Yankees | 95 | 67 | .586 | — |
| Boston Red Sox | 89 | 73 | .549 | 6 |
| Chicago White Sox | 88 | 74 | .543 | 7 |
| Toronto Blue Jays | 85 | 77 | .525 | 10 |
| Detroit Tigers | 81 | 81 | .500 | 14 |
| Oakland Athletics | 81 | 81 | .500 | 14 |
| Los Angeles Angels of Anaheim | 80 | 82 | .494 | 15 |
| Cleveland Indians | 69 | 93 | .426 | 26 |
| Kansas City Royals | 67 | 95 | .414 | 28 |
| Baltimore Orioles | 66 | 96 | .407 | 29 |
| Seattle Mariners | 61 | 101 | .377 | 34 |

==== Record vs. opponents ====
2010 American League record Source: MLB Standings Grid – 2010
| Team | BAL | BOS | CWS | CLE | DET | KC | LAA | MIN | NYY | OAK | SEA | TB | TEX | TOR | NL |
|---|---|---|---|---|---|---|---|---|---|---|---|---|---|---|---|
| Baltimore | – | 9–9 | 4–3 | 3–3 | 5–5 | 2–4 | 6–0 | 3–5 | 5–13 | 3–7 | 3–6 | 7–11 | 6–4 | 3–15 | 7–11 |
| Boston | 9–9 | – | 1–6 | 4–4 | 3–3 | 4–3 | 9–1 | 3–2 | 9–9 | 4–5 | 7–3 | 7–11 | 4–6 | 12–6 | 13–5 |
| Chicago | 3–4 | 6–1 | – | 9–9 | 8–10 | 10–8 | 7–2 | 5–13 | 2–4 | 4–5 | 9–1 | 3–4 | 4–5 | 3–5 | 15–3 |
| Cleveland | 3–3 | 4–4 | 9–9 | – | 9–9 | 10–8 | 5–4 | 6–12 | 2–6 | 3–6 | 3–4 | 2–7 | 2–4 | 6–4 | 5–13 |
| Detroit | 5–5 | 3–3 | 10–8 | 9–9 | – | 10–8 | 6–4 | 9–9 | 4–4 | 3–3 | 3–5 | 1–6 | 3–6 | 4–4 | 11–7 |
| Kansas City | 4–2 | 3-4 | 9–10 | 8–10 | 8–10 | – | 3-7 | 5–13 | 3–5 | 3–6 | 5–4 | 4–4 | 2–7 | 3–3 | 8–10 |
| Los Angeles | 0–6 | 1–9 | 2–7 | 4–5 | 4–6 | 7–3 | – | 2–5 | 4–4 | 11–8 | 15–4 | 4–5 | 9–10 | 6–3 | 11–7 |
| Minnesota | 5–3 | 2–3 | 13–5 | 12–6 | 9–9 | 13–5 | 5–2 | – | 2–4 | 6–3 | 6-4 | 3–5 | 7–3 | 3–6 | 8–10 |
| New York | 13–5 | 9–9 | 4–2 | 6-2 | 4–4 | 5–3 | 4–4 | 4–2 | – | 9–1 | 6–4 | 8–10 | 4–4 | 8–10 | 11–7 |
| Oakland | 7–3 | 5–4 | 5–4 | 6–3 | 3–3 | 6–3 | 8–11 | 3–6 | 1–9 | – | 13–6 | 4–5 | 9–10 | 3–4 | 8–10 |
| Seattle | 6–3 | 3–7 | 1–9 | 4–3 | 5–3 | 4–5 | 4–15 | 4–6 | 4–6 | 6–13 | – | 2–7 | 7–12 | 2–3 | 9–9 |
| Tampa Bay | 11–7 | 11–7 | 4–3 | 7–2 | 6–1 | 4–4 | 5–4 | 5–3 | 10–8 | 5–4 | 7–2 | – | 4–2 | 10–8 | 7–11 |
| Texas | 4–6 | 6–4 | 5–4 | 4–2 | 6–3 | 7–2 | 10-9 | 3-7 | 4-4 | 10-9 | 12–7 | 2–4 | – | 3–7 | 14–4 |
| Toronto | 15–3 | 6–12 | 5–3 | 4–6 | 4–4 | 3–3 | 3–6 | 6–3 | 10–8 | 4–3 | 3–2 | 8–10 | 7–3 | – | 7–11 |

- Source: MLB Standings Grid – 2010

=== Detailed record ===
| Team | Home | Away | Total |
|---|---|---|---|
AL East
| Baltimore Orioles | 2–2 | 3–1 | 5–3 |
| Boston Red Sox | 2–1 | 0–2 | 2–3 |
| New York Yankees | 1–2 | 1–2 | 2–4 |
| Tampa Bay Rays | 1–3 | 2–2 | 3–5 |
| Toronto Blue Jays | 1–3 | 2–3 | 3–6 |
| | 7–10 | 8–10 | 15–21 |
AL Central
| Chicago White Sox | 6–3 | 7–2 | 13–5 |
| Cleveland Indians | 6–3 | 6–3 | 12–6 |
| Detroit Tigers | 7–2 | 2–7 | 9–9 |
| Kansas City Royals | 7–2 | 6–3 | 13–5 |
| | 26–10 | 21–15 | 47–25 |
AL West
| Los Angeles Angels | 2–1 | 3–1 | 5–2 |
| Oakland Athletics | 4–2 | 2–1 | 6–3 |
| Seattle Mariners | 3–0 | 3–4 | 6–4 |
| Texas Rangers | 6–0 | 1–3 | 4–3 |
| | 15–3 | 9–9 | 25–12 |
National League
| Atlanta Braves | 1–2 | N/A | 1–2 |
| Colorado Rockies | 2–1 | N/A | 2–1 |
| Milwaukee Brewers | 2–1 | 0–3 | 2–4 |
| New York Mets | N/A | 1–2 | 1–2 |
| Philadelphia Phillies | N/A | 2–1 | 2–1 |
| | 5–4 | 3–6 | 8–10 |

| Month | Games | Won | Lost | Pct |
|---|---|---|---|---|
| April | 23 | 15 | 8 | .652 |
| May | 28 | 16 | 12 | .571 |
| June | 27 | 12 | 15 | .444 |
| July | 26 | 15 | 11 | .577 |
| August | 28 | 18 | 10 | .643 |
| September | 27 | 17 | 10 | .630 |
| October | 3 | 1 | 2 | .333 |
| | 162 | 94 | 68 | .580 |

=== Roster ===
2010 Minnesota Twins
Roster
| Pitchers: 30 Scott Baker; 53 Nick Blackburn; 31 Alex Burnett; 55 Matt Capps; 28 Jesse Crain; 56 Rob Delaney; 52 Brian Duensing; 44 Randy Flores; 61 Matt Fox; 51 Brian Fuentes; 54 Matt Guerrier; 47 Francisco Liriano; 32 Ron Mahay; 49 Jeff Manship; 50 José Mijares; 17 Pat Neshek; 48 Carl Pavano; 15 Glen Perkins; 60 Jon Rauch; 39 Anthony Slama; 59 Kevin Slowey | Catchers: 41 Drew Butera; 7 Joe Mauer; 26 José Morales; 44 Wilson Ramos; Infielders: 12 Alexi Casilla; 5 Michael Cuddyer; 27 J. J. Hardy; 23 Brendan Harris; 1 Orlando Hudson; 38 Luke Hughes; 33 Justin Morneau; 24 Trevor Plouffe; 8 Nick Punto; 20 Matt Tolbert; 19 Danny Valencia; Outfielders: 16 Jason Kubel; 18 Jason Repko; 37 Ben Revere; 2 Denard Span; 21 Delmon Young; Designated Hitter: 25 Jim Thome | Manager: 35 Ron Gardenhire; Coaches: 40 Rick Anderson (pitching); 75 Nate Dammann (coach); 9 Steve Liddle (bench); 43 Rick Stelmaszek (bullpen); 45 Scott Ullger (third base); 46 Joe Vavra (hitting); 13 Jerry White (first base) |

== Game log ==
2010 Game Log
April (15–8)

| # | Date | Opponent | Score | Win | Loss | Save | Attendance | Record |
|---|---|---|---|---|---|---|---|---|
| 1 | April 5 | @ Angels | 6–3 | Weaver (1–0) | Baker (0–1) | Fuentes (1) | 43,504 | 0–1 |
| 2 | April 6 | @ Angels | 5–3 | Blackburn (1–0) | Saunders (0–1) | Rauch (1) | 43,510 | 1–1 |
| 3 | April 7 | @ Angels | 4–2 | Pavano (1–0) | Santana (0–1) | Rauch (2) | 41,533 | 2–1 |
| 4 | April 8 | @ Angels | 10–1 | Slowey (1–0) | Piñeiro (0–1) | | 39,709 | 3–1 |
| 5 | April 9 | @ White Sox | 4–3 (11) | Duensing (1–0) | Peña (0–1) | Rauch (3) | 21,416 | 4–1 |
| 6 | April 10 | @ White Sox | 2–1 | Baker (1–1) | García (0–1) | Rauch (4) | 28,337 | 5–1 |
| 7 | April 11 | @ White Sox | 5–4 | Buehrle (2–0) | Blackburn (1–1) | Jenks (1) | 25,550 | 5–2 |
| 8 | April 12 | Red Sox | 5–2 | Pavano (2–0) | Lester (0–1) | Rauch (5) | 38,145 | 6–2 |
| 9 | April 14 | Red Sox | 6–3 | Lackey (1–0) | Slowey (1–1) | Papelbon (3) | 38,164 | 6–3 |
| 10 | April 15 | Red Sox | 8–0 | Liriano (1–0) | Wakefield (0–1) | | 38,341 | 7–3 |
| 11 | April 16 | Royals | 10–3 | Baker (2–1) | Greinke (0–2) | | 38,532 | 8–3 |
| 12 | April 17 | Royals | 6–5 | Duensing (2–0) | Parrish (1–1) | Rauch (6) | 38,564 | 9–3 |
| 13 | April 18 | Royals | 10–5 | Hochevar (2–0) | Pavano (2–1) | Soria (3) | 38,544 | 9–4 |
| 14 | April 20 | Indians | 5–1 | Slowey (2–1) | Masterson (0–2) | | 38,985 | 10–4 |
| 15 | April 21 | Indians | 6–0 | Liriano (2–0) | Huff (1–2) | | 39,044 | 11–4 |
| 16 | April 22 | Indians | 8–1 | Talbot (2–1) | Baker (2–2) | | 38,810 | 11–5 |
| 17 | April 23 | @ Royals | 8–3 | Pavano (3–1) | Meche (0–2) | | 16,605 | 12–5 |
| 18 | April 24 | @ Royals | 9–7 (12) | Rauch (1–0) | Tejeda (1–2) | | 26,649 | 13–5 |
| 19 | April 25 | @ Royals | 4–3 | Bannister (1–1) | Slowey (2–2) | Soria (5) | 15,601 | 13–6 |
| 20 | April 27 | @ Tigers | 2–0 | Liriano (3–0) | Verlander (1–2) | Rauch (7) | 22,008 | 14–6 |
| 21 | April 28 | @ Tigers | 11–6 | Thomas (1–0) | Mahay (0–1) | | 19,900 | 14–7 |
| 22 | April 29 | @ Tigers | 3–0 | Willis (1–1) | Pavano (3–2) | Valverde (7) | 25,595 | 14–8 |
| 23 | April 30 | @ Indians | 9–3 | Slowey (3–2) | Carmona (3–1) | | 14,124 | 15–8 |

May (16–12)

| # | Date | Opponent | Score | Win | Loss | Save | Attendance | Record |
|---|---|---|---|---|---|---|---|---|
| 24 | May 1 | @ Indians | 5–4 (11) | Wright (1–1) | Burnett (0–1) | | 13,832 | 15–9 |
| 25 | May 2 | @ Indians | 8–3 | Liriano (4–0) | Huff (1–4) | | 12,619 | 16–9 |
| 26 | May 3 | Tigers | 10–4 | Baker (3–2) | Scherzer (1–2) | | 38,728 | 17–9 |
| 27 | May 4 | Tigers | 4–3 | Blackburn (2–1) | Perry (1–2) | | 39,020 | 18–9 |
| 28 | May 5 | Tigers | 5–4 | Slowey (4–2) | Porcello (2–3) | Rauch (8) | 39,037 | 19–9 |
| 29 | May 6 | Orioles | 2–0 | Bergesen (2–2) | Pavano (3–3) | Simón (3) | 38,489 | 19–10 |
| | May 7 | Orioles | Postponed (rain); rescheduled for May 8 | | | | | |
| 30 | May 8 | Orioles | 7–3 | Guthrie (1–4) | Liriano (4–1) | | 38,608 | 19–11 |
| 31 | May 8 | Orioles | 6–1 | Baker (4–2) | Millwood (0–4) | | 38,863 | 20–11 |
| 32 | May 9 | Orioles | 6–0 | Blackburn (3–1) | Matusz (2–3) | | 38,641 | 21–11 |
| 33 | May 11 | White Sox | 5–2 | García (2–2) | Slowey (4–3) | Jenks (6) | 38,764 | 21–12 |
| 34 | May 12 | White Sox | 3–2 | Pavano (4–3) | Danks (3–2) | Rauch (9) | 38,895 | 22–12 |
| 35 | May 14 | @ Yankees | 8–4 | Chamberlain (1–1) | Baker (4–3) | | 45,195 | 22–13 |
| 36 | May 15 | @ Yankees | 7–1 | Pettitte (5–0) | Liriano (4–2) | | 46,347 | 22–14 |
| 37 | May 16 | @ Yankees | 6–3 | Blackburn (4–1) | Chamberlain (1–2) | Rauch (10) | 46,628 | 23–14 |
| 38 | May 17 | @ Blue Jays | 8–3 | Slowey (5–3) | Eveland (3–3) | | 13,892 | 24–14 |
| 39 | May 18 | @ Blue Jays | 11–2 | Marcum (3–1) | Pavano (4–4) | | 27,981 | 24–15 |
| 40 | May 19 | @ Red Sox | 3–2 | Buchholz (5–3) | Baker (4–4) | Bard (1) | 37,426 | 24–16 |
| 41 | May 20 | @ Red Sox | 6–2 | Lester (4–2) | Liriano (4–3) | | 38,144 | 24–17 |
| 42 | May 21 | Brewers | 15–3 | Blackburn (5–1) | Bush (1–5) | | 38,737 | 25–17 |
| 43 | May 22 | Brewers | 8–7 (12) | Crain (1–0) | Parra (0–3) | | 39,152 | 26–17 |
| 44 | May 23 | Brewers | 4–3 | Parra (1–3) | Pavano (4–5) | Axford (1) | 38,952 | 26–18 |
| 45 | May 25 | Yankees | 1–0 | Burnett (5–2) | Duensing (2–1) | Rivera (9) | 38,962 | 26–19 |
| 46 | May 26 | Yankees | 3–2 | Pettitte (6–1) | Rauch (1–1) | Rivera (10) | 39,353 | 26–20 |
| 47 | May 27 | Yankees | 8–2 | Blackburn (6–1) | Vázquez (3–5) | | 39,087 | 27–20 |
| 48 | May 28 | Rangers | 2–1 | Slowey (6–3) | Lewis (4–3) | Rauch (11) | 39,581 | 28–20 |
| 49 | May 29 | Rangers | 8–3 | Pavano (5–5) | Wilson (3–3) | | 39,659 | 29–20 |
| 50 | May 30 | Rangers | 6–3 | Baker (5–4) | Holland (2–1) | Rauch (12) | 39,873 | 30–20 |
| 51 | May 31 | @ Mariners | 5–4 | Liriano (5–3) | Fister (3–3) | Rauch (13) | 19,795 | 31–20 |

June (12–15)

| # | Date | Opponent | Score | Win | Loss | Save | Attendance | Record |
|---|---|---|---|---|---|---|---|---|
| 52 | June 1 | @ Mariners | 7–1 | Vargas (4–2) | Blackburn (6–2) | | 18,740 | 31–21 |
| 53 | June 2 | @ Mariners | 2–1 (10) | League (5–5) | Guerrier (0–1) | | 20,414 | 31–22 |
| 54 | June 3 | @ Mariners | 4–1 | Hernández (3–4) | Pavano (5–6) | Aardsma (12) | 21,291 | 31–23 |
| 55 | June 4 | @ Athletics | 5–4 | Guerrier (1–1) | Bailey (0–2) | Rauch (14) | 21,703 | 32–23 |
| 56 | June 5 | @ Athletics | 4–3 | Burnett (1–1) | Ziegler (2–3) | Rauch (15) | 16,421 | 33–23 |
| 57 | June 6 | @ Athletics | 5–4 | Gonzalez (6–3) | Blackburn (6–3) | Wuertz (1) | 20,059 | 33–24 |
| 58 | June 8 | Royals | 7–3 | Slowey (7–3) | Greinke (1–8) | Guerrier (1) | 38,970 | 34–24 |
| 59 | June 9 | Royals | 6–2 | Pavano (6–6) | Davies (4–5) | | 40,323 | 35–24 |
| 60 | June 10 | Royals | 9–8 | Chen (3–0) | Baker (5–5) | Soria (14) | 39,022 | 35–25 |
| 61 | June 11 | Braves | 2–1 | Liriano (6–3) | Hudson (6–2) | Rauch (16) | 39,428 | 36–25 |
| 62 | June 12 | Braves | 3–2 | Venters (2–0) | Guerrier (1–2) | Wagner (11) | 40,001 | 36–26 |
| 63 | June 13 | Braves | 7–3 | Medlen (4–1) | Slowey (7–4) | | 39,772 | 36–27 |
| 64 | June 15 | Rockies | 9–3 | Pavano (7–6) | Cook (2–4) | | 39,812 | 37–27 |
| 65 | June 16 | Rockies | 2–1 | Baker (6–5) | Chacín (3–6) | Rauch (17) | 40,814 | 38–27 |
| 66 | June 17 | Rockies | 5–1 | Jiménez (13–1) | Liriano (6–4) | | 40,741 | 38–28 |
| 67 | June 18 | @ Phillies | 9–5 | Blanton (2–5) | Blackburn (6–4) | | 45,120 | 38–29 |
| 68 | June 19 | @ Phillies | 13–10 (11) | Rauch (2–0) | Báez (2–3) | | 45,254 | 39–29 |
| 69 | June 20 | @ Phillies | 4–1 | Pavano (8–6) | Halladay (8–6) | | 45,202 | 40–29 |
| 70 | June 22 | @ Brewers | 7–5 | Narveson (6–4) | Baker (6–6) | Axford (5) | 36,995 | 40–30 |
| 71 | June 23 | @ Brewers | 5–3 | Parra (2–5) | Liriano (6–5) | Axford (6) | 33,362 | 40–31 |
| 72 | June 24 | @ Brewers | 5–0 | Gallardo (7–3) | Blackburn (6–5) | | 35,898 | 40–32 |
| 73 | June 25 | @ Mets | 5–2 | Pelfrey (10–2) | Slowey (7–5) | Rodríguez (17) | 36,244 | 40–33 |
| 74 | June 26 | @ Mets | 6–0 | Pavano (9–6) | Santana (5–5) | | 37,510 | 41–33 |
| 75 | June 27 | @ Mets | 6–0 | Niese (5–2) | Baker (6–7) | | 37,644 | 41–34 |
| 76 | June 28 | Tigers | 7–5 | Bonderman (4–5) | Liriano (6–6) | | 40,681 | 41–35 |
| 77 | June 29 | Tigers | 11–4 | Blackburn (7–5) | Galarraga (3–2) | | 40,593 | 42–35 |
| 78 | June 30 | Tigers | 5–1 | Slowey (8–5) | Oliver (0–2) | | 40,671 | 43–35 |

July (15–11)

| # | Date | Opponent | Score | Win | Loss | Save | Attendance | Record |
|---|---|---|---|---|---|---|---|---|
| 79 | July 1 | Rays | 5–4 (10) | Cormier (3–1) | Guerrier (1–3) | Soriano (19) | 40,665 | 43–36 |
| 80 | July 2 | Rays | 2–1 | Baker (7–7) | Price (11–4) | Rauch (18) | 39,266 | 44–36 |
| 81 | July 3 | Rays | 8–6 | Choate (1–2) | Guerrier (1–4) | Soriano (20) | 40,852 | 44–37 |
| 82 | July 4 | Rays | 7–4 | Shields (7–8) | Blackburn (7–6) | Soriano (21) | 40,328 | 44–38 |
| 83 | July 6 | @ Blue Jays | 7–6 | Mijares (1–0) | Frasor (3–2) | Rauch (19) | 15,072 | 45–38 |
| 84 | July 7 | @ Blue Jays | 6–5 | Downs (3–5) | Guerrier (1–5) | Gregg (19) | 14,886 | 45–39 |
| 85 | July 8 | @ Blue Jays | 8–1 | Cecil (8–5) | Baker (7–8) | | 15,601 | 45–40 |
| 86 | July 9 | @ Tigers | 7–3 | Verlander (11–5) | Liriano (6–7) | | 42,549 | 45–41 |
| 87 | July 10 | @ Tigers | 7–4 | Bonderman (5–6) | Blackburn (7–7) | Valverde (19) | 41,461 | 45–42 |
| 88 | July 11 | @ Tigers | 6–3 | Pavano (10–6) | Oliver (0–3) | Rauch (20) | 39,689 | 46–42 |
All-Star Break: National League defeats American League 3–1.
| 89 | July 15 | White Sox | 8–7 | Danks (9–7) | Burnett (1–2) | Jenks (20) | 40,697 | 46–43 |
| 90 | July 16 | White Sox | 7–4 | Liriano (7–7) | Floyd (5–8) | Crain (1) | 40,427 | 47–43 |
| 91 | July 17 | White Sox | 3–2 | Pavano (11–6) | Buehrle (8–8) | | 40,637 | 48–43 |
| 92 | July 18 | White Sox | 7–6 | Duensing (3–1) | Jenks (1–2) | | 40,336 | 49–43 |
| 93 | July 19 | Indians | 10–4 | Laffey (2–3) | Baker (7–9) | | 40,853 | 49–44 |
| 94 | July 20 | Indians | 4–3 | R. Perez (3–0) | Mijares (1–1) | C. Perez (9) | 40,745 | 49–45 |
| 95 | July 21 | Indians | 6–0 | Liriano (8–7) | Westbrook (6–6) | | 40,799 | 50–45 |
| 96 | July 22 | @ Orioles | 5–0 | Pavano (12–6) | Millwood (2–9) | | 20,108 | 51–45 |
| 97 | July 23 | @ Orioles | 3–2 | Guthrie (4–10) | Slama (0–1) | Simón (14) | 19,013 | 51–46 |
| 98 | July 24 | @ Orioles | 7–2 | Baker (8–9) | Matusz (3–11) | | 22,299 | 52–46 |
| 99 | July 25 | @ Orioles | 10–4 | Slowey (9–5) | Arrieta (3–3) | | 17,408 | 53–46 |
| 100 | July 26 | @ Royals | 19–1 | Liriano (9–7) | Greinke (6–10) | | 19,306 | 54–46 |
| 101 | July 27 | @ Royals | 11–2 | Pavano (13–6) | Chen (5–5) | | 16,749 | 55–46 |
| 102 | July 28 | @ Royals | 6–4 | Duensing (4–1) | Bannister (7–10) | Rauch (21) | 15,484 | 56–46 |
| 103 | July 30 | Mariners | 5–3 | Baker (9–9) | Fister (3–7) | Capps (1) | 40,596 | 57–46 |
| 104 | July 31 | Mariners | 4–0 | Slowey (10–5) | Hernández (7–8) | | 40,799 | 58–46 |

August (18–10)

| # | Date | Opponent | Score | Win | Loss | Save | Attendance | Record |
|---|---|---|---|---|---|---|---|---|
| 105 | August 1 | Mariners | 4–0 | Liriano (10–7) | French (0–2) | | 40,374 | 59–46 |
| 106 | August 2 | @ Rays | 4–2 | Hellickson (1–0) | Pavano (13–7) | Wheeler (3) | 17,689 | 59–47 |
| 107 | August 3 | @ Rays | 6–4 | Niemann (10–3) | Guerrier (1–6) | Soriano (31) | 18,261 | 59–48 |
| 108 | August 4 | @ Rays | 2–1 (13) | Guerrier (2–6) | Cormier (3–3) | | 19,172 | 60–48 |
| 109 | August 5 | @ Rays | 8–6 | Capps (1–0) | Benoit (0–1) | | 29,210 | 61–48 |
| 110 | August 6 | @ Indians | 7–6 | C. Perez (1–2) | Guerrier (2–7) | | 25,275 | 61–49 |
| 111 | August 7 | @ Indians | 7–2 | Pavano (14–7) | Carmona (11–9) | | 27,638 | 62–49 |
| 112 | August 8 | @ Indians | 5–4 | Duensing (5–1) | Huff (2–11) | Capps (2) | 17,427 | 63–49 |
| 113 | August 10 | @ White Sox | 12–6 | Baker (10–9) | García (10–5) | | 30,900 | 64–49 |
| 114 | August 11 | @ White Sox | 6–1 | Danks (12–8) | Perkins (0–1) | | 32,033 | 64–50 |
| 115 | August 12 | @ White Sox | 6–1 | Liriano (11–7) | Floyd (8–9) | | 33,237 | 65–50 |
| 116 | August 13 | Athletics | 4–3 | Pavano (15–7) | Gonzalez (10–8) | Capps (3) | 40,622 | 66–50 |
| 117 | August 14 | Athletics | 2–0 | Duensing (6–1) | Cahill (12–5) | | 40,830 | 67–50 |
| 118 | August 15 | Athletics | 4–2 | Slowey (11–5) | Mazzaro (6–5) | Capps (4) | 40,602 | 68–50 |
| 119 | August 17 | White Sox | 7–6 (10) | Mahay (1–1) | Thornton (3–4) | | 40,714 | 69–50 |
| 120 | August 18 | White Sox | 7–6 | Manship (1–0) | Floyd (8–10) | Capps (5) | 40,702 | 70–50 |
| 121 | August 19 | White Sox | 11–0 | Buehrle (12–9) | Pavano (15–8) | | 40,723 | 70–51 |
| 122 | August 20 | Angels | 7–1 | Duensing (7–1) | Haren (8–12) | | 40,747 | 71–51 |
| 123 | August 21 | Angels | 9–3 | Rodríguez (1–3) | Slowey (11–6) | | 40,966 | 71–52 |
| 124 | August 22 | Angels | 4–0 | Baker (11–9) | Weaver (11–9) | | 40,385 | 72–52 |
| 125 | August 23 | @ Rangers | 4–0 | Harden (5–4) | Blackburn (7–8) | | 22,757 | 72–53 |
| 126 | August 24 | @ Rangers | 4–3 | Oliver (1–1) | Pavano (15–9) | Feliz (32) | 20,107 | 72–54 |
| 127 | August 25 | @ Rangers | 4–3 | Wilson (13–5) | Duensing (7–2) | Harrison (2) | 29,926 | 72–55 |
| 128 | August 26 | @ Rangers | 6–4 | Liriano (12–7) | Lee (10–8) | Capps (6) | 24,738 | 73–55 |
| 129 | August 27 | @ Mariners | 6–3 | Baker (12–9) | Vargas (9–7) | | 37,798 | 74–55 |
| 130 | August 28 | @ Mariners | 1–0 | Blackburn (8–8) | Fister (4–10) | Fuentes (24) | 29,892 | 75–55 |
| 131 | August 29 | @ Mariners | 2–1 | French (3–4) | Pavano (15–10) | Aardsma (25) | 28,923 | 75–56 |
| 132 | August 31 | Tigers | 4–3 | Guerrier (3–7) | Coke (7–4) | Capps (7) | 40,186 | 76–56 |

September (17–10)

| # | Date | Opponent | Score | Win | Loss | Save | Attendance | Record |
|---|---|---|---|---|---|---|---|---|
| 133 | September 1 | Tigers | 2–1 (10) | Rauch (3–1) | Perry (2–5) | | 39,438 | 77–56 |
| 134 | September 2 | Tigers | 10–9 (13) | Valverde (2–3) | Blackburn (8–9) | | 39,551 | 77–57 |
| 135 | September 3 | Rangers | 4–3 | Burnett (2–2) | Holland (2–3) | Capps (8) | 40,134 | 78–57 |
| 136 | September 4 | Rangers | 12–4 | Pavano (16–10) | Lewis (9–12) | | 40,496 | 79–57 |
| 137 | September 5 | Rangers | 6–5 | Blackburn (9–9) | Wilson (14–6) | Capps (9) | 40,516 | 80–57 |
| 138 | September 6 | Royals | 5–4 | Manship (2–0) | O'Sullivan (2–5) | Capps (10) | 40,228 | 81–57 |
| 139 | September 7 | Royals | 10–3 | Liriano (13–7) | Bannister (7–12) | | 38,816 | 82–57 |
| 140 | September 8 | Royals | 4–3 | Duensing (8–2) | Greinke (8–12) | Capps (11) | 39,376 | 83–57 |
| 141 | September 10 | @ Indians | 2–0 | Carmona (12–14) | Pavano (16–11) | | 26,207 | 83–58 |
| 142 | September 11 | @ Indians | 1–0 (12) | Guerrier (4–7) | Germano (0–2) | Capps (12) | 24,972 | 84–58 |
| 143 | September 12 | @ Indians | 6–3 | Slowey (12–6) | Talbot (9–12) | | 22,988 | 85–58 |
| 144 | September 14 | @ White Sox | 9–3 | Liriano (14–7) | Danks (13–11) | | 29,223 | 86–58 |
| 145 | September 15 | @ White Sox | 9–3 | Duensing (9–2) | Floyd (10–13) | | 30,063 | 87–58 |
| 146 | September 16 | @ White Sox | 8–5 | Pavano (17–11) | Buehrle (12–11) | Capps (13) | 27,180 | 88–58 |
| 147 | September 17 | Athletics | 3–1 | Anderson (6–6) | Blackburn (9–10) | Bailey (25) | 40,681 | 88–59 |
| 148 | September 18 | Athletics | 4–2 | Slowey (13–6) | Braden (9–13) | Capps (14) | 40,847 | 89–59 |
| 149 | September 19 | Athletics | 6–2 | Cramer (2–0) | Liriano (14–8) | | 40,088 | 89–60 |
| 150 | September 20 | Indians | 9–3 | Duensing (10–2) | Gómez (3–5) | | 39,228 | 90–60 |
| 151 | September 21 | Indians | 6–4 | Perkins (1–1) | Masterson (6–13) | Capps (15) | 39,580 | 91–60 |
| 152 | September 22 | Indians | 5–1 | Blackburn (10–10) | Carrasco (1–1) | | 40,139 | 92–60 |
| 153 | September 24 | @ Tigers | 10–1 | Verlander (18–8) | Liriano (14–9) | | 30,083 | 92–61 |
| 154 | September 25 | @ Tigers | 11–10 (13) | Schlereth (1–0) | Neshek (0–1) | | 34,129 | 92–62 |
| 155 | September 26 | @ Tigers | 5–1 | Porcello (10–11) | Duensing (10–3) | | 32,021 | 92–63 |
| 156 | September 27 | @ Royals | 10–8 | Humber (2–1) | Manship (2–1) | Soria (42) | 19,307 | 92–64 |
| 157 | September 28 | @ Royals | 10–1 | O'Sullivan (4–6) | Blackburn (10–11) | | 18,487 | 92–65 |
| 158 | September 29 | @ Royals | 4–2 | Guerrier (5–7) | Meche (0–5) | Capps (16) | 18,340 | 93–65 |
| 159 | September 30 | Blue Jays | 13–2 | Janssen (5–2) | Liriano (14–10) | | 39,477 | 93–66 |

October (1–2)

| # | Date | Opponent | Score | Win | Loss | Save | Attendance | Record |
|---|---|---|---|---|---|---|---|---|
| 160 | October 1 | Blue Jays | 6–3 | Romero (14–9) | Crain (1–1) | Gregg (37) | 39,937 | 93–67 |
| 161 | October 2 | Blue Jays | 5–4 | Capps (2–0) | Gregg (2–6) | | 40,235 | 94–67 |
| 162 | October 3 | Blue Jays | 2–1 | Rzepczynski (4–4) | Blackburn (10–12) | Camp (2) | 40,664 | 94–68 |

American League Divisional Series

| # | Date | Opponent | Score | Win | Loss | Save | Attendance | Record |
|---|---|---|---|---|---|---|---|---|
| 1 | October 6 | Yankees | 6–4 | Sabathia (1–0) | Crain (0–1) | Rivera (1) | 42,032 | 0–1 |
| 2 | October 7 | Yankees | 5–2 | Pettitte (1–0) | Pavano (0–1) | Rivera (2) | 42,035 | 0–2 |
| 3 | October 9 | @ Yankees | 6–1 | Hughes (1–0) | Duensing (0–1) | | 50,840 | 0–3 |

== Player stats ==
=== Batting ===
Note: G = Games played; AB = At bats; R = Runs scored; H = Hits; 2B = Doubles; 3B = Triples; HR = Home runs; RBI = Runs batted in; AVG = Batting average; SB = Stolen bases

| Player | G | AB | R | H | 2B | 3B | HR | RBI | AVG | SB |
|---|---|---|---|---|---|---|---|---|---|---|
| Scott Baker | 2 | 3 | 0 | 0 | 0 | 0 | 0 | 0 | .000 | 0 |
| Nick Blackburn | 2 | 1 | 0 | 0 | 0 | 0 | 0 | 0 | .000 | 0 |
| Alex Burnett | 4 | 0 | 0 | 0 | 0 | 0 | 0 | 0 | — | 0 |
| Drew Butera | 49 | 142 | 12 | 28 | 6 | 1 | 2 | 13 | .197 | 0 |
| Alexi Casilla | 69 | 152 | 26 | 42 | 7 | 4 | 1 | 20 | .276 | 6 |
| Jesse Crain | 5 | 1 | 0 | 0 | 0 | 0 | 0 | 0 | .000 | 0 |
| Michael Cuddyer | 157 | 609 | 93 | 165 | 37 | 5 | 14 | 81 | .271 | 7 |
| Brian Duensing | 5 | 1 | 0 | 0 | 0 | 0 | 0 | 0 | .000 | 0 |
| Matt Guerrier | 4 | 0 | 0 | 0 | 0 | 0 | 0 | 0 | — | 0 |
| J.J. Hardy | 101 | 340 | 44 | 91 | 19 | 3 | 6 | 38 | .268 | 1 |
| Brendan Harris | 43 | 108 | 11 | 17 | 3 | 0 | 1 | 4 | .157 | 0 |
| Orlando Hudson | 126 | 497 | 80 | 133 | 24 | 5 | 6 | 37 | .268 | 10 |
| Luke Hughes | 2 | 7 | 1 | 2 | 0 | 0 | 1 | 1 | .286 | 0 |
| Jason Kubel | 143 | 518 | 68 | 129 | 23 | 3 | 21 | 92 | .249 | 0 |
| Francisco Liriano | 1 | 2 | 0 | 0 | 0 | 0 | 0 | 0 | .000 | 0 |
| Ron Mahay | 5 | 0 | 0 | 0 | 0 | 0 | 0 | 0 | — | 0 |
| Jeff Manship | 2 | 1 | 0 | 0 | 0 | 0 | 0 | 0 | .000 | 0 |
| Joe Mauer | 137 | 510 | 88 | 167 | 43 | 1 | 9 | 75 | .327 | 1 |
| José Mijares | 1 | 0 | 0 | 0 | 0 | 0 | 0 | 0 | — | 0 |
| José Morales | 19 | 36 | 4 | 7 | 2 | 0 | 0 | 7 | .194 | 0 |
| Justin Morneau | 81 | 296 | 53 | 102 | 25 | 1 | 18 | 56 | .345 | 0 |
| Carl Pavano | 2 | 6 | 0 | 3 | 0 | 0 | 0 | 0 | .500 | 0 |
| Trevor Plouffe | 22 | 41 | 7 | 6 | 1 | 0 | 2 | 6 | .146 | 0 |
| Nick Punto | 88 | 252 | 24 | 60 | 11 | 1 | 1 | 20 | .238 | 6 |
| Wilson Ramos | 7 | 27 | 2 | 8 | 3 | 0 | 0 | 1 | .296 | 0 |
| Jon Rauch | 2 | 0 | 0 | 0 | 0 | 0 | 0 | 0 | — | 0 |
| Jason Repko | 58 | 127 | 19 | 29 | 6 | 0 | 3 | 9 | .228 | 3 |
| Ben Revere | 13 | 28 | 1 | 5 | 0 | 0 | 0 | 2 | .179 | 0 |
| Kevin Slowey | 3 | 2 | 0 | 0 | 0 | 0 | 0 | 0 | .000 | 0 |
| Denard Span | 153 | 629 | 85 | 166 | 24 | 10 | 3 | 58 | .264 | 26 |
| Jim Thome | 108 | 276 | 48 | 76 | 16 | 2 | 25 | 59 | .283 | 0 |
| Matt Tolbert | 48 | 87 | 8 | 20 | 4 | 3 | 1 | 18 | .230 | 1 |
| Danny Valencia | 85 | 299 | 30 | 93 | 18 | 1 | 7 | 40 | .311 | 2 |
| Delmon Young | 153 | 570 | 77 | 170 | 46 | 1 | 21 | 112 | .298 | 5 |
| Pitcher Totals | 162 | 17 | 0 | 3 | 0 | 0 | 0 | 0 | .176 | 0 |
| Team totals | 162 | 5568 | 781 | 1521 | 318 | 41 | 142 | 749 | .273 | 68 |

=== Pitching ===
Note: W = Wins; L = Losses; ERA = Earned run average; G = Games pitched; GS = Games started; SV = Saves; IP = Innings pitched; HR = Home runs allowed; ER = Earned runs allowed; BB = Walks allowed; K = Strikeouts

| Player | W | L | ERA | G | GS | SV | IP | HR | ER | BB | K |
|---|---|---|---|---|---|---|---|---|---|---|---|
| Scott Baker | 12 | 9 | 4.49 | 29 | 29 | 0 | 170.1 | 23 | 85 | 43 | 148 |
| Nick Blackburn | 10 | 12 | 5.42 | 28 | 26 | 0 | 161.0 | 25 | 97 | 40 | 68 |
| Alex Burnett | 2 | 2 | 5.29 | 41 | 0 | 0 | 47.2 | 6 | 28 | 23 | 37 |
| Matt Capps | 2 | 0 | 2.00 | 27 | 0 | 16 | 27.0 | 1 | 6 | 8 | 21 |
| Jesse Crain | 1 | 1 | 3.04 | 71 | 0 | 1 | 68.0 | 5 | 23 | 27 | 62 |
| Rob Delaney | 0 | 0 | 9.00 | 1 | 0 | 0 | 1.0 | 1 | 1 | 1 | 0 |
| Brian Duensing | 10 | 3 | 2.62 | 53 | 13 | 0 | 130.2 | 11 | 38 | 35 | 78 |
| Randy Flores | 0 | 0 | 4.91 | 11 | 0 | 0 | 3.2 | 2 | 2 | 2 | 2 |
| Matt Fox | 0 | 0 | 3.18 | 1 | 1 | 0 | 5.2 | 0 | 2 | 1 | 0 |
| Brian Fuentes | 0 | 0 | 0.00 | 9 | 0 | 1 | 9.2 | 0 | 0 | 2 | 8 |
| Matt Guerrier | 5 | 7 | 3.17 | 74 | 0 | 1 | 71.0 | 7 | 25 | 22 | 42 |
| Francisco Liriano | 14 | 10 | 3.62 | 31 | 31 | 0 | 191.2 | 9 | 77 | 58 | 201 |
| Ron Mahay | 1 | 1 | 3.44 | 41 | 0 | 0 | 34.0 | 5 | 13 | 8 | 25 |
| Jeff Manship | 2 | 1 | 5.28 | 13 | 1 | 0 | 29.0 | 3 | 17 | 6 | 21 |
| José Mijares | 1 | 1 | 3.31 | 47 | 0 | 0 | 32.2 | 4 | 12 | 9 | 28 |
| Pat Neshek | 0 | 1 | 5.00 | 11 | 0 | 0 | 9.0 | 1 | 5 | 8 | 9 |
| Carl Pavano | 17 | 11 | 3.75 | 32 | 32 | 0 | 221.0 | 24 | 92 | 37 | 117 |
| Glen Perkins | 1 | 1 | 5.82 | 13 | 1 | 0 | 21.2 | 3 | 14 | 5 | 14 |
| Jon Rauch | 3 | 1 | 3.12 | 59 | 0 | 21 | 57.2 | 3 | 20 | 14 | 46 |
| Anthony Slama | 0 | 1 | 7.71 | 5 | 0 | 0 | 4.2 | 1 | 4 | 5 | 5 |
| Kevin Slowey | 13 | 6 | 4.45 | 30 | 28 | 0 | 155.2 | 21 | 77 | 29 | 116 |
| Team totals | 94 | 68 | 3.95 | 162 | 162 | 40 | 1452.2 | 155 | 638 | 383 | 1048 |

Source:2010 Minnesota Twins at Baseball Reference

== Playoffs ==
The Twins were swept in three games by the New York Yankees in the Division Series.

=== Game 1, October 6 ===
8:30 p.m. (EDT) at Target Field in Minneapolis, Minnesota

| Team | 1 | 2 | 3 | 4 | 5 | 6 | 7 | 8 | 9 | R | H | E |
|---|---|---|---|---|---|---|---|---|---|---|---|---|
| New York | 0 | 0 | 0 | 0 | 0 | 4 | 2 | 0 | 0 | 6 | 9 | 0 |
| Minnesota | 0 | 2 | 1 | 0 | 0 | 1 | 0 | 0 | 0 | 4 | 8 | 0 |
Starting pitchers: NYY: CC Sabathia (0–0); MIN: Francisco Liriano (0–0) --> WP: CC Sabathia (1–0) LP: Jesse Crain (0–1) Sv: Mariano Rivera (1); Home runs: NYY: Mark Teixeira (1); MIN: Michael Cuddyer (1)

=== Game 2, October 7 ===
6:00 p.m. (EDT) at Target Field in Minneapolis, Minnesota

| Team | 1 | 2 | 3 | 4 | 5 | 6 | 7 | 8 | 9 | R | H | E |
|---|---|---|---|---|---|---|---|---|---|---|---|---|
| New York | 0 | 0 | 0 | 1 | 1 | 0 | 2 | 0 | 1 | 5 | 12 | 0 |
| Minnesota | 0 | 1 | 0 | 0 | 0 | 1 | 0 | 0 | 0 | 2 | 6 | 0 |
Starting pitchers: NYY: Andy Pettitte (0–0); MIN: Carl Pavano (0–0) --> WP: Andy Pettitte (1–0) LP: Carl Pavano (0–1) Sv: Mariano Rivera (2); Home runs: NYY: Lance Berkman (1); MIN: Orlando Hudson (1)

=== Game 3, October 9 ===
8:30 p.m. (EDT) at Yankee Stadium in the Bronx, New York

| Team | 1 | 2 | 3 | 4 | 5 | 6 | 7 | 8 | 9 | R | H | E |
|---|---|---|---|---|---|---|---|---|---|---|---|---|
| Minnesota | 0 | 0 | 0 | 0 | 0 | 0 | 0 | 1 | 0 | 1 | 7 | 1 |
| New York | 0 | 1 | 1 | 3 | 0 | 0 | 1 | 0 | X | 6 | 12 | 0 |
Starting pitchers: MIN: Brian Duensing (0–0); NYY: Phil Hughes (0–0) --> WP: Phil Hughes (1–0) LP: Brian Duensing (0–1); Home runs: MIN: None; NYY: Marcus Thames (1), Nick Swisher (1)

== Other post-season awards ==
- Calvin R. Griffith Award (Most Valuable Twin) – Joe Mauer
- Joseph W. Haynes Award (Twins Pitcher of the Year) – Carl Pavano
- Bill Boni Award (Twins Outstanding Rookie) – Danny Valencia
- Charles O. Johnson Award (Most Improved Twin) – Delmon Young
- Dick Siebert Award (Upper Midwest Player of the Year) – Joe Mauer
- Bob Allison Award (Leadership Award) – Michael Cuddyer
- Mike Augustin Award ("Media Good Guy" Award) – Michael Cuddyer
  - The above awards are voted on by the Twin Cities chapter of the BBWAA
- Carl R. Pohlad Award (Outstanding Community Service) – Jesse Crain
- Sherry Robertson Award (Twins Outstanding Farm System Position Player) – Joe Benson
- Jim Rantz Award (Twins Outstanding Farm System Pitcher) – Kyle Gibson
- Kirby Puckett Award (Alumni Community Service) – Bert Blyleven
- Herb Carneal Award (Lifetime Achievement Award) – Bert Blyleven

== Farm system ==
| Level | Team | League | Manager |
|---|---|---|---|
| AAA | Rochester Red Wings | International League | Tom Nieto |
| AA | New Britain Rock Cats | Eastern League | Jeff Smith |
| A | Fort Myers Miracle | Florida State League | Jake Mauer |
| A | Beloit Snappers | Midwest League | Nelson Prada |
| Rookie | Elizabethton Twins | Appalachian League | Ray Smith |
| Rookie | GCL Twins | Gulf Coast League | Chris Heintz and Ramon Borrego |
