= 2010 Milwaukee Brewers season =

2010 Milwaukee Brewers
- League: National League
- Division: Central
- Ballpark: Miller Park
- City: Milwaukee, Wisconsin
- Record: 77–85 (.475)
- Divisional place: 3rd
- Owners: Mark Attanasio
- General managers: Doug Melvin
- Managers: Ken Macha
- Television: WMLW-CA; Fox Sports Wisconsin (Brian Anderson, Bill Schroeder, Craig Coshun)
- Radio: 620 WTMJ (Bob Uecker, Cory Provus, Dave Nelson)
- Stats: ESPN.com; Baseball Reference

The Milwaukee Brewers' 2010 season was the 41st season for the franchise in Milwaukee, the 13th in the National League, and 42nd overall.

== Regular season ==
=== April ===
The Brewers began the 2010 season with a loss at Miller Park to the Colorado Rockies in Yovani Gallardo's first career Opening Day start. The Brewers recovered to win the series, however, on the strength of two saves by Trevor Hoffman and a solid start from newcomer Randy Wolf. In the following series against the St. Louis Cardinals, Hoffman squandered two ninth-inning leads though he was bailed out the second time by third baseman Casey McGehee's walk-off home run to avoid being swept. The game was also noteworthy, because the Brewers overcame a home run by Albert Pujols. Although Pujols would hit 8 home runs against the Brewers in 2010, the Brewers would win 6 of those 7 contests. Milwaukee then lost series to the Chicago Cubs and the Washington Nationals. In the lone win of the Nationals series, the Brewers scored ten runs in the first inning, the franchise's first ten-run inning in nearly nine years.

The Brewers took that offensive firepower to Pittsburgh, where, in a three-game sweep, they outscored the Pirates 36–1, including a historic 20–0 drubbing in the finale. The 20-run margin tied a club record for margin of victory and was the most one-sided shutout win in Brewers history. The series run differential tied for the third largest all-time. The team could not keep up the record pace, though, and returned to Milwaukee to get swept by the Cubs, then to lose two of three against the Pirates, to whom the Brewers had not lost at Miller Park in the previous 22 Milwaukee meetings. Hoffman continued to struggle, blowing consecutive save opportunities in a 17-hour span as the Brewers hitters sputtered to end the month as well. The Brewers lost seven of their last eight games in April to finish the month with a 9–14 record.

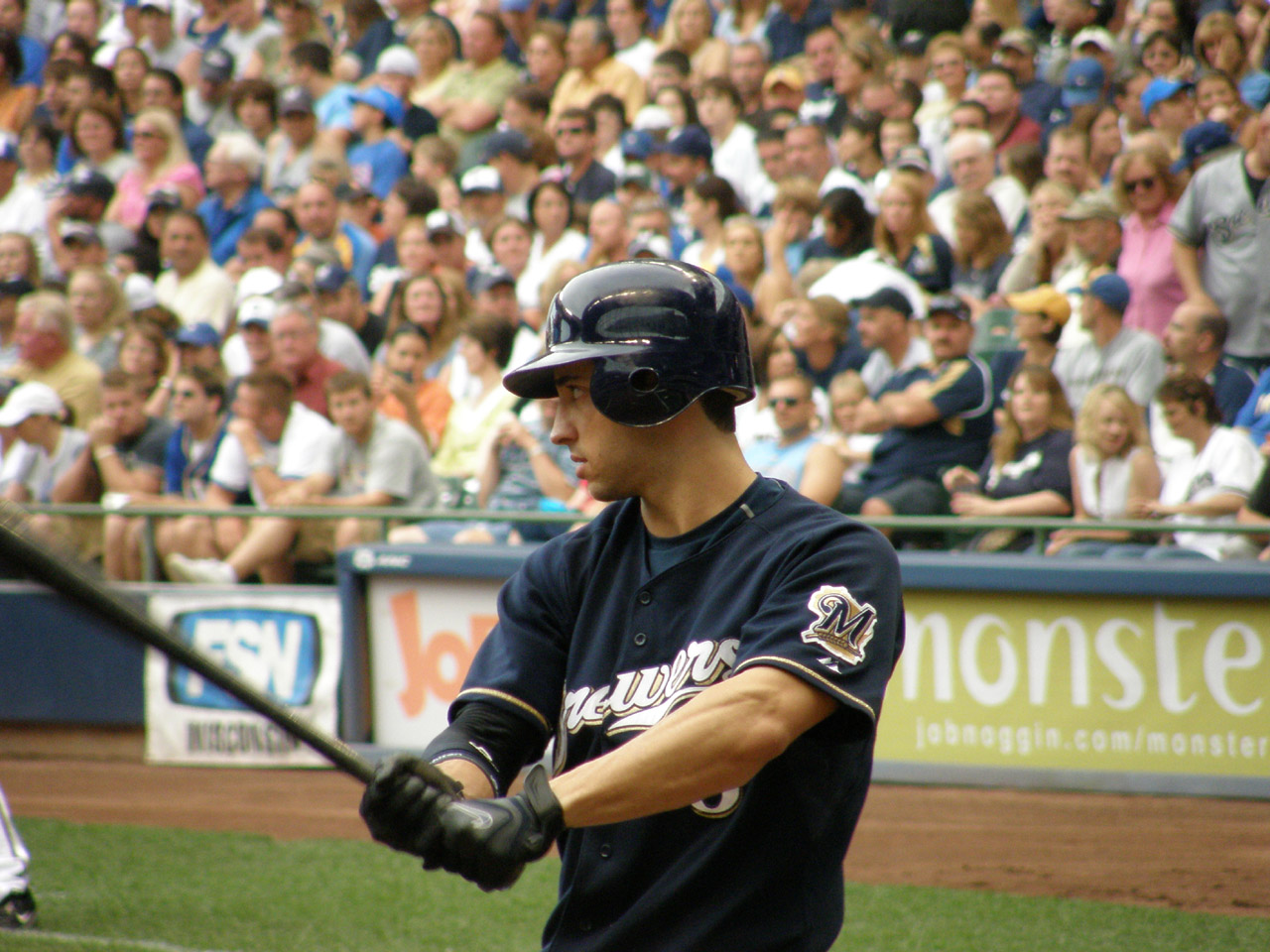
Ryan Braun

Left fielder Ryan Braun recorded a .355 batting average with five home runs and 20 RBIs and Casey McGehee hit .305 with five homers and 19 RBIs to lead the way for the Brewers' offense, while mighty first baseman Prince Fielder could only muster a .244 average and did not hit a home run until his 54th at bat, a career-long season-opening drought. Gallardo and Wolf each notched two wins in the season's opening month to set the pace for Milwaukee pitchers. Veteran Jeff Suppan, the Brewers' Opening Day starter in 2009, was removed from the rotation after two disappointing starts in favor of Chris Narveson.

=== May ===
The month of May was rocky for the Brewers when they rode a 9-game losing streak, the longest since 2006 when they lost 10 in a row.

=== Season standings ===
==== National League Central ====
NL Central
Team	W	L	Pct.	GB	Home	Road
Cincinnati Reds	91	71	.562	—	49‍–‍32	42‍–‍39
St. Louis Cardinals	86	76	.531	5	52‍–‍29	34‍–‍47
Milwaukee Brewers	77	85	.475	14	40‍–‍41	37‍–‍44
Houston Astros	76	86	.469	15	42‍–‍39	34‍–‍47
Chicago Cubs	75	87	.463	16	35‍–‍46	40‍–‍41
Pittsburgh Pirates	57	105	.352	34	40‍–‍41	17‍–‍64

==== National League Wild Card ====
Division leaders
Team	W	L	Pct.
Philadelphia Phillies	97	65	.599
San Francisco Giants	92	70	.568
Cincinnati Reds	91	71	.562

Wild Card team (Top team qualifies for postseason)
Team	W	L	Pct.	GB
Atlanta Braves	91	71	.562	—
San Diego Padres	90	72	.556	1
St. Louis Cardinals	86	76	.531	5
Colorado Rockies	83	79	.512	8
Florida Marlins	80	82	.494	11
Los Angeles Dodgers	80	82	.494	11
New York Mets	79	83	.488	12
Milwaukee Brewers	77	85	.475	14
Houston Astros	76	86	.469	15
Chicago Cubs	75	87	.463	16
Washington Nationals	69	93	.426	22
Arizona Diamondbacks	65	97	.401	26
Pittsburgh Pirates	57	105	.352	34

==== Record vs. opponents ====
2010 National League record Source: MLB Standings Grid – 2010
Team	AZ	ATL	CHC	CIN	COL	FLA	HOU	LAD	MIL	NYM	PHI	PIT	SD	SF	STL	WSH	AL
Arizona	–	3–4	1–6	2–5	9–9	3–3	4–3	5–13	3–4	5–1	2–4	2–4	8–10	5–13	4–5	3–4	6–9
Atlanta	4–3	–	4–2	3–2	2–4	11–7	5–1	5–3	5–2	11–7	8–10	6–3	4–2	4–3	2–6	8–10	9–6
Chicago	6–1	2–4	–	4–12	2–3	4–2	7–11	3–4	9–6	3–4	4–2	5–10	3–5	2–5	9–6	4–2	8–10
Cincinnati	5–2	2–3	12–4	–	2–5	5–2	10–5	5–4	11–3	4–2	2–5	10–6	2–4	3–4	6–12	4–3	8–7
Colorado	9–9	4–2	3–2	5–2	–	3–4	2–4	7–11	5–4	3–3	1–6	3–4	12–6	9–9	3–4	5–3	9–6
Florida	3–3	7–11	2–4	2–5	4–3	–	3–3	4–2	4–4	12–6	5–13	6–2	3–6	2–5	3–2	13–5	7–8
Houston	3–4	1–5	11–7	5–10	4–2	3–3	–	2–4	8–7	3–4	4–3	11–4	2–5	2–7	10–5	4–4	3–12
Los Angeles	13–5	3–5	4–3	4–5	11–7	2–4	4–2	–	4–2	3–4	2–4	4–3	8–10	8–10	3–4	3–3	4–11
Milwaukee	4–3	2–5	6–9	3–11	4–5	4–4	7–8	2–4	–	5–2	1–5	13–5	3–4	2–5	8–7	4–2	9–6
New York	1–5	7–11	4–3	2–4	3–3	6–12	4–3	4–3	2–5	–	9–9	6–1	3–3	3–4	3–3	9–9	13–5
Philadelphia	4–2	10–8	2–4	5–2	6–1	13–5	3–4	4–2	5–1	9–9	–	2–4	5–2	3–3	4–4	12–6	10–8
Pittsburgh	4–2	3–6	10–5	6–10	4–3	2–6	4–11	3–4	5–13	1–6	4–2	–	0–6	2–4	6–9	1–5	2–13
San Diego	10–8	2–4	5–3	4–2	6–12	6–3	5–2	10–8	4–3	3–3	2–5	6–0	–	12–6	3–4	3–3	9–6
San Francisco	13–5	3–4	5–2	4–3	9–9	5–2	7–2	10–8	5–2	4–3	3–3	4–2	6–12	–	3–3	4–2	7–8
St. Louis	5–4	6–2	6–9	12–6	4–3	2–3	5–10	4–3	7–8	3–3	4–4	9–6	4–3	3–3	–	3–3	9–6
Washington	4–3	10–8	2–4	3–4	3–5	5–13	4–4	3–3	2–4	9–9	6–12	5–1	3–3	2–4	3–3	–	5–13

=== Game log ===
2010 game log
April (9–14)

#	Date	Opponent	Score	Win	Loss	Save	Attendance	Record
1	April 5	Rockies	5–3	Jiménez (1–0)	Gallardo (0–1)	Morales (1)	45,808	0–1
2	April 6	Rockies	7–5	Wolf (1–0)	Smith (0–1)	Hoffman (1)	37,344	1–1
3	April 7	Rockies	5–4	Coffey (1–0)	Cook (0–1)	Hoffman (2)	35,793	2–1
4	April 9	Cardinals	5–4	Reyes (1–0)	Hoffman (0–1)	Franklin (2)	34,018	2–2
5	April 10	Cardinals	7–1	García (1–0)	Gallardo (0–2)		42,039	2–3
6	April 11	Cardinals	8–7	Hoffman (1–1)	McClellan (0–1)		33,294	3–3
7	April 12	@ Cubs	9–5	Dempster (1–0)	Davis (0–1)		41,306	3–4
8	April 14	@ Cubs	7–6	Gray (1–0)	Hawkins (0–1)	Mármol (3)	39,565	3–5
9	April 15	@ Cubs	8–6	Narveson (1–0)	Samardzija (0–1)	Hoffman (3)	38,026	4–5
10	April 16	@ Nationals	5–3	Bruney (1–0)	Hawkins (0–2)	Capps (5)	17,234	4–6
11	April 17	@ Nationals	8–0	Hernández (2–0)	Wolf (1–1)		18,673	4–7
12	April 18	@ Nationals	11–7	Vargas (1–0)	Marquis (0–3)		18,789	5–7
13	April 20	@ Pirates	8–1	Bush (1–0)	Morton (0–3)		9,386	6–7
14	April 21	@ Pirates	8–0	Gallardo (1–2)	Duke (2–1)		12,192	7–7
15	April 22	@ Pirates	20–0	Wolf (2–1)	McCutchen (0–2)		13,634	8–7
16	April 23	Cubs	8–1	Dempster (2–0)	Suppan (0–1)		37,848	8–8
17	April 24	Cubs	5–1	Lilly (1–0)	Davis (0–2)		43,410	8–9
18	April 25	Cubs	12–2	Wells (2–0)	Bush (1–1)		38,634	8–10
19	April 26	Pirates	17–3	Gallardo (2–2)	Duke (2–2)		25,892	9–10
20	April 27	Pirates	7–3	Donnelly (2–0)	Hoffman (1–2)		28,991	9–11
21	April 28	Pirates	6–5 (14)	Carrasco (1–0)	Parra (0–1)		28,401	9–12
22	April 29	@ Padres	9–0	LeBlanc (2–0)	Davis (0–3)		16,696	9–13
23	April 30	@ Padres	3–0	Richard (1–2)	Bush (1–2)	Bell (7)	29,366	9–14

May (12–16)

#	Date	Opponent	Score	Win	Loss	Save	Attendance	Record
24	May 1	@ Padres	2–1	Gallardo (3–2)	Latos (1–2)	Hoffman (4)	25,619	10–14
25	May 2	@ Padres	8–0	Garland (3–2)	Wolf (2–2)		20,074	10–15
26	May 4	@ Dodgers	11–6	Narveson (2–0)	Kershaw (1–2)		50,714	11–15
27	May 5	@ Dodgers	11–3	Davis (1–3)	Billingsley (2–0)		35,659	12–15
28	May 6	@ Dodgers	7–3	Broxton (2–0)	Hawkins (0–3)		38,456	12–16
29	May 7	@ Diamondbacks	3–2	Gallardo (4–2)	Jackson (1–4)	Hoffman (5)	27,067	13–16
30	May 8	@ Diamondbacks	17–3	Wolf (3–2)	Valdez (1–1)		26,877	14–16
31	May 9	@ Diamondbacks	6–1	Narveson (3–0)	Kennedy (2–2)		25,358	15–16
32	May 10	Braves	8–2	Hanson (3–2)	Davis (1–4)		24,365	15–17
33	May 11	Braves	11–3	Hudson (3–1)	Bush (1–3)		30,678	15–18
34	May 12	Braves	9–2	Lowe (5–3)	Parra (0–2)		30,175	15–19
35	May 14	Phillies	9–5	Moyer (5–2)	Wolf (3–3)		41,706	15–20
36	May 15	Phillies	10–6	Blanton (1–2)	Narveson (3–1)	Contreras (1)	43,069	15–21
37	May 16	Phillies	4–2	Hamels (4–2)	Bush (1–4)	Romero (1)	37,023	15–22
38	May 17	@ Reds	6–3	Cueto (3–1)	Coffey (1–1)	Cordero (13)	12,409	15–23
39	May 18	@ Reds	5–4	Fisher (1–1)	Hoffman (1–3)		17,697	15–24
40	May 19	@ Pirates	6–4	López (1–0)	Wolf (3–4)	Dotel (9)	9,526	15–25
41	May 20	@ Pirates	4–3	Narveson (4–1)	Maholm (3–4)	Villanueva (1)	13,975	16–25
42	May 21	@ Twins	15–3	Blackburn (1–5)	Bush (1–5)		38,737	16–26
43	May 22	@ Twins	8–7 (12)	Crain (1–0)	Parra (0–3)		39,152	16–27
44	May 23	@ Twins	4–3	Parra (1–3)	Pavano (4–5)	Axford (1)	38,952	17–27
45	May 25	Astros	6–1	Wolf (4–4)	Paulino (0–7)		27,363	18–27
46	May 26	Astros	5–0	Oswalt (3–6)	Narveson (4–2)		30,151	18–28
47	May 27	Astros	4–3 (10)	Axford (1–0)	Lindstrom (1–1)		34,355	19–28
48	May 28	Mets	2–0	Gallardo (5–2)	Igarashi (0–1)		32,773	20–28
49	May 29	Mets	8–6	Coffey (2–1)	Nieve (1–3)	Axford (2)	37,841	21–28
50	May 30	Mets	10–4	Dickey (2–0)	Suppan (0–2)		36,559	21–29
51	May 31	@ Marlins	13–5	Sosa (1–0)	Narveson (4–3)		10,115	21–30

June (14–13)

#	Date	Opponent	Score	Win	Loss	Save	Attendance	Record
52	June 1	@ Marlins	6–4	Nolasco (5–4)	Hoffman (1–4)	Núñez (11)	11,202	21–31
53	June 2	@ Marlins	7–4	Gallardo (6–2)	Sosa (1–1)	Axford (3)	11,468	22–31
54	June 3	@ Marlins	3–2	Johnson (6–2)	Capuano (0–1)	Núñez (12)	11,717	22–32
55	June 4	@ Cardinals	8–0	Wainwright (8–3)	Wolf (4–5)		43,261	22–33
56	June 5	@ Cardinals	5–4 (11)	Boggs (1–2)	Axford (1–1)		44,180	22–34
57	June 6	@ Cardinals	4–3 (10)	Braddock (1–0)	Motte (2–2)	Axford (4)	40,467	23–34
58	June 8	Cubs	3–2	Axford (2–1)	Mármol (1–1)		30,082	24–34
59	June 9	Cubs	9–4	Zambrano (2–4)	Wolf (4–6)		30,326	24–35
60	June 10	Cubs	5–4 (10)	Axford (3–1)	Howry (1–1)		36,363	25–35
61	June 11	Rangers	6–2	Narveson (5–3)	Harden (3–3)		33,099	26–35
62	June 12	Rangers	4–3	Feldman (4–6)	Parra (1–4)	Ray (1)	39,791	26–36
63	June 13	Rangers	7–2	Lewis (6–4)	Gallardo (6–3)		36,059	26–37
64	June 14	@ Angels	12–2	Wolf (5–6)	Saunders (5–7)		39,289	27–37
65	June 15	@ Angels	7–1	Bush (2–5)	Santana (6–5)		37,484	28–37
66	June 16	@ Angels	5–1	Piñeiro (6–6)	Narveson (5–4)		37,416	28–38
67	June 18	@ Rockies	2–0	Hammel (5–3)	Parra (1–5)	Corpas (9)	32,340	28–39
68	June 19	@ Rockies	8–7	Belisle (2–3)	Braddock (1–1)	Betancourt (1)	39,192	28–40
69	June 20	@ Rockies	6–1	Hoffman (2–4)	Corpas (1–4)		46,511	29–40
70	June 22	Twins	7–5	Narveson (6–4)	Baker (6–6)	Axford (5)	36,595	30–40
71	June 23	Twins	5–3	Parra (2–5)	Liriano (6–5)	Axford (6)	33,362	31–40
72	June 24	Twins	5–0	Gallardo (7–3)	Blackburn (6–5)		35,898	32–40
73	June 25	Mariners	8–3	Bush (3–5)	Rowland-Smith (1–7)		30,087	33–40
74	June 26	Mariners	5–4	Sweeney (1–0)	Wolf (5–7)	League (2)	41,655	33–41
75	June 27	Mariners	3–0	Narveson (7–4)	Vargas (6–3)	Axford (7)	41,995	34–41
76	June 28	Astros	9–5	Chacín (1–0)	Coffey (2–2)		27,908	34–42
77	June 29	Astros	7–5	Gallardo (8–3)	Myers (5–6)	Axford (8)	32,907	35–42
78	June 30	Astros	5–1	Rodríguez (5–10)	Bush (3–6)		30,114	35–43

July (13–14)

#	Date	Opponent	Score	Win	Loss	Save	Attendance	Record
79	July 1	@ Cardinals	4–1	Wolf (6–7)	Hawksworth (2–5)	Axford (9)	40,302	36–43
80	July 2	@ Cardinals	5–0	García (8–4)	Narveson (7–5)		43,028	36–44
81	July 3	@ Cardinals	12–5	Parra (3–5)	Carpenter (9–2)		43,276	37–44
82	July 4	@ Cardinals	7–1	Wainwright (12–5)	Gallardo (8–4)		38,581	37–45
83	July 5	Giants	6–1	Sánchez (7–6)	Loe (0–1)		36,185	37–46
84	July 6	Giants	6–1	Bumgarner (1–2)	Wolf (6–8)		30,896	37–47
85	July 7	Giants	15–2	Lincecum (9–4)	Narveson (7–6)		29,387	37–48
86	July 8	Giants	9–3	Runzler (3–0)	Parra (3–6)		34,590	37–49
87	July 9	Pirates	5–4 (10)	Axford (4–1)	Meek (4–3)		27,767	38–49
88	July 10	Pirates	4–3	Bush (4–6)	Karstens (2–4)	Axford (10)	38,588	39–49
89	July 11	Pirates	6–5	Axford (5–1)	Dotel (2–2)		34,598	40–49
90	July 15	@ Braves	2–1	Jurrjens (2–3)	Bush (4–7)	Wagner (21)	35,057	40–50
91	July 16	@ Braves	9–3	Wolf (7–8)	Hanson (8–6)		37,014	41–50
92	July 17	@ Braves	6–3	Narveson (8–6)	Hudson (9–5)	Axford (11)	48,174	42–50
93	July 18	@ Braves	11–6	Lowe (10–8)	Parra (3–7)		24,732	42–51
94	July 19	@ Pirates	3–1	Capuano (1–1)	Karstens (2–5)	Axford (12)	12,375	43–51
95	July 20	@ Pirates	11–9	Carrasco (2–2)	Bush (4–8)	Dotel (20)	13,202	43–52
96	July 21	@ Pirates	15–3	Duke (4–9)	Wolf (7–9)		13,532	43–53
97	July 22	@ Pirates	3–2	Gallardo (9–4)	Ohlendorf (1–8)	Axford (13)	18,715	44–53
98	July 23	Nationals	7–5	Loe (1–1)	Burnett (0–5)	Axford (14)	34,822	45–53
99	July 24	Nationals	4–3	Axford (6–1)	Storen (2–2)		41,987	46–53
100	July 25	Nationals	8–3	Bush (5–8)	Detwiler (0–1)		42,414	47–53
101	July 26	Reds	3–2	Villanueva (1–0)	Arroyo (10–6)	Axford (15)	31,945	48–53
102	July 27	Reds	12–4	Ondrusek (2–0)	Gallardo (9–5)		32,286	48–54
103	July 28	Reds	10–2	Wood (1–1)	Narveson (8–7)		38,365	48–55
104	July 30	@ Astros	5–0	Happ (2–0)	Parra (3–8)		27,456	48–56
105	July 31	@ Astros	6–0	Rodríguez (9–11)	Bush (5–9)		38,824	48–57

August (14–13)

#	Date	Opponent	Score	Win	Loss	Save	Attendance	Record
106	August 1	@ Astros	5–2	Wright (1–1)	Loe (1–2)	Lyon (2)	27,964	48–58
107	August 2	@ Cubs	18–1	Gallardo (10–5)	Wells (5–9)		37,731	49–58
108	August 3	@ Cubs	4–3	Narveson (9–7)	Diamond (0–1)	Axford (16)	36,183	50–58
109	August 4	@ Cubs	15–3	Dempster (9–8)	Parra (3–9)		38,425	50–59
110	August 6	Astros	6–5	Loe (2–2)	Lindstrom (2–2)		33,952	51–59
111	August 7	Astros	5–2	Wolf (8–9)	Myers (8–7)	Hoffman (6)	39,410	52–59
112	August 8	Astros	11–6	Gallardo (11–5)	Wright (1–2)		39,339	53–59
113	August 9	Diamondbacks	7–4 (10)	Demel (1–0)	Hoffman (2–5)	Heilman (6)	29,633	53–60
114	August 10	Diamondbacks	2–1	Boyer (3–2)	Capuano (1–2)	Demel (1)	35,029	53–61
115	August 11	Diamondbacks	8–2	Hudson (4–1)	Bush (5–10)		29,611	53–62
116	August 12	Diamondbacks	8–4	Wolf (9–9)	López (5–11)	Axford (17)	34,808	54–62
117	August 13	@ Rockies	5–4	Buchholz (1–0)	Loe (2–3)	Street (8)	39,142	54–63
118	August 14	@ Rockies	5–4 (10)	Axford (7–1)	Street (2–4)		45,264	55–63
119	August 15	@ Rockies	6–5	Betancourt (2–1)	Hoffman (2–6)		48,133	55–64
120	August 17	@ Cardinals	3–2	Bush (6–10)	García (10–6)	Axford (18)	45,380	56–64
121	August 18	@ Cardinals	3–2	Wolf (10–9)	Wainwright (17–7)	Hoffman (8)	41,400	57–64
122	August 20	Padres	10–6	Capuano (2–2)	LeBlanc (7–11)		27,976	58–64
123	August 21	Padres	6–5	McClendon (1–0)	Correia (10–8)	Axford (19)	40,056	59–64
124	August 22	Padres	7–3	Garland (13–8)	Parra (3–10)		32,126	59–65
125	August 24	Dodgers	5–3	Lilly (8–8)	Bush (6–11)	Kuo (5)	39,055	59–66
126	August 25	Dodgers	5–4	Kuroda (9–11)	Wolf (10–10)	Dotel (22)	30,545	59–67
127	August 26	Dodgers	7–1	Belisario (2–1)	Gallardo (11–6)		32,333	59–68
128	August 27	Pirates	7–2	Narveson (10–7)	McDonald (2–4)		32,130	60–68
129	August 28	Pirates	8–7 (11)	Loe (3–3)	Ledezma (0–1)		37,782	61–68
130	August 29	Pirates	8–4	Bush (7–11)	Morton (1–10)	Hoffman (8)	35,733	62–68
131	August 30	@ Reds	5–4 (10)	Cordero (5–4)	Hoffman (2–7)		14,589	62–69
132	August 31	@ Reds	8–4	LeCure (2–4)	Gallardo (11–7)		19,218	62–70

September/October (15–15)

#	Date	Opponent	Score	Win	Loss	Save	Attendance	Record
133	September 1	@ Reds	6–1	Chapman (1–0)	Coffey (2–3)		16,412	62–71
134	September 3	@ Phillies	1–0	Hamels (9–10)	Capuano (2–3)	Madson (5)	44,570	62–72
135	September 4	@ Phillies	5–4	Halladay (17–10)	Loe (3–4)	Lidge (20)	45,393	62–73
136	September 5	@ Phillies	6–2	Wolf (11–10)	Kendrick (9–8)	Axford (20)	45,006	63–73
137	September 6	Cardinals	8–6	Boggs (2–2)	Braddock (1–2)		35,190	63–74
138	September 7	Cardinals	4–2	Narveson (11–7)	Lohse (2–7)	Hoffman (9, career #600)	33,149	64–74
139	September 8	Cardinals	8–1	Capuano (3–3)	García (13–7)		34,298	65–74
140	September 10	Cubs	4–0	Zambrano (8–6)	Bush (7–12)	Mármol (29)	30,975	65–75
141	September 11	Cubs	1–0	Dempster (13–10)	Wolf (11–11)	Mármol (30)	41,463	65–76
142	September 12	Cubs	2–0	Gallardo (12–7)	Coleman (1–2)	Axford (21)	37,317	66–76
143	September 13	@ Astros	4–2	Myers (12–7)	Kintzler (0–1)	Lindstrom (23)	31,342	66–77
144	September 14	@ Astros	3–2	Norris (8–8)	Capuano (3–4)	Lyon (16)	33,878	66–78
145	September 15	@ Astros	8–6 (10)	Axford (8–1)	Lindstrom (2–5)		30,791	67–78
146	September 17	@ Giants	3–0	Wolf (12–11)	Bumgarner (5–6)		41,835	68–78
147	September 18	@ Giants	2–1	Gallardo (13–7)	Lincecum (14–10)	Axford (22)	41,767	69–78
148	September 19	@ Giants	9–2	Zito (9–13)	Narveson (11–8)		41,113	69–79
149	September 20	Reds	5–2	Masset (4–4)	Loe (3–5)	Cordero (37)	30,024	69–80
150	September 21	Reds	4–3	Vólquez (4–3)	Bush (7–13)	Cordero (38)	22,761	69–81
151	September 22	Reds	13–1	Wolf (13–11)	Cueto (12–6)		27,004	70–81
152	September 23	Marlins	8–3	Gallardo (14–7)	Sánchez (12–11)		31,212	71–81
153	September 24	Marlins	6–2	Jeffress (1–0)	Miller (1–4)		32,235	72–81
154	September 25	Marlins	4–0	Volstad (11–9)	Narveson (11–9)		34,325	72–82
155	September 26	Marlins	7–1	Capuano (4–4)	Méndez (1–2)		29,059	73–82
–	September 27	@ Mets	Postponed (rain) Rescheduled for September 29					
156	September 28	@ Mets	4–3	Dessens (4–2)	Axford (8–2)		24,666	73–83
157	September 29	@ Mets	8–7	Villanueva (2–0)	Acosta (3–2)	Axford (23)	22,500	74–83
158	September 29	@ Mets	3–1	Bush (8–13)	Dickey (11–9)	Hoffman (10)	28,280	75–83
159	September 30	@ Mets	9–2	Narveson (12–9)	Gee (2–2)		24,661	76–83
160	October 1	@ Reds	4–3 (11)	McClendon (2–0)	LeCure (2–5)	Axford (24)	28,844	77–83
161	October 2	@ Reds	7–4	Ondrusek (5–0)	Coffey (2–4)	Cordero (39)	28,173	77–84
162	October 3	@ Reds	3–2	Maloney (2–2)	Wolf (13–12)	Cordero (40)	37,582	77–85

Brewers Win Brewers loss Game Postponed

=== Roster ===
2010 Milwaukee Brewers
Roster
Pitchers: 59 John Axford; 13 Zach Braddock; 31 Dave Bush; 39 Chris Capuano; 60 Todd Coffey; 25 Doug Davis; 45 Marco Estrada; 49 Yovani Gallardo; 32 LaTroy Hawkins; 51 Trevor Hoffman; 41 Jeremy Jeffress; 61 Brandon Kintzler; 50 Kameron Loe; 58 Mike McClendon; 38 Chris Narveson; 26 Manny Parra; 54 David Riske; 37 Mark Rogers; 52 Chris Smith; 57 Mitch Stetter; 37 Jeff Suppan; 46 Claudio Vargas; 12 Carlos Villanueva; 43 Randy Wolf	Catchers: 16 George Kottaras; 20 Jonathan Lucroy; 9 Gregg Zaun; Infielders: 30 Craig Counsell; 10 Luis Cruz; 21 Alcides Escobar; 28 Prince Fielder; 24 Mat Gamel; 14 Casey McGehee; 23 Rickie Weeks	Outfielders: 8 Ryan Braun; 36 Lorenzo Cain; 11,7 Chris Dickerson; 15 Jim Edmonds; 22 Jody Gerut; 27 Carlos Gómez; 1 Corey Hart; 2 Joe Inglett; 11 Adam Stern	Manager: 40 Ken Macha; Coaches: 35 Brad Fischer (third base); 53 Stan Kyles (Bullpen); 47 Rick Peterson (pitching); 33 Willie Randolph (Bench); 6 Ed Sedar (first base); 29 Dale Sveum (hitting)

== Player stats ==
=== Batting ===
==== Starters by position ====
Note: Pos = Position; G = Games played; AB = At bats; H = Hits; Avg. = Batting average; HR = Home runs; RBI = Runs batted in

Pos	Player	G	AB	H	Avg.	HR	RBI
C	Jonathan Lucroy	75	277	70	.253	4	26
1B	Prince Fielder	161	578	151	.261	32	83
2B	Rickie Weeks	160	651	175	.269	29	83
SS	Alcides Escobar	145	506	119	.235	4	41
3B	Casey McGehee	157	610	174	.285	23	104
LF	Ryan Braun	157	619	188	.304	25	103
CF	Carlos Gómez	97	291	72	.247	5	24
RF	Corey Hart	145	558	158	.283	31	102

Through October 3, 2010

==== Other batters ====
Note: G = Games played; AB = At bats; H = Hits; Avg. = Batting average; HR = Home runs; RBI = Runs batted in

Player	G	AB	H	Avg.	HR	RBI
Jim Edmonds	73	217	62	.286	8	20
George Kottaras	67	212	43	.203	4	26
Craig Counsell	102	204	51	.250	2	21
Lorenzo Cain	43	147	45	.306	1	13
Joe Inglett	102	142	36	.254	1	8
Gregg Zaun	28	102	27	.265	2	14
Jody Gerut	32	71	14	.197	2	8
Chris Dickerson	25	53	11	.208	0	5
Luis Cruz	7	17	4	.235	0	1
Mat Gamel	12	15	3	.200	0	1
Adam Stern	6	8	0	.000	0	1

Through October 3, 2010

=== Pitching ===
==== Starting and other pitchers ====
Note: G = Games pitched; GS = Games started; IP = Innings pitched; W = Wins; L = Losses; ERA = Earned run average; SO = Strikeouts; WHIP = Walks+hits per inning pitched

Player	G	GS	IP	W	L	ERA	SO	WHIP
Randy Wolf	34	34	215.2	13	12	4.17	142	1.39
Yovani Gallardo	31	31	185.0	14	7	3.84	200	1.37
Dave Bush	32	31	174.1	8	13	4.54	107	1.51
Chris Narveson	37	28	167.2	12	9	4.99	137	1.38
Manny Parra	42	16	122.0	3	10	5.02	129	1.62
Chris Capuano	24	9	66.0	4	4	3.95	54	1.30
Doug Davis	8	8	38.1	1	4	7.51	34	1.98
Mark Rogers	4	2	10.0	0	0	1.80	11	0.50

Through October 3, 2010

==== Relief pitchers ====
Note: G = Games pitched; W = Wins; L = Losses; SV = Saves; IP = Innings pitched; ERA = Earned run average; SO = Strikeouts; WHIP = Walks+hits per inning pitched

Player	G	W	L	SV	IP	ERA	SO	WHIP
John Axford	50	8	2	24	58.0	2.48	76	1.19
Todd Coffey	69	2	4	0	62.1	4.76	56	1.41
Kameron Loe	53	3	5	0	58.1	2.78	46	1.18
Carlos Villanueva	50	2	1	1	52.2	4.61	67	1.33
Trevor Hoffman	50	2	7	10	47.1	5.89	30	1.44
Zach Braddock	46	1	2	0	33.2	2.94	41	1.43
David Riske	23	0	0	0	23.1	5.01	16	1.41
LaTroy Hawkins	18	0	3	0	16.0	8.44	18	1.69
Mike McClendon	17	2	0	0	21.0	3.00	21	1.05
Claudio Vargas	17	1	0	0	19.2	7.32	18	1.93
Jeff Suppan	15	0	2	0	31.0	7.84	18	2.00
Jeremy Jeffress	10	1	0	0	10.0	2.70	8	1.40
Mitch Stetter	9	0	0	0	3.2	14.73	3	2.73
Marco Estrada	7	0	0	0	11.1	9.53	13	1.77
Brandon Kintzler	7	0	1	0	7.1	7.36	9	1.91
Chris Smith	3	0	0	0	3.1	5.40	4	1.50
Joe Inglett	1	0	0	0	1.0	0.00	0	0.00

Through October 3, 2010

== Farm system ==
The Brewers' farm system consisted of seven minor league affiliates in 2010. The Helena Brewers won the Pioneer League championship, and the AZL Brewers won the Arizona League championship.

Level	Team	League	Manager
Triple-A	Nashville Sounds	Pacific Coast League	Don Money
Double-A	Huntsville Stars	Southern League	Mike Guerrero
Class A-Advanced	Brevard County Manatees	Florida State League	Bobby Misci
Class A	Wisconsin Timber Rattlers	Midwest League	Jeff Isom
Rookie	Helena Brewers	Pioneer League	Joe Ayrault
Rookie	AZL Brewers	Arizona League	Tony Diggs
Rookie	DSL Brewers	Dominican Summer League	Néstor Corredor
