= Todd Coffey =

American baseball player (born 1980)

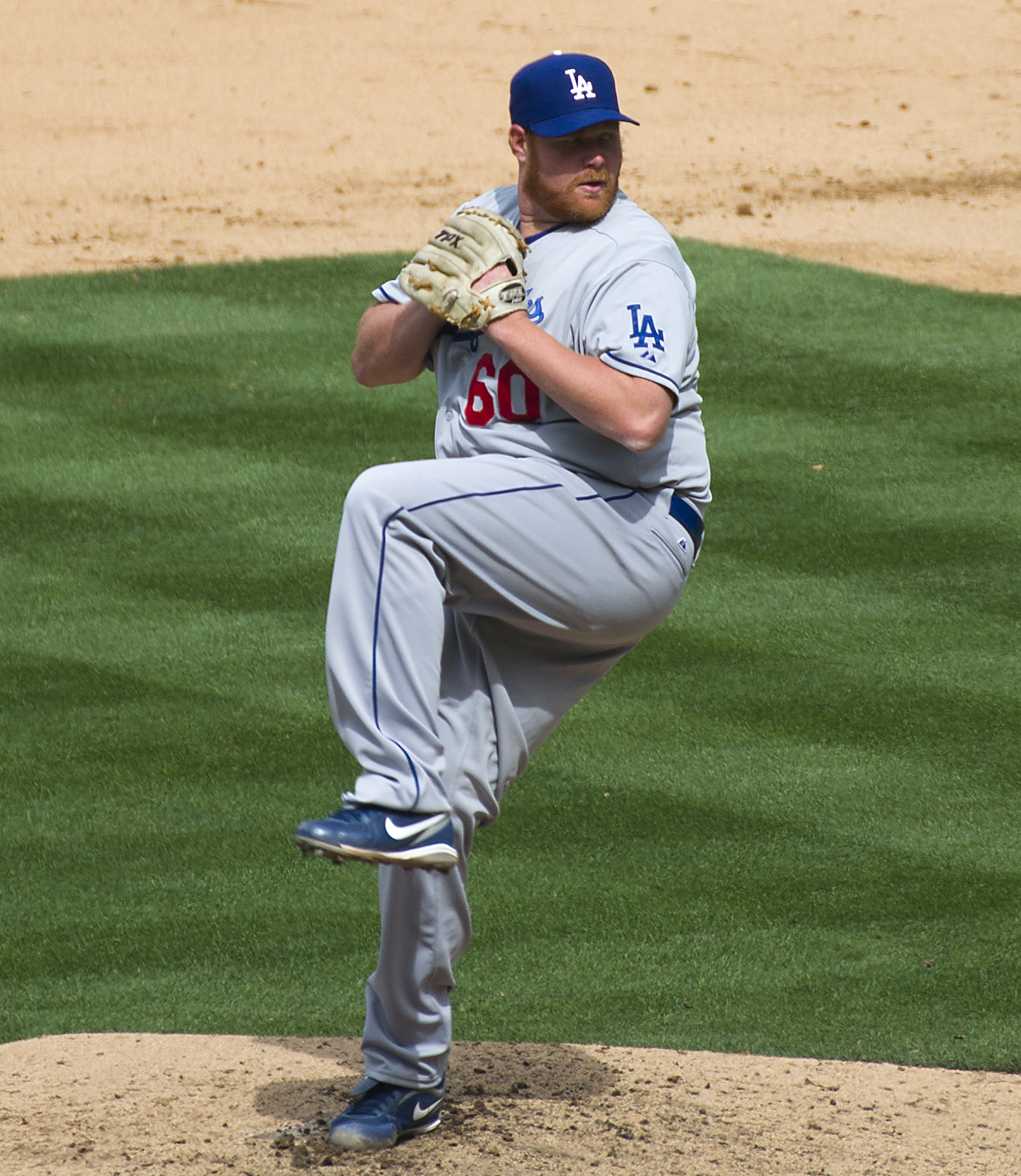
- Coffey with the Los Angeles Dodgers in 2012
- Pitcher
- Born: September 9, 1980 (age 45); Forest City, North Carolina, U.S.
- Batted: Right Threw: Right

MLB debut
- April 19, 2005, for the Cincinnati Reds

Last MLB appearance
- July 2, 2012, for the Los Angeles Dodgers

MLB statistics
- Win–loss record: 25–18
- Earned run average: 4.10
- Strikeouts: 329
- Stats at Baseball Reference

Teams
- Cincinnati Reds (2005–2008); Milwaukee Brewers (2008–2010); Washington Nationals (2011); Los Angeles Dodgers (2012)

Justin Todd Coffey (born September 9, 1980) is an American former professional baseball pitcher. He played in Major League Baseball (MLB) for the Cincinnati Reds, Milwaukee Brewers, Washington Nationals, and Los Angeles Dodgers. He was born in Forest City, North Carolina.

== Career ==
=== Cincinnati Reds ===
Coffey was drafted by the Cincinnati Reds in the 41st round of the 1998 Major League Baseball draft out of Chase High School in Forest City, North Carolina. A draft-and-follow prospect, Coffey signed with the Reds for a $1,000 signing bonus and $850 monthly salary.

Coffey missed the 2000 season because of an elbow injury and remained in the Reds minor league system through 2005. He made his major league debut on April 19, 2005, pitching two innings and giving up two runs against the Chicago Cubs. He picked up his first win in a two inning relief appearance against the San Diego Padres on May 10, 2005, and his first save against the Pittsburgh Pirates on August 28, 2005. Overall, he spent four years with the Reds and pitched in 213 games, with a 12–9 record and 4.62 ERA and 9 saves, 8 of which he recorded in 2006.

=== Milwaukee Brewers ===
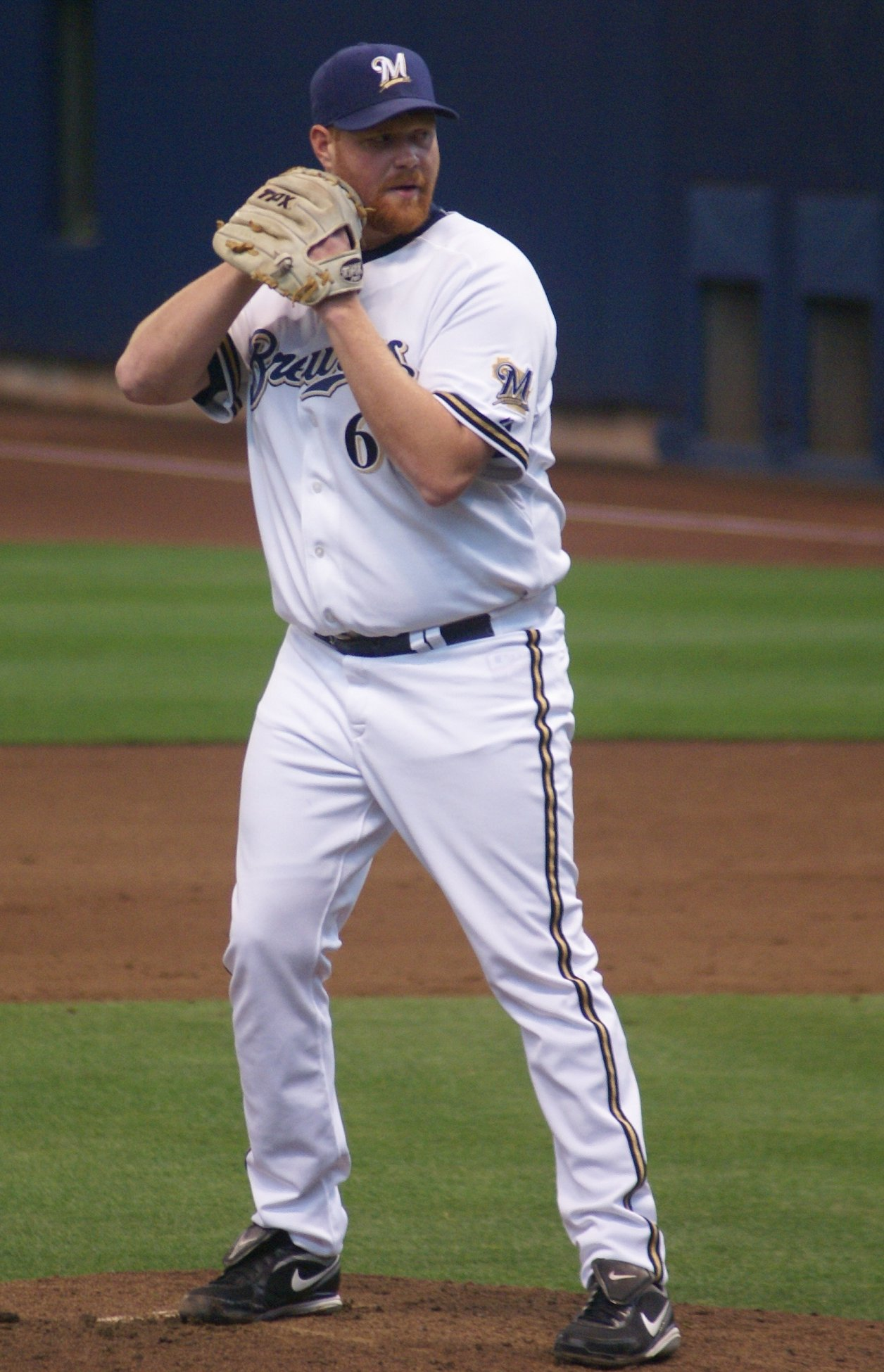
Coffey pitching for the Milwaukee Brewers in 2009.

On September 9, 2008, Coffey was designated for assignment by the Reds and claimed by the Milwaukee Brewers on September 12.

On April 22, 2009, Coffey made an appearance as the closer for the Brewers; he held the role until Trevor Hoffman returned from an injury. He picked up two saves in that role, while also suffering 2 blown saves. He remained with the Brewers through 2010 and was 2–4 with a 4.76 ERA in 69 games.

On December 2, 2010, the Brewers announced the team would not offer him arbitration and he became a free agent.

=== Washington Nationals ===
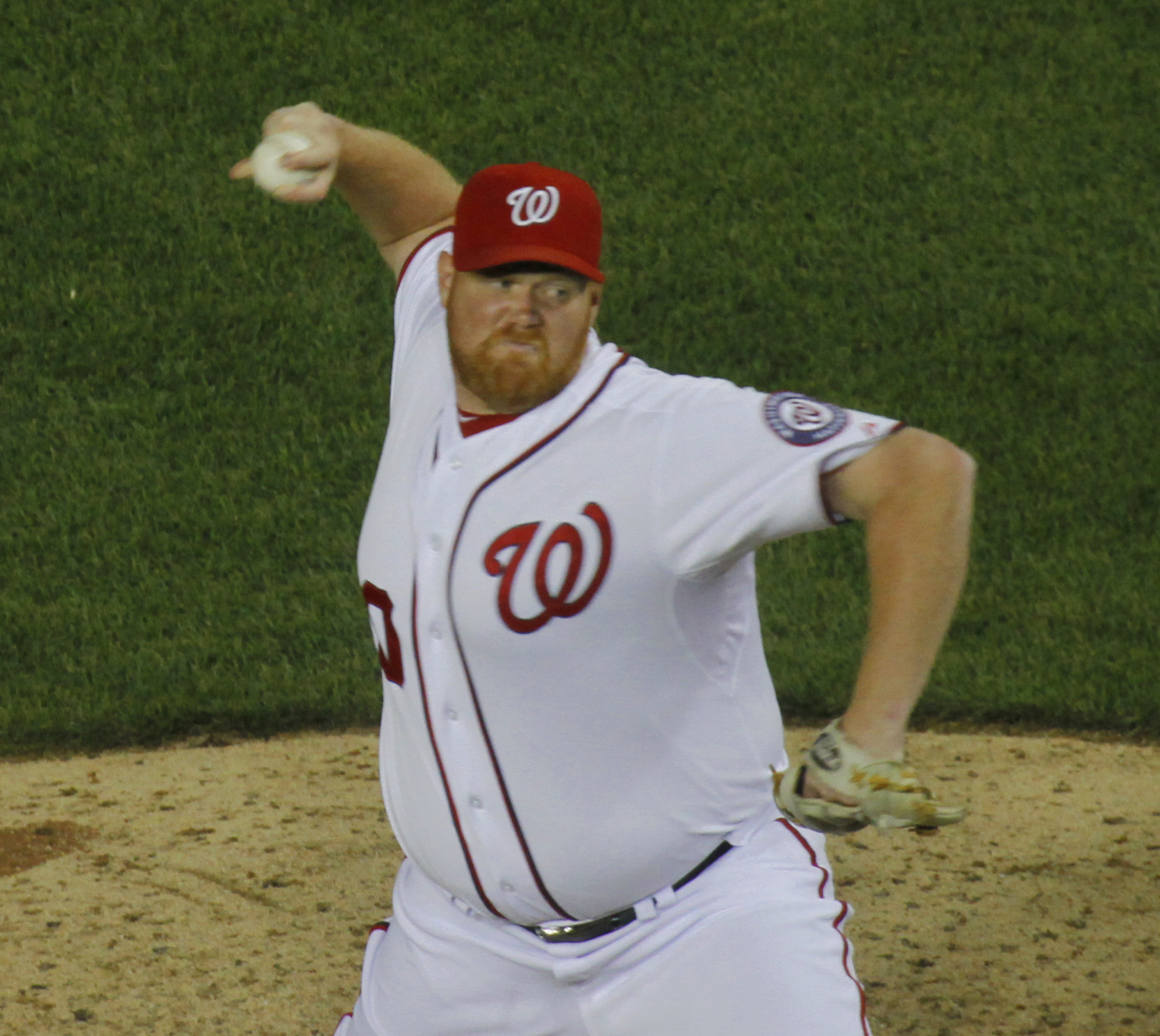
Coffey pitching for the Nationals in 2011.

On January 24, 2011, Coffey signed with the Washington Nationals. He finished the year with a 3.62 ERA and 5–1 record in 69 games before again becoming a free agent. He became a free agent following the season.

=== Los Angeles Dodgers ===
On February 3, 2012, Coffey signed a one-year, $1 million contract with the Los Angeles Dodgers that contained a 2013 club option worth $2.5 million. Coffey pitched in 23 games for the Dodgers, with an ERA of 4.66. However, on July 2, Coffey injured his shoulder while pitching against the Cincinnati Reds. On July 3, it was announced that Coffey would undergo Tommy John surgery for the second time of his career and miss the rest of the 2012 season. The Dodgers declined his 2013 option on October 29, 2012.

=== Seattle Mariners ===
On May 20, 2014, Coffey signed a minor league deal with the Seattle Mariners. Coffey passed his physical on May 22, making the deal official. He served as the closer for the Mariners' Triple-A team the Tacoma Rainiers for the remainder of the season, and was released on September 4.

=== Atlanta Braves ===
On February 12, 2015, Coffey signed a minor league contract with the Atlanta Braves. He was released on April 5.

=== Diablos Rojos del Mexico ===
On June 4, 2015, Coffey signed with the Diablos Rojos del Mexico of the Mexican League. He was released on July 6. In 11 games 9.2 innings of relief he went 2-0 with a 4.66 ERA and 4 strikeouts.

=== Long Island Ducks ===
On April 8, 2016, Coffey signed with the Long Island Ducks of the Atlantic League of Professional Baseball. In 45 appearances for the Ducks, he compiled a 3-4 record and 3.07 ERA with 42 strikeouts and 27 saves across 44 innings pitched. Coffey became a free agent after the season.

== Pitching style ==
Coffey mainly threw two pitches: a sinking fastball that went up to 95–96 mph, and a sharp dropping slider at 81–82 mph.

He was known for his full-speed sprints from the bullpen to the mound when he was brought into games. According to Coffey, this started when he was in Cincinnati, when during one game he was so distracted while warming up, he wasn't aware that it was his time to pitch, and he quickly ran from the bullpen onto the mound, and the run caused so much of a rush in Coffey, he chose to continue the sprint to the pitching mound from then on. As a result, the Brewers introduced a "Coffey Time!" graphic on the scoreboard that kept track of Coffey's time to sprint from the bullpen to the pitcher's mound after getting called out to pitch. Also, while with the Brewers, Coffey's intro music was the entrance music of the pro wrestler The Ultimate Warrior, who would run full-sprint to the ring as his entrance.
