= Chris Narveson =

American baseball player (born 1981)

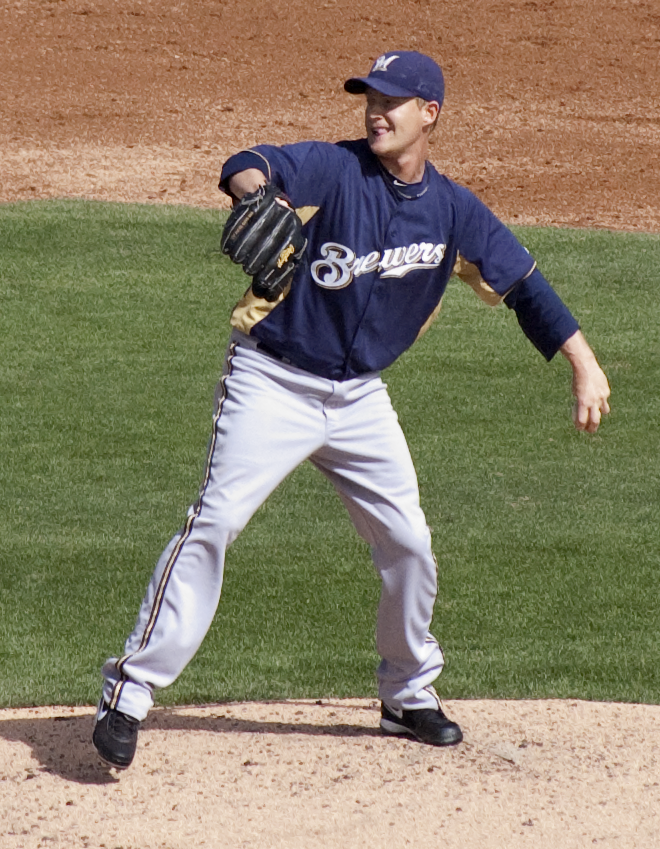
- Narveson with the Milwaukee Brewers in 2011
- Pitcher
- Born: December 20, 1981 (age 44); Englewood, Colorado, U.S.
- Batted: Left Threw: Left

Professional debut
- MLB: September 8, 2006, for the St. Louis Cardinals
- NPB: April 8, 2014, for the Tokyo Yakult Swallows

Last appearance
- MLB: April 19, 2016, for the Miami Marlins
- NPB: September 29, 2014, for the Tokyo Yakult Swallows

MLB statistics
- Win–loss record: 30–19
- Earned run average: 4.71
- Strikeouts: 364

NPB statistics
- Win–loss record: 4–11
- Earned run average: 4.53
- Strikeouts: 96
- Stats at Baseball Reference

Teams
- St. Louis Cardinals (2006); Milwaukee Brewers (2009–2013); Tokyo Yakult Swallows (2014); Miami Marlins (2015–2016)

Christopher Gregg Narveson (/ˈnɑːrvɪsən/; born December 20, 1981) is an American former professional baseball pitcher. He played in Major League Baseball (MLB) for the St. Louis Cardinals, Milwaukee Brewers, and Miami Marlins and in Nippon Professional Baseball (NPB) for the Tokyo Yakult Swallows.

== Baseball career ==
=== St. Louis Cardinals ===
Narveson was originally drafted out of T. C. Roberson High School in Asheville, North Carolina, by the St. Louis Cardinals in the 2nd round of the 2000 MLB draft. He remained in the Cardinals' farm system through 2004, including appearing in the 2003 All-Star Futures Game for the USA Team.

=== Colorado Rockies ===
Narveson was traded by the Cardinals to the Colorado Rockies on August 11, 2004, along with Luis Martinez, to complete an early trade for Larry Walker. He made four starts in Double-A for the Tulsa Drillers.

=== Boston Red Sox ===
On March 30, 2005, Narveson was traded by the Rockies to the Boston Red Sox with catcher Charles Johnson for reliever Byung-hyun Kim. He made 21 appearances (20 starts) for the Triple–A Pawtucket Red Sox, with an ERA of 4.77.

=== St. Louis Cardinals ===
Narveson returned to the Cardinals on August 8, 2005, when they selected him off waivers from the Red Sox. He made 15 starts in 2006 for the Triple–A Memphis Redbirds with a 2.81 ERA and was called up to the big leagues for the first time when rosters expanded in September. He made his Major League debut by working 2 innings of relief on September 8, 2006, against the Arizona Diamondbacks, allowing two earned runs. He made his first start on September 22, against the Houston Astros but only lasted 4 innings. Overall, he made 5 appearances (with the 1 start) for the Cardinals in 2006 and had an ERA of 4.82 with no decisions. He only made 12 minor league starts in 2007 due to a left shoulder injury.

=== Milwaukee Brewers ===
Narveson signed as a minor league free agent with the Milwaukee Brewers on December 4, 2007, and spent the 2008 season with the Triple–A Nashville Sounds, where he was 6–13 with a 5.43 ERA in 28 appearances (22 starts).

Narveson was recalled by the Brewers from Nashville on June 14, 2009 and pitched in his first game with Milwaukee on June 15. He was outrighted to Nashville on July 13 after being designated for assignment. He was called up again on August 21 and appeared in a game the next day, earning his first major league win. He entered the Brewers starting rotation on September 13 making a spot start in place of Manny Parra and gained his first major league win as a starter on September 23, striking out 10 in the process.

Narveson made the Brewers' roster in 2010 with the intention of him being a long distance reliever and a spot starter. However, the struggles of Manny Parra gave Narveson the chance to start and he ended up being the Brewers' 5th starter for the second half of the season. Narveson finished the season with a 12–9 record in 28 starts, a 4.99 ERA, and 137 strikeouts in 167 2/3 innings pitched.

Narveson was named the 5th starter on a revamped Brewers starting rotation for 2011. He started 28 games for the Brewers in 2011 and finished with an 11–8 record, with a 4.45 ERA and 126 strikeouts in 161 innings pitched. Narveson just missed starting 30 games on the season, but due to an injury on his left thumb caused by a pair of scissors, Narveson missed 2 of his scheduled starts.

Narveson missed almost all of the 2012 season due to an injury to, and surgery on his throwing arm's torn rotator cuff. He had a 1–1 record in 2 starts, with an ERA of 7.00. He was replaced as a starter by Marco Estrada. He became a free agent on October 1, 2013.

=== Tokyo Yakult Swallows ===
On December 26, 2013, Narveson signed with the Tokyo Yakult Swallows of Nippon Professional Baseball. He made 24 starts for the Swallows during the 2014 campaign, compiling a 4-11 record and 4.53 ERA with 96 strikeouts over 137 innings of work. Narveson became a free agent following the season.

=== Miami Marlins ===
On December 2, 2014, Narveson signed a minor league contract with the Miami Marlins. He had his contract selected to the major league roster on August 5, 2015. He became a free agent following the season on October 12.

On January 9, 2016, Narveson re-signed with the Miami Marlins on a minor league contract. He had his contract selected to the major league roster on April 3. He was designated for assignment on April 21, he cleared waivers and was sent outright to Triple-A New Orleans Zephyrs on April 24. Narveson had his contract selected back to the major league roster again on August 9. He was designated for assignment a second time on August 19, he cleared waivers and was again sent outright to Triple-A on August 21. He elected free agency after the season on October 11.

=== Cleveland Indians ===
On February 14, 2017, Narveson signed a minor league contract with the Cleveland Indians that included an invitation to spring training. Narveson announced his retirement on Twitter on September 3.
