= Ramon Borrego =

Venezuelan baseball coach (born 1978)

Minnesota Twins – No. 46
- Coach
- Born: June 7, 1978 (age 48); Maracay, Venezuela
- Bats: Switch Throws: Right

Teams
- Minnesota Twins (2025–present)

Ramon Celestino Borrego (born June 7, 1978) is a Venezuelan professional baseball coach and former utility player who is currently the third base coach for the Minnesota Twins of Major League Baseball (MLB).

== Early life and career ==
Borrego was born in Maracay, Venezuela, in 1978. In 1995, he was signed by the Minnesota Twins as an international free agent. He played for the Twins respective affiliates in the Gulf Coast League and Appalachian League for two years, before making his professional debut in 1998, in Single-A, for the Fort Wayne Wizards, followed by two years in High-A for the Fort Myers Miracle.

In 2002, after a promotion to Double A with the New Britain Rock Cats, Borrego reached the highest level he'd ever play at, with the Edmonton Trappers in Triple A. He bounced between the Rock Cats and Trappers in the 2002 season, which would prove to be his last in professional baseball.

Due to his small size, Borrego elected to retire from baseball prior to the 2003 season, but was immediately kept on by the Twins organization as a coach, working in the Venezuelan Summer League from 2003 to 2008. He became a manager in 2009, in the Dominican Summer League, and the year after began managing in the Gulf Coast League, where he spent seven years. The year after, he began coaching in Minor League Baseball (MiLB), coaching for multiple Twins minor league teams, most notably managing the Wichita Wind Surge from their conception in 2021 until 2024, leading them to two league championships.

In December 2024, it was announced Borrego would become the first base coach for the Minnesota Twins, partially due to his experience working with Twins prospects. Ahead of the 2026 season, he transitioned to third base coach, where he has received praise from Twins manager Derek Shelton for his aggressive sends.
