= Manny Parra =

American baseball player (born 1982)

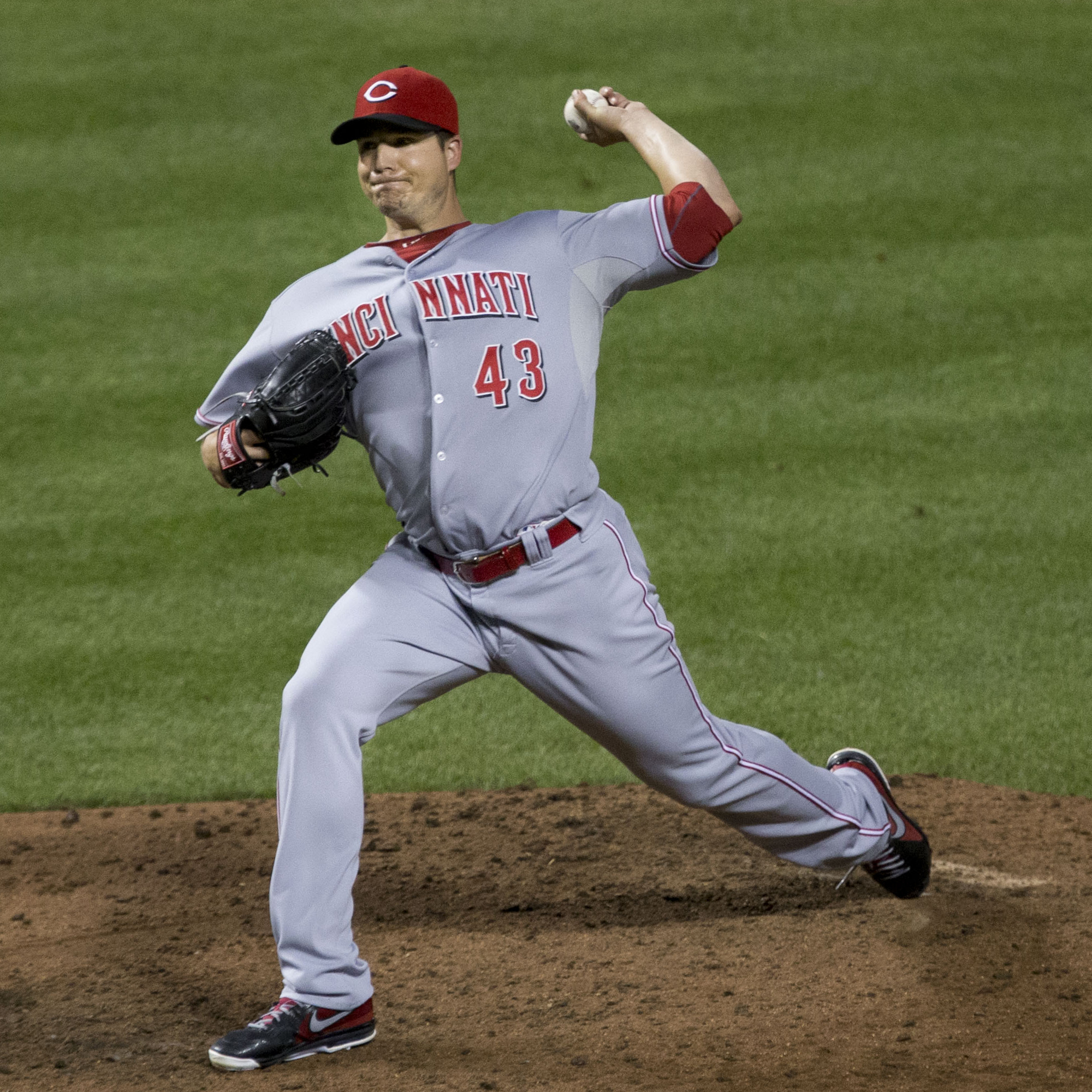
- Parra pitching for the Cincinnati Reds in 2014
- Pitcher
- Born: October 30, 1982 (age 44); Carmichael, California, U.S.
- Batted: Left Threw: Left

MLB debut
- July 20, 2007, for the Milwaukee Brewers

Last MLB appearance
- October 1, 2015, for the Cincinnati Reds

MLB statistics
- Win–loss record: 29–41
- Earned run average: 4.90
- Strikeouts: 592
- Stats at Baseball Reference

Teams
- Milwaukee Brewers (2007–2010, 2012); Cincinnati Reds (2013–2015)

Manuel Alex Parra (born October 30, 1982) is an American former professional baseball pitcher. He played in Major League Baseball (MLB) for the Milwaukee Brewers and Cincinnati Reds.

== Early life ==
Parra graduated from Casa Roble High School in Orangevale, California, in 2000. In addition to pitching in high school, he also played first base. He graduated from American River College in Sacramento, California, in 2002. He was selected as the National Junior College Player of the Year by Baseball America that season. In 14 games, he had a 7–2 win–loss record with a 2.02 earned run average (ERA).

== Professional career ==
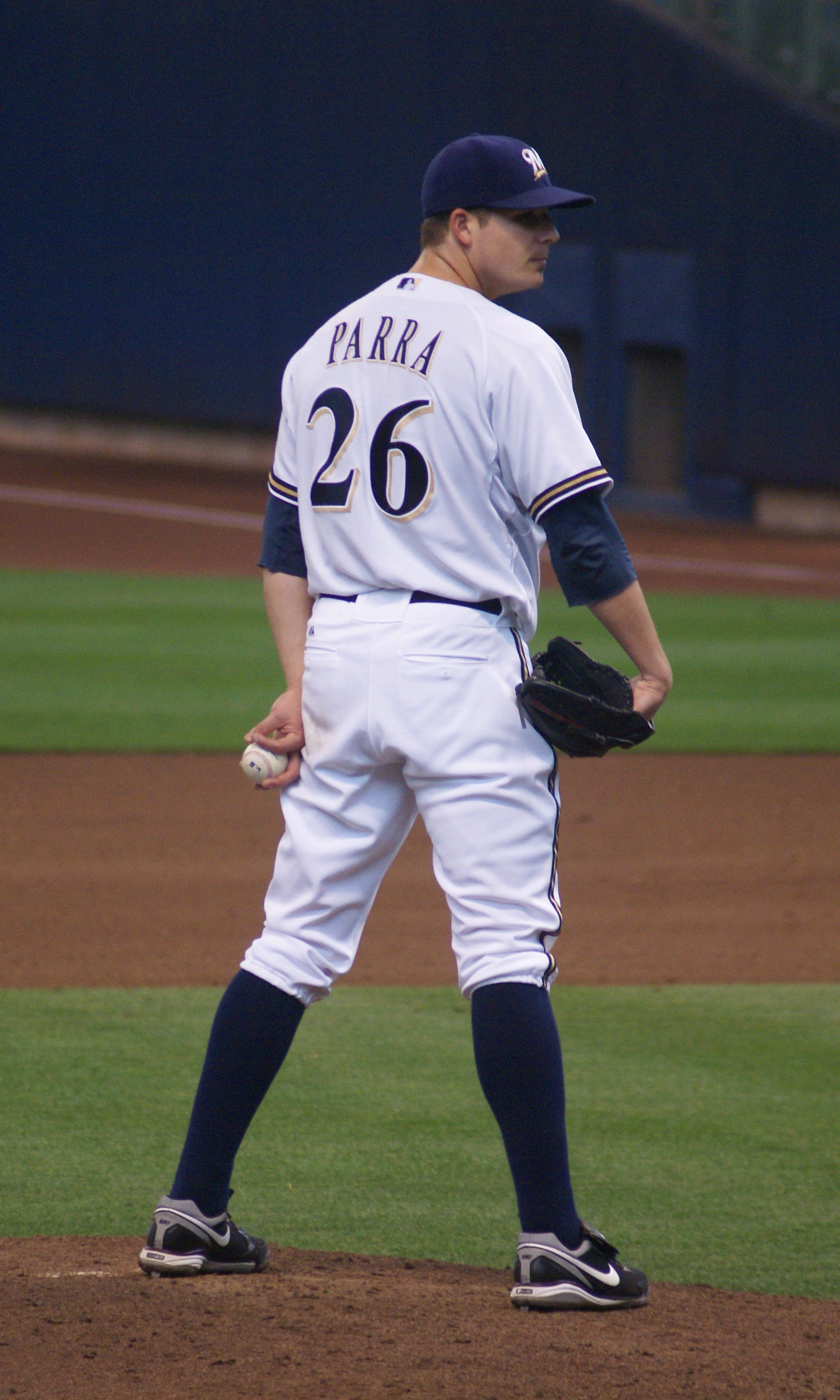
Parra during his tenure with the Milwaukee Brewers in 2009

=== Milwaukee Brewers ===
Parra was drafted by the Milwaukee Brewers in the 26th round of the 2001 Major League Baseball draft. Shoulder problems resulted in a slower-than-expected advancement through the Brewers' minor league system for the draft-and-follow prospect. They had also hindered the left-hander's ability to pitch deep into games, having only gone over 100 innings pitched in his 2003 season at Class A Beloit. After beginning the 2006 season at Class A-Advanced Brevard County, he was promoted to Double-A Huntsville in August and selected to participate in that year's Arizona Fall League. Through 5 years of professional baseball, Parra had a career minor league record of 28–15 with a 3.22 ERA. He had pitched just two complete games during this period. At the time, Parra relied primarily on his four-seam fastball but also utilized a curveball and split-finger fastball.

Parra attended spring training with the Brewers in 2007 where he allowed no runs or hits while striking out 3 batters in 3 1/3 innings over 4 relief appearances. He was assigned to Double-A Huntsville to begin the 2007 season. After 13 starts, he had a win–loss record of 7–3 with a Southern League-leading 2.68 ERA. He was promoted to the Triple-A Nashville Sounds in mid-June to replace ace pitcher Yovani Gallardo who had been called up to Milwaukee. Parra made his first career Triple-A start on June 20—a 3–0 loss in which he allowed 2 runs on 7 hits and 4 walks while striking out 6 batters in 6 innings.

On June 25, 2007, Parra's second Triple-A start, he pitched a perfect game against the Round Rock Express. This was only the third nine-inning perfect game in Pacific Coast League history. In all, Parra stuck out 11 batters, achieving strikeouts in every inning except the eighth. Six ground outs and 10 fly outs accounted for Parra's other outs in the game. Seventy-seven of his 107 pitches were counted as strikes.

After just two more Triple-A starts, Parra made his major league debut on July 20 against the San Francisco Giants. Coming on in relief, he surrendered no runs over 1 1/3 innings and struck out 3 of the 4 batters he faced. Parra appeared in eight more games, including two starts, before breaking his left thumb during a bunt attempt in a game on August 30, which forced him to finish the season on the disabled list. Parra ended the campaign with an 0–1 record and a 3.76 ERA in 9 games with the Brewers.

He returned to the mound at the beginning of the 2008 season, in which he had a 10–8 record. Despite throwing 17 wild pitches in that season, tying for the major league lead, his split-finger fastball was the most effective among major league starting pitchers. He remained in Milwaukee's starting rotation through 2009.

Parra was moved to the bullpen in 2010. On June 6 of that year, Parra became the 52nd major league pitcher to strike out four batters in an inning, doing so against the St. Louis Cardinals. Problems with his back and the necessary surgical removal of a bone spur in his throwing elbow resulting in him missing the entire 2011 season. He continued in a relief role for the Brewers in 2012, but was non-tendered at the season's end and became a free agent. After five years with Milwaukee, Parra held a 26–33 record with a 5.12 ERA in 74 starts and 98 relief appearances.

=== Cincinnati Reds ===
On February 1, 2013, the Cincinnati Reds signed Parra to a one-year contract. He pitched in the bullpen with the Reds as a middle reliever. On April 26, he was placed on the disabled list with a strained pectoral muscle, and missed almost a month. From June 11 to July 28, he had a 19-game, 15.1 inning scoreless streak. In a year where he filled in for the high expectations of Sean Marshall, he shined, going 2–3 with a 3.33 ERA and 16 holds, striking out 56 in 46 innings (57 games). He entered June with a 6.23 ERA, and starting on June 11 to the end of the season, he had a 1.78 ERA in 35.1 innings.

On November 27, 2013, Parra agreed to a two-year, $5.5 million contract with Cincinnati. In 150 relief appearances from 2013 to 2015, Parra accumulated a 3–8 record with a 3.91 ERA before reaching free agency after the 2015 season.

=== Chicago Cubs ===
On February 22, 2016, Parra signed a minor league contract with the Chicago Cubs that included incentives potentially bringing the total value of the deal to US$2.7 million if he made the 40-man roster. Despite a strong showing in spring training, he was released by the Cubs and resigned to a new minor league contract on the same day on March 29. Ultimately, Parra missed the entire 2016 season following Tommy John surgery in early April. On January 27, 2017, he was signed to a minor league contract and pitched out of the bullpen on 11 occasions for Chicago's Triple-A Iowa Cubs. He was released on April 27. He re-signed a new minor league contract with the Cubs on May 8. He was released on June 23 with an ERA of 14.09.

=== Bridgeport Bluefish ===
On July 31, 2017, Parra signed with the Bridgeport Bluefish of the independent Atlantic League where he played for the remainder of the season. In 9 starts 46 innings he struggled going 3-4 with a 5.87 ERA with 43 strikeouts while also throwing 1 complete game.

=== San Francisco Giants ===
Though Parra was selected by the Long Island Ducks in the Bridgeport Bluefish dispersal draft, he later signed a minor league deal with the San Francisco Giants on February 27, 2018. He made 45 relief outings for the Triple-A Sacramento River Cats, recording a 4.28 ERA with 53 strikeouts across 54 2/3 innings pitched. Parra elected free agency following the season on November 2.

=== Leones de Yucatán ===
On June 1, 2019, Parra signed with the Leones de Yucatán of the Mexican League. In 23 games (1 start) 27 innings he went 0-2 with a 3.67 ERA and 23 strikeouts.

Parra did not play in a game in 2020 due to the cancellation of the Mexican League season because of the COVID-19 pandemic.

=== Mariachis de Guadalajara ===
On March 11, 2021, Parra was loaned to the Mariachis de Guadalajara of the Mexican League, a new expansion team. In 8 relief appearances, Parra posted a 3.18 ERA and 5 strikeouts over 5.2 innings pitched.

=== Leones de Yucatán (second stint) ===
On July 19, 2021, Parra was returned to the Leones de Yucatán of the Mexican League. He made 6 appearances for Yucatán, registering a 1–1 record and 3.27 ERA with 5 strikeouts in 11.0 innings pitched.

Parra retired from professional baseball in February 2022.

== See also ==
- List of Major League Baseball single-inning strikeout leaders
