= 2010 San Diego Padres season =

2010 San Diego Padres
- League: National League
- Division: West
- Ballpark: Petco Park
- City: San Diego, California
- Record: 90–72 (.556)
- Divisional place: 2nd
- Owners: Jeff Moorad
- General managers: Jed Hoyer
- Managers: Bud Black
- Television: 4SD (Dick Enberg, Mark Grant, Tony Gwynn, Mark Neely); Cablemas (Spanish)
- Radio: XX Sports Radio (Ted Leitner, Jerry Coleman, Andy Masur); XEMO-AM (Spanish) (Eduardo Otega, Juan Angel Avila)

The 2010 San Diego Padres season was the 42nd season in franchise history. On August 25, the Padres had a 6 1/2-game lead over the second-place San Francisco Giants, but ended up missing the playoffs as the Giants passed them in September. This was the last winning season the Padres would have until 2020, as well as their last 90 win season until 2024.

== Regular season ==
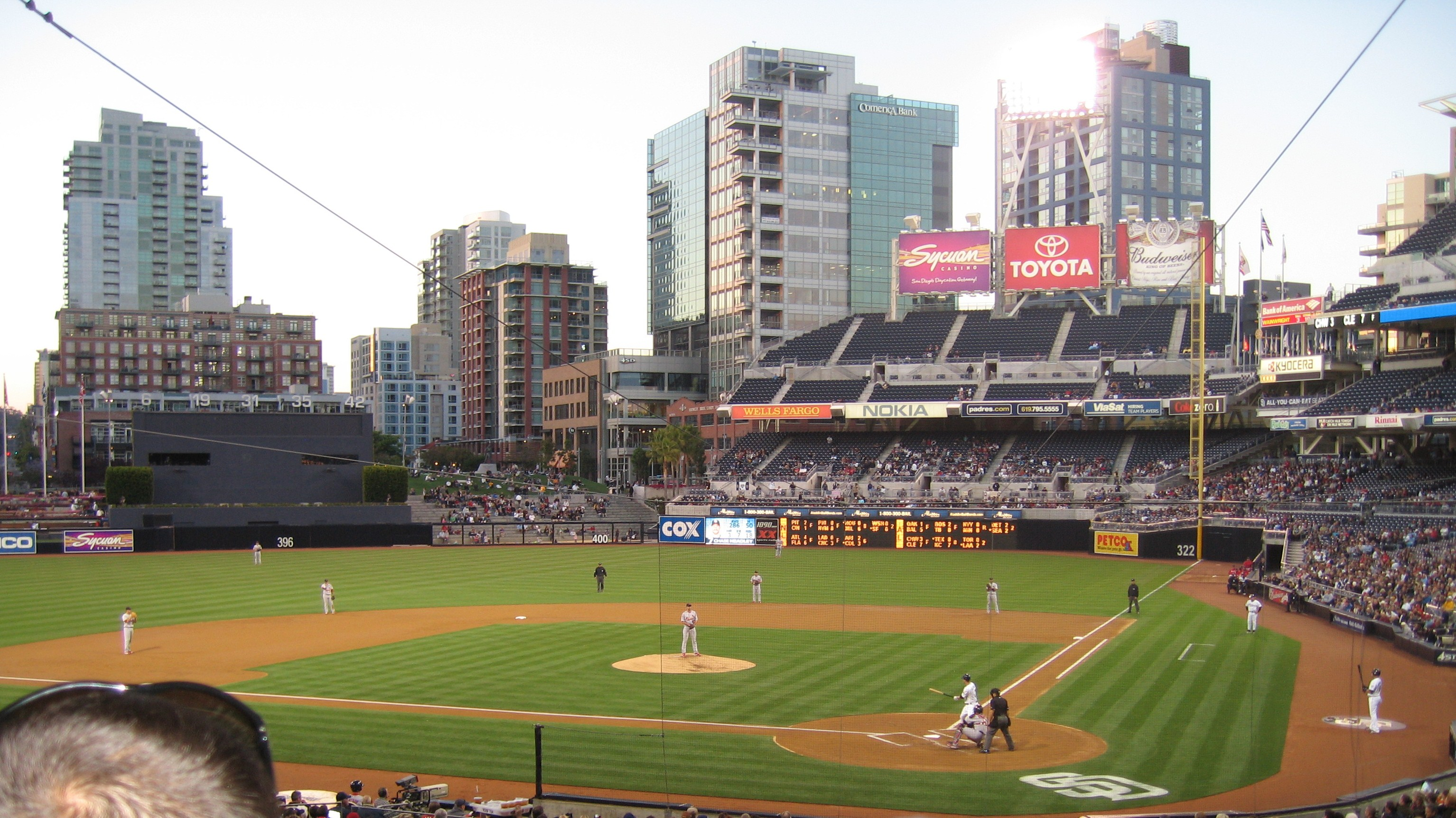
Cardinals at Padres, May 25

Many preseason predictions picked the Padres to finish the season in last place in the NL West.

On April 12, 2010, (Padres home opener) the Padres scored 17 runs—including a ten run 4th inning, making it the most runs in one half inning of baseball in Petco Park's history—against the Atlanta Braves as they went on to win 17–2. In the Padres' 1–0 win over the San Francisco Giants on April 20, San Diego won despite San Francisco's Jonathan Sánchez and Sergio Romo limiting them to just one hit, one of the very rare occasions that a team won with just one hit.

On May 13, Mat Latos threw a one hitter in a 1–0 win over the Giants.

On May 29, the Giants signed free agent outfielder Pat Burrell. Padres CEO Jeff Moorad, Burrell's friend and his former agent, would later say he regretted not recruiting Burrell to the Padres.

On May 31, the Padres played 51 games and were 2 games ahead of the Los Angeles Dodgers. They had one of the highest winning percentages in the National League despite having poor attendance and one of the worst payrolls in Major League Baseball. The Padres had one of the lowest ERA in the National League.

On June 11, the Padres had 36 wins and 25 losses. They were tied with the Los Angeles Dodgers in first place.

On June 14, in the Padres' 6–3 loss to the Toronto Blue Jays, an earthquake shook Petco Park. Many fans and Cito Gaston, the Blue Jays' manager, felt the 5.7 M_{w} earthquake, but most of the players did not feel it. Gaston reported that he felt the dugout move side from side a little.

On June 23, the Padres won the first two games in the series against the Tampa Bay Rays. They placed 2 1/2 games ahead of the San Francisco Giants for first place.

On June 25, the Padres won the first game of a three-game series against the Florida Marlins, giving them 43 wins and 30 losses. In contrast, the Padres record after 73 games in 2009 was 32 wins with 41 losses. There were constant rumors and talks about the possible trade of All-Star first baseman and Gold Glove winner Adrián González, but he remained in San Diego throughout the season.

On August 18, the Padres moved 6 games ahead of the San Francisco Giants giving them their biggest division lead of the season

On August 23, the Giants acquired outfielder Cody Ross off waivers from the Florida Marlins to block him from going to the Padres.

On August 25, the Padres were 76–49 and in first place with a 6 1/2 game lead. On August 26, the Padres started a 10-game losing streak by losing to the Arizona Diamondbacks 5–11. The losing streak went into the month of September and ended on September 6 when they beat the Los Angeles Dodgers 4–2.

On September 26, the Padres (87–67) had a 1/2-game lead over the Giants (87–68).

On September 30, the Padres fell 3 games behind the San Francisco Giants after losing 3 out of 4 games to the Chicago Cubs, putting them on the brink of elimination. With a 3–0 loss on October 3, the final game of the season, with the Braves beating the Phillies, the Padres were officially eliminated from playoff contention and the Giants won the division, while the Braves won the wild card spot. The Padres led the NL West for 148 days in 2010. They set team records for the fewest errors (72) and highest fielding percentage (.988) in a season.

=== Season standings ===
==== National League West ====
NL West
Team	W	L	Pct.	GB	Home	Road
San Francisco Giants	92	70	.568	—	49‍–‍32	43‍–‍38
San Diego Padres	90	72	.556	2	45‍–‍36	45‍–‍36
Colorado Rockies	83	79	.512	9	52‍–‍29	31‍–‍50
Los Angeles Dodgers	80	82	.494	12	45‍–‍36	35‍–‍46
Arizona Diamondbacks	65	97	.401	27	40‍–‍41	25‍–‍56

==== National League Wild Card ====
Division leaders
Team	W	L	Pct.
Philadelphia Phillies	97	65	.599
San Francisco Giants	92	70	.568
Cincinnati Reds	91	71	.562

Wild Card team (Top team qualifies for postseason)
Team	W	L	Pct.	GB
Atlanta Braves	91	71	.562	—
San Diego Padres	90	72	.556	1
St. Louis Cardinals	86	76	.531	5
Colorado Rockies	83	79	.512	8
Florida Marlins	80	82	.494	11
Los Angeles Dodgers	80	82	.494	11
New York Mets	79	83	.488	12
Milwaukee Brewers	77	85	.475	14
Houston Astros	76	86	.469	15
Chicago Cubs	75	87	.463	16
Washington Nationals	69	93	.426	22
Arizona Diamondbacks	65	97	.401	26
Pittsburgh Pirates	57	105	.352	34

==== Record vs. opponents ====
2010 National League record Source: MLB Standings Grid – 2010
Team	AZ	ATL	CHC	CIN	COL	FLA	HOU	LAD	MIL	NYM	PHI	PIT	SD	SF	STL	WSH	AL
Arizona	–	3–4	1–6	2–5	9–9	3–3	4–3	5–13	3–4	5–1	2–4	2–4	8–10	5–13	4–5	3–4	6–9
Atlanta	4–3	–	4–2	3–2	2–4	11–7	5–1	5–3	5–2	11–7	8–10	6–3	4–2	4–3	2–6	8–10	9–6
Chicago	6–1	2–4	–	4–12	2–3	4–2	7–11	3–4	9–6	3–4	4–2	5–10	3–5	2–5	9–6	4–2	8–10
Cincinnati	5–2	2–3	12–4	–	2–5	5–2	10–5	5–4	11–3	4–2	2–5	10–6	2–4	3–4	6–12	4–3	8–7
Colorado	9–9	4–2	3–2	5–2	–	3–4	2–4	7–11	5–4	3–3	1–6	3–4	12–6	9–9	3–4	5–3	9–6
Florida	3–3	7–11	2–4	2–5	4–3	–	3–3	4–2	4–4	12–6	5–13	6–2	3–6	2–5	3–2	13–5	7–8
Houston	3–4	1–5	11–7	5–10	4–2	3–3	–	2–4	8–7	3–4	4–3	11–4	2–5	2–7	10–5	4–4	3–12
Los Angeles	13–5	3–5	4–3	4–5	11–7	2–4	4–2	–	4–2	3–4	2–4	4–3	8–10	8–10	3–4	3–3	4–11
Milwaukee	4–3	2–5	6–9	3–11	4–5	4–4	7–8	2–4	–	5–2	1–5	13–5	3–4	2–5	8–7	4–2	9–6
New York	1–5	7–11	4–3	2–4	3–3	6–12	4–3	4–3	2–5	–	9–9	6–1	3–3	3–4	3–3	9–9	13–5
Philadelphia	4–2	10–8	2–4	5–2	6–1	13–5	3–4	4–2	5–1	9–9	–	2–4	5–2	3–3	4–4	12–6	10–8
Pittsburgh	4–2	3–6	10–5	6–10	4–3	2–6	4–11	3–4	5–13	1–6	4–2	–	0–6	2–4	6–9	1–5	2–13
San Diego	10–8	2–4	5–3	4–2	6–12	6–3	5–2	10–8	4–3	3–3	2–5	6–0	–	12–6	3–4	3–3	9–6
San Francisco	13–5	3–4	5–2	4–3	9–9	5–2	7–2	10–8	5–2	4–3	3–3	4–2	6–12	–	3–3	4–2	7–8
St. Louis	5–4	6–2	6–9	12–6	4–3	2–3	5–10	4–3	7–8	3–3	4–4	9–6	4–3	3–3	–	3–3	9–6
Washington	4–3	10–8	2–4	3–4	3–5	5–13	4–4	3–3	2–4	9–9	6–12	5–1	3–3	2–4	3–3	–	5–13

=== Game log ===
2010 Game Log
April (15–8)

#	Date	Opponent	Score	Win	Loss	Save	Attendance	Record	Stadium	Box	GB
1	April 5	@ Diamondbacks	6–3	Haren (1–0)	Garland (0–1)		49,192	0–1	Chase Field	L1	-1
2	April 6	@ Diamondbacks	6–3	Young (1–0)	Jackson (0–1)	Bell (1)	19,177	1–1	Chase Field	W1	-1
3	April 7	@ Diamondbacks	5–3	Boyer (1–0)	Correia (0–1)	Qualls (1)	17,673	1–2	Chase Field	L1	-2
4	April 9	@ Rockies	7–0	de la Rosa (1–0)	Richard (0–1)		49,509	1–3	Coors Field	L2	-3
5	April 10	@ Rockies	5–4	Stauffer (1–0)	Corpas (0–1)	Bell (2)	36,090	2–3	Coors Field	W1	-2
6	April 11	@ Rockies	4–2	Jiménez (2–0)	Garland (0–2)	Morales (2)	39,576	2–4	Coors Field	L1	-3
7	April 12	Braves	17–2	Correia (1–1)	Jurrjens (0–1)		42,843	3–4	Petco Park	W1	-3
8	April 14	Braves	6–1	Hanson (1–1)	Richard (0–2)		24,969	3–5	Petco Park	L1	-3½
9	April 15	Braves	6–2	Hudson (1–0)	Latos (0–1)		16,356	3–6	Petco Park	L2	-4
10	April 16	Diamondbacks	6–3	Bell (1–0)	Gutiérrez (0–1)		26,632	4–6	Petco Park	W1	-3
11	April 17	Diamondbacks	5–0	Correia (2–1)	Benson (0–1)		31,324	5–6	Petco Park	W2	-3
12	April 18	Diamondbacks	5–3	Mujica (1–0)	Heilman (0–1)	Bell (3)	20,634	6–6	Petco Park	W3	-2
13	April 19	Giants	3–2 (10)	Stauffer (2–0)	Affeldt (2–2)		17,087	7–6	Petco Park	W4	-1
14	April 20	Giants	1–0	Latos (1–1)	Sánchez (1–1)	Bell (4)	17,822	8–6	Petco Park	W5	0
15	April 21	Giants	5–2	Garland (1–2)	Wellemeyer (0–3)		14,906	9–6	Petco Park	W6	+1
16	April 23	@ Reds	10–4	Correia (3–1)	Arroyo (0–2)		15,183	10–6	Great American Ball Park	W7	+1
17	April 24	@ Reds	5–0	LeBlanc (1–0)	Cueto (0–1)		19,999	11–6	Great American Ball Park	W8	+1
18	April 25	@ Reds	5–4	Rhodes (1–1)	Adams (0–1)	Cordero (7)	17,694	11–7	Great American Ball Park	L1	+1
19	April 26	@ Marlins	10–1	Johnson (2–1)	Latos (1–2)		10,924	11–8	Sun Life Stadium	L2	0
20	April 27	@ Marlins	4–1	Garland (2–2)	Sánchez (1–2)	Bell (5)	11,613	12–8	Sun Life Stadium	W1	0
21	April 28	@ Marlins	6–4	Correia (4–1)	Robertson (2–2)	Bell (6)	16,310	13–8	Sun Life Stadium	W2	+1
22	April 29	Brewers	9–0	LeBlanc (2–0)	Davis (0–3)		16,696	14–8	Petco Park	W3	+1½
23	April 30	Brewers	3–0	Richard (1–2)	Bush (1–2)	Bell (7)	29,366	15–8	Petco Park	W4	+1½

May (16–12)

#	Date	Opponent	Score	Win	Loss	Save	Attendance	Record	Stadium	Box	GB
24	May 1	Brewers	2–1	Gallardo (3–2)	Latos (1–3)	Hoffman (4)	25,619	15–9	Petco Park	L1	+½
25	May 2	Brewers	8–0	Garland (3–2)	Wolf (2–2)		20,074	16–9	Petco Park	W1	+1½
26	May 3	Rockies	5–2	Jiménez (6–0)	Correia (4–2)		15,052	16–10	Petco Park	L1	+1
27	May 4	Rockies	3–2	Bell (2–0)	Morales (0–3)		16,329	17–10	Petco Park	W1	+1
28	May 5	Rockies	6–5	Corpas (1–1)	Stauffer (2–1)		17,121	17–11	Petco Park	L1	0
29	May 7	@ Astros	7–0	Latos (2–3)	Norris (1–4)		25,586	18–11	Minute Maid Park	W1	+½
30	May 8	@ Astros	2–1	Garland (4–2)	Paulino (0–5)	Bell (8)	27,038	19–11	Minute Maid Park	W2	+1½
31	May 9	@ Astros	4–3	Lyon (2–1)	Webb (0–1)		23,526	19–12	Minute Maid Park	L1	+½
32	May 11	@ Giants	3–2	Webb (1–1)	Zito (5–1)	Bell (9)	33,249	20–12	AT&T Park	W1	+1½
33	May 12	@ Giants	5–2	Richard (2–2)	Cain (2–2)	Bell (10)	30,924	21–12	AT&T Park	W2	+2½
34	May 13	@ Giants	1–0	Latos (3–3)	Sánchez (2–3)		32,861	22–12	AT&T Park	W3	+3½
35	May 14	Dodgers	4–3	Weaver (2–1)	Gregerson (0–1)	Broxton (5)	42,056	22–13	Petco Park	L1	+2½
36	May 15	Dodgers	4–1	Kershaw (3–2)	Correia (4–3)	Broxton (6)	42,436	22–14	Petco Park	L2	+1½
37	May 16	Dodgers	1–0	Billingsley (4–2)	LeBlanc (2–1)	Broxton (7)	42,327	22–15	Petco Park	L3	+½
38	May 17	Giants	3–1	Richard (3–2)	Cain (2–3)	Bell (11)	20,558	23–15	Petco Park	W1	+1½
39	May 18	Giants	7–6 (12)	Runzler (2–0)	Ramos (0–1)	Wilson (10)	19,565	23–16	Petco Park	L1	+½
40	May 19	@ Dodgers	10–5	Garland (5–2)	Ortiz (1–2)		40,138	24–16	Dodger Stadium	W1	+1½
41	May 20	@ Dodgers	4–1	Kershaw (4–2)	Correia (4–4)	Broxton (8)	38,856	24–17	Dodger Stadium	L1	+1
42	May 21	@ Mariners	15–8	Lee (2–2)	LeBlanc (2–2)		24,139	24–18	Safeco Field	L2	0
43	May 22	@ Mariners	2–1	Richard (4–2)	Snell (0–3)	Bell (12)	28,670	25–18	Safeco Field	W1	0
44	May 23	@ Mariners	8–1	Latos (4–3)	Hernández (2–4)		33,315	26–18	Safeco Field	W2	+1
45	May 25	Cardinals	1–0	Garland (6–2)	Wainwright (6–3)	Bell (13)	18,236	27–18	Petco Park	W3	+2
46	May 26	Cardinals	2–1 (13)	Mujica (2–0)	Boggs (0–2)		19,752	28–18	Petco Park	W4	+2
47	May 27	Cardinals	8–3	Walters (1–0)	LeBlanc (2–3)		20,583	28–19	Petco Park	L1	+2
48	May 28	Nationals	5–3	Lannan (2–2)	Richard (4–3)	Capps (17)	23,468	28–20	Petco Park	L2	+1
49	May 29	Nationals	4–2	Latos (5–3)	Martin (0–1)	Bell (14)	25,956	29–20	Petco Park	W1	+2
50	May 30	Nationals	3–2	Gregerson (1–1)	Burnett (0–3)		28,591	30–20	Petco Park	W2	+2
51	May 31	Mets	18–6	Correia (5–4)	Takahashi (4–2)		20,023	31–20	Petco Park	W3	+2

June (15–12)

#	Date	Opponent	Score	Win	Loss	Save	Attendance	Record	Stadium	Box	GB
52	June 1	Mets	4–2	Pelfrey (8–1)	LeBlanc (2–4)	Rodríguez (10)	17,393	31–21	Petco Park	L1	+1
53	June 2	Mets	5–1 (11)	Webb (2–1)	Valdés (2–2)		15.880	32–21	Petco Park	W1	+1
54	June 4	@ Phillies	3–2	Halladay (8–3)	Latos (5–4)	Lidge (2)	45,080	32–22	Citizens Bank Park	L1	+½
55	June 5	@ Phillies	6–2	Moyer (6–5)	Garland (6–3)		45,353	32–23	Citizens Bank Park	L2	+½
56	June 6	@ Phillies	6–5 (10)	Adams (1–1)	Báez (2–2)	Bell (15)	44,852	33–23	Citizens Bank Park	W1	+½
57	June 7	@ Phillies	3–1	LeBlanc (3–4)	Hamels (5–5)	Bell (16)	45,398	34–23	Citizens Bank Park	W2	+½
58	June 8	@ Mets	2–1 (11)	Dessens (1–1)	Mujica (2–1)		30,086	34–24	Citi Field	L1	-½
	June 9	@ Mets	Postponed (rain); Rescheduled for June 10						Citi Field		-1
59	June 10	@ Mets	4–2	Latos (6–4)	Santana (4–3)	Bell (17)	32,365	35–24	Citi Field	W1	-½
60	June 10	@ Mets	3–0	Niese (3–2)	Garland (6–4)		28,072	35–25	Citi Field	L1	-1
61	June 11	Mariners	4–3	Thatcher (1–0)	Aardsma (0–4)		20,049	36–25	Petco Park	W1	0
62	June 12	Mariners	7–1	LeBlanc (4–4)	Lee (4–3)		30,019	37–25	Petco Park	W2	+1
63	June 13	Mariners	4–2	Hernández (4–5)	Gregerson (1–2)	Aardsma (13)	23,429	37–26	Petco Park	L1	+1
64	June 14	Blue Jays	6–3	Marcum (6–3)	Garland (6–5)	Gregg (16)	16,542	37–27	Petco Park	L2	+½
65	June 15	Blue Jays	8–2	Latos (7–4)	Cecil (7–3)		15,266	38–27	Petco Park	W1	+½
66	June 16	Blue Jays	7–1	Romero (6–3)	Correia (5–5)		16,050	38–28	Petco Park	L1	-½
67	June 18	Orioles	3–2	Bell (3–0)	Hernandez (2–6)		25,167	39–28	Petco Park	W1	+1
68	June 19	Orioles	5–4	Millwood (1–8)	Richard (4–4)	Simón (7)	28,138	39–29	Petco Park	L1	+1
69	June 20	Orioles	9–4	Garland (7–5)	Arrieta (2–1)		28,029	40–29	Petco Park	W1	+1½
70	June 22	@ Rays	2–1	Latos (8–4)	Davis (5–8)	Bell (18)	14,650	41–29	Tropicana Field	W2	+1½
71	June 23	@ Rays	5–4	Gregerson (2–2)	Shields (6–7)	Bell (19)	15,809	42–29	Tropicana Field	W3	+2½
72	June 24	@ Rays	5–3	Garza (8–5)	LeBlanc (4–5)	Soriano (17)	21,877	42–30	Tropicana Field	L1	+2½
73	June 25	@ Marlins	3–0	Richard (5–4)	Volstad (4–7)	Bell (20)	16,718	43–30	Sun Life Stadium	W1	+2½
74	June 26	@ Marlins	2–1	Garland (8–5)	Johnson (8–3)	Bell (21)	22,495	44–30	Sun Life Stadium	W2	+3½
75	June 27	@ Marlins	4–2	Webb (3–1)	Sanches (0–1)	Gregerson (1)	16,044	45–30	Sun Life Stadium	W3	+4½
76	June 28	Rockies	10–6	Jiménez (14–1)	Correia (5–6)		21,018	45–31	Petco Park	L1	+4
77	June 29	Rockies	6–3	Hammel (6–3)	LeBlanc (4–6)	Street (1)	21,196	45–32	Petco Park	L2	+3
78	June 30	Rockies	13–3	Richard (6–4)	Francis (2–3)		24,519	46–32	Petco Park	W1	+3

July (14–10)

#	Date	Opponent	Score	Win	Loss	Save	Attendance	Record	Stadium	Box	GB
79	July 1	Astros	6–3 (10)	Sampson (1–0)	Gregerson (2–3)	Lindstrom (19)	18,618	46–33	Petco Park	L1	+2½
80	July 2	Astros	3–0	Latos (9–4)	Lyon (5–2)	Bell (22)	30,691	47–33	Petco Park	W1	+1½
81	July 3	Astros	1–0	Adams (2–1)	Chacín (1–1)	Bell (23)	40,042	48–33	Petco Park	W2	+3½
82	July 4	Astros	3–2	Bell (4–0)	Lyon (5–3)		23,498	49–33	Petco Park	W3	+3½
83	July 6	@ Nationals	6–5	Capps (3–3)	Gregerson (2–4)		14,039	49–34	Nationals Park	L1	+3
84	July 7	@ Nationals	7–6	Martin (1–4)	Garland (8–6)	Capps (23)	13,762	49–35	Nationals Park	L2	+3
85	July 8	@ Nationals	7–1	Latos (10–4)	Atilano (6–6)		17,364	50–35	Nationals Park	W1	+3
86	July 9	@ Rockies	10–8	Belisle (4–3)	Gregerson (2–5)	Street (4)	36,123	50–36	Coors Field	L1	+2
87	July 10	@ Rockies	4–2	Hammel (7–3)	LeBlanc (4–7)	Street (5)	45,069	50–37	Coors Field	L2	+1
88	July 11	@ Rockies	9–7	Gregerson (3–5)	Belisle (4–4)	Bell (24)	40,460	51–37	Coors Field	W1	+2
July 13: All-Star Game (NL wins—Box)			3–1	Capps (WAS)	Hughes (NYY)	Broxton (LAD)	45,408		Angel Stadium of Anaheim	Anaheim, CA	
89	July 16	Diamondbacks	12–1	Garland (9–6)	Haren (7–8)		33,177	52–37	Petco Park	W1	+3
90	July 17	Diamondbacks	8–5	Richard (7–4)	López (5–8)	Bell (25)	40,011	53–37	Petco Park	W2	+3½
91	July 18	Diamondbacks	6–4	Correia (6–6)	Jackson (6–8)	Bell (26)	25,363	54–37	Petco Park	W3	+4
92	July 20	@ Braves	4–1	Jurrjens (3–3)	LeBlanc (4–8)	Wagner (22)	30,621	54–38	Turner Field	L1	+3
93	July 21	@ Braves	6–4 (12)	Stauffer (3–3)	Medlen (6–2)	Bell (27)	30,039	55–38	Turner Field	W1	+4
94	July 22	@ Braves	8–0	Hudson (10–5)	Richard (7–5)		26,450	55–39	Turner Field	L1	+3
95	July 23	@ Pirates	5–3	Correia (7–6)	Maholm (6–8)	Bell (28)	18,611	56–39	PNC Park	W1	+3
96	July 24	@ Pirates	9–2	Latos (11–4)	Karstens (2–6)		36,967	57–39	PNC Park	W2	+3
97	July 25	@ Pirates	6–3	LeBlanc (5–8)	Lincoln (1–4)	Bell (29)	18,800	58–39	PNC Park	W3	+3
98	July 27	Dodgers	2–0	Billingsley (9–5)	Garland (9–7)	Broxton (20)	38,428	58–40	Petco Park	L1	+2½
99	July 28	Dodgers	6–1	Richard (8–5)	Kuroda (8–9)		40,188	59–40	Petco Park	W1	+2½
100	July 29	Dodgers	3–2	Bell (5–0)	Sherrill (1–2)		42,075	60–40	Petco Park	W2	+3½
101	July 30	Marlins	4–2	Volstad (5–8)	LeBlanc (5–9)	Núñez (25)	30,478	60–41	Petco Park	L1	+2½
102	July 31	Marlins	6–3	Nolasco (12–7)	Correia (7–7)	Núñez (26)	42,072	60–42	Petco Park	L2	+1½

August (16–13)

#	Date	Opponent	Score	Win	Loss	Save	Attendance	Record	Stadium	Box	GB
103	August 1	Marlins	5–4	Garland (10–7)	Johnson (10–4)	Bell (30)	27,560	61–42	Petco Park	W1	+1½
104	August 2	@ Dodgers	10–5	Richard (9–5)	Kuroda (8–10)		40,860	62–42	Dodger Stadium	W2	+2
105	August 3	@ Dodgers	2–1	Lilly (4–8)	Latos (11–5)	Broxton (21)	38,886	62–43	Dodger Stadium	L1	+1
106	August 4	@ Dodgers	9–0	Padilla (5–3)	LeBlanc (5–10)		48,988	62–44	Dodger Stadium	L2	+1
107	August 5	@ Dodgers	5–0	Correia (8–7)	Billingsley (9–6)	Bell (31)	44,739	63–44	Dodger Stadium	W1	+2
108	August 6	@ Diamondbacks	2–1	Hudson (3–1)	Garland (10–8)	Heilman (5)	22,168	63–45	Chase Field	L1	+1
109	August 7	@ Diamondbacks	6–5	Heilman (3–3)	Gregerson (3–6)		48,946	63–46	Chase Field	L2	+1
110	August 8	@ Diamondbacks	10–1	Latos (12–5)	Saunders (7–11)		27,856	64–46	Chase Field	W1	+2
111	August 10	Pirates	4–1	LeBlanc (6–10)	Karstens (2–8)	Bell (32)	23,249	65–46	Petco Park	W2	+2½
112	August 11	Pirates	8–5	Correia (9–7)	McDonald (1–2)	Bell (33)	28,335	66–46	Petco Park	W3	+2½
113	August 12	Pirates	3–0	Garland (11–8)	Duke (5–11)	Bell (34)	25,897	67–46	Petco Park	W4	+2½
114	August 13	@ Giants	3–2	Richard (10–5)	Sánchez (8–8)	Bell (35)	42,722	68–46	AT&T Park	W5	+3½
115	August 14	@ Giants	3–2 (11)	Casilla (4–2)	Stauffer (3–2)		42,293	68–47	AT&T Park	L1	+2½
116	August 15	@ Giants	8–2	LeBlanc (7–10)	Lincecum (11–7)		42,834	69–47	AT&T Park	W1	+3½
117	August 16	@ Cubs	9–5	Correia (10–7)	Gorzelanny (6–7)		36,814	70–47	Wrigley Field	W2	+4
118	August 17	@ Cubs	1–0	Garland (12–8)	Wells (5–11)	Bell (36)	33,664	71–47	Wrigley Field	W3	+5
119	August 18	@ Cubs	5–1	Richard (11–5)	Coleman (0–1)		33,267	72–47	Wrigley Field	W4	+6
120	August 19	@ Cubs	5–3	Latos (13–5)	Marshall (6–4)	Bell (37)	30,687	73–47	Wrigley Field	W5	+6
121	August 20	@ Brewers	10–6	Capuano (2–2)	LeBlanc (7–11)		27,976	73–48	Miller Park	L1	+5
122	August 21	@ Brewers	6–5	McClendon (1–0)	Correia (10–8)	Axford (19)	40,056	73–49	Miller Park	L2	+5
123	August 22	@ Brewers	7–3	Garland (13–8)	Parra (3–10)		32,126	74–49	Miller Park	W1	+6
124	August 24	Diamondbacks	5–0	Richard (12-5)	López (5–12)		20,075	75-49	Petco Park	W2	+5½
125	August 25	Diamondbacks	9–3	LeBlanc (8–11)	Saunders (7–14)		21,966	76-49	Petco Park	W3	+6½
126	August 26	Diamondbacks	11–5	Kennedy (8–9)	Correia (10–9)		20,983	76-50	Petco Park	L1	+6
127	August 27	Phillies	3–2 (12)	Durbin (4-1)	Frieri (0-1)		34,233	76-51	Petco Park	L2	+6
128	August 28	Phillies	3–1	Blanton (6-6)	Garland (13-9)	Lidge (18)	37,424	76-52	Petco Park	L3	+6
129	August 29	Phillies	5–0	Hamels (8-10)	Richard (12-6)		30,528	76-53	Petco Park	L4	+5
130	August 30	@ Diamondbacks	7–2	Saunders (8-14)	LeBlanc (8-12)		17,829	76-54	Chase Field	L5	+5
131	August 31	@ Diamondbacks	7–4	Kennedy (9-9)	Correia (10-10)	Gutiérrez (5)	16,250	76-55	Chase Field	L6	+4

September (12–16)

#	Date	Opponent	Score	Win	Loss	Save	Attendance	Record	Stadium	Box	GB
132	September 1	@ Diamondbacks	5–2	Enright (6-2)	Gregerson (3-7)	Gutiérrez (6)	17,599	76-56	Chase Field	L7	+3
133	September 3	Rockies	4–3	Cook (5-8)	Luebke (0-1)	Street (14)	21,877	76-57	Petco Park	L8	+3
134	September 4	Rockies	6–2	Hammel (10-7)	Garland (13-10)		26,168	76-58	Petco Park	L9	+2
135	September 5	Rockies	4–2	de la Rosa (6-4)	Stauffer (3-3)	Street (15)	23,250	76-59	Petco Park	L10	+1
136	September 6	Dodgers	4–2	Adams (3-1)	Padilla (6-5)	Bell (38)	23,574	77-59	Petco Park	W1	+1
137	September 7	Dodgers	2–1	Latos (14-5)	Kershaw (11-10)	Bell (39)	20,071	78-59	Petco Park	W2	+1
138	September 8	Dodgers	4–0	Luebke (1-1)	Billingsley (11-9)	Gregerson (2)	20,851	79-59	Petco Park	W3	+2
139	September 9	Giants	7–3	Cain (11-10)	Garland (13-11)		28,456	79-60	Petco Park	L1 Archived February 20, 2019, at the Wayback Machine	+1
140	September 10	Giants	1–0	Casilla (7-2)	Richard (12-7)	Wilson (12)	33,662	79-61	Petco Park	L2 Archived February 20, 2019, at the Wayback Machine	0
141	September 11	Giants	1–0	Stauffer (4-3)	Bumgarner (5-5)	Bell (40)	41,123	80-61	Petco Park	W1 Archived February 20, 2019, at the Wayback Machine	+1
142	September 12	Giants	6–1	Lincecum (14-9)	Latos (14-6)		33,876	80-62	Petco Park	L1	0
143	September 13	@ Rockies	6–4	Frieri (1-1)	Francis (4-5)	Bell (41)	34,089	81-62	Coors Field	W1	+½
144	September 14	@ Rockies	7–6	Garland (14-11)	Hammel (10-8)	Bell (42)	40,532	82-62	Coors Field	W2	+1½
145	September 15	@ Rockies	9–6	de la Rosa (8-4)	Richard (12-8)	Street (19)	30,218	82-63	Coors Field	L1	+½
146	September 16	@ Cardinals	4–0	Westbrook (8-10)	Stauffer (4-4)		38,252	82-64	Busch Stadium	L2	-½
147	September 17	@ Cardinals	14–4	Lohse (4-7)	Latos (14-7)		37,806	82-65	Busch Stadium	L3	-½
148	September 18	@ Cardinals	8–4	Adams (4-1)	McClellan (1-4)		40,205	83-65	Busch Stadium	W1	+½
149	September 19	@ Cardinals	4–1	Wainwright (19-11)	Garland (14-12)	Franklin (25)	37,885	83-66	Busch Stadium	L1	-½
150	September 21	@ Dodgers	6–0	Richard (13-8)	Billingsley (11-11)		44,166	84-66	Dodger Stadium	W1	-½
151	September 22	@ Dodgers	3–1	Stauffer (5-4)	Lilly (8-12)	Bell (43)	33,728	85-66	Dodger Stadium	W2	+½
152	September 23	@ Dodgers	3–1	Kuroda (11-13)	Latos (14-8)	Kuo (10)	33,040	85-67	Dodger Stadium	L1	-½
153	September 24	Reds	4–3	Gregerson (4-7)	Rhodes (4-4)	Bell (44)	35,310	86-67	Petco Park	W1	-½
154	September 25	Reds	4–3	Bell (6-0)	Chapman (1-2)		35,124	87-67	Petco Park	W2	+½
155	September 26	Reds	12–2	Bailey (4-3)	Richard (13-9)		26,131	87-68	Petco Park	L1	-½
156	September 27	Cubs	1–0	Zambrano (10-6)	Stauffer (5-5)	Mármol (35)	22,739	87-69	Petco Park	L2	-1
157	September 28	Cubs	5–2	Dempster (15-11)	Latos (14-9)	Mármol (36)	27,619	87-70	Petco Park	L3	-2
158	September 29	Cubs	3–0	Young (2-0)	Wells (8-14)	Bell (45)	29,400	88-70	Petco Park	W1	-2
159	September 30	Cubs	1–0	Marshall (7-5)	Bell (6-1)	Mármol (37)	28,576	88-71	Petco Park	L1	-3

October (2–1)

#	Date	Opponent	Score	Win	Loss	Save	Attendance	Record	Stadium	Box	GB
160	October 1	@ Giants	6–4	Richard (14-9)	Cain (13-11)	Heath Bell (46)	42,409	89-71	AT&T Park	W1	-2
161	October 2	@ Giants	4–2	Stauffer (6-5)	Zito (9-14)	Heath Bell (47)	42,653	90-71	AT&T Park	W2	-1
162	October 3	@ Giants	3–0	Sánchez (13-9)	Latos (14-10)	Wilson (48)	42,822	90-72	AT&T Park	L1	-2

Final games legend
Padres Win	Padres Loss	All-Star Game	Game postponed

"GB" Legend
1st (NL West)	Not in Playoff Position	1st (NL Wild Card)	Tied for 1st (NL West)

Regular Season Schedule (calendar style)
Regular Season Schedule (sortable text)

=== Roster ===
2010 San Diego Padres
Roster
Pitchers: 37 Mike Adams; 21 Heath Bell; 29 Kevin Correia; 39 Ernesto Frieri; 63 Sean Gallagher; 27 Jon Garland; 57 Luke Gregerson; 38 Mat Latos; 49 Wade LeBlanc; 50 Cory Luebke; 45 Edward Mujica; 59 Luis Perdomo; 34 Cesar Ramos; 33 Clayton Richard; 55 Adam Russell; 46 Tim Stauffer; 54 Joe Thatcher; 58 Ryan Webb; 32 Chris Young	Catchers: 4 Nick Hundley; 11 Chris Stewart; 8 Yorvit Torrealba; Infielders: 24 Mike Baxter; 1 Everth Cabrera; 22 David Eckstein; 23 Adrián González; 15 Jerry Hairston Jr.; 7 Chase Headley; 10 Miguel Tejada; 2 Lance Zawadzki; Outfielders: 88 Kyle Blanks; 28 Aaron Cunningham; 13 Chris Denorfia; 3 Luis Durango; 18 Tony Gwynn Jr.; 12 Scott Hairston; 47 Ryan Ludwick; 14 Oscar Salazar; 16 Matt Stairs; 25 Will Venable	Manager: 20 Bud Black; Coaches: 48 Darrel Akerfelds (bullpen); 36 Darren Balsley (pitching); 30 Glenn Hoffman (third base); 5 Randy Ready (hitting); 17 Rick Renteria (first base); 9 Ted Simmons (bench)

== Player stats ==
=== Batting ===
Note: G = Games played; AB = At bats; R = Runs scored; H = Hits; 2B = Doubles; 3B = Triples; HR = Home runs; RBI = Runs batted in; AVG = Batting average; SB = Stolen bases

Player	G	AB	R	H	2B	3B	HR	RBI	AVG	SB
Yorvit Torrealba	95	325	31	88	14	0	7	37	.271	7
Adrián González	160	591	87	176	33	0	31	101	.298	0
David Eckstein	116	442	49	118	23	0	1	29	.267	8
Miguel Tejada	59	235	31	63	10	0	8	32	.268	2
Chase Headley	161	610	77	161	29	3	11	58	.264	17
Scott Hairston	104	295	34	62	10	0	10	36	.210	6
Tony Gwynn Jr.	117	289	30	59	9	3	3	20	.204	17
Will Venable	131	392	60	96	11	7	13	51	.245	29
Jerry Hairston Jr.	119	430	53	105	13	2	10	50	.244	9
Chris Denorfia	99	284	41	77	15	2	9	36	.271	8
Nick Hundley	85	273	33	68	18	2	8	43	.249	0
Everth Cabrera	76	212	22	44	6	3	1	22	.208	10
Ryan Ludwick	59	209	19	44	7	0	6	26	.211	0
Aaron Cunningham	53	132	17	38	12	1	1	15	.288	1
Oscar Salazar	85	131	19	31	4	0	3	19	.237	1
Kyle Blanks	33	102	14	16	6	1	3	15	.157	1
Matt Stairs	78	99	14	23	6	0	6	16	.232	2
Luis Durango	28	48	8	12	0	0	0	4	.250	5
Lance Zawadzki	20	35	4	7	2	0	0	1	.200	1
Mike Baxter	9	8	0	1	0	0	0	1	.125	0
Chris Stewart	2	0	0	0	0	0	0	0	----	0
Pitcher totals	162	292	22	49	8	0	1	18	.168	0
Team totals	162	5434	665	1338	236	24	132	630	.246	124

=== Pitching ===
Note: W = Wins; L = Losses; ERA = Earned run average; G = Games pitched; GS = Games started; SV = Saves; IP = Innings pitched; R = Runs allowed; ER = Earned runs allowed; BB = Walks allowed; K = Strikeouts

Player	W	L	ERA	G	GS	SV	IP	H	R	ER	BB	K
Clayton Richard	14	9	3.75	33	33	0	201.2	206	89	84	78	153
Jon Garland	14	12	3.47	33	33	0	200.0	176	86	77	87	136
Mat Latos	14	10	2.92	31	31	0	184.2	150	63	60	50	189
Wade LeBlanc	8	12	4.25	26	25	0	146.0	157	69	69	51	110
Kevin Correia	10	10	5.40	28	26	0	145.0	152	89	87	64	115
Heath Bell	6	1	1.93	67	0	47	70.0	56	17	15	28	86
Luke Gregerson	4	7	3.22	80	0	2	78.1	47	30	28	18	89
Edward Mujica	2	1	3.62	59	0	0	69.2	59	29	28	6	72
Mike Adams	4	1	1.76	70	0	0	66.2	48	14	13	23	73
Joe Thatcher	1	0	1.29	65	0	0	35.0	23	5	5	7	45
Tim Stauffer	6	5	1.85	32	7	0	82.2	65	18	17	24	61
Ryan Webb	3	1	2.90	54	0	0	59.0	64	21	19	19	44
Ernesto Frieri	1	1	1.71	33	0	0	31.2	18	7	6	17	41
Sean Gallagher	0	0	5.40	15	0	0	23.1	24	14	14	19	21
Chris Young	2	0	0.90	4	4	0	20.0	10	2	2	11	15
Cory Luebke	1	1	4.08	4	3	0	17.2	17	8	8	6	18
Adam Russell	0	0	4.02	12	0	0	15.2	14	8	7	5	18
Cesar Ramos	0	1	11.88	14	0	0	8.1	18	11	11	4	9
Luis Perdomo	0	0	9.00	1	0	0	1.0	1	1	1	0	0
Team totals	90	72	3.39	162	162	49	1456.1	1305	581	549	517	1295

== Farm system ==
Level	Team	League	Manager
AAA	Portland Beavers	Pacific Coast League	Terry Kennedy
AA	San Antonio Missions	Texas League	Doug Dascenzo
A	Lake Elsinore Storm	California League	Carlos Lezcano
A	Fort Wayne TinCaps	Midwest League	José Flores
A-Short Season	Eugene Emeralds	Northwest League	Greg Riddoch
Rookie	AZL Padres	Arizona League	Iván Cruz
