= 2010 Colorado Rockies season =

2010 Colorado Rockies
- League: National League
- Division: West
- Ballpark: Coors Field
- City: Denver, Colorado
- Record: 83–79 (.512)
- Divisional place: 3rd
- Owners: Charles & Richard Monfort
- General manager: Dan O'Dowd
- Manager: Jim Tracy
- Television: FSN Rocky Mountain; Drew Goodman, George Frazier, Jeff Huson
- Radio: KOA (English); Jack Corrigan, Jerry Schemmel; KMXA (Spanish)
- Stats: ESPN.com; Baseball Reference

The Colorado Rockies' 2010 season was the franchise's 18th in Major League Baseball. It featured the club's attempt to make the postseason in consecutive seasons for the first time in the history of the franchise. The club finished third in the National League West with a record of 83–79. In a direct reversal of their magical run in 2007, the team suffered a collapse in late September and lost 13 of their final 14 games after being 16 games above .500 on September 18.

== Offseason ==
- January 4, 2010: Miguel Olivo was signed as a free agent by the Colorado Rockies.
- January 31, 2010: Melvin Mora was signed as a free agent by the Colorado Rockies.

== Ubaldo Jiménez no-hitter ==
On April 17, 2010, in a game against the Atlanta Braves at Turner Field in Atlanta, Rockies right-hander Ubaldo Jiménez threw the first no-hitter in the 18-year history of the franchise. The Rockies won the game 4–0. While Jiménez walked six Braves batters, he struck out seven. Jiménez also contributed offensively, driving in one run.

== Regular season ==
=== Season standings ===
==== National League West ====
NL West
Team	W	L	Pct.	GB	Home	Road
San Francisco Giants	92	70	.568	—	49‍–‍32	43‍–‍38
San Diego Padres	90	72	.556	2	45‍–‍36	45‍–‍36
Colorado Rockies	83	79	.512	9	52‍–‍29	31‍–‍50
Los Angeles Dodgers	80	82	.494	12	45‍–‍36	35‍–‍46
Arizona Diamondbacks	65	97	.401	27	40‍–‍41	25‍–‍56

==== National League Wild Card ====
Division leaders
Team	W	L	Pct.
Philadelphia Phillies	97	65	.599
San Francisco Giants	92	70	.568
Cincinnati Reds	91	71	.562

Wild Card team (Top team qualifies for postseason)
Team	W	L	Pct.	GB
Atlanta Braves	91	71	.562	—
San Diego Padres	90	72	.556	1
St. Louis Cardinals	86	76	.531	5
Colorado Rockies	83	79	.512	8
Florida Marlins	80	82	.494	11
Los Angeles Dodgers	80	82	.494	11
New York Mets	79	83	.488	12
Milwaukee Brewers	77	85	.475	14
Houston Astros	76	86	.469	15
Chicago Cubs	75	87	.463	16
Washington Nationals	69	93	.426	22
Arizona Diamondbacks	65	97	.401	26
Pittsburgh Pirates	57	105	.352	34

==== Record vs. opponents ====
2010 National League record Source: MLB Standings Grid – 2010
Team	AZ	ATL	CHC	CIN	COL	FLA	HOU	LAD	MIL	NYM	PHI	PIT	SD	SF	STL	WSH	AL
Arizona	–	3–4	1–6	2–5	9–9	3–3	4–3	5–13	3–4	5–1	2–4	2–4	8–10	5–13	4–5	3–4	6–9
Atlanta	4–3	–	4–2	3–2	2–4	11–7	5–1	5–3	5–2	11–7	8–10	6–3	4–2	4–3	2–6	8–10	9–6
Chicago	6–1	2–4	–	4–12	2–3	4–2	7–11	3–4	9–6	3–4	4–2	5–10	3–5	2–5	9–6	4–2	8–10
Cincinnati	5–2	2–3	12–4	–	2–5	5–2	10–5	5–4	11–3	4–2	2–5	10–6	2–4	3–4	6–12	4–3	8–7
Colorado	9–9	4–2	3–2	5–2	–	3–4	2–4	7–11	5–4	3–3	1–6	3–4	12–6	9–9	3–4	5–3	9–6
Florida	3–3	7–11	2–4	2–5	4–3	–	3–3	4–2	4–4	12–6	5–13	6–2	3–6	2–5	3–2	13–5	7–8
Houston	3–4	1–5	11–7	5–10	4–2	3–3	–	2–4	8–7	3–4	4–3	11–4	2–5	2–7	10–5	4–4	3–12
Los Angeles	13–5	3–5	4–3	4–5	11–7	2–4	4–2	–	4–2	3–4	2–4	4–3	8–10	8–10	3–4	3–3	4–11
Milwaukee	4–3	2–5	6–9	3–11	4–5	4–4	7–8	2–4	–	5–2	1–5	13–5	3–4	2–5	8–7	4–2	9–6
New York	1–5	7–11	4–3	2–4	3–3	6–12	4–3	4–3	2–5	–	9–9	6–1	3–3	3–4	3–3	9–9	13–5
Philadelphia	4–2	10–8	2–4	5–2	6–1	13–5	3–4	4–2	5–1	9–9	–	2–4	5–2	3–3	4–4	12–6	10–8
Pittsburgh	4–2	3–6	10–5	6–10	4–3	2–6	4–11	3–4	5–13	1–6	4–2	–	0–6	2–4	6–9	1–5	2–13
San Diego	10–8	2–4	5–3	4–2	6–12	6–3	5–2	10–8	4–3	3–3	2–5	6–0	–	12–6	3–4	3–3	9–6
San Francisco	13–5	3–4	5–2	4–3	9–9	5–2	7–2	10–8	5–2	4–3	3–3	4–2	6–12	–	3–3	4–2	7–8
St. Louis	5–4	6–2	6–9	12–6	4–3	2–3	5–10	4–3	7–8	3–3	4–4	9–6	4–3	3–3	–	3–3	9–6
Washington	4–3	10–8	2–4	3–4	3–5	5–13	4–4	3–3	2–4	9–9	6–12	5–1	3–3	2–4	3–3	–	5–13

=== Transactions ===
- August 26, 2010: Brad Hawpe was released by the Colorado Rockies.
- August 31, 2010: Manny Delcarmen was traded by the Boston Red Sox to the Colorado Rockies for Chris Balcom-Miller (minors).
- September 9, 2010: Taylor Buchholz was selected off waivers by the Toronto Blue Jays from the Colorado Rockies.
- September 18, 2010: Octavio Dotel was traded by the Los Angeles Dodgers to the Colorado Rockies for a player to be named later. The Colorado Rockies sent Anthony Jackson (minors) (November 15, 2010) to the Los Angeles Dodgers to complete the trade.

=== Major League debuts ===
- Batters:
  - Chris Nelson (Jun 19)
  - Michael McKenry (Sep 8)
- Pitchers:
  - Matt Reynolds (Aug 19)
  - Samuel Deduno (Aug 27)
  - Edgmer Escalona (Sep 10)

=== Roster ===
2010 Colorado Rockies
Roster
Pitchers: 97 Joe Beimel; 34 Matt Belisle; 63 Rafael Betancourt; 35 Taylor Buchholz; 45 Jhoulys Chacín; 28 Aaron Cook; 60 Manuel Corpas; 31 Matt Daley; 47 Samuel Deduno; 29 Jorge de la Rosa; 53 Manny Delcarmen; 35 Octavio Dotel; 44 Edgmer Escalona; 53 Randy Flores; 26 Jeff Francis; 46 Jason Hammel; 38 Ubaldo Jiménez; 56 Franklin Morales; 51 Matt Reynolds; 58 Juan Rincón; 48 Esmil Rogers; 27 Greg Smith; 16 Huston Street	Catchers: 20 Chris Iannetta; 8 Michael McKenry; 21 Miguel Olivo; 39 Paul Phillips; Infielders: 12 Clint Barmes; 40 Brad Eldred; 23 Jason Giambi; 17 Todd Helton; 18 Jonathan Herrera; 6 Melvin Mora; 10 Chris Nelson; 9 Ian Stewart; 2 Troy Tulowitzki; 3 Eric Young, Jr.; Outfielders: 24 Dexter Fowler; 5 Carlos González; 11 Brad Hawpe; 15 Jay Payton; 7 Seth Smith; 19 Ryan Spilborghs	Manager: 4 Jim Tracy; Coaches: 36 Bob Apodaca (pitching); 25 Don Baylor (hitting); 43 Rich Dauer (third base); 30 Glenallen Hill (first base); 22 Tom Runnells (bench); 55 Jim Wright (bullpen)

=== Game log ===
Legend
Rockies Win	Rockies Loss	Game postponed

Please do not edit this line: OgreBot Begin-->

2010 Game Log
April (11–12)

#	Date	Opponent	Score	Win	Loss	Save	Attendance	Record
1	April 5	@ Brewers	5–3	Jiménez (1–0)	Gallardo (0–1)	Morales (1)	45,808	1–0
2	April 6	@ Brewers	7–5	Wolf (1–0)	Smith (0–1)	Hoffman (1)	37,344	1–1
3	April 7	@ Brewers	5–4	Coffey (1–0)	Cook (0–1)	Hoffman (2)	35,793	1–2
4	April 9	Padres	7–0	de la Rosa (1–0)	Richard (0–1)		49,509	2–2
5	April 10	Padres	5–4 (14)	Stauffer (1–0)	Corpas (0–1)	Bell (2)	36,090	2–3
6	April 11	Padres	4–2	Jiménez (2–0)	Garland (0–2)	Morales (2)	39,576	3–3
7	April 13	Mets	11–3	Smith (1–1)	Maine (0–1)		25,110	4–3
8	April 14	Mets	6–5 (10)	Flores (1–0)	Mejía (0–1)		26,310	5–3
9	April 15	Mets	5–0	Pelfrey (2–0)	de la Rosa (1–1)		26,195	5–4
10	April 16	@ Braves	9–5	Lowe (3–0)	Hammel (0–1)		27,692	5–5
11	April 17	@ Braves	4–0	Jiménez (3–0)	Kawakami (0–2)		32,602	6–5
12	April 18	@ Braves	4–3	O'Flaherty (1–0)	Morales (0–1)		26,546	6–6
13	April 19	@ Nationals	5–2	Stammen (1–0)	Cook (0–2)	Capps (6)	11,623	6–7
14	April 20	@ Nationals	10–4	de la Rosa (2–1)	Olsen (0–1)		15,037	7–7
15	April 21	@ Nationals	6–4	Clippard (3–0)	Betancourt (0–1)	Capps (7)	11,191	7–8
16	April 22	@ Nationals	2–0	Jiménez (4–0)	Hernández (2–1)	Morales (3)	15,518	8–8
–	April 23	Marlins	Postponed (rain/cold) Rescheduled for April 24					
17	April 24	Marlins	4–1	Nolasco (2–0)	Smith (1–2)	Núñez (4)		8–9
18	April 24	Marlins	8–1	Cook (1–2)	Robertson (2–1)		31,560	9–9
19	April 25	Marlins	8–4	de la Rosa (3–1)	Volstad (1–2)		35,883	10–9
20	April 26	Diamondbacks	5–3	Haren (3–1)	Hammel (0–2)	Qualls (5)	20,308	10–10
21	April 27	Diamondbacks	12–1	Jiménez (5–0)	Jackson (1–2)		24,112	11–10
22	April 28	Diamondbacks	12–11 (10)	Howry (1–0)	Morales (0–2)	Gutiérrez (1)	23,773	11–11
23	April 30	@ Giants	5–2	Zito (4–0)	Cook (1–3)	Affeldt (2)	37,144	11–12

May (16–12)

#	Date	Opponent	Score	Win	Loss	Save	Attendance	Record
24	May 1	@ Giants	6–1	Cain (1–1)	Rogers (0–1)		39,211	11–13
25	May 2	@ Giants	4–1	Chacín (1–0)	Sánchez (2–2)		41,831	12–13
26	May 3	@ Padres	5–2	Jiménez (6–0)	Correia (4–2)		15,052	13–13
27	May 4	@ Padres	3–2	Bell (2–0)	Morales (0–3)		16,329	13–14
28	May 5	@ Padres	6–5 (12)	Corpas (1–1)	Stauffer (2–1)		17,121	14–14
29	May 7	@ Dodgers	6–5	Weaver (1–1)	Daley (0–1)	Broxton (2)	40,567	14–15
30	May 8	@ Dodgers	8–0	Chacín (2–0)	Haeger (0–4)		42,287	15–15
31	May 9	@ Dodgers	2–0	Kershaw (2–2)	Jiménez (6–1)	Broxton (3)	40,718	15–16
32	May 10	Phillies	9–5	Báez (1–1)	Corpas (1–2)		30,403	15–17
–	May 11	Phillies	Postponed (rain/cold) Rescheduled for May 12					
33	May 12	Phillies	4–3 (10)	Beimel (1–0)	Durbin (0–1)		23,475	16–17
–	May 12	Phillies	Postponed (rain/cold) Rescheduled for September 2					
34	May 13	Nationals	14–6 (8)	Slaten (1–0)	Chacín (2–1)		20,795	16–18
–	May 14	Nationals	Postponed (rain) Rescheduled for May 15					
35	May 15	Nationals	6–2	Jiménez (7–1)	Hernández (4–2)		29,111	17–18
36	May 15	Nationals	4–3	Hammel (1–2)	Burnett (0–1)	Corpas (1)	35,258	18–18
37	May 16	Nationals	2–1	Belisle (1–0)	Clippard (7–2)	Corpas (2)	42,874	19–18
38	May 17	@ Cubs	4–2 (11)	Marshall (3–2)	Belisle (1–1)		35,760	19–19
39	May 18	@ Cubs	6–2	Silva (5–0)	Chacín (2–2)		37,029	19–20
40	May 19	@ Astros	7–3	Lyon (3–1)	Rogers (0–2)		25,200	19–21
41	May 20	@ Astros	4–0	Jiménez (8–1)	Oswalt (2–6)		25,932	20–21
42	May 21	@ Royals	9–2	Bannister (3–3)	Hammel (1–3)		24,807	20–22
43	May 22	@ Royals	3–0	Francis (1–0)	Davies (3–3)	Corpas (3)	20,907	21–22
44	May 23	@ Royals	11–7	Rogers (1–2)	Greinke (1–5)		21,876	22–22
45	May 25	Diamondbacks	3–2	Chacín (3–2)	Kennedy (3–3)	Corpas (4)	28,370	23–22
46	May 26	Diamondbacks	7–3	Jiménez (9–1)	López (2–3)		26,320	24–22
47	May 27	Diamondbacks	8–2	Hammel (2–3)	Haren (5–4)		28,353	25–22
48	May 28	Dodgers	5–4	Monasterios (2–0)	Francis (1–1)	Broxton (12)	40,162	25–23
49	May 29	Dodgers	11–3	Cook (2–3)	Kuroda (5–3)		43,261	26–23
50	May 30	Dodgers	4–3	Kershaw (5–3)	Chacín (3–3)	Broxton (13)	48,682	26–24
51	May 31	@ Giants	4–0	Jiménez (10–1)	Lincecum (5–2)		42,465	27–24

June (14–13)

#	Date	Opponent	Score	Win	Loss	Save	Attendance	Record
52	June 1	@ Giants	2–1 (11)	Betancourt (1–1)	Casilla (1–1)	Corpas (5)	31,198	28–24
53	June 2	@ Giants	4–1	Cain (4–4)	Francis (1–2)	Wilson (13)	30,697	28–25
54	June 4	@ Diamondbacks	7–6	Qualls (1–2)	Corpas (1–3)		25,290	28–26
55	June 5	@ Diamondbacks	4–3	Willis (2–2)	Chacín (3–4)	Qualls (10)	28,138	28–27
56	June 6	@ Diamondbacks	3–2	Jiménez (11–1)	López (2–4)	Corpas (6)	20,793	29–27
57	June 7	Astros	5–1	Hammel (3–3)	Rodríguez (3–8)	Corpas (7)	28,251	30–27
58	June 8	Astros	4–3	López (3–0)	Belisle (1–2)	Lindstrom (14)	26,201	30–28
59	June 9	Astros	6–2 (10)	Lyon (5–1)	Belisle (1–3)		27,114	30–29
60	June 10	Astros	5–4	Oswalt (4–8)	Chacín (3–5)	Lyon (1)	28,329	30–30
61	June 11	Blue Jays	5–3 (6)	Jiménez (12–1)	Romero (5–3)		31,101	31–30
62	June 12	Blue Jays	1–0	Hammel (4–3)	Morrow (4–5)	Corpas (8)	26,304	32–30
63	June 13	Blue Jays	10–3	Francis (2–2)	Litsch (0–1)		32,084	33–30
64	June 15	@ Twins	9–3	Pavano (7–6)	Cook (2–4)		39,812	33–31
65	June 16	@ Twins	2–1	Baker (6–5)	Chacín (3–6)	Rauch (17)	40,814	33–32
66	June 17	@ Twins	5–1	Jiménez (13–1)	Liriano (6–4)		40,741	34–32
67	June 18	Brewers	2–0	Hammel (5–3)	Parra (1–5)	Corpas (9)	32,340	35–32
68	June 19	Brewers	8–7	Belisle (2–3)	Braddock (1–1)	Betancourt (1)	39,192	36–32
69	June 20	Brewers	6–1	Hoffman (2–4)	Corpas (1–4)		46,511	36–33
70	June 22	Red Sox	2–1	Chacín (4–6)	Lester (8–3)	Belisle (1)	48,112	37–33
71	June 23	Red Sox	8–6	Corpas (2–4)	Papelbon (2–4)		48,243	38–33
72	June 24	Red Sox	13–11 (10)	Papelbon (3–4)	Street (0–1)		48,582	38–34
73	June 25	@ Angels	4–3 (11)	Belisle (3–3)	Rodríguez (0–1)	Corpas (10)	37,228	39–34
74	June 26	@ Angels	4–2	Saunders (6–8)	Cook (2–5)	Fuentes (13)	39,225	39–35
75	June 27	@ Angels	10–3	Santana (8–5)	Chacín (4–7)		37,314	39–36
76	June 28	@ Padres	10–6	Jiménez (14–1)	Correia (5–6)		21,018	40–36
77	June 29	@ Padres	6–3	Hammel (6–3)	LeBlanc (4–6)	Street (1)	21,196	41–36
78	June 30	@ Padres	13–3	Richard (6–4)	Francis (2–3)		24,519	41–37

July (13–13)

#	Date	Opponent	Score	Win	Loss	Save	Attendance	Record
79	July 1	Giants	7–3	Cook (3–5)	Bumgarner (0–2)		32,134	42–37
80	July 2	Giants	6–3	Chacín (5–7)	Lincecum (8–4)	Street (2)	48,127	43–37
81	July 3	Giants	11–8	Bautista (2–0)	Corpas (2–5)	Wilson (22)	49,271	43–38
82	July 4	Giants	4–3 (15)	Flores (2–0)	Mota (0–3)		35,274	44–38
83	July 6	Cardinals	12–9	Corpas (3–5)	Franklin (3–1)		32,922	45–38
84	July 7	Cardinals	8–7	Street (1–1)	MacLane (0–1)		33,251	46–38
85	July 8	Cardinals	4–2	Jiménez (15–1)	Carpenter (9–3)	Street (3)	37,456	47–38
86	July 9	Padres	10–8	Belisle (4–3)	Gregerson (2–5)	Street (4)	36,123	48–38
87	July 10	Padres	4–2	Hammel (7–3)	LeBlanc (4–7)	Street (5)	45,069	49–38
88	July 11	Padres	9–7	Gregerson (3–5)	Belisle (4–4)	Bell (24)	40,460	49–39
89	July 16	@ Reds	3–2	Arroyo (10–4)	Hammel (7–4)	Cordero (25)	37,188	49–40
90	July 17	@ Reds	8–1	Volquez (1–0)	de la Rosa (3–2)		41,300	49–41
91	July 18	@ Reds	1–0	Cook (4–5)	Wood (0–1)	Street (6)	25,159	50–41
92	July 19	@ Marlins	9–8	Mariñez (1–0)	Street (1–2)		16,144	50–42
93	July 20	@ Marlins	10–0	Francis (3–3)	Robertson (6–8)		16,012	51–42
94	July 21	@ Marlins	5–2	Nolasco (10–7)	Hammel (7–5)	Núñez (23)	18,332	51–43
95	July 22	@ Marlins	3–2	Núñez (4–2)	Chacín (5–8)		29,102	51–44
96	July 23	@ Phillies	6–0	Halladay (11–8)	Cook (4–6)		45,265	51–45
97	July 24	@ Phillies	10–2	Kendrick (6–4)	Jiménez (15–2)		44,781	51–46
98	July 25	@ Phillies	4–3	Madson (3–1)	Beimel (1–1)	Lidge (9)	44,726	51–47
99	July 26	@ Phillies	5–4	Blanton (4–6)	Hammel (7–6)	Lidge (10)	44,838	51–48
100	July 27	Pirates	4–2	Duke (5–9)	de la Rosa (3–3)	Dotel (21)	46,608	51–49
101	July 28	Pirates	6–2	Gallagher (1–0)	Cook (4–7)		35,128	51–50
102	July 29	Pirates	9–3	Jiménez (16–2)	Maholm (6–9)		34,158	52–50
103	July 30	Cubs	17–2	Francis (4–3)	Dempster (8–8)		40,189	53–50
104	July 31	Cubs	6–5	Street (2–2)	Marshall (6–3)		48,065	54–50

August (15–12)

#	Date	Opponent	Score	Win	Loss	Save	Attendance	Record
105	August 1	Cubs	8–7	de la Rosa (4–3)	Silva (10–5)		38,256	55–50
106	August 3	Giants	10–0	Sánchez (8–6)	Cook (4–8)		43,549	55–51
107	August 4	Giants	6–1	Jiménez (17–2)	Bumgarner (4–4)		37,278	56–51
108	August 5	@ Pirates	5–1	McDonald (1–1)	Francis (4–4)		17,131	56–52
109	August 6	@ Pirates	6–3	Hammel (8–6)	Park (2–2)	Street (7)	30,711	57–52
110	August 7	@ Pirates	8–7 (10)	Gallagher (2–0)	Street (2–3)		38,147	57–53
111	August 8	@ Pirates	8–4	Rogers (2–2)	Maholm (7–10)		22,716	58–53
112	August 10	@ Mets	1–0	Pelfrey (11–6)	Jiménez (17–3)	Rodríguez (25)	30,036	58–54
113	August 11	@ Mets	6–2	Belisle (5–4)	Takahashi (7–6)		30,554	59–54
114	August 12	@ Mets	4–0	Santana (10–6)	Hammel (8–7)		32,272	59–55
115	August 13	Brewers	5–4	Buchholz (1–0)	Loe (2–3)	Street (8)	39,142	60–55
116	August 14	Brewers	5–4 (10)	Axford (7–1)	Street (2–4)		45,264	60–56
117	August 15	Brewers	6–5	Betancourt (2–1)	Hoffman (2–6)		48,133	61–56
118	August 17	@ Dodgers	6–0	Kershaw (11–7)	Chacín (5–9)		49,540	61–57
119	August 18	@ Dodgers	3–2 (10)	Betancourt (3–1)	Dotel (2–3)	Street (9)	44,268	62–57
120	August 19	@ Dodgers	2–0	Lilly (7–8)	de la Rosa (4–4)		45,104	62–58
121	August 20	@ Diamondbacks	4–3 (10)	Heilman (4–4)	Beimel (1–2)		26,294	62–59
122	August 21	@ Diamondbacks	3–1	Enright (4–2)	Jiménez (17–4)	Gutiérrez (4)	37,631	62–60
123	August 22	@ Diamondbacks	1–0	Chacín (6–9)	Heilman (4–5)	Street (10)	30,397	63–60
124	August 23	Braves	5–4	Betancourt (4–1)	Venters (4–1)	Street (11)	34,172	64–60
125	August 24	Braves	5–2	de la Rosa (5–4)	Lowe (11–12)	Street (12)	34,485	65–60
126	August 25	Braves	12–10	Belisle (6–4)	Venters (4–2)		27,675	66–60
127	August 27	Dodgers	6–2	Broxton (5–4)	Jiménez (17–5)	Kuo (6)	41,964	66–61
128	August 28	Dodgers	5–3	Chacín (7–9)	Billingsley (10–8)		45,322	67–61
129	August 29	Dodgers	10–5	Hammel (9–7)	Lilly (8–9)		38,343	68–61
130	August 30	@ Giants	2–1	Betancourt (5–1)	Wilson (3–2)	Street (13)	30,224	69–61
131	August 31	@ Giants	5–2	Affeldt (4–3)	Belisle (6–5)	Wilson (37)	31,099	69–62

September (14–14)

#	Date	Opponent	Score	Win	Loss	Save	Attendance	Record
132	September 1	@ Giants	2–1	Lincecum (12–9)	Jiménez (17–6)	Wilson (38)	31,186	69–63
133	September 2	Phillies	12–11	Bastardo (1–0)	Delcarmen (3–3)	Lidge (19)	30,179	69–64
134	September 3	@ Padres	4–3	Cook (5–8)	Luebke (0–1)	Street (14)	21,877	70–64
135	September 4	@ Padres	6–2	Hammel (10–7)	Garland (13–10)		26,168	71–64
136	September 5	@ Padres	4–2	de la Rosa (6–4)	Stauffer (3–3)	Street (15)	23,250	72–64
137	September 6	Reds	10–5	Jiménez (18–6)	Bray (0–2)		40,237	73–64
138	September 7	Reds	4–3	Chacín (8–9)	Cueto (12–5)	Street (16)	29,164	74–64
139	September 8	Reds	9–2	Cook (6–8)	Arroyo (14–10)		28,271	75–64
140	September 9	Reds	6–5	Belisle (7–5)	Masset (3–4)	Street (17)	25,213	76–64
141	September 10	Diamondbacks	13–4	de la Rosa (7–4)	Saunders (8–15)		37,265	77–64
142	September 11	Diamondbacks	2–1	Reynolds (1–0)	López (5–14)	Street (18)	48,023	78–64
143	September 12	Diamondbacks	4–2	Street (3–4)	Demel (1–1)		41,504	79–64
144	September 13	Padres	6–4	Frieri (1–1)	Francis (4–5)	Bell (41)	34,089	79–65
145	September 14	Padres	7–6	Garland (14–11)	Hammel (10–8)	Bell (42)	40,532	79–66
146	September 15	Padres	9–6	de la Rosa (8–4)	Richard (12–8)	Street (19)	30,218	80–66
147	September 17	@ Dodgers	7–5	Jiménez (19–6)	Kuroda (10–13)	Street (20)	38,449	81–66
148	September 18	@ Dodgers	12–2	Chacín (9–9)	Ely (4–8)		40,191	82–66
149	September 19	@ Dodgers	7–6 (11)	Sherrill (2–2)	Delcarmen (3–4)		37,402	82–67
150	September 21	@ Diamondbacks	3–1	Saunders (9–16)	de la Rosa (8–5)	Gutiérrez (11)	37,460	82–68
151	September 22	@ Diamondbacks	8–4	López (7–14)	Jiménez (19–7)	Demel (2)	29,903	82–69
152	September 23	@ Diamondbacks	10–9	Carrasco (3–2)	Francis (4–6)	Gutiérrez (12)	30,093	82–70
153	September 24	Giants	2–1	Lincecum (15–10)	Chacín (9–10)	Wilson (45)	49,071	82–71
154	September 25	Giants	10–9 (10)	Street (4–4)	Wilson (3–3)		43,402	83–71
155	September 26	Giants	4–2	Cain (13–10)	de la Rosa (8–6)		32,594	83–72
156	September 27	Dodgers	3–1	Lilly (9–12)	Jiménez (19–8)	Kuo (11)	32,085	83–73
157	September 28	Dodgers	9–7	Belisario (3–1)	Dotel (3–4)	Jansen (3)	34,430	83–74
158	September 29	Dodgers	7–6	Troncoso (2–3)	Chacín (9–11)	Belisario (2)	33,296	83–75
159	September 30	@ Cardinals	6–1	Carpenter (16–9)	Hammel (10–9)		36,739	83–76

October (0–3)

#	Date	Opponent	Score	Win	Loss	Save	Attendance	Record
160	October 1	@ Cardinals	3–0	Westbrook (10–11)	de la Rosa (8–7)	Franklin (27)	36,293	83–77
161	October 2	@ Cardinals	1–0 (11)	Motte (4–2)	Morales (0–4)		39,633	83–78
162	October 3	@ Cardinals	6–1	Suppan (3–8)	Rogers (2–3)		42,409	83–79

Please do not edit this line: OgreBot End-->

== Player stats ==
= Indicates team leader

=== Batting ===
==== Starters by position ====
Note: Pos = Position; G = Games played; AB = At bats; H = Hits; Avg. = Batting average; HR = Home runs; RBI = Runs batted in

Pos	Player	G	AB	H	Avg.	HR	RBI
C	Miguel Olivo	112	394	106	.269	14	58
1B	Todd Helton	118	398	102	.256	8	37
2B	Clint Barmes	133	387	91	.235	8	50
SS	Troy Tulowitzki	122	470	148	.315	27	95
3B	Ian Stewart	121	386	99	.256	18	61
LF	Seth Smith	133	358	88	.246	17	52
CF	Dexter Fowler	132	439	114	.260	6	36
RF	Brad Hawpe	88	259	66	.255	7	37

==== Other batters ====
Note: G = Games played; AB = At bats; H = Hits; Avg. = Batting average; HR = Home runs; RBI = Runs batted in

Player	G	AB	H	Avg.	HR	RBI
Carlos González	145	587	197	.336	34	117
Ryan Spilborghs	134	341	95	.279	10	39
Melvin Mora	113	316	90	.285	7	45
Jonathan Herrera	76	222	63	.284	1	21
Chris Iannetta	61	188	37	.197	9	27
Jason Giambi	87	176	43	.244	6	35
Eric Young, Jr.	51	172	42	.244	0	8
Jay Payton	20	35	12	.343	0	1
Chris Nelson	17	25	7	.280	0	0
Brad Eldred	11	24	6	.250	1	3
Paul Phillips	12	23	5	.217	0	1
Michael McKenry	6	8	0	.000	0	0

=== Pitching ===
==== Starting pitchers ====
Note: G = Games pitched; IP = Innings pitched; W = Wins; L = Losses; ERA = Earned run average; SO = Strikeouts

Player	G	IP	W	L	ERA	SO
Ubaldo Jiménez	33	221.2	19	8	2.88	214
Jason Hammel	30	177.2	10	9	4.81	141
Jhoulys Chacín	28	137.1	9	11	3.28	138
Aaron Cook	23	127.2	6	8	5.08	62
Jorge De la Rosa	20	121.2	8	7	4.22	113
Jeff Francis	20	104.1	4	6	5.00	67
Greg Smith	8	39.0	1	2	6.23	31

==== Other pitchers ====
Note: G = Games pitched; IP = Innings pitched; W = Wins; L = Losses; ERA = Earned run average; SO = Strikeouts

Player	G	IP	W	L	ERA	SO
Esmil Rogers	28	72.0	2	3	6.13	66

==== Relief pitchers ====
Note: G = Games pitched; W = Wins; L = Losses; SV = Saves; ERA = Earned run average; SO = Strikeouts

Player	G	W	L	SV	ERA	SO
Huston Street	44	4	4	20	3.61	45
Matt Belisle	76	7	5	1	2.93	91
Rafael Betancourt	72	5	1	1	3.61	89
Joe Beimel	71	1	2	0	3.40	21
Manuel Corpas	56	3	5	10	4.62	47
Randy Flores	47	2	0	0	2.96	18
Franklin Morales	35	0	4	3	6.28	27
Matt Daley	28	0	1	0	4.21	18
Matt Reynolds	21	1	0	0	2.00	17
Manny Delcarmen	9	0	2	0	6.48	6
Octavio Dotel	8	0	1	0	5.06	6
Taylor Buchholz	7	1	0	0	4.50	9
Edgmer Escalona	5	0	0	0	1.50	2
Samuel Deduno	4	0	0	0	3.38	3
Juan Rincón	2	0	0	0	4.50	3

== Farm system ==
Level	Team	League	Manager
AAA	Colorado Springs Sky Sox	Pacific Coast League	Stu Cole
AA	Tulsa Drillers	Texas League	Ron Gideon
A	Modesto Nuts	California League	Jerry Weinstein
A	Asheville Tourists	South Atlantic League	Joe Mikulik
A-Short Season	Tri-City Dust Devils	Northwest League	Fred Ocasio
Rookie	Casper Ghosts	Pioneer League	Tony Diaz

Records
Preceded by 2009	Colorado Rockies seasons 2010	Succeeded by 2011
