= Hold (baseball) =

Baseball statistic

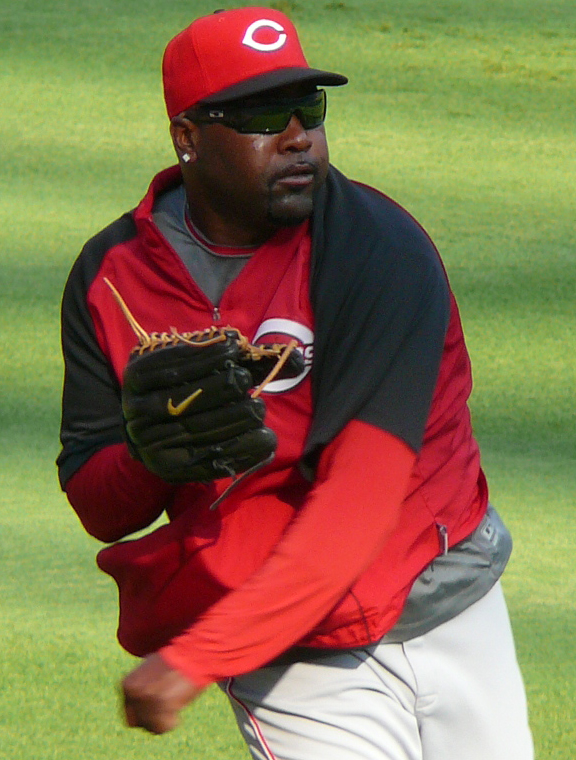
Arthur Rhodes, long-time lefty specialist reliever, is second all-time in holds.

A hold (abbreviated HLD, H or HD) is awarded to a relief pitcher who meets the following three conditions:

1. Enters the game in a save situation; that is, when all of the following three conditions apply:
  1. He appears in relief (i.e., is not the starting pitcher) when his team is leading; and
  2. He is not the winning pitcher; and
  3. He qualifies under one of the following conditions:
    1. He enters the game with a lead of no more than three runs and maintains that lead for at least one out
    2. He enters the game with the potential tying run either on base, or at bat, or on deck
2. Records at least one out;
3. Leaves the game before it has ended without his team having relinquished the lead at any point and does not record a save.

The hold is not an official Major League Baseball statistic.

== Description ==
Unlike saves, wins, and losses, more than one pitcher per team can earn a hold for a game, and pitchers on both teams can earn holds, though it is not possible for a pitcher to receive more than one hold in a given game. A pitcher can receive a hold by protecting a lead even if that lead is lost by a later pitcher after his exit.

The hold was invented in 1986 by John Dewan and Mike O'Donnell to give a statistical measure of the effectiveness of the vast majority of relief pitchers who are afforded few opportunities to close a game. While middle relievers earn their share, holds are most often credited to setup pitchers.

In 1994, PA SportsTicker created an alternate definition for a hold, removing the requirement that a pitcher needs to make an out in order to record a hold. In 2009, STATS LLC purchased PA SportsTicker, and the alternate definition is no longer in use.

While holds are not an official MLB statistic, they are increasingly visible in many box scores, including espn.com and MLB.com. Many fantasy baseball providers also include holds as an optional category that can be included in customized leagues.

== Career leaders ==
The career leaders are listed based on total holds according to MLB.com, which records the statistic only from 1999 onwards.

Stats updated through the end of the 2025 season.

Key
Rank	Ranking of the player all-time
Player	Name of the player
Holds	Career Holds
Years	The years this player played in the major leagues
†	Elected to the Baseball Hall of Fame
*	Denotes pitcher who is still active
L	Denotes pitcher who is left-handed

Rank	Player	Holds	Years
1	Tony Watson^{L}	246	2011–2021
2	Arthur Rhodes^{L}	231	1991–2011
3	Joe Smith	228	2007–2024
4	Tyler Clippard	226	2007–2022
5	Joaquín Benoit	211	2001–2017
6	David Robertson	206	2008–2025
6	Matt Thornton^{L}	206	2004–2016
8	Sergio Romo	204	2008–2022
9	Adam Ottavino	195	2010–2025
10	Luke Gregerson	189	2009–2019

Baseball statistics sites such as Baseball-Reference.com and The Baseball Cube credit holds to players in games played before 1999 based on the record of the game situation when the pitcher entered and left the game. However, the hold totals do not always agree from site to site, or with MLB.com from 1999 onward.

The following players who began their Major League careers before 1999 would be among the career leaders if MLB had recorded the statistic in games before the 1999 season. They are listed here with hold totals as calculated by Baseball-Reference.com.

Player	Holds**	Years
Mike Stanton^{L}	266	1989–2007
Arthur Rhodes^{L}	231	1991–2011
Alan Embree^{L}	194	1992–2009
Jesse Orosco^{L}	185	1979–2003
LaTroy Hawkins	184	1995–2015
Paul Assenmacher^{L}	180	1986–1999
Mike Jackson	179	1986–2004
Dan Plesac^{L}	179	1986–2003
Bob Howry	178	1998–2010
Jeff Nelson	177	1992–2006
Paul Quantrill	177	1992–2005
Mike Timlin	172	1991–2008
Buddy Groom^{L}	171	1992–2005
Steve Reed	168	1992–2005
Rick Honeycutt^{L}	165	1977–1997
Mike Myers^{L}	163	1995–2007

** as calculated by Baseball-reference.com to include years before 1999.

== Single season record ==
The single-season MLB record for holds is 41, established by Joel Peralta in 2013 pitching for the Tampa Bay Rays and equaled by Tony Watson in 2015 pitching for the Pittsburgh Pirates. Peralta surpassed the previous record of 40 holds set by Luke Gregerson in 2010 with the San Diego Padres.

== See also ==
- Baseball statistics
