= Luke Gregerson =

American baseball player (born 1984)

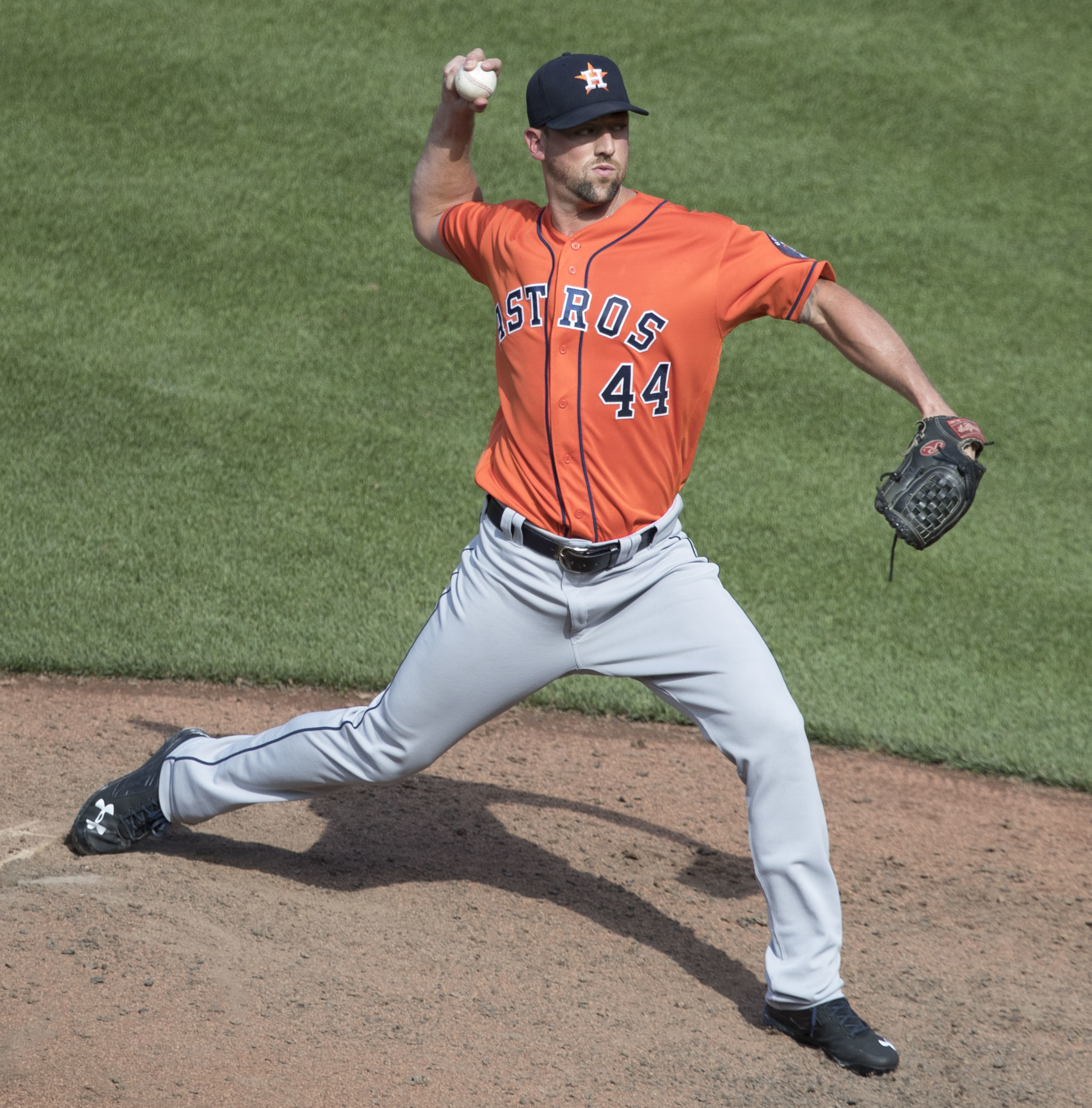
- Gregerson with the Astros in 2017
- Pitcher
- Born: May 14, 1984 (age 41); Park Ridge, Illinois, U.S.
- Batted: Left Threw: Right

MLB debut
- April 6, 2009, for the San Diego Padres

Last MLB appearance
- May 16, 2019, for the St. Louis Cardinals

MLB statistics
- Win–loss record: 35–36
- Earned run average: 3.15
- Strikeouts: 621
- Saves: 66
- Stats at Baseball Reference

Teams
- San Diego Padres (2009–2013); Oakland Athletics (2014); Houston Astros (2015–2017); St. Louis Cardinals (2018–2019)

Career highlights and awards
- World Series champion (2017)
Medals
Men's baseball
Representing United States
World Baseball Classic
Gold medal – first place	2017 Los Angeles	Team

Lucas John Gregerson (born May 14, 1984) is an American former professional baseball pitcher. He played in Major League Baseball (MLB) for the San Diego Padres, Oakland Athletics, Houston Astros, and St. Louis Cardinals. He set the major league record for holds in a single season with 40, until Joel Peralta of the Tampa Bay Rays broke the record with 41 holds in 2013. He attended J. Sterling Morton High School West in Berwyn, Illinois, and Saint Xavier University.

== Professional career ==
=== Minor leagues ===
Gregerson was drafted by the St. Louis Cardinals in the 28th round of the 2006 MLB draft out of Saint Xavier University. He spent his first professional season between the rookie-level Johnson City Cardinals and the short-season State College Spikes in 2006. He went 0–1 with a 3.86 ERA in 15 games with Johnson City and 6–1 with a 1.72 ERA in 12 games with State College.

In 2007, Gregerson split the season between the Advanced-A Palm Beach Cardinals and the Double-A Springfield Cardinals. With Palm Beach he went 3–4 with a 1.97 ERA in 53 games and with Springfield he was perfect in his only inning of work.

Gregerson spent the entire 2008 season with Double-A Springfield of the Texas League. He went 7–6 with a 3.35 ERA, 10 saves in 75 1/3 innings pitched in 57 games.

=== San Diego Padres ===
Before the 2009 season, Gregerson was traded to the San Diego Padres along with Mark Worrell for Khalil Greene.

Gregerson spent the entire season with the Padres, going 2–4 with a 3.24 ERA with one save in seven save opportunities in 72 games and striking out 93 in 75 innings. On June 16, Gregerson was placed on the 15-day disabled list for tendinitis in his right shoulder and missed about a month of the season. On September 24, 2009, he picked up his first MLB save against the Colorado Rockies.

In 2010, Gregerson solidified his role as the regular seventh-inning relief man for the Padres, appearing before Mike Adams and Heath Bell in close games. He temporarily moved to the eighth inning in late July and early August while Adams was on the disabled list. On September 23, 2010, Gregerson worked a perfect seventh to set the major league record for holds in a single season with 37. He extended the record to 40 by the end of the season. Gregerson finished the season with a 3.22 ERA and 89 strikeouts against 18 walks in 78 1/3 innings.

Gregerson again began 2011 as the Padres regular seventh-inning man. He was 2–1 with a 2.63 ERA on June 7 when he was sidelined for a month with a strained right oblique. On July 9, 2011, against the Los Angeles Dodgers, Gregerson entered the game in the ninth inning after Aaron Harang, Josh Spence, Chad Qualls, and Mike Adams combined to pitch eight innings without allowing a hit. Gregerson retired the first two hitters before a double by Juan Uribe on a one ball and two strike count broke up the no hitter. Dioner Navarro then hit a single off Gregerson to score the winning run for the Dodgers. This was the closest the Padres have come to pitching a no-hitter since Steve Arlin in 1972. When Mike Adams was traded to the Texas Rangers at the end of July, Gregerson temporarily moved into the eighth-inning role of set-up man for Bell, but in September he returned to the seventh-inning slot as Qualls took on set-up man duties. Gregerson finished the season with 16 holds and a 2.75 ERA, but there was some concern that his strikeouts dropped to 34 over 55 2/3 innings.

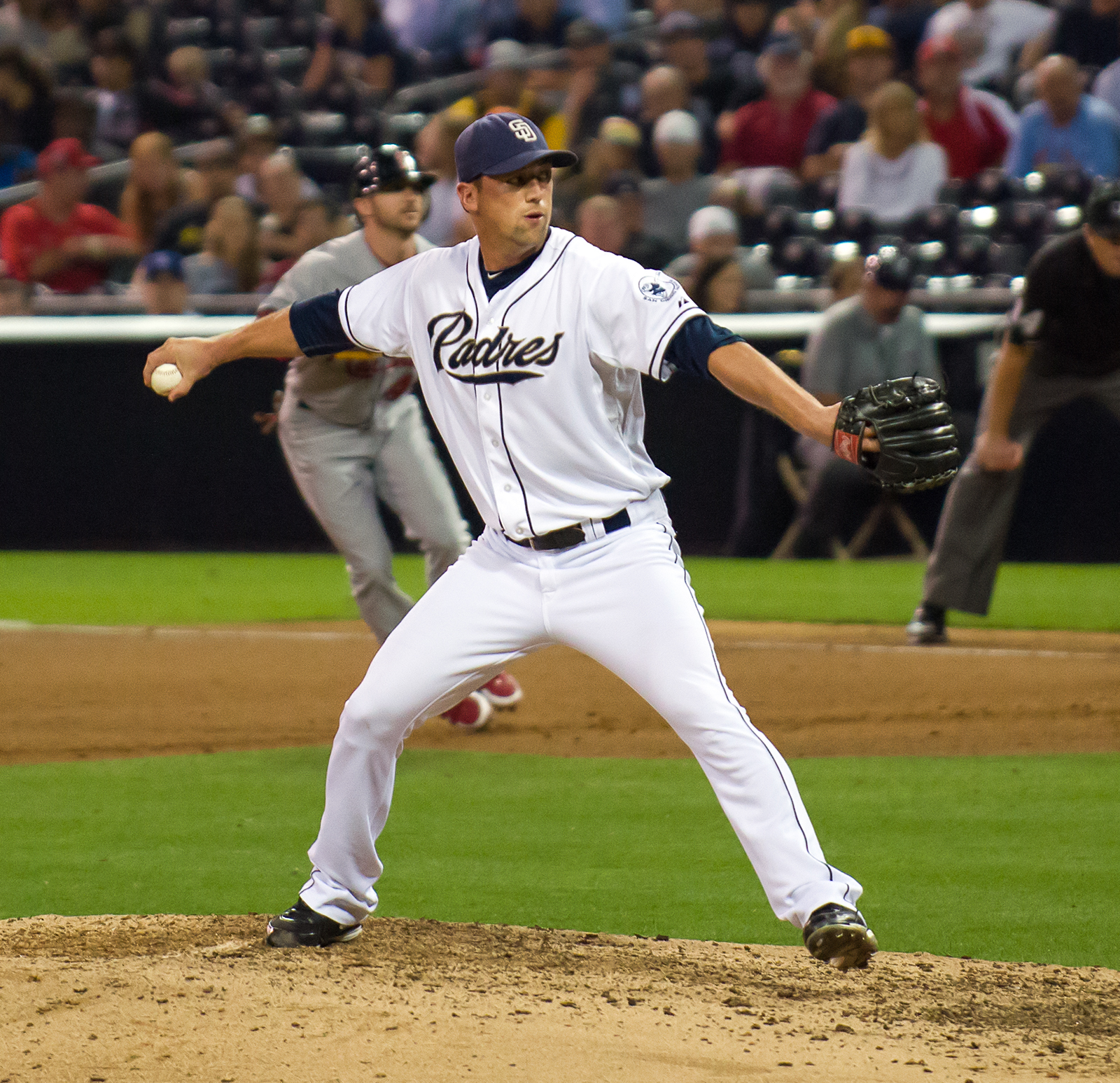
Gregerson pitching for the Padres in 2012

Gregerson had an excellent 2012 with the Padres, including a 23 scoreless inning streak in July and August. He began the year as the seventh-inning man, and then moved to the eighth-inning when Andrew Cashner was converted to starter. He moved into the closer's role in August when Huston Street was injured, picking up nine saves. Gregerson finished the season with a 2.39 ERA and 72 strikeouts versus 21 walks in 71 2/3 innings.

Gregerson retained the eighth-inning role in the Padres' 2013 season, appearing there in 49 games. He also served as closer for a short stretch in early June when Street was on the disabled list. Gregerson finished the season with a 2.71 ERA and 64 strikeouts in 66 1/3 innings.

=== Oakland Athletics ===
On December 3, 2013, Gregerson was traded to the Oakland Athletics for outfielder Seth Smith. Gregerson would start his first season with the A's as the teams set up man. However, after multiple poor April outings by A's closer Jim Johnson, Gregerson would begin sharing the A's closing duties with fellow pitcher Sean Doolittle. On April 16, Gregerson blew the save in a two-inning outing against the Los Angeles Angels of Anaheim. The Angels would go on to win 5–4. Gregerson would redeem himself on April 20, pitching a hitless inning and earning his third save of the season in a 4–1 win against the Houston Astros. On April 22, Gregerson blew another save and took the loss in a 5–4 defeat to the Texas Rangers, further clouding the future of the A's closer role. He became a free agent following the season.

=== Houston Astros ===
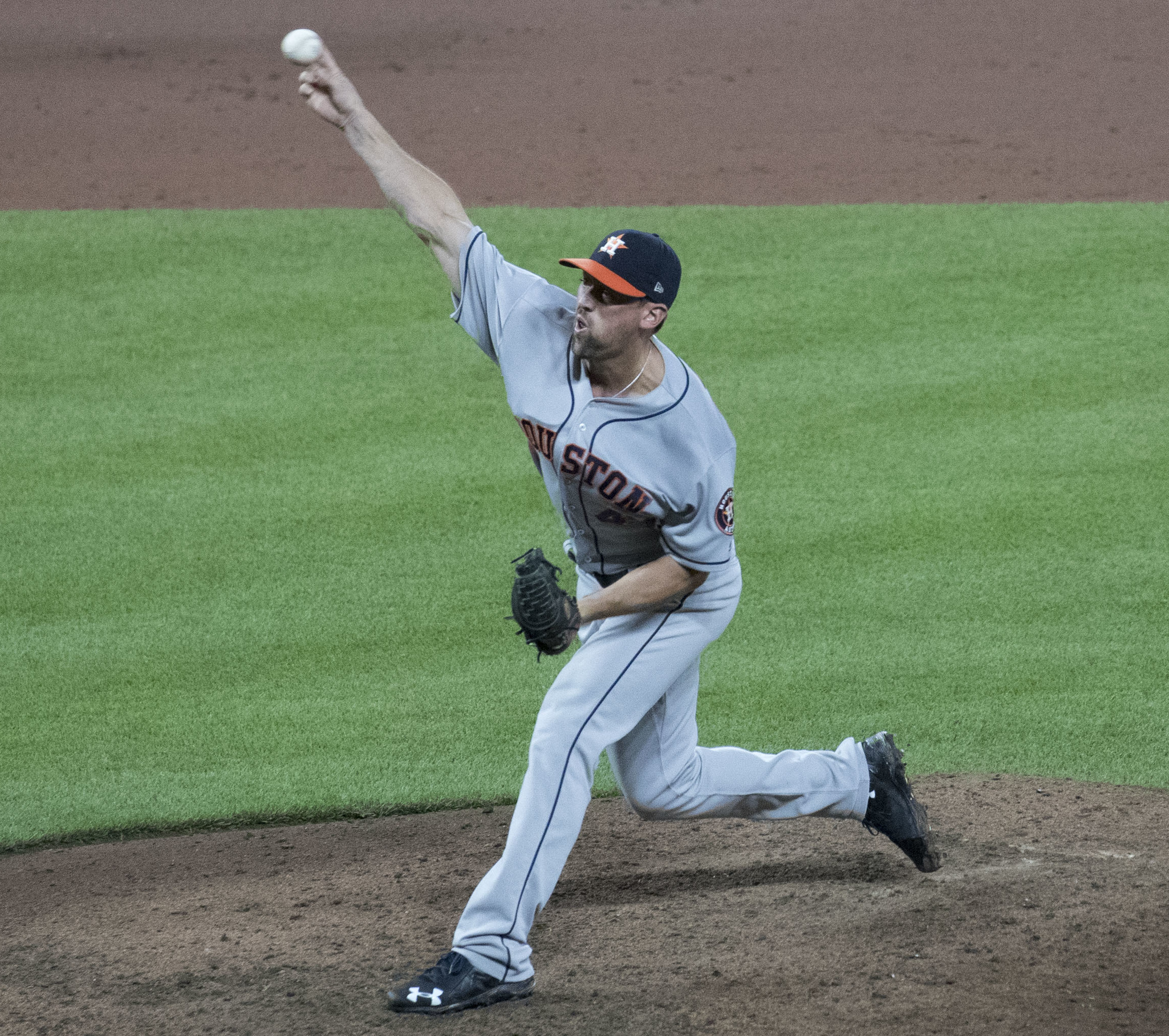
Gregerson pitching for the Astros in 2017

On December 12, 2014, Gregerson signed a three-year, $18.5 million contract with the Houston Astros. The deal was announced in conjunction with the signing of former Padres and Athletics teammate, reliever Pat Neshek, and contained incentives to boost Gregerson's potential earnings to $21 million. He registered a career-high 31 saves, ranking 10th in the AL, and 53 games finished. Gregerson also produced a 3.10 ERA, 7–3 W–L, 0.951 walks plus hits per inning pitched (WHIP), 64 games, 61 innings, and 59 strikeouts with 10 walks. He produced a 3.28 ERA in 2016. Gregerson and Alex Bregman, another Astros teammate, won the WBC participating with team USA early in 2017. Later that year, to cap the 2017 season, Gregerson and the Astros won the World Series, marking the first championship in franchise history. He became a free agent following the season.

=== St. Louis Cardinals ===
On December 13, 2017, Gregerson signed a two-year, $11 million contract with the St. Louis Cardinals. The contract includes a vesting option for the 2020 season. He began the season on the DL due to a pulled hamstring. He was activated off the disabled list but after struggling through 12 appearances, he landed back on the disabled list with right shoulder and elbow soreness. On June 12, 2018, Gregerson underwent surgery on his right knee for a torn meniscus, putting his setback even further. In 2018, Gregerson made 17 relief appearances for St. Louis, compiling a 7.11 ERA.

Gregerson began 2019 on the 10-day injured list due to right shoulder impingement. He was designated for assignment on May 17, 2019. He was released on May 20.

== International career ==
Gregerson has represented Team USA in both the 2013 and 2017 World Baseball Classic tournaments. In the 2013 tournament, he pitched two perfect innings. During the 2017 tournament he posted a 0.00 ERA with three saves in four appearances—playing a pivotal role in helping Team USA capture its first-ever WBC championship. Across his Team USA career, Gregerson has thrown six hitless innings, allowing just one baserunner.

== Coaching career ==
In July 2025, Gregerson served as a coach for the United States national under-18 baseball team's development program in Cary, North Carolina.

== See also ==
- List of Major League Baseball single-inning strikeout leaders
