= Lance Zawadzki =

American baseball player and coach (born 1985)

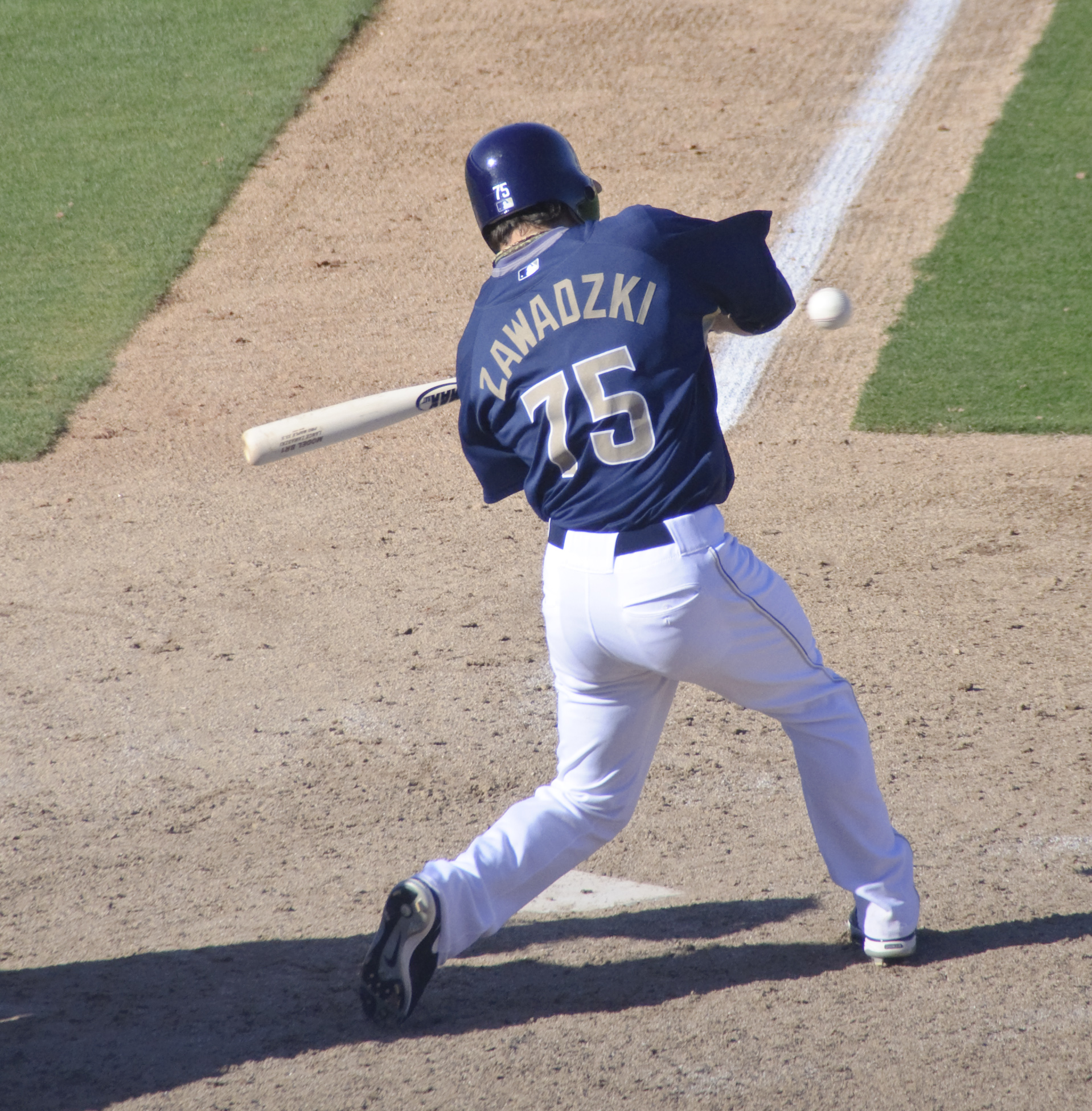
- Zawadzki with the San Diego Padres

Detroit Tigers – No. 91
- Infielder
- Born: May 26, 1985 (age 40); Framingham, Massachusetts, U.S.
- Batted: Switch Threw: Right

MLB debut
- May 2, 2010, for the San Diego Padres

Last MLB appearance
- June 20, 2010, for the San Diego Padres

MLB statistics
- Batting average: .200
- Home runs: 0
- Runs batted in: 1
- Stats at Baseball Reference

Teams
- As player: San Diego Padres (2010); As coach: Detroit Tigers (2024–present)

Lance Frederick Zawadzki (born May 26, 1985) is an American former professional baseball shortstop and current assistant hitting coach for the Detroit Tigers of Major League Baseball (MLB). He played in MLB for the San Diego Padres in 2010. Previously, he was a minor league coach in the Boston Red Sox organization.

== Amateur career ==
Zawadzki graduated from St. John's High School in Shrewsbury, Massachusetts, in 2003. He was drafted straight out of high school in the 48th round by the Montreal Expos. Choosing to go to college instead of playing in the minor leagues, he committed to attend Louisiana State University and after one year transferred to San Diego State University before the spring of 2004.

On March 11, 2004, Zawadzki became the first person to get a hit at Petco Park when he doubled off the wall as a freshman for San Diego State against Houston. It was the first game played at the stadium.

During the 2005 summer, Zawadzki played for the Wareham Gatemen in the Cape Cod Baseball League in Massachusetts alongside teammates Daniel Bard and Justin Masterson.

Following the 2006 season, Zawadzki was taken in the 15th round by the St. Louis Cardinals. He did not sign and transferred to Lee University, which played in the 2007 NAIA World Series.

== Professional career ==
=== San Diego Padres ===
Zawadzki was selected by the San Diego Padres in fourth round (147th overall) of 2007 Major League Baseball draft. In 2007, he appeared in 10 games for the rookie-level Arizona League Padres and 25 for the Low-A Eugene Emeralds, hitting a combined .305.

In 2008, Zawadzki primarily played with the Fort Wayne Wizards in the Single-A Midwest League, hitting .273 with seven home runs, 58 RBI, and 28 stolen bases across 119 appearances. In 2009, he split the season between the High-A Lake Elsinore Storm and Double-A San Antonio Missions, batting a combined .285/.369/.456 with 15 home runs, 77 RBI, and 17 stolen bases in 128 games.

On April 30, 2010, Zawadzki was selected to the 40-man roster and promoted to the major leagues for the first time. Zawadzki made his Major League debut with the Padres on May 2, against the Milwaukee Brewers and recorded his first career hit (a single) in his first at-bat, becoming the first baseball player from Lee University to play in the major leagues. He appeared in only 20 games for the Padres, primarily at second base, and hit .200. In the minor leagues that season, Zawadzki was in 35 games for San Antonio and 61 for the Triple-A Portland Beavers, hitting .225/.291/.316 with five home runs, 33 RBI, and 12 stolen bases.

=== Kansas City Royals ===
On November 5, 2010, Zawadzki was claimed off waivers by the Kansas City Royals. On December 17, he was designated for assignment following the signing of Melky Cabrera. Zawadzki cleared waivers and was sent outright to Omaha on December 22. He received an invitation to the Royals' major league camp for the 2011 spring training. However, Zawadzki spent the entirety of the season with the Triple-A Omaha Storm Chasers, where he hit .233 with eight home runs, 40 RBI, and 15 stolen bases in 91 games. Zawadzki was released by the Royals organization on October 5, 2011.

=== Los Angeles Dodgers ===
On November 4, 2011, Zawadzki signed a minor league contract with the Los Angeles Dodgers and was assigned to the Triple-A Albuquerque Isotopes to start the season. He battled injuries and only appeared in five games for the Isotopes, going hitless in 13 at-bats. Zawadzki was released by the Dodgers organization on May 7, 2012.

=== Atlanta Braves ===
On May 21, 2012, Zawadzki signed a minor league contract with the Atlanta Braves and was assigned to the Triple-A Gwinnett Braves. In 48 appearances for Gwinnett, he batted .231/.271/.340 with three home runs, 17 RBI, and three stolen bases. Zawadzki was released by the Braves organization on July 28.

=== St. Louis Cardinals ===
Zawadzki signed a minor league contract with the St. Louis Cardinals on August 10, 2012, and was assigned to the Triple-A Memphis Redbirds. In eight appearances for Memphis, he went 9-for-32 (.281) with three RBI and one stolen bases. Zawadzki elected free agency following the season on November 2.

=== Toronto Blue Jays ===
On December 18, 2012, the Toronto Blue Jays announced that Zawadzki had been signed to a minor league contract with an invitation to spring training. Zawadzki was assigned to the Double-A New Hampshire Fisher Cats from the Triple-A Buffalo Bisons on July 30, 2013. In 34 appearances split between Buffalo, New Hampshire, and the rookie-level Gulf Coast League Blue Jays, he batted .208 with one home run, six RBI, and five stolen bases. Zawadzki elected free agency following the season on November 4.

=== Lancaster Barnstormers ===
Zawadzki signed with the Lancaster Barnstormers of the Atlantic League of Professional Baseball for the 2014 season.

Zawadzki made 128 appearances for the Barnstormers in 2014, slashing .238/.288/.366 with 11 home runs, 53 RBI, and 15 stolen bases. During the year, Zawadzki was teammates with his brother, Grant, for the first time in professional baseball. He became a free agent following the season.

On February 24, 2015, Zawadzki once more re-signed with Lancaster. In 121 appearances for the Barnstormers, he batted .275/.319/.450 with 20 home runs, 63 RBI, and 20 stolen bases. Zawadzki became a free agent after the season.

On March 31, 2016, Zawadzki re-signed with the Barnstormers. In 28 appearances for the team, he slashed .240/.298/.458 with seven home runs, 18 RBI, and two stolen bases.

=== Sugar Land Skeeters ===
In July 2016, Zawadzki was traded to the Sugar Land Skeeters of the Atlantic League of Professional Baseball. In 33 games for the Skeeters, he hit .268/.311/.409 with three home runs, nine RBI, and four stolen bases.

On March 3, 2017, Zawadzki re-signed with Sugar Land. In 32 appearances for the Skeeters, he batted .242/.309/.419 with five home runs, 16 RBI, and five stolen bases.

=== Lancaster Barnstormers (second stint) ===
On August 23, 2017, Zawadzki was traded to the Lancaster Barnstormers. In 25 games down the stretch, he hit .221/.306/.326 with two home runs, 11 RBI, and four stolen bases. Zawadzki announced his retirement from professional baseball following the season.

== Post-playing career ==
=== Boston Red Sox ===
On March 11, 2018, Zawadzki was named a coach for the Lowell Spinners, the Low-A affiliate of the Boston Red Sox. He served as hitting coach of the High-A Salem Red Sox in 2019, and in January 2020 was named hitting coach of the Double-A Portland Sea Dogs.

=== Detroit Tigers ===
On December 4, 2023, the Detroit Tigers hire Zawadzki to serve as the team's assistant hitting coach.
