= Tim Stauffer =

American baseball player (born 1982)

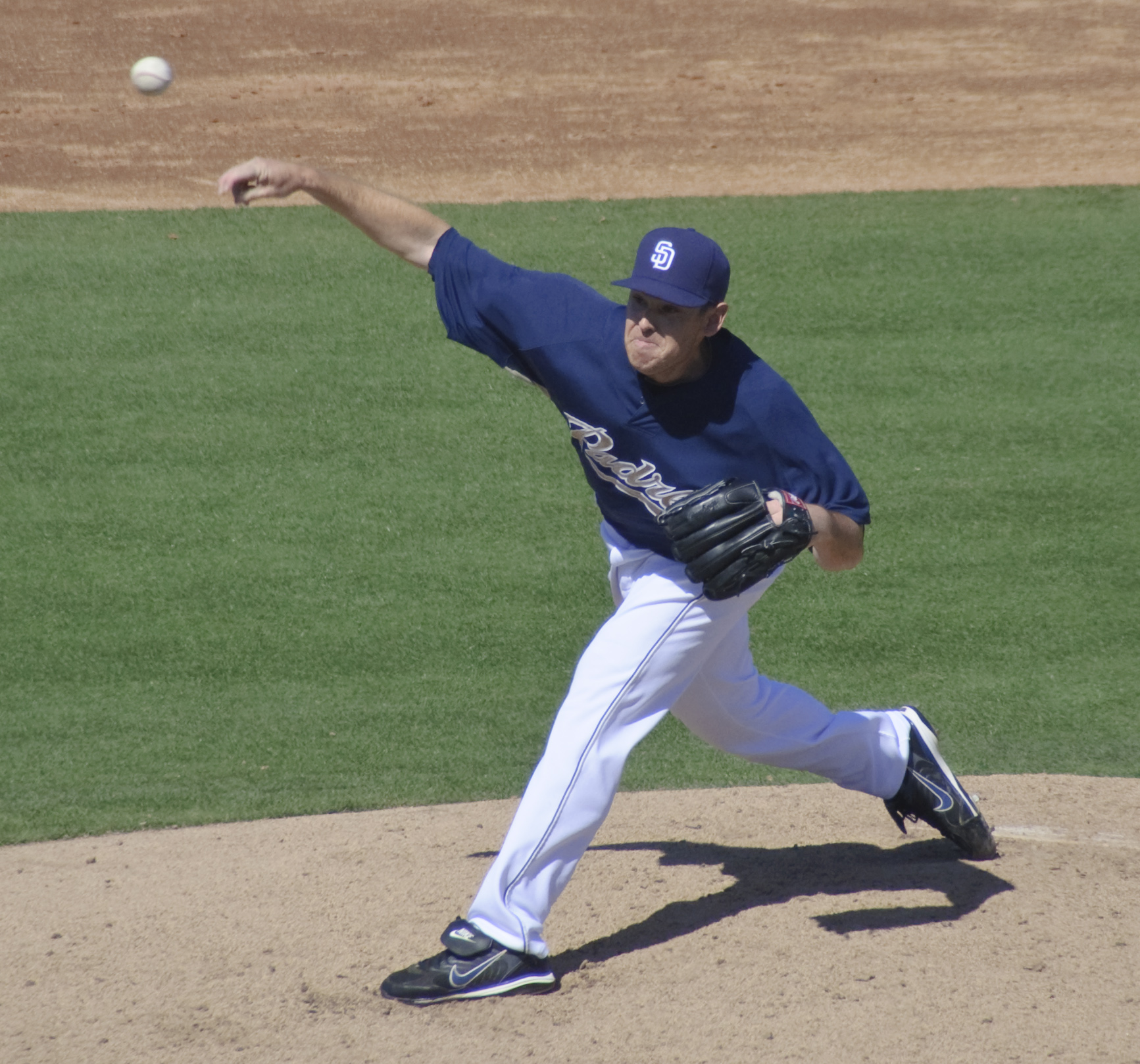
- Stauffer with the San Diego Padres
- Pitcher
- Born: June 2, 1982 (age 44); Portland, Maine, U.S.
- Batted: Right Threw: Right

MLB debut
- May 11, 2005, for the San Diego Padres

Last MLB appearance
- October 1, 2015, for the New York Mets

MLB statistics
- Win–loss record: 33–34
- Earned run average: 3.97
- Strikeouts: 449
- Stats at Baseball Reference

Teams
- San Diego Padres (2005–2007, 2009–2014); Minnesota Twins (2015); New York Mets (2015)

Timothy James Stauffer (born June 2, 1982) is an American former professional baseball pitcher. He played in Major League Baseball (MLB) for the San Diego Padres, Minnesota Twins, and New York Mets.

== Amateur career ==
=== High school and college ===
Stauffer attended and played baseball at Saratoga Central Catholic High School in Saratoga Springs, New York. As a senior in 2000, as of June 7, he had a 1.10 earned run average, 163 strikeouts and 14 walks in 82 innings pitched. He was hitting .610 at the plate with 12 home runs, 53 runs scored, and 50 RBI in 95 at-bats.

Stauffer attended the University of Richmond through his junior year, where he was twice named the Atlantic 10 Conference Pitcher of the Year. As a sophomore in 2002, Stauffer established Atlantic 10 records for wins (15) and strike-outs (140). He posted a 1.54 ERA and was named a first-team All-American. In 2003, Stauffer broke his own Atlantic 10 strike-out record with 146 and posted a 9–5 record with a 1.97 ERA and 10 complete games. He was again selected for the All-America Team.

=== Summer collegiate league ===
Stauffer played for the Keene Swamp Bats of the New England Collegiate Baseball League in the summer of 2001, setting an NECBL record with a 7–0 win/loss mark. In 2002, he played for the Chatham A's of the Cape Cod League, was named a league all-star, and is featured in the book The Last Best League: One Summer, One Season, One Dream by Jim Collins.

== Professional career ==
=== San Diego Padres ===
Stauffer was selected in the first round by the San Diego Padres as the fourth overall pick of the 2003 Major League Baseball draft. Stauffer had been bothered by shoulder soreness since the end of the college season, and an MRI in July showed weakness in the shoulder joint. He and his agent went to the Padres with this information during negotiations, and as a result, he signed with the Padres for a bonus much less than a fourth overall pick would normally receive. The Padres' scouting director, Bill Gayton, said about the disclosure, "Their honesty and integrity are second to none. They didn't have to do that."

Stauffer rested his arm in 2003 and began 2004 with the High-A Lake Elsinore Storm. He was quickly promoted through Double-A and reached the Triple-A Portland Beavers in June, posting a 3.54 ERA in 14 starts with the club. Stauffer was being projected as a number 3 starter, soon to reach the major leagues.

Stauffer began the 2005 season in Triple-A. He made his Major League debut on May 11 against the Cincinnati Reds and earned his first win in a 6-inning, 2-run outing. He pitched to a 3–6 record with a 5.33 ERA with the Padres in 2005 and was returned to Triple-A after a July 31 relief appearance.

Stauffer spent most of 2006 and 2007 with Triple-A Portland. He was called up to the Padres for a single appearance on August 21, 2006, to temporarily fill a spot in a pitching rotation hampered by injuries. His third and fourth call-ups came on July 29, 2007, and August 26, 2007, where he again made spot starts before being sent back to Triple-A. He posted a 15–17 record and 4.98 ERA in 46 starts over his 2006 and 2007 Triple-A seasons.

After the 2007 season, Stauffer elected to have surgery to repair a tear in the labrum of his right shoulder. The surgery and rehab cost him the entire 2008 season, and Stauffer began 2009 with the Double-A San Antonio Missions after a month of extended spring training to build arm strength.

Stauffer was called back to the big leagues on July 11, 2009. He made 14 starts for the Padres in the second half, posting a 4–7 record and 3.58 ERA.

In 2010, Stauffer started the season working out of the Padres' bullpen and posted a 0.49 ERA in 9 appearances. He got his first opportunity to start on May 9, replacing Kevin Correia, but Stauffer required an emergency appendectomy on May 11, sidelining him for nearly two months. When he rejoined the club, he worked out of the bullpen until September, when he made six more starts. Stauffer finished the season with a 6–5 record and 1.85 ERA, with 61 strike-outs and 24 walks in 82 2/3 innings pitched.

Stauffer was the Padres' Opening Day pitcher in 2011 and was a mainstay of the rotation. He started 31 games and finished the season with a 9–12 record and 3.73 ERA, with 128 strike-outs versus 58 walks over 185 2/3 innings.

In early 2012, Stauffer and the Padres agreed on a one-year, $3.2 million contract to avoid arbitration. Stauffer was again the planned Opening Day starter but suffered an elbow strain in spring training and was placed on the disabled list. He only made a single start in May before returning to the DL. In August, Stauffer had surgery on the flexor tendon in his right elbow. After the season, the Padres did not tender an offer to Stauffer, and he elected for free agency after clearing waivers.

On January 29, 2013, Stauffer re-signed with the Padres on a minor league contract. After going 2–2 with a 3.16 ERA in Triple-A, Stauffer's contract was selected, and he was called up to the Majors on May 17. Stauffer settled into a long relief role with the Padres' bullpen, pitching multiple innings in 22 of his 43 relief appearances. He finished the 2013 season with a 3–1 record and 3.75 ERA, recording 64 strike-outs in 69 2/3 innings.

Stauffer signed a new one-year, $1.6 million contract with San Diego on December 2, 2013, avoiding arbitration. Stauffer again primarily worked out of the pen as a long reliever, making three starts in late May and early June after Robbie Erlin went to the disabled list. He finished the 2014 season with an overall 3.50 ERA and a 2.56 ERA as a reliever, striking out 67 in 64 1/3 innings.

=== Minnesota Twins ===
On December 23, 2014, Stauffer signed a one-year $2.2 million contract with the Minnesota Twins. On May 1, Stauffer landed on the disabled list with a strained right intercostal muscle. He was designated for assignment on June 11, 2015, and released on June 17.

=== Sugar Land Skeeters ===
On July 14, 2015, Stauffer signed with the Sugar Land Skeeters of the Atlantic League of Professional Baseball. He made 3 starts for Sugar Land, posting a 1-1 record and 1.69 ERA with 10 strikeouts over 16 innings.

=== New York Mets ===
On July 31, 2015, Stauffer signed a minor league contract with the New York Mets. Stauffer pitched for the Las Vegas 51s of the Triple-A Pacific Coast League and was promoted to the major leagues on September 8. Stauffer was designated for assignment by the Mets on October 12, thus making him a free agent to make room for Matt Reynolds on the 40-man roster. Stauffer had a 7.94 ERA in five appearances for the Mets.

=== Arizona Diamondbacks ===
Stauffer agreed to a minor league contract with the Arizona Diamondbacks organization on December 23, 2015. He was released prior to the start of the season on March 28, 2016.
