= Wade LeBlanc =

American baseball player (born 1984)

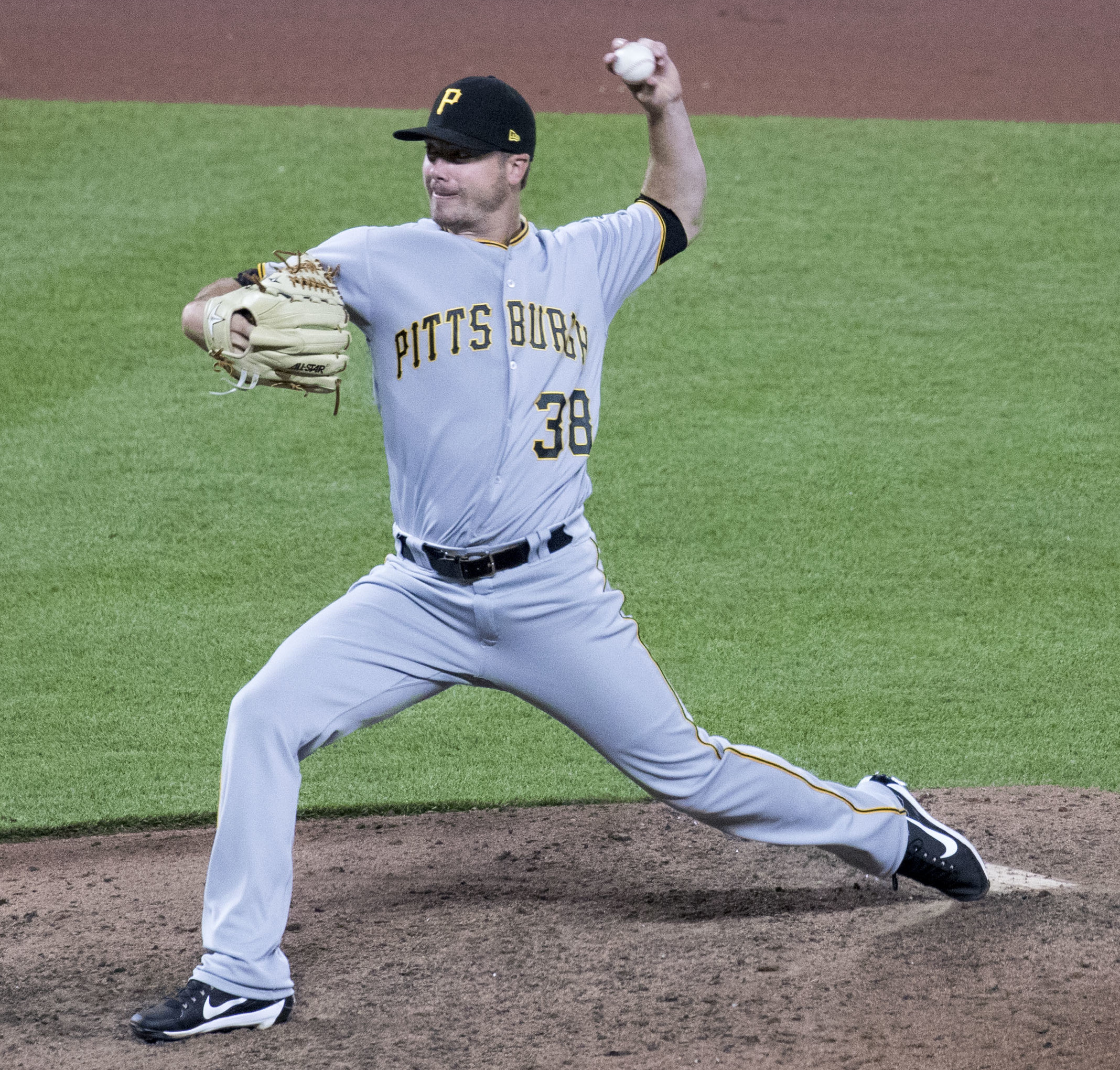
- LeBlanc with the Pittsburgh Pirates in 2017
- Pitcher
- Born: August 7, 1984 (age 41); Lake Charles, Louisiana, U.S.
- Batted: Left Threw: Left

Professional debut
- MLB: September 3, 2008, for the San Diego Padres
- NPB: May 21, 2015, for the Saitama Seibu Lions

Last appearance
- NPB: 2015, for the Saitama Seibu Lions
- MLB: August 12, 2021, for the St. Louis Cardinals

MLB statistics
- Win–loss record: 46–49
- Earned run average: 4.54
- Strikeouts: 671

NPB statistics
- Win–loss record: 2–5
- Earned run average: 4.23
- Strikeouts: 26
- Stats at Baseball Reference

Teams
- San Diego Padres (2008–2011); Miami Marlins (2012–2013); Houston Astros (2013); Los Angeles Angels of Anaheim (2014); New York Yankees (2014); Los Angeles Angels of Anaheim (2014); Saitama Seibu Lions (2015); Seattle Mariners (2016); Pittsburgh Pirates (2016–2017); Seattle Mariners (2018–2019); Baltimore Orioles (2020–2021); St. Louis Cardinals (2021)

Wade Matthew LeBlanc (born August 7, 1984) is an American former professional baseball pitcher. He played in Major League Baseball (MLB) for the San Diego Padres, Miami Marlins, Houston Astros, Los Angeles Angels of Anaheim, New York Yankees, Pittsburgh Pirates, Seattle Mariners, Baltimore Orioles and St. Louis Cardinals and in Nippon Professional Baseball (NPB) for the Saitama Seibu Lions.

== Amateur career ==
LeBlanc was drafted by the Tampa Bay Devil Rays in the 36th round of the 2003 Major League Baseball draft out of Alfred M. Barbe High School, but instead decided to attend the University of Alabama, where he played college baseball for the Alabama Crimson Tide. In 2004, LeBlanc was named the Baseball America Freshman of the Year, becoming only the sixth SEC player and first pitcher since 1995 to win the award. In 2005, he played collegiate summer baseball with the Wareham Gatemen of the Cape Cod Baseball League and was named a league all-star.

== Professional career ==
=== San Diego Padres ===
==== 2006-07: Draft and pro debut ====
The San Diego Padres selected LeBlanc in the second round of the 2006 Major League Baseball draft.

He posted a 5–1 record and a 3.02 ERA in 14 games, 10 starts, from Short-Season Eugene Emeralds and the Class-A Fort Wayne Wizards in 2006. On June 29 against the Vancouver Canadians he earned his first win in his professional debut, tossing one scoreless inning of relief. He was promoted to Fort Wayne on July 24. He tossed four scoreless innings, allowing four hits and no walks while striking out seven in his Wizards' debut on July 28. He won his final three starts from August 18 to September 2, giving up just two runs over 15 innings. He struck out a season-high eight batters over five scoreless innings on August 27.

==== 2008–2011: Call-up and struggles ====
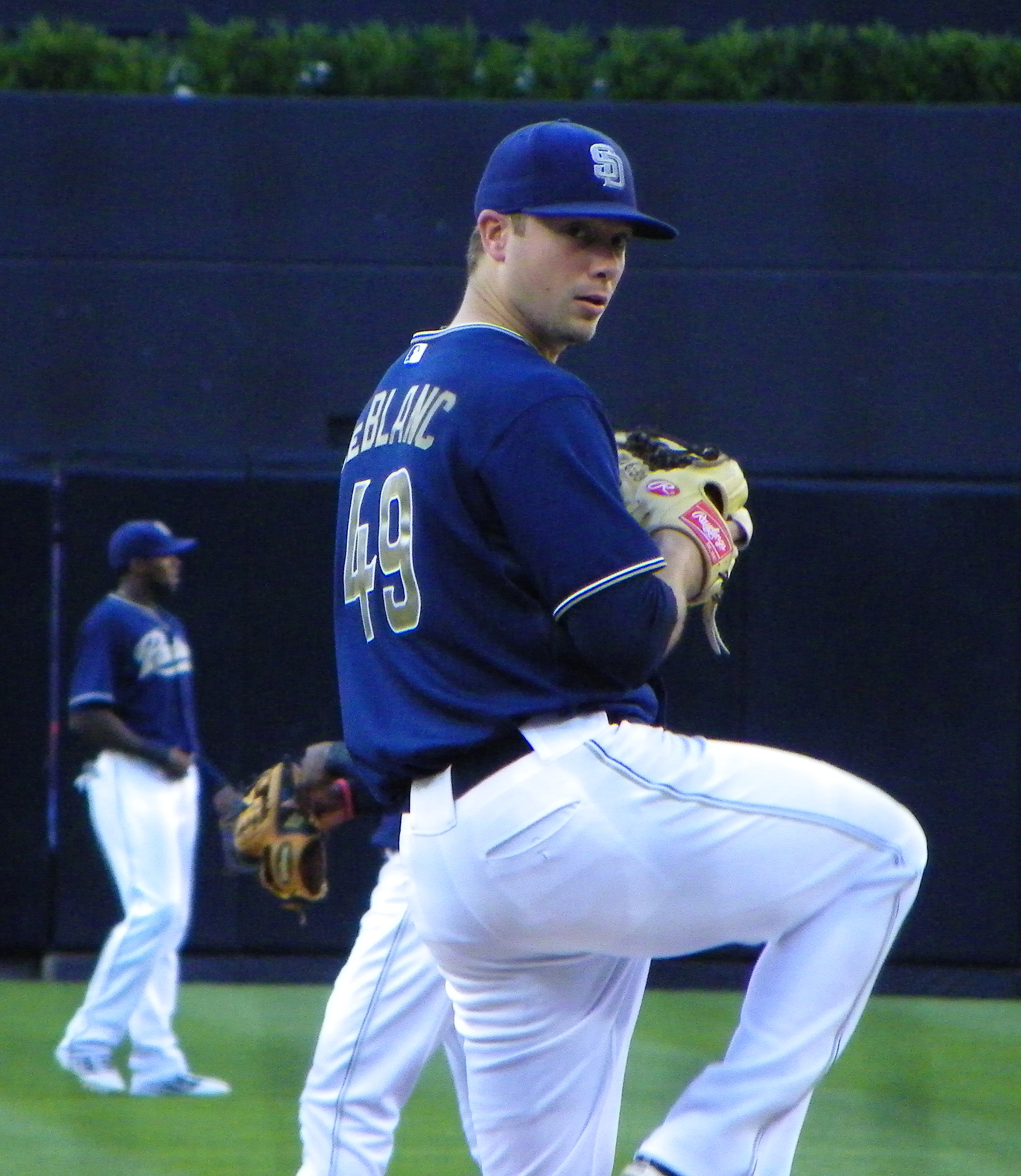
LeBlanc prior to a Padres game in September 2011

LeBlanc spent the majority of the 2008 season with the Triple-A Portland Beavers, pitching in 26 games, all but one of which he started. He ranked second in the Pacific Coast League in strikeouts with 139 and tied for third in wins with 11. He was the third Portland pitcher and the first left-handed pitcher since the team returned to the PCL in 2001 to reach the 11-win mark. He won the PCL Pitcher of the Week award on two occasions.

He was called up to the Majors for the first time on September 1, 2008. He made his Major League debut on September 3, but struggled, allowing four runs on eight hits with one strikeout in four innings. He picked up his first Major League win on September 15 against the Colorado Rockies, yielding four runs over six innings with six strikeouts.

In 2009, he spent the majority of the season in AAA. Upon being called up to the Majors, he had an ERA of 3.69 in 9 starts with a record of 3–1. In 2010, he pitched almost the whole season in the Padres rotation, going 8–12 in 25 starts. In 2011, LeBlanc spent half the season on the disabled list and in the minors. In 14 starts for the Padres, he had a 5–6 record with a 4.63 ERA.

=== Miami Marlins ===
On November 22, 2011, San Diego traded LeBlanc to the Miami Marlins for John Baker. He was sent to triple-A New Orleans Zephyrs.

On June 30, 2012, LeBlanc was called up by the Marlins to replace Edward Mujica, who was placed on the disabled list with a fractured toe. He played his first game as a Marlin on July 3 against the Milwaukee Brewers, and went 2/3 of an inning. With Carlos Zambrano struggling, Marlins manager Ozzie Guillen moved Zambrano to the bullpen and let LeBlanc take his spot in the rotation. As a starter, LeBlanc went 1-4. Overall, he pitched in 25 games (9 starts) with a 3.67 ERA, a 1.31 WHIP, 19 walks, 43 strikeouts, and a 2–5 record in 68 2/3 innings pitched.

LeBlanc began 2013 as the fourth member of the Marlins rotation, where he made 7 starts before being moved to the bullpen in favor of Tom Koehler. He was designated for assignment on June 3, 2013, one day after picking up his first win in 2013. In 13 games with Miami, he went 1–5 with a 5.18 ERA, striking out 31 in 48 2/3 innings.

=== Houston Astros ===
LeBlanc was claimed off waivers by the Houston Astros on June 8, 2013, and he was inserted into the bullpen. After making 3 appearances, including one on June 23 where he gave up 4 runs in 1 2/3 innings, he was designated for assignment on June 24. He was outrighted to Triple-A Oklahoma City two days later. He was called back up on August 19. He came in the game that day, giving up 5 runs (1 earned) in 2 2/3 innings of relief. He was designated for assignment the next day, and was outrighted to Oklahoma City two days later, where he finished the season. In 19 games (7 starts) with the RedHawks, he went 3–1 with a 4.71 ERA, striking out 47 in 49 2/3 innings. After the year, LeBlanc became a minor league free agent.

=== Los Angeles Angels of Anaheim ===
On November 11, 2013, LeBlanc was signed by the Los Angeles Angels of Anaheim to a minor league deal with an invitation to Spring training. He began the year with Triple-A Salt Lake, where in 9 starts, he went 5–1 with a 3.69 ERA and 43 strikeouts. LeBlanc joined the Angels on May 25, 2014, with the intention of being the starting pitcher later in the week. He never ended up starting with the Angels. However, on May 30, he pitched 6 2/3 innings in relief of that day's starter Garrett Richards, who went 2/3 of an inning while giving up 5 runs, and LeBlanc allowed 4 earned runs on 6 hits, striking out 4 batters. The next day on May 31, LeBlanc was designated for assignment by the Angels.

=== New York Yankees ===
On June 3, 2014, LeBlanc was claimed on waivers from the Angels by the New York Yankees. He was designated for assignment on June 11. He made one appearance with the Yankees, pitching an inning of relief on June 4, giving up 2 runs on 2 hits and a walk. LeBlanc elected free agency on June 15.

=== Second stint with Angels ===
On June 17, 2014, LeBlanc re-signed with the Los Angeles Angels of Anaheim on a minor league deal. He made one appearance for the team before being designated for assignment on August 26. He was called back up on September 2. LeBlanc made a start on September 23, 2014, pitching 5+ innings in a combined shutout against the Oakland Athletics.

=== Saitama Seibu Lions ===
On December 12, 2014, LeBlanc signed with the Saitama Seibu Lions of NPB. He appeared in eight games for the Lions in 2015, posting a 2–5 record with a 4.23 ERA.

=== Toronto Blue Jays ===
On December 17, 2015, LeBlanc signed a minor league contract with the Toronto Blue Jays that included an invitation to spring training. He was assigned to minor league camp on March 18. On June 1, LeBlanc was named May's International League Player of the Month. He made 6 starts in May for the Buffalo Bisons, and pitched to a 3–0 record, 0.70 ERA, and 36 strikeouts in 38 1/3 innings.

=== Seattle Mariners ===
On June 22, 2016, LeBlanc was traded to the Seattle Mariners in exchange for cash considerations or a player to be named later. He was added to the Mariners' active roster on June 24. He was designated for assignment on August 25, and sent outright to the Triple-A Tacoma Rainiers on September 4.

=== Pittsburgh Pirates ===
LeBlanc was traded to the Pittsburgh Pirates in exchange for cash considerations or a player to be named later on September 13, 2016. The Pirates avoided going to salary arbitration with LeBlanc on December 3, 2016, by signing him to a one-year, $800,000 contract for the 2017 season with a $1.25 million option for 2018. On November 3, 2017, the Pirates declined LeBlanc's option and outrighted him to Triple-A. He elected free agency on November 6, 2017.

=== Second stint with the Mariners ===
On January 16, 2018, LeBlanc signed a minor league contract with the New York Yankees. He was released on March 23. The following day, LeBlanc signed a major league contract with the Seattle Mariners. On July 3, 2018, having started the season 3–0 with a 3.38 ERA, LeBlanc signed an extension through 2019 with the Mariners for $2 million with a $300,000 signing bonus, and with $5 million options for the 2020, '21, and '22 seasons with $450,000 buyouts each season. LeBlanc pitched most of the season in the rotation, collecting 9 wins with a career low 3.72 ERA in 32 games, 27 starts.

He began the 2019 season as the Mariners 5th starter; after 3 starts he was placed on the disabled list with a grade 2 oblique strain, sidelining him 4–6 weeks. In 2019 he was 6-7 with a 5.71 ERA. On October 31, 2019, LeBlanc became a free agent after the Mariners declined his 2020 contract option.

=== Baltimore Orioles ===
On January 28, 2020, LeBlanc signed a minor league deal with the Baltimore Orioles. On July 15, it was reported that the Orioles purchased his contract, putting him on the 40-man roster for the shortened season. On August 25, 2020, it was announced that LeBlanc would be out for the remainder of the season due to a stress reaction in his throwing elbow. In his time with the Orioles in 2020, LeBlanc pitched to a 8.06 ERA and gave up six home runs over 22 1/3 innings pitched.

On February 2, 2021, LeBlanc re-signed with the Orioles on a minor league contract and was invited to Spring Training. On March 25, LeBlanc opted out of his contract and was released by the Orioles. On March 26, 2021, LeBlanc re-signed with the Orioles on a major league split contract that gives him a $700K salary in the majors. On April 25, the Orioles designated LeBlanc for assignment after he had allowed 7 runs across 6 appearances on the season. LeBlanc elected free agency on April 29, 2021.

=== Milwaukee Brewers ===
On May 4, 2021, LeBlanc signed a minor league contract with the Milwaukee Brewers organization and was assigned to the Triple-A Nashville Sounds. LeBlanc hurled 16.2 innings of 3.78 ERA ball in Nashville before exercising his opt-out clause and electing free agency on May 27.

=== Texas Rangers ===
On June 1, 2021, LeBlanc signed a minor league contract with the Texas Rangers organization and was assigned to the Triple-A Round Rock Express. In 3 appearances for Round Rock, he recorded a 2.50 ERA and 2-0 record. LeBlanc requested and received his release from Texas on June 16, 2021.

=== St. Louis Cardinals ===
On June 17, 2021, LeBlanc signed a major league contract with the St. Louis Cardinals and was added to the active roster. LeBlanc pitched to a 3.61 ERA in 12 appearances in St. Louis. On September 9, he was shut down for the remainder of the year due to a lingering elbow injury.

On April 2, 2022, LeBlanc announced his retirement from professional baseball after 13 major league seasons.

== Personal life ==
LeBlanc and his wife, Natalie, have two sons. They reside in Lake Charles, Louisiana, during the off-season.

After being drafted in 2006, LeBlanc did not finish his degree at the University of Alabama. He returned to Alabama and graduated with a degree in 2018 at 34 years old.
