= 2010 Atlanta Braves season =

2010 Atlanta Braves
- National League Wild Card winners
- League: National League
- Division: East
- Ballpark: Turner Field
- City: Atlanta, Georgia
- Record: 91–71 (.562)
- Divisional place: 2nd
- Owners: Liberty Media
- General managers: Frank Wren
- Managers: Bobby Cox
- Television: SportSouth; Fox Sports South; Peachtree TV
- Radio: WCNN; WNNX; Atlanta Braves Radio Network

The 2010 Atlanta Braves season was the franchise's 45th season in Atlanta along with the 135th season in the National League and 140th overall. It featured the Braves' attempt to reclaim a postseason berth for the first time since 2005. The Braves once again were skippered by Bobby Cox, in his 25th and final overall season managing the team. It was their 45th season in Atlanta, and the 135th of the franchise. Finishing the season with a 91–71 record, the Braves won the NL Wild Card, only to be eliminated in the NLDS by the San Francisco Giants in four games.

== Offseason ==
=== Offseason additions and subtractions ===
	Subtractions	Additions
**Players**	**RHS** Javier Vázquez (traded to Yankees); **RHR** Rafael Soriano (traded to Rays); **LHR** Mike Gonzalez (signed with Orioles); **LF** Garret Anderson (signed with Dodgers); **1B** Adam LaRoche (signed with Diamondbacks); **2B** Kelly Johnson (signed with Diamondbacks); **1B/OF** Greg Norton (retired); **OF** Ryan Church (signed with Pirates); **RHS** Boone Logan (traded to Yankees)	**LHR** Billy Wagner (Signed as a free agent); **RHR** Takashi Saito (Signed as a free agent); **1B/OF** Eric Hinske (Signed as a free agent); **1B/3B** Troy Glaus (Signed as a free agent); **OF** Melky Cabrera (Acquired in trade from Yankees); **LHR** Mike Dunn (Acquired in trade from Yankees); **RHR** Jesse Chavez (Acquired in trade from Rays); **RHR** Scott Proctor* (Signed as minor league free agent); **RHR** Juan Abreu (Signed as minor league free agent); **OF** Mitch Jones* (Signed as minor league free agent); **OF** Brent Clevlen* (Signed as minor league free agent); **2B** Joe Thurston* (Signed as minor league free agent); **RHS** Arodys Vizcaíno (Acquired in trade from Yankees)

*Player was non-roster invitee to Spring training (not on 40-man Roster)

=== Timeline ===
Names highlighted in bold appear in the table above.

Frank Wren began the offseason for the Atlanta Braves with the acquisition of relief pitcher Scott Proctor to a split contract. The contract assured Proctor would earn the minor league minimum while playing in the minors and earn the pro-rated portion of $750,000 plus a possible $250,000 in the major leagues.

November 12, 2009: Veteran starting pitcher Tim Hudson agreed to a three-year/$27 million contract extension with a club option for 2013 at $9 million.

November 24, 2009: The Braves signed minor league free agent Juan Abreu, a right-handed relief pitcher, to a one-year minor league contract.

December 2, 2009: Veteran closer Billy Wagner and the Atlanta Braves agreed to a one-year contract. The six-time All-Star received $6.75 million in 2010, and his deal included a $6.5 million club option for 2011 with a $250,000 buyout.

December 3, 2009: The Braves signed closer Takashi Saito to a one-year/$3.2 million deal, with an additional $2.3 million to be earned through incentives. He served as the set-up man to Billy Wagner during the 2010 season.

December 9, 2009: The Braves traded closer Rafael Soriano to the Tampa Bay Rays for relief pitcher Jesse Chavez.

December 18, 2009: The Braves signed outfielder Mitch Jones and infielder Joe Thurston to minor league contracts.

December 22, 2009: The Braves traded starting pitcher Javier Vázquez and relief pitcher Boone Logan to the New York Yankees for outfielder Melky Cabrera, relief pitcher Mike Dunn, and relief pitcher Arodys Vizcaíno.

January 5, 2010: Infielder Troy Glaus and the Atlanta Braves agreed to a one-year/$1.75 million deal, with an additional $2.5 million to be earned through incentives. He served the Braves in 2010 at 1st base and 3rd base.

January 5, 2010: Utility man Eric Hinske and the Atlanta Braves agreed to a one-year/$1.5 million deal.

== Regular season ==
=== Season standings ===
==== National League East ====
NL East
Team	W	L	Pct.	GB	Home	Road
Philadelphia Phillies	97	65	.599	—	54‍–‍30	43‍–‍35
Atlanta Braves	91	71	.562	6	56‍–‍25	35‍–‍46
Florida Marlins	80	82	.494	17	41‍–‍40	39‍–‍42
New York Mets	79	83	.488	18	47‍–‍34	32‍–‍49
Washington Nationals	69	93	.426	28	41‍–‍40	28‍–‍53

==== National League Wild Card ====
Division leaders
Team	W	L	Pct.
Philadelphia Phillies	97	65	.599
San Francisco Giants	92	70	.568
Cincinnati Reds	91	71	.562

Wild Card team (Top team qualifies for postseason)
Team	W	L	Pct.	GB
Atlanta Braves	91	71	.562	—
San Diego Padres	90	72	.556	1
St. Louis Cardinals	86	76	.531	5
Colorado Rockies	83	79	.512	8
Florida Marlins	80	82	.494	11
Los Angeles Dodgers	80	82	.494	11
New York Mets	79	83	.488	12
Milwaukee Brewers	77	85	.475	14
Houston Astros	76	86	.469	15
Chicago Cubs	75	87	.463	16
Washington Nationals	69	93	.426	22
Arizona Diamondbacks	65	97	.401	26
Pittsburgh Pirates	57	105	.352	34

==== Record vs. opponents ====
2010 National League record Source: MLB Standings Grid – 2010
Team	AZ	ATL	CHC	CIN	COL	FLA	HOU	LAD	MIL	NYM	PHI	PIT	SD	SF	STL	WSH	AL
Arizona	–	3–4	1–6	2–5	9–9	3–3	4–3	5–13	3–4	5–1	2–4	2–4	8–10	5–13	4–5	3–4	6–9
Atlanta	4–3	–	4–2	3–2	2–4	11–7	5–1	5–3	5–2	11–7	8–10	6–3	4–2	4–3	2–6	8–10	9–6
Chicago	6–1	2–4	–	4–12	2–3	4–2	7–11	3–4	9–6	3–4	4–2	5–10	3–5	2–5	9–6	4–2	8–10
Cincinnati	5–2	2–3	12–4	–	2–5	5–2	10–5	5–4	11–3	4–2	2–5	10–6	2–4	3–4	6–12	4–3	8–7
Colorado	9–9	4–2	3–2	5–2	–	3–4	2–4	7–11	5–4	3–3	1–6	3–4	12–6	9–9	3–4	5–3	9–6
Florida	3–3	7–11	2–4	2–5	4–3	–	3–3	4–2	4–4	12–6	5–13	6–2	3–6	2–5	3–2	13–5	7–8
Houston	3–4	1–5	11–7	5–10	4–2	3–3	–	2–4	8–7	3–4	4–3	11–4	2–5	2–7	10–5	4–4	3–12
Los Angeles	13–5	3–5	4–3	4–5	11–7	2–4	4–2	–	4–2	3–4	2–4	4–3	8–10	8–10	3–4	3–3	4–11
Milwaukee	4–3	2–5	6–9	3–11	4–5	4–4	7–8	2–4	–	5–2	1–5	13–5	3–4	2–5	8–7	4–2	9–6
New York	1–5	7–11	4–3	2–4	3–3	6–12	4–3	4–3	2–5	–	9–9	6–1	3–3	3–4	3–3	9–9	13–5
Philadelphia	4–2	10–8	2–4	5–2	6–1	13–5	3–4	4–2	5–1	9–9	–	2–4	5–2	3–3	4–4	12–6	10–8
Pittsburgh	4–2	3–6	10–5	6–10	4–3	2–6	4–11	3–4	5–13	1–6	4–2	–	0–6	2–4	6–9	1–5	2–13
San Diego	10–8	2–4	5–3	4–2	6–12	6–3	5–2	10–8	4–3	3–3	2–5	6–0	–	12–6	3–4	3–3	9–6
San Francisco	13–5	3–4	5–2	4–3	9–9	5–2	7–2	10–8	5–2	4–3	3–3	4–2	6–12	–	3–3	4–2	7–8
St. Louis	5–4	6–2	6–9	12–6	4–3	2–3	5–10	4–3	7–8	3–3	4–4	9–6	4–3	3–3	–	3–3	9–6
Washington	4–3	10–8	2–4	3–4	3–5	5–13	4–4	3–3	2–4	9–9	6–12	5–1	3–3	2–4	3–3	–	5–13

=== Opening Day starters ===
Position	Name
Starting Pitcher	Derek Lowe
Catcher	Brian McCann
First Baseman	Troy Glaus
Second Baseman	Martín Prado
Third Baseman	Chipper Jones
Shortstop	Yunel Escobar
Left Fielder	Melky Cabrera
Center Fielder	Nate McLouth
Right Fielder	Jason Heyward

=== Notables ===
April 5, 2010: During the first inning of a 16–5 Braves walloping of the Chicago Cubs on Opening Day, rookie Jason Heyward launched a three-run home run during his first Major League at-bat. Heyward became the eleventh Braves player to homer in his Major League debut, and just the fifth to go deep in his first at-bat.

May 20, 2010: Going into the bottom of the ninth down 9–3 against the Cincinnati Reds, the Braves scored seven runs to beat the Reds by a final score of 10–9. The late rally was capped by a Brooks Conrad pinch-hit grand slam that scored the final four runs to win the game by one. Conrad's walk-off grand slam to overcome a three-run deficit was the 23rd in Major League history, and just the second time it has been done by a pinch-hitter. The last pinch-hitter to do so was Jack Phillips of the Pittsburgh Pirates on July 8, 1950.

May 31, 2010: The Atlanta Braves defeated the then-first-place Philadelphia Phillies at Turner Field to take sole possession of first place in the National League East standings, a position they had maintained for exactly one hundred days until losing to the Pittsburgh Pirates on September 7, 2010, to relinquish the lead back to the Phillies. The last time the Atlanta Braves had led the NL East on September 1 was in 2005.

June 3, 2010: Winning the first game of a four-game series against the Los Angeles Dodgers, the Braves extended their winning streak to nine games. It was the longest winning streak for the Braves since they won sixteen in a row in 2000.

July 13, 2010: At the 2010 MLB All-Star Game in Anaheim, Braves catcher Brian McCann was awarded the All-Star Game MVP Award for his clutch two-out, three-run double in the seventh inning to give the National League its first win in the All-Star Game since 1996. He became the first Brave to win the MVP Award since Fred McGriff did so in 1994.

August 22, 2010: Facing the Chicago Cubs, Mike Minor struck out twelve batters through six innings, setting an Atlanta Braves single-game rookie strikeout record. The previous record holder, Tommy Hanson, struck out eleven against the San Francisco Giants on July 20, 2009. This was also the last game for Lou Piniella as the Chicago Cubs manager before his retirement.

August 27, 2010: In the ninth inning of a 1–7 loss to the Florida Marlins, Braves veteran closer Billy Wagner recorded his 1,170th career strikeout, getting Mike Stanton. The strikeout set a new left-handed reliever strikeout record as Wagner passed Jesse Orosco in career strikeouts. After the game, Wagner declined to speak to the media, simply stating, "We lost".

September 25, 2010: Upon defeating the Washington Nationals by a 5–0 score in Washington, D.C., Braves skipper Bobby Cox won his 2,500th career game as a manager. Cox became just the fourth manager in MLB history to win 2,500 games.

October 3, 2010: Entering the final scheduled regular-season game of the year tied for the NL Wild Card lead, the Atlanta Braves defeated the Phillies in an 8–7 victory in front of a sold-out crowd at Turner Field. Approximately two and a half hours later, the San Francisco Giants defeated the San Diego Padres to give the Braves the Wild Card and their first postseason appearance since 2005.

October 8, 2010: In the tenth inning of Game 2 of the NLDS, Braves closer Billy Wagner injured himself while fielding a bunted ball by Giants center-fielder Andrés Torres. This was the last Major League appearance for the veteran left-handed reliever.

October 10, 2010: In Game 3 of the NLDS, Braves second-baseman Brooks Conrad committed three errors, pushing his error total in the NLDS to four. His four errors set a new Divisional Series record for errors by a single fielder. The errors allowed the Giants two unearned runs, which were the deciding factor in the Braves' pivotal Game 3 loss. Conrad was benched the following day, after committing eight errors in his final seven games.

October 11, 2010: Losing Game 4 of the NLDS by a score of 2–3, the Giants eliminated the Braves from the postseason, winning the series three games to one. This game was the last Major League game ever managed by long-time Braves manager Bobby Cox.

=== Game log ===
Legend
Braves Win	Braves Loss	Game postponed

2010 Regular Season Game Log
April (9–14)

#	Date	Opponent	Score	Win	Loss	Save	Attendance	Time	Record
1	April 5	Cubs	16–5	Lowe (1–0)	Zambrano (0–1)		53,081	2:45	1–0
2	April 7	Cubs	3–2	Moylan (1–0)	Grabow (0–1)	Wagner (1)	36,170	2:41	2–0
3	April 8	Cubs	0–2	Wells (1–0)	Hanson (0–1)	Mármol (1)	27,443	2:45	2–1
4	April 9	@ Giants	4–5(13)	Affeldt (2–0)	Medlen (0–1)		42,940	4:01	2–2
5	April 10	@ Giants	7–2	Lowe (2–0)	Wellemeyer (0–1)		42,985	3:06	3–2
6	April 11	@ Giants	3–6	Lincecum (2–0)	Kawakami (0–1)	Affeldt (1)	38,062	2:20	3–3
7	April 12	@ Padres	2–17	Correia (1–1)	Jurrjens (0–1)		42,843	3:06	3–4
8	April 14	@ Padres	6–1	Hanson (1–1)	Richard (0–2)		24,969	2:59	4–4
9	April 15	@ Padres	6–2	Hudson (1–0)	Latos (0–1)		16,356	3:01	5–4
10	April 16	Rockies	9–5	Lowe (3–0)	Hammel (0–1)		27,692	3:17	6–4
11	April 17	Rockies	0–4	Jiménez (3–0)	Kawakami (0–2)		32,602	2:31	6–5
12	April 18	Rockies	4–3	O'Flaherty (1–0)	Morales (0–1)		26,546	3:13	7–5
13	April 20	Phillies	4–3 (10)	Wagner (1–0)	Contreras (0–1)		18,032	3:12	8–5
14	April 21	Phillies	0–2	Halladay (4–0)	Hudson (1–1)		21,171	2:28	8–6
15	April 22	Phillies	3–8	Moyer (2–1)	Lowe (3–1)		22,476	3:17	8–7
16	April 23	@ Mets	2–5	Takahashi (1–1)	Kawakami (0–3)	Rodríguez (2)	32,265	3:02	8–8
17	April 24	@ Mets	1–3	Acosta (1–0)	Jurrjens (0–2)	Rodríguez (3)	36,547	2:45	8–9
18	April 25	@ Mets	0–1 (5)	Pelfrey (4–0)	Hanson (1–2)		27,623	1:58	8–10
19	April 26	@ Cardinals	4–3	Reyes (2–0)	Saito (0–1)	Franklin (7)	35,257	2:57	8–11
20	April 27	@ Cardinals	5–4	Carpenter (3–0)	Lowe (3–2)	Motte (1)	35,587	2:52	8–12
21	April 28	@ Cardinals	6–0	García (2–1)	Kawakami (0–4)		35,693	2:35	8–13
22	April 29	@ Cardinals	10–4	Wainwright (4–1)	Jurrjens (0–3)		39,561	2:33	8–14
23	April 30	Astros	4–2	Hanson (2–2)	Myers (1–2)	Wagner (2)	30,082	2:20	9–14

May (20–8)

#	Date	Opponent	Score	Win	Loss	Save	Attendance	Time	Record
24	May 1	Astros	10–1	Hudson (2–1)	Rodríguez (1–3)		27,035	2:52	10–14
25	May 2	Astros	7–1	Lowe (4–2)	Norris (1–3)		25,665	2:48	11–14
26	May 4	@ Nationals	3–6	Hernández (4–1)	Kawakami (0–5)	Capps (11)	17,098	3:06	11–15
27	May 5	@ Nationals	7–6 (10)	Kris Medlen (1–1)	Capps (0–1)	Wagner (3)	15,616	3:21	12–15
28	May 6	@ Nationals	2–3	Clippard (4–0)	O'Flaherty (1–1)		17,131	2:34	12–16
29	May 7	@ Phillies	0–7	Moyer (4–2)	Lowe (4–3)		45,349	2:17	12–17
30	May 8	@ Phillies	4–1	O'Flaherty (2–1)	Blanton (0–2)	Wagner (4)	45,395	3:11	13–17
31	May 9	@ Phillies	3–5	Hamels (3–2)	Kawakami (0–6)	Lidge (1)	45,193	2:36	13–18
32	May 10	@ Brewers	8–2	Hanson (3–2)	Davis (1–4)		24,365	2:51	14–18
33	May 11	@ Brewers	11–3	Hudson (3–1)	Bush (1–3)		30,678	3:31	15–18
34	May 12	@ Brewers	9–2	Lowe (5–3)	Parra (0–2)		30,175	3:09	16–18
35	May 14	Diamondbacks	6–5	Wagner (2–0)	Qualls (0–2)		30,657	3:24	17–18
36	May 15	Diamondbacks	1–11	Lopez (2–2)	Hanson (3–3)		32,718	2:54	17–19
37	May 16	Diamondbacks	13–1	Hudson (4–1)	Haren (4–3)		31,758	3:02	18–19
38	May 17	Mets	2–3	Pelfrey (5–1)	Lowe (5–4)	Rodríguez (6)	21,086	2:47	18–20
39	May 18	Mets	3–2	Wagner (3–0)	Feliciano (1–2)		27,119	2:46	19–20
40	May 19	Reds	5–4	Wagner (4–0)	Masset (3–2)		25,347	2:54	20–20
41	May 20	Reds	10–9	Kimbrel (1–0)	Cordero (1–3)		21,621	2:59	21–20
42	May 21	@ Pirates	7–0	Hudson (5–1)	Ohlendorf (0–2)		22,470	2:36	22–20
43	May 22	@ Pirates	4–2	Lowe (6–4)	Morton (1–8)	Wagner (5)	26,519	3:31	23–20
44	May 23	@ Pirates	2–3 (10)	Dotel (2–0)	Saito (0–2)		23,045	3:08	23–21
45	May 25	@ Marlins	4–6	Sánchez (4–2)	Kawakami (0–7)		11,434	2:55	23–22
46	May 26	@ Marlins	7–3	Hanson (4–3)	Badenhop (0–5)		15,238	2:55	24–22
47	May 27	@ Marlins	8–3	Moylan (2–0)	Nolasco (4–4)		11,381	3:31	25–22
48	May 28	Pirates	7–3	Lowe (7–4)	Duke (3–5)		23,442	2:26	26–22
49	May 29	Pirates	6–3	Medlen (2–1)	Burres (2–3)	Wagner (6)	29,134	2:50	27–22
50	May 30	Pirates	5–2	Saito (1–2)	Hanrahan (1–1)	Wagner (7)	31,078	2:54	28–22
51	May 31	Phillies	9–3	Hanson (5–3)	Blanton (1–4)		42,543	2:59	29–22

June (17–11)

#	Date	Opponent	Score	Win	Loss	Save	Attendance	Time	Record
52	June 1	Phillies	7–3	Hudson (6–1)	Hamels (5–4)	Wagner (8)	29,731	3:18	30–22
53	June 2	Phillies	2–1	Lowe (8–4)	Contreras (2–2)	Wagner (9)	26,309	2:28	31–22
54	June 3	@ Dodgers	4–3	Medlen (3–1)	Kuroda (5–4)	Venters (1)	35,333	2:55	32–22
55	June 4	@ Dodgers	4–5	Kuo (1–1)	Kawakami (0–8)	Broxton (14)	42,459	2:51	32–23
56	June 5	@ Dodgers	9–3	Hanson (6–3)	Billingsley (6–3)		48,207	3:35	33–23
57	June 6	@ Dodgers	4–5	Belisario (1–0)	Chavez (0–1)		37,944	3:37	33–24
58	June 7	@ Diamondbacks	4–7	Haren (6–4)	Lowe (8–5)	Qualls (11)	17,731	3:15	33–25
59	June 8	@ Diamondbacks	7–5	Venters (1–0)	Vásquez (0–2)	Wagner (10)	17,052	3:05	34–25
60	June 9	@ Diamondbacks	1–2	Heilman (2–1)	Moylan (2–1)	Qualls (12)	19,138	3:05	34–26
61	June 10	@ Diamondbacks	11–7	Moylan (3–1)	Qualls (1–3)		26,969	3:53	35–26
62	June 11	@ Twins	1–2	Liriano (6–3)	Hudson (6–2)	Rauch (16)	39,428	2:06	35–27
63	June 12	@ Twins	3–2	Venters (2–0)	Guerrier (1–2)	Wagner (11)	40,001	2:45	36–27
64	June 13	@ Twins	7–3	Medlen (4–1)	Slowey (7–4)		39,772	2:47	37–27
65	June 15	Rays	4–10	Price (10–2)	Kawakami (0–9)		30,448	3:30	37–28
66	June 16	Rays	6–2	Hanson (7–3)	Davis (5–7)		26,807	2:47	38–28
67	June 17	Rays	3–1	Hudson (7–2)	Shields (5–6)	Wagner (12)	30,427	2:24	39–28
68	June 18	Royals	6–4	Lowe (9–5)	Bannister (6–5)	Wagner (13)	29,808	2:42	40–28
69	June 19	Royals	5–4	Wagner (5–0)	Tejeda (2–3)		39,109	2:34	41–28
70	June 20	Royals	8–5	Kimbrel (2–0)	Wood (0–1)	Wagner (14)	30,072	3:13	42–28
71	June 22	@ White Sox	6–9	Danks (7–5)	Hanson (7–4)	Jenks (15)	28,773	2:38	42–29
72	June 23	@ White Sox	2–4	Buehrle (6–6)	Hudson (7–3)	Jenks (16)	27,561	2:20	42–30
73	June 24	@ White Sox	0–2	Putz (3–2)	Saito (1–3)	Jenks (17)	31,076	2:17	42–31
74	June 25	Tigers	3–1	Medlen (5–1)	Oliver (0–1)	Wagner (15)	36,634	2:39	43–31
75	June 26	Tigers	4–3	Kawakami (1–9)	Zumaya (2–1)	Moylan (1)	39,184	3:23	44–31
76	June 27	Tigers	4–10	Verlander (9–5)	Hanson (7–5)		26,034	3:14	44–32
77	June 28	Nationals	5–0	Hudson (8–3)	Strasburg (2–2)		42,889	2:57	45–32
78	June 29	Nationals	2–7	Stammen (2–2)	Lowe (9–6)		19,045	2:59	45–33
79	June 30	Nationals	4–1	Jurrjens (1–3)	Martin (0–4)	Wagner (16)	20,091	2:57	46–33

July (13–11)

#	Date	Opponent	Score	Win	Loss	Save	Attendance	Time	Record
80	July 2	Marlins	4–3 (11)	Venters (3–0)	Núñez (3–2)		34,332	3:20	47–33
81	July 3	Marlins	4–1	Hanson (8–5)	Sánchez (7–5)	Wagner (17)	30,148	2:46	48–33
82	July 4	Marlins	2–3	Nolasco (8–6)	Hudson (8–4)	Núñez (17)	44,163	2:55	48–34
83	July 5	@ Phillies	1–3	Halladay (10–7)	Lowe (9–7)		45,404	2:14	48–35
84	July 6	@ Phillies	6–3 (11)	Chavez (1–1)	Herndon (0–2)	Wagner (18)	44,715	3:31	49–35
85	July 7	@ Phillies	7–5	Medlen (6–1)	Moyer (9–8)	Wagner (19)	44,282	2:53	50–35
86	July 9	@ Mets	4–2	O'Flaherty (3–1)	Dickey (6–2)	Wagner (20)	36,356	3:06	51–35
87	July 10	@ Mets	4–0	Hudson (9–4)	Pelfrey (10–4)		37,793	3:03	52–35
88	July 11	@ Mets	0–3	Santana (7–5)	Lowe (9–8)	Rodríguez (21)	36,402	2:50	52–36
–	July 13	2010 Major League Baseball All-Star Game in Anaheim, California							
89	July 15	Brewers	2–1	Jurrjens (2–3)	Bush (4–7)	Wagner (21)	35,057	2:46	53–36
90	July 16	Brewers	3–9	Wolf (7–8)	Hanson (8–6)		37,014	3:08	53–37
91	July 17	Brewers	3–6	Narveson (8–6)	Hudson (9–5)	Axford (11)	48,174	2:52	53–38
92	July 18	Brewers	11–6	Lowe (10–8)	Parra (3–7)		24,732	3:01	54–38
93	July 20	Padres	4–1	Jurrjens (3–3)	LeBlanc (4–8)	Wagner (22)	30,621	2:37	55–38
94	July 21	Padres	4–6 (12)	Stauffer (3–1)	Medlen (6–2)	Bell (27)	30,039	4:13	55–39
95	July 22	Padres	8–0	Hudson (10–5)	Richard (7–5)		26,450	2:55	56–39
96	July 23	@ Marlins	6–7	Veras (2–0)	Wagner (5–1)		19,204	3:40	56–40
97	July 24	@ Marlins	10–5	Chavez (2–1)	Mariñez (1–1)		30,245	3:01	57–40
98	July 25	@ Marlins	4–5 (11)	Sosa (2–2)	Chavez (2–2)		17,321	3:22	57–41
99	July 27	@ Nationals	0–3	Batista (1–2)	Hanson (8–7)	Capps (25)	40,043	2:24	57–41
100	July 28	@ Nationals	3–1	Hudson (11–5)	Hernández (7–7)	Wagner (23)	24,263	2:55	58–42
101	July 29	@ Nationals	3–5	Olsen (3–2)	Lowe (10–9)	Capps (26)	30,263	2:33	58–43
102	July 30	@ Reds	6–4 (10)	Chavez (3–2)	Cordero (3–4)	Wagner (24)	40,373	3:46	59–43
103	July 31	@ Reds	2–5	Arroyo (11–6)	Jurrjens (3–4)	Cordero (28)	41,611	2:53	59–44

August (18–11)

#	Date	Opponent	Score	Win	Loss	Save	Attendance	Time	Record
104	August 1	@ Reds	1–2	Vólquez (2–1)	Hanson (8–8)	Cordero (29)	40,871	2:48	59–45
105	August 2	Mets	4–1	Hudson (12–5)	Santana (8–6)	Wagner (25)	33,030	3:00	60–45
106	August 3	Mets	2–3	Acosta (2–1)	Wagner (5–2)	Rodríguez (23)	26,578	2:53	60–46
107	August 4	Mets	8–3	Dunn (1–0)	Pelfrey (10–6)		28,536	3:05	61–46
108	August 5	Giants	3–2	Jurrjens (4–4)	Lincecum (11–5)	Wagner (26)	24,538	2:37	62–46
109	August 6	Giants	2–3 (11)	López (3–2)	Moylan (3–2)	Wilson (32)	42,178	3:12	62–47
110	August 7	Giants	3–0	Hudson (13–5)	Cain (9–9)	Wagner (27)	47,305	2:23	63–47
111	August 8	Giants	6–3	Lowe (11–9)	Sánchez (8–7)	Saito (1)	33,865	2:59	64–47
112	August 9	@ Astros	4–10	Byrdak (2–1)	Farnsworth (0–1)		34,684	2:53	64–48
113	August 10	@ Astros	4–2	Venters (4–0)	Lindstrom (2–3)	Wagner (28)	34,155	2:47	65–48
114	August 11	@ Astros	8–2 (10)	Wagner (6–2)	Lyon (6–5)		31,352	3:01	66–48
115	August 13	Dodgers	1–0	Hudson (14–5)	Kuroda (8–11)	Wagner (29)	38,602	2:31	67–48
116	August 14	Dodgers	1–2	Lilly (6–8)	Lowe (11–10)	Kuo (4)	49,267	3:07	67–49
117	August 15	Dodgers	13–1	Jurrjens (5–4)	Padilla (6–4)		28,105	2:59	68–49
118	August 16	Dodgers	4–3	Moylan (4–2)	Kuo (3–2)		20,414	3:13	69–49
119	August 17	Nationals	10–2	Minor (1–0)	Olsen (3–5)		16,911	3:04	70–49
120	August 18	Nationals	3–2	Wagner (7–2)	Burnett (0–7)		18,105	2:43	71–49
121	August 19	Nationals	2–6	Lannan (5–5)	Lowe (11–11)		15,593	3:00	71–50
122	August 20	@ Cubs	5–3	Moylan (5–2)	Mármol (2–3)	Wagner (30)	39,345	2:35	72–50
123	August 21	@ Cubs	4–5	Gorzelanny (7–7)	Hanson (8–9)	Mármol (22)	41,099	2:59	72–51
124	August 22	@ Cubs	16–5	Minor (2–0)	Wells (5–12)		37,518	2:54	73–51
125	August 23	@ Rockies	4–5	Betancourt (4–1)	Venters (4–1)	Street (11)	34,172	2:50	73–52
126	August 24	@ Rockies	2–5	de la Rosa (5–4)	Lowe (11–12)	Street (12)	34,485	2:35	73–53
127	August 25	@ Rockies	10–12	Belisle (6–4)	Venters (4–2)		27,625	3:22	73–54
128	August 27	Marlins	1–7	Volstad (8–9)	Hanson (8–10)		29,722	2:31	73–55
129	August 28	Marlins	12–3	Hudson (15–5)	Nolasco (14–9)		43,846	2:51	74–55
130	August 29	Marlins	7–6	Saito (2–3)	Núñez (4–3)		38,170	3:15	75–55
131	August 30	Mets	9–3	Jurrjens (6–4)	Misch (0–4)		18,842	3:12	76–55
132	August 31	Mets	9–2	Minor (3–0)	Niese (8–7)		18,430	2:47	77–55

September (13–14)

#	Date	Opponent	Score	Win	Loss	Save	Attendance	Time	Record
133	September 1	Mets	4–1	Hanson (9–10)	Pelfrey (13–8)	Wagner (31)	19,938	2:31	78–55
134	September 2	Mets	2–4	Santana (11–9)	Hudson (15–6)	Takahashi (3)	24,895	2:46	78–56
135	September 3	@ Marlins	1–6	Miller (1–0)	Kawakami (1–10)		19,226	2:50	78–57
136	September 4	@ Marlins	2–0	Jurrjens (7–4)	Johnson (11–6)	Wagner (32)	23,912	2:49	79–57
137	September 5	@ Marlins	6–7 (10)	Badenhop (2–5)	O'Flaherty (3–2)		19,504	3:25	79–58
138	September 6	@ Pirates	1–3	Burres (3–3)	Hanson (9–11)	Hanrahan (4)	15,330	2:42	79–59
139	September 7	@ Pirates	0–5	McDonald (3–5)	Hudson (15–7)		11,070	2:24	79–60
140	September 8	@ Pirates	9–3	Lowe (12–12)	Duke (7–13)		13,113	3:10	80–60
141	September 9	Cardinals	4–11	Wainwright (18–10)	Jurrjens (7–5)		20,776	2:44	80–61
142	September 10	Cardinals	8–6	Moylan (6–2)	Carpenter (15–6)	Wagner (33)	40,656	3:04	81–61
143	September 11	Cardinals	6–3 (12)	Kimbrel (3–0)	Boggs (2–3)		51,078	4:01	82–61
144	September 12	Cardinals	3–7	Lohse (3–7)	Hudson (15–8)		27,156	3:15	82–62
145	September 13	Nationals	4–0	Lowe (13–12)	Maya (0–2)		18,647	2:13	83–62
146	September 14	Nationals	0–6	Hernández (10–11)	Jurrjens (7–6)		26,954	2:39	83–63
147	September 15	Nationals	2–4	Lannan (8–7)	Minor (3–1)	Storen (4)	19,237	2:53	83–64
148	September 17	@ Mets	6–4	Hanson (10–11)	Niese (9–9)	Wagner (34)	28,002	2:36	84–64
149	September 18	@ Mets	4–2	Hudson (16–8)	Gee (1–1)	Wagner (35)	33,051	2:28	85–64
150	September 19	@ Mets	6–3	Lowe (14–12)	Dickey (11–7)	Kimbrel (1)	33,612	2:57	86–64
151	September 20	@ Phillies	1–3	Hamels (12–10)	Beachy (0–1)	Lidge (24)	45,256	2:45	86–65
152	September 21	@ Phillies	3–5	Halladay (20–10)	Minor (3–2)	Lidge (25)	45,264	3:00	86–66
153	September 22	@ Phillies	0–1	Madson (6–2)	Venters (4–3)	Lidge (26)	45,310	2:47	86–67
154	September 24	@ Nationals	3–8	Zimmermann (1–2)	Hudson (16–9)		22,515	3:08	86–68
155	September 25	@ Nationals	5–0	Lowe (15–12)	Maya (0–3)		23,824	3:04	87–68
156	September 26	@ Nationals	2–4	Burnett (1–7)	Farnsworth (0–2)	Storen (5)	21,625	2:55	87–69
157	September 27	Marlins	2–1 (11)	Dunn (2–0)	Veras (3–3)		26,338	3:17	88–69
158	September 28	Marlins	3–2	Kimbrel (4–0)	Sánchez (12–12)	Wagner (36)	36,135	2:44	89–69
159	September 29	Marlins	5–1	Lowe (16–12)	Miller (1–5)		36,390	2:52	90–69

October (1–2)

#	Date	Opponent	Score	Win	Loss	Save	Attendance	Time	Record
160	October 1	Phillies	5–11	Kendrick (11–10)	Beachy (0–2)		51,139	3:35	90–70
161	October 2	Phillies	0–7	Bastardo (2–0)	Venters (4–4)		54,296	3:26	90–71
162	October 3	Phillies	8–7	Hudson (17–9)	Báez (3–4)	Wagner (37)	52,613	2:54	91–71

=== Composite box score ===
Inning	1	2	3	4	5	6	7	8	9	10	11	12	13	Total
Atlanta Braves	83	70	74	70	82	93	105	82	60	10	6	3	0	738
Opponents	67	79	63	74	69	75	88	67	38	2	4	2	1	629

- Source: Baseball Reference

=== Midseason transactions ===
Date	Team	Acquired by Braves	Traded from Braves
July 14	Toronto Blue Jays	SS Álex González; LHP Tim Collins; SS Tyler Pastornicky	SS Yunel Escobar; LHP Jo-Jo Reyes
July 31	Detroit Tigers	OF Wilkin Ramírez	Player to be named
July 31	Kansas City Royals	OF Rick Ankiel; RHP Kyle Farnsworth	OF Gregor Blanco; RHP Jesse Chavez; LHP Tim Collins
August 18	Chicago Cubs	1B Derrek Lee	RHP Robinson Lopez; RHP Tyrelle Harris; LHP Jeffrey Lorick

=== Accolades and awards ===
See: Atlanta Braves award winners and league leaders

==== Regular season ====
All-Star

- Brian McCann (MVP) – reserve (5th All-Star Game)
- Martín Prado – starter (1st All-Star Game)
- Jason Heyward – starter (Didn't start, Injured) (1st All-Star Game)
- Tim Hudson – reserve (3rd All-Star Game)
- Omar Infante – reserve (1st All-Star Game)
- Billy Wagner – reserve (Didn't play, Injured) (7th All Star Game)

MLB Player of the Month

- Troy Glaus – May; Player of the Month for the National League

MLB Pitcher of the Month

- Tim Hudson – August; Pitcher of the Month for the National League
- Derek Lowe – September; Pitcher of the Month for the National League

MLB Rookie of the Month

- Jason Heyward – April & May; Rookie of the Month for the National League

MLB Player of the Week

- Martín Prado – May 10–16; Player of the Week for the National League
- Omar Infante – August 16–22; Player of the Week for the National League

==== Postseason ====
MLB Comeback Player of the Year Award

- Tim Hudson – 2010 Comeback Player of the Year for the National League

=== Record vs. opponents ===
2010 National League record Source: MLB Standings Grid – 2010
Team	AZ	ATL	CHC	CIN	COL	FLA	HOU	LAD	MIL	NYM	PHI	PIT	SD	SF	STL	WSH	AL
Arizona	–	3–4	1–6	2–5	9–9	3–3	4–3	5–13	3–4	5–1	2–4	2–4	8–10	5–13	4–5	3–4	6–9
Atlanta	4–3	–	4–2	3–2	2–4	11–7	5–1	5–3	5–2	11–7	8–10	6–3	4–2	4–3	2–6	8–10	9–6
Chicago	6–1	2–4	–	4–12	2–3	4–2	7–11	3–4	9–6	3–4	4–2	5–10	3–5	2–5	9–6	4–2	8–10
Cincinnati	5–2	2–3	12–4	–	2–5	5–2	10–5	5–4	11–3	4–2	2–5	10–6	2–4	3–4	6–12	4–3	8–7
Colorado	9–9	4–2	3–2	5–2	–	3–4	2–4	7–11	5–4	3–3	1–6	3–4	12–6	9–9	3–4	5–3	9–6
Florida	3–3	7–11	2–4	2–5	4–3	–	3–3	4–2	4–4	12–6	5–13	6–2	3–6	2–5	3–2	13–5	7–8
Houston	3–4	1–5	11–7	5–10	4–2	3–3	–	2–4	8–7	3–4	4–3	11–4	2–5	2–7	10–5	4–4	3–12
Los Angeles	13–5	3–5	4–3	4–5	11–7	2–4	4–2	–	4–2	3–4	2–4	4–3	8–10	8–10	3–4	3–3	4–11
Milwaukee	4–3	2–5	6–9	3–11	4–5	4–4	7–8	2–4	–	5–2	1–5	13–5	3–4	2–5	8–7	4–2	9–6
New York	1–5	7–11	4–3	2–4	3–3	6–12	4–3	4–3	2–5	–	9–9	6–1	3–3	3–4	3–3	9–9	13–5
Philadelphia	4–2	10–8	2–4	5–2	6–1	13–5	3–4	4–2	5–1	9–9	–	2–4	5–2	3–3	4–4	12–6	10–8
Pittsburgh	4–2	3–6	10–5	6–10	4–3	2–6	4–11	3–4	5–13	1–6	4–2	–	0–6	2–4	6–9	1–5	2–13
San Diego	10–8	2–4	5–3	4–2	6–12	6–3	5–2	10–8	4–3	3–3	2–5	6–0	–	12–6	3–4	3–3	9–6
San Francisco	13–5	3–4	5–2	4–3	9–9	5–2	7–2	10–8	5–2	4–3	3–3	4–2	6–12	–	3–3	4–2	7–8
St. Louis	5–4	6–2	6–9	12–6	4–3	2–3	5–10	4–3	7–8	3–3	4–4	9–6	4–3	3–3	–	3–3	9–6
Washington	4–3	10–8	2–4	3–4	3–5	5–13	4–4	3–3	2–4	9–9	6–12	5–1	3–3	2–4	3–3	–	5–13

== Postseason ==
2010 Postseason Game Log
National League Division Series (1–3)

#	Date	Opponent	Score	Win	Loss	Save	Attendance	Time	Record
1	October 7	@ Giants	0–1	Lincecum (1–0)	Lowe (0–1)	None	43,936	2:26	0–1
2	October 8	@ Giants	5–4 (11)	Farnsworth (1–0)	Ramírez (0–1)	None	44,046	3:47	1–1
3	October 10	Giants	2–3	Romo (1–0)	Kimbrel (0–1)	Wilson (1)	53,284	3:23	1–2
4	October 11	Giants	2–3	Bumgarner (1–0)	Lowe (0–2)	Wilson (2)	44,532	2:56	1–3

=== National League Division Series ===
As National League Wild Card winner, the Braves faced the San Francisco Giants in the 2010 National League Division Series. It was the first postseason appearance for the Braves since the 2005 team was eliminated after four games in the 2005 NLDS versus the Houston Astros.

==== Game 1 ====
Thursday, October 7, 2010 – 9:37 p.m. (ET) at AT&T Park in San Francisco, California
Starting pitchers: Derek Lowe (Braves) & Tim Lincecum (Giants).

Team	1	2	3	4	5	6	7	8	9	R	H	E
Atlanta	0	0	0	0	0	0	0	0	0	0	2	2
San Francisco	0	0	0	1	0	0	0	0	X	1	5	0
WP: Tim Lincecum (1–0) LP: Derek Lowe (0–1) Sv: None; Home runs: ATL: None; SFO: None

The first game of the NLDS was a pitching duel that matched the Giants' two-time Cy Young Award winner Tim Lincecum, in his first postseason start, against the Braves' Derek Lowe, a seasoned veteran of postseason play.

The game's only run came in the fourth inning. Giants rookie catcher Buster Posey singled to left, stole second on a controversial play where he was called safe while appearing to be out, and then scored on a two-out single by Cody Ross. The run was the only one Lincecum needed, as the Giants' ace was dominant, pitching a complete game shutout, allowing only two hits and striking out a franchise record 14 while walking only one. Lowe pitched only 5 1/3 innings before being lifted for the bullpen. Jonny Venters, Peter Moylan, Michael Dunn, and Craig Kimbrel combined to pitch the final 2 2/3 innings of the Braves loss.

==== Game 2 ====
Friday, October 8, 2010 – 9:37 p.m. (ET) at AT&T Park in San Francisco, California
Starting pitchers: Tommy Hanson (Braves) & Matt Cain (Giants).

Team	1	2	3	4	5	6	7	8	9	10	11	R	H	E
Atlanta	0	0	0	0	0	1	0	3	0	0	1	5	11	0
San Francisco	3	1	0	0	0	0	0	0	0	0	0	4	10	2
WP: Kyle Farnsworth (1–0) LP: Ramón Ramírez (0–1) Sv: None; Home runs: ATL: Rick Ankiel (1); SFO: Pat Burrell (1)

The Giants jumped on the board in the bottom of the first inning, taking a quick 3–0 lead as Pat Burrell hit a three-run home run, following a Freddy Sanchez single and a Buster Posey walk.

Braves manager Bobby Cox was ejected from the game in the top of the second inning, arguing that Giants first baseman Aubrey Huff's foot did not stay on base on an Álex González ground-out. In the bottom of the second, Giants starter Matt Cain also hit an RBI single, scoring Cody Ross, who had doubled earlier. The Giants led the Braves after two innings by a 4–0 score.

Braves first baseman Derrek Lee hit a lead-off single in the top of the sixth inning and advanced to second base on Pat Burrell's fielding error. Brian McCann singled him home in the next at-bat to end the 14 scoreless innings streak for the Braves in the series.

The Braves struck back in the top of the eighth inning. After consecutive singles by Lee and McCann, the Giants brought in closer Brian Wilson for a six-out save; however, the next hitter, Melky Cabrera, hit an RBI ground ball that scored Lee from third base and Cabrera beat the throw to first base due to Giants' third baseman Pablo Sandoval's throwing error. Following Brooks Conrad's sacrifice bunt, Álex González's RBI double scored both runners and tied the game at 4–4.

The game remained tied and went to extra innings. In the bottom of the tenth inning, two consecutive bunts (one resulting in a single, one sacrifice) knocked Braves closer Billy Wagner out of the game because of injury. Because Wagner retired following the 2010 season, it was the last time Wagner ever appeared in a Major League game. Relieving the injured Wagner, Kyle Farnsworth hit the next batter, Freddy Sanchez, then walked Huff to load the bases. With the winning run at third base and one out, Posey followed by grounding into a double play to end the inning.

In the top of the eleventh inning, Rick Ankiel hit a go-ahead solo home run into McCovey Cove on the fly to give the Braves a 5–4 lead, their first lead in the series. Farnsworth threw a scoreless bottom of the eleventh inning for the save and handed the Braves their first (and ultimately only) win in the series. The NLDS was tied one game apiece as it headed to Atlanta.

==== Game 3 ====
Sunday, October 10, 2010 – 4:37 p.m. (ET) at Turner Field in Atlanta, Georgia
Starting pitchers: Jonathan Sánchez (Giants) & Tim Hudson (Braves).

Team	1	2	3	4	5	6	7	8	9	R	H	E
San Francisco	0	1	0	0	0	0	0	0	2	3	8	0
Atlanta	0	0	0	0	0	0	0	2	0	2	4	3
WP: Sergio Romo (1–0) LP: Craig Kimbrel (0–1) Sv: Brian Wilson (1); Home runs: SFO: None; ATL: Eric Hinske (1)

Game 3 was yet another dramatic matchup of strong pitching. The Braves sent right-handed veteran Tim Hudson to the mound to face Giants lefty Jonathan Sánchez. The Giants took an early lead in the top of the second inning after leaving the bases loaded in the first. Third baseman Mike Fontenot started the inning by driving a triple off the right field wall. Cody Ross, the next batter, lofted a pop fly that was dropped by Atlanta second baseman Brooks Conrad, giving San Francisco a 1–0 lead. Hudson rebounded by pitching seven strong innings, allowing only the one unearned run. Sánchez pitched a no-hitter through five innings against the Braves. With one out in the bottom of the sixth, Braves starter Hudson collected the team's first hit, a single to right field. Sánchez kept the Braves off the scoreboard until he was lifted with one out in the eighth.

With a runner at first and one out in the bottom of the eighth inning and the Giants still nursing their 1–0 lead, Giants setup man Sergio Romo, a right-hander, relieved Sánchez to face the right-handed Troy Glaus as a pinch-hitter. Braves manager Bobby Cox countered by sending left-handed utility man Eric Hinske to the plate instead. With two strikes on him, Hinske turned on a hanging slider from Romo and drove it just inside the right field foul pole for a home run, giving the Braves a 2–1 lead and electrifying the crowd at Turner Field.

Rookie right-hander Craig Kimbrel came out of the bullpen to start the top of the ninth for the Braves, relieving Jonny Venters, who had struck out the side the previous inning. Kimbrel retired Ross on a popout to Conrad for the first out. Travis Ishikawa then pinch-hit for Romo and drew a walk. After striking out leadoff man Andrés Torres, Kimbrel gave up a single to second baseman Freddy Sanchez and was removed from the game, leaving runners on first and second base with two outs. Another rookie Brave, lefty Michael Dunn came on and gave up a game-tying single to Aubrey Huff. Dunn was then pulled for a right-hander, Peter Moylan, who induced a grounder from Buster Posey, which proceeded to bounce through the legs of Conrad, the second baseman's third error of the game. Sanchez scored on the play, giving the Giants a 3–2 lead. Conrad's three errors set a NLDS record for most errors in a single game. Kyle Farnsworth came on and got the third out, but the damage was done.

The Giants brought in their closer Brian Wilson for the bottom of the ninth. He held the lead, giving up a single to Brian McCann, but retiring Nate McLouth on a grounder to end the game. After being one strike away from a commanding 2–1 series lead, the Braves found themselves facing elimination with another loss.

==== Game 4 ====
Monday, October 11, 2010 – 7:37 p.m. (ET) at Turner Field in Atlanta, Georgia
Starting pitchers: Madison Bumgarner (Giants) & Derek Lowe (Braves)

Team	1	2	3	4	5	6	7	8	9	R	H	E
San Francisco	0	0	0	0	0	1	2	0	0	3	5	1
Atlanta	0	0	1	0	0	1	0	0	0	2	7	2
WP: Madison Bumgarner (1–0) LP: Derek Lowe (0–2) Sv: Brian Wilson (2); Home runs: SFO: Cody Ross (1); ATL: Brian McCann (1)

With their backs against the wall, the Braves sent Derek Lowe to the mound on three days' rest. The Braves scored first in the bottom of the third inning when Brian McCann hit a sacrifice fly that drove in Omar Infante.

Lowe took a no-hitter into the sixth inning, but the Giants tied the game with one out on Cody Ross' first-pitch homer off of a Lowe cutter. McCann answered with a home run of his own in the bottom of the inning off the Giants' rookie starter, Madison Bumgarner, to take back the lead.

Lowe was relieved after 6 1/3 innings. After walking Aubrey Huff and allowing an infield single to Buster Posey, Bobby Cox made his way out to the mound, apparently to remove Lowe from the game; however, after talking to him, Cox elected to leave Lowe in, prompting huge cheers from the Atlanta fans. The next batter, Pat Burrell, walked on a 3–1 pitch near the inside corner and Lowe's night was done. He struck out eight while allowing only two hits and walking two. Braves' relievers Peter Moylan and Jonny Venters could not hold the lead as the Giants scored two runs in the top of the seventh inning on Juan Uribe's RBI fielder's choice and Cody Ross' RBI single. The Braves had an opportunity to escape the one-out, bases-loaded jam; however, Álex González's throwing error, his second in the game, cost them. Both of the errors were debatable. The first was a ball hit into the hole that he didn't field cleanly with the speedy Andrés Torres running. The second was another crucial controversial call that went against the Braves in the series. With two on and one out Juan Uribe hit a weak groundball to González. González elected to go to second but threw it high, causing Omar Infante to edge up; however, the umpire ruled he came off the base.

Left-handed Giants reliever Javier López entered the game with two outs in the eighth, and pinch-runner Nate McLouth as the tying run at second base. López struck out Jason Heyward to end the inning. In the bottom of the ninth inning, the Braves had one last chance to rally. With one out, Giants closer Brian Wilson walked Rick Ankiel and Eric Hinske to put the winning run on base. Omar Infante followed by striking out swinging and Melky Cabrera grounded out to end the game and the series. The Giants won the series three games to one.

After twenty-five overall seasons as the manager for the Braves, Game 4 proved to be the last game for the retiring Bobby Cox. After the game ended, he came out of the dugout briefly to acknowledge the fans. He was greeted with loud cheers from the entire stadium, as well as an ovation from the Giants' players and coaches.

== Roster ==
2010 Atlanta Braves
Roster
Pitchers: 37 Brandon Beachy; 43 Jesse Chavez; 38 Michael Dunn; 43 Kyle Farnsworth; 48 Tommy Hanson; 15 Tim Hudson; 49 Jair Jurrjens; 11 Kenshin Kawakami; 46 Craig Kimbrel; 32 Derek Lowe; 50 Cristhian Martínez; 54 Kris Medlen; 56 Mike Minor; 58 Peter Moylan; 34 Eric O'Flaherty; 36 Scott Proctor; 56 Chris Resop; 37 Jo-Jo Reyes; 40 Takashi Saito; 39 Jonny Venters; 13 Billy Wagner	Catchers: 33 J. C. Boscán; 16 Brian McCann; 8 David Ross; Infielders: 26 Brooks Conrad; 19 Yunel Escobar; 5 Freddie Freeman; 25 Troy Glaus; 2 Álex González; 19 Diory Hernández; 18 Brandon Hicks; 4 Omar Infante; 10 Chipper Jones; 27 Derrek Lee; 14 Martín Prado; Outfielders: 28 Rick Ankiel; 1 Gregor Blanco; 53 Melky Cabrera; 27 Brent Clevlen; 23 Matt Diaz; 22 Jason Heyward; 20 Eric Hinske; 24 Nate McLouth	Manager: 6 Bobby Cox; Coaches: 52 Chino Cadahia (bench); 17 Glenn Hubbard (first base); 45 Roger McDowell (pitching); 9 Terry Pendleton (hitting); 12 Eddie Pérez (bullpen); 51 Brian Snitker (third base)

== Player stats ==
Stats through the end of the 2010 regular season

* = Acquired Mid-Season

† = No longer with Braves

"()" = Stats with Braves

=== Batting ===
Note: G = Games played; AB = At bats; R = Runs; H = Hits; Avg. = Batting average; HR = Home runs; RBI = Runs batted in

Player	G	AB	R	H	Avg.	HR	RBI
Rick Ankiel *	74(47)	211(119)	31(17)	49(25)	.232(.210)	6(2)	24(9)
Gregor Blanco †	36	58	9	18	.310	0	3
J. C. Boscán	1	0	1	0	.000	0	0
Melky Cabrera	147	458	50	117	.255	4	42
Brent Clevlen	4	4	2	1	.250	0	0
Brooks Conrad	103	156	31	39	.250	8	33
Matt Diaz	84	224	27	56	.250	7	31
Yunel Escobar †	75	261	28	62	.238	0	19
Freddie Freeman	20	24	3	4	.167	1	1
Troy Glaus	128	412	52	99	.240	16	71
Álex González *	157(72)	595(267)	74(27)	149(64)	.250(.240)	23(6)	88(38)
Diory Hernández	20	9	5	1	.111	1	1
Jason Heyward	142	520	83	144	.277	18	72
Brandon Hicks	16	5	7	0	.000	0	0
Eric Hinske	131	281	38	72	.256	11	51
Omar Infante	134	471	65	151	.321	8	47
Chipper Jones	95	317	47	84	.265	10	46
Derrek Lee *	148(39)	547(129)	80(17)	142(37)	.260(.287)	19(3)	80(24)
Brian McCann	143	479	63	129	.269	21	77
Nate McLouth	85	242	30	46	.190	6	24
Martín Prado	140	599	100	184	.307	15	66
David Ross	59	121	15	35	.289	2	28
Pitcher totals	162	307	21	43	.140	0	16
Team totals	162	5463	738	1411	.258	139	699

=== Pitching ===
Note: G = Games pitched; IP = Innings pitched; W = Wins; L = Losses; ERA = Earned run average; SO= Strikeouts; WHIP = Walks+hits per inning pitched

==== Starting pitchers ====
Player	G	IP	W	L	ERA	SO	WHIP
Tim Hudson	34	228.2	17	9	2.83	139	1.15
Tommy Hanson	34	202.2	10	11	3.33	173	1.17
Derek Lowe	33	193.2	16	12	4.00	99	1.37
Jair Jurrjens	20	116.1	7	6	4.64	86	1.39
Kenshin Kawakami	16	85.1	1	10	4.85	59	1.45
Kris Medlen	14	84.0	5	0	3.86	62	1.21
Mike Minor	8	39.1	3	2	6.18	41	1.55
Brandon Beachy	3	15.0	0	2	3.00	7	1.53

==== Relief pitchers ====
Note: G = Games pitched; W = Wins; L = Losses; SV = Saves; IP = Innings pitched; ERA = Earned run average; SO = Strikeouts; WHIP = Walks+hits per inning pitched

Player	G	W	L	SV	IP	ERA	SO	WHIP
Jonny Venters	79	4	4	1	83.0	1.95	93	1.20
Billy Wagner	71	7	2	37	69.1	1.43	104	0.87
Kyle Farnsworth	60(23)	3(0)	2(2)	0(0)	64.2(20.0)	3.34(5.40)	61(25)	1.14(1.10)
Peter Moylan	85	6	2	1	63.2	2.97	52	1.41
Takashi Saito	56	2	3	1	54.0	2.83	69	1.07
Eric O'Flaherty	56	3	2	0	44.0	2.45	36	1.25
Jesse Chavez †	28	3	2	0	36.2	5.89	29	1.42
Cristhian Martínez	18	0	0	0	26.0	4.85	22	1.31
Kris Medlen	17	1	2	0	23.2	3.04	21	1.14
Craig Kimbrel	21	4	0	1	20.2	0.44	40	1.21
Mike Dunn	25	2	0	0	19.0	1.89	27	1.68
Scott Proctor	6	0	0	0	5.2	6.35	6	1.41
Jo-Jo Reyes †	1	0	0	0	3.1	24.30	2	3.90
Chris Resop †	1	0	0	0	2.0	22.50	2	4.00
Kenshin Kawakami	2	0	0	0	2.0	18.00	0	3.00
Mike Minor	1	0	0	0	1.1	0.00	2	2.25
Total Team Pitching	162	91	71	41	1439.1	3.56	1241	1.27

== Farm system ==
Level	Team	League	Manager
AAA	Gwinnett Braves	International League	Dave Brundage
AA	Mississippi Braves	Southern League	Phillip Wellman
A	Myrtle Beach Pelicans	Carolina League	Rocket Wheeler
A	Rome Braves	South Atlantic League	Randy Ingle
Rookie	Danville Braves	Appalachian League	Paul Runge
Rookie	GCL Braves	Gulf Coast League	Luis Ortiz
