= 2010 National League Division Series =

American baseball games

Teams
Team (Wins)		Manager	Season
Philadelphia Phillies (3)		Charlie Manuel	97–65 (.599), GA: 6
Cincinnati Reds (0)		Dusty Baker	91–71 (.562), GA: 5
- Dates: October 6–10
- Television: TBS
- TV announcers: Brian Anderson and Joe Simpson
- Radio: ESPN
- Radio announcers: Jon Sciambi and Dave Campbell
- Umpires: John Hirschbeck, Bruce Dreckman, Sam Holbrook, Ed Rapuano, Gary Cederstrom, Rob Drake

Teams
Team (Wins)		Manager	Season
San Francisco Giants (3)		Bruce Bochy	92–70 (.568), GA: 2
Atlanta Braves (1)		Bobby Cox	91–71 (.562), GB: 6
- Dates: October 7–11
- Television: TBS
- TV announcers: Dick Stockton and Bob Brenly
- Radio: ESPN
- Radio announcers: Chris Berman (in San Francisco), Dave O'Brien (in Atlanta), and Rick Sutcliffe
- Umpires: Dana DeMuth, Paul Nauert, Paul Emmel, Mike Winters, Jerry Layne, Ed Hickox

The 2010 National League Division Series (NLDS) were two best-of-five playoff series in Major League Baseball’s 2010 postseason to determine the participating teams in the 2010 National League Championship Series. The three divisional winners and a fourth team—a "Wild Card"—played in two series from October 6 to 11. TBS televised all games in the United States.

Under MLB's playoff format, no two teams from the same division were matched up in the Division Series, regardless of whether their records would normally indicate such a matchup. Home field advantage went to the team with the better regular-season record with the exception of the wild card team, which defers home field advantage regardless of record. The matchups were:

- (1) Philadelphia Phillies (NL East champions) vs. (3) Cincinnati Reds (NL Central champions): Phillies won the series, 3–0.
- (2) San Francisco Giants (NL West champions) vs. (4) Atlanta Braves (Wild Card qualifier): Giants won the series, 3–1.

The Phillies and Reds had met in the postseason once before: in the 1976 NLCS, which the Reds won 3–0. The Giants and Braves also had one prior postseason series—the 2002 NLDS—which the Giants won 3–2.

The Giants would go on to defeat the Phillies in the NLCS, then win the 2010 World Series by defeating the American League champion Texas Rangers, winning their first World title since 1954.

== Matchups ==
=== Philadelphia Phillies vs. Cincinnati Reds ===
Philadelphia won the series, 3–0.

Game	Date	Score	Location	Time	Attendance
1	October 6	Cincinnati Reds – 0, Philadelphia Phillies – 4^{†}	Citizens Bank Park	2:34	46,411
2	October 8	Cincinnati Reds – 4, Philadelphia Phillies – 7	Citizens Bank Park	3:39	46,511
3	October 10	Philadelphia Phillies – 2, Cincinnati Reds – 0	Great American Ball Park	3:00	44,599

†: No-hitter by Roy Halladay

=== San Francisco Giants vs. Atlanta Braves ===
San Francisco won the series, 3–1.

Game	Date	Score	Location	Time	Attendance
1	October 7	Atlanta Braves – 0, San Francisco Giants – 1	AT&T Park	2:26	43,936
2	October 8	Atlanta Braves – 5, San Francisco Giants – 4 (11)	AT&T Park	3:47	44,046
3	October 10	San Francisco Giants – 3, Atlanta Braves – 2	Turner Field	3:23	53,284
4	October 11	San Francisco Giants – 3, Atlanta Braves – 2	Turner Field	2:56	44,532

== Philadelphia vs. Cincinnati ==
=== Game 1 ===
October 6, 2010 5:00 pm (EDT) at Citizens Bank Park in Philadelphia, Pennsylvania 61 °F (16 °C), overcast w/ passing shower
Team	1	2	3	4	5	6	7	8	9	R	H	E
Cincinnati	0	0	0	0	0	0	0	0	0	0	0	1
Philadelphia	1	3	0	0	0	0	0	0	X	4	5	0
WP: Roy Halladay (1–0) LP: Edinson Vólquez (0–1); Attendance: 46,411; Boxscore

In his first career postseason start, Phillies ace Roy Halladay hurled a no-hitter, giving up only one walk (to Jay Bruce in the fifth inning). Halladay's was only the second postseason no-hitter in Major League Baseball history, and the first since Don Larsen's perfect game in the 1956 World Series. He threw only 104 pitches.

During the 2010 regular season, Halladay had thrown a perfect game on the road against the Florida Marlins on May 29. He thus became the first and only pitcher to throw a no-hitter in the regular season and a no-hitter in the postseason in the same year. Halladay is also the fifth major league pitcher to throw two no-hitters in the same year, and the first since Nolan Ryan in 1973.

The Phillies' offense got started early when Shane Victorino sliced a double down the left field line in the first inning. After stealing third base, Chase Utley brought him home with a sacrifice fly. Victorino went 2-for-4 in the game and also had two RBIs on a single in the second inning that scored Wilson Valdez and Halladay. Halladay had reached earlier in the inning on an RBI single of his own, helping his own cause and becoming the first pitcher in major league history to outhit the opposing team in a postseason game.

Cincinnati starter Edinson Vólquez lasted only 1 2/3 innings before Travis Wood was called upon in relief by manager Dusty Baker. Volquez gave up four hits, four runs (all earned), and two walks. He faced 11 batters, retiring only five.

This would be the last postseason no–hitter until the Astros' combined no-hitter in the 2022 World Series, which also took place at Citizens Bank Park.

=== Game 2 ===
October 8, 2010 6:00 pm (EDT) at Citizens Bank Park in Philadelphia, Pennsylvania 71 °F (22 °C), clear
Team	1	2	3	4	5	6	7	8	9	R	H	E
Cincinnati	1	1	0	1	1	0	0	0	0	4	6	4
Philadelphia	0	0	0	0	2	1	3	1	X	7	8	2
WP: José Contreras (1–0) LP: Aroldis Chapman (0–1) Sv: Brad Lidge (1); Home runs: CIN: Brandon Phillips (1), Jay Bruce (1); PHI: None; Attendance: 46,511; Boxscore

On the fourth pitch he saw, Brandon Phillips hit a home run to lead off the first inning. This was both the first hit and first run since 1995 for the Reds in the postseason. Laynce Nix scored another run in the top of the second inning on two throwing errors and a wild pitch.

Jay Bruce hit a lead-off homer in the fourth inning to increase the lead to 3–0. In the top of the fifth inning, Phillips hit a lead-off double, advanced to third base on a sacrifice bunt, then scored on Joey Votto's sacrifice fly.

The Phillies mounted their attack in the bottom of the fifth inning. Pinch-hitter Domonic Brown reached first base on a fielder's choice, then the Phillies loaded the bases on two consecutive defensive errors. Chase Utley delivered a two-out RBI single to get the Phillies on board, but Arroyo struck out Ryan Howard to limit the damage at two.

The Phillies scored again in the sixth inning. Jayson Werth walked, stole second, then scored after two batters were hit by pitches and a bases-loaded walk by Reds relievers Arthur Rhodes and Logan Ondrusek.

The Reds sent flame-thrower Aroldis Chapman to the mound in the bottom of the seventh inning. He hit Chase Utley, the third time by Reds' relievers in the night, then struck out Ryan Howard. Werth hit a ground ball to Reds third baseman Scott Rolen, but Utley was called safe at second base. The next batter, Jimmy Rollins, hit a fly ball to right field, but Reds right fielder Jay Bruce lost it in the lights; Reds second baseman Phillips also missed the relay catch. These two crucial errors—the third and fourth on the night—let both Utley and Werth score. Rollins scored later on Raúl Ibañez's single and Carlos Ruiz's RBI force-out. Reds reliever Nick Masset replaced Chapman and got Shane Victorino to ground out to end the inning. The Phillies took a 6–4 lead on Reds' errors into the eighth inning.

In the bottom of the eighth inning, Utley hit a one-out single then stole second. Masset intentionally walked Howard to set up a potential double play for the next batter. However, Werth hit an RBI single to left field to score Utley.

Phillies closer Brad Lidge closed the ninth for the save.

The six combined errors tied an LDS record previously set by the Athletics and Red Sox in the 2003 ALDS.

=== Game 3 ===
October 10, 2010 7:00 pm (EDT) at Great American Ball Park in Cincinnati, Ohio 79 °F (26 °C), mostly clear
Team	1	2	3	4	5	6	7	8	9	R	H	E
Philadelphia	1	0	0	0	1	0	0	0	0	2	8	1
Cincinnati	0	0	0	0	0	0	0	0	0	0	5	2
WP: Cole Hamels (1–0) LP: Johnny Cueto (0–1); Home runs: PHI: Chase Utley (1); CIN: None; Attendance: 44,599; Boxscore

Cincinnati was again dominated by Phillies' starting pitching. Cole Hamels pitched a complete-game shutout, striking out nine while allowing five hits. Plácido Polanco scored for the Phillies on Orlando Cabrera's throwing error in the top of the first inning. Chase Utley added another run to the lead by hitting a home run in the fifth inning. With one out in the top of the ninth inning, Carlos Ruiz hit a double off Aroldis Chapman on a pitch that was clocked by PITCH f/x at 103.5 mph, making it the fastest pitched ball ever to result in a hit. For the series, Cincinnati was shut out two times and scored just four runs, making them among the very few teams to lose in a shutout twice (the 1966 Los Angeles Dodgers lost in three shutouts to the Baltimore Orioles in the World Series in a sweep). This was the Great American Ball Park's first playoff game.

This was the last playoff series won by the Phillies until 2022.

=== Composite line score ===
2010 NLDS (3–0): Philadelphia Phillies over Cincinnati Reds

Team	1	2	3	4	5	6	7	8	9	R	H	E
Philadelphia Phillies	2	3	0	0	3	1	3	1	0	13	21	3
Cincinnati Reds	1	1	0	1	1	0	0	0	0	4	11	7
Total attendance: 137,521 Average attendance: 45,840

== San Francisco vs. Atlanta ==
=== Game 1 ===
October 7, 2010 6:30 pm (PDT) at AT&T Park in San Francisco, California 65 °F (18 °C), clear
Team	1	2	3	4	5	6	7	8	9	R	H	E
Atlanta	0	0	0	0	0	0	0	0	0	0	2	2
San Francisco	0	0	0	1	0	0	0	0	X	1	5	0
WP: Tim Lincecum (1–0) LP: Derek Lowe (0–1); Attendance: 43,936; Boxscore

Game 1 was a pitching duel that matched the Giants' two-time Cy Young Award winner Tim Lincecum, in his first postseason start, against the Braves' Derek Lowe, a seasoned veteran of postseason play.

The game's only run came in the fourth inning. Giants rookie catcher Buster Posey singled to left, stole second in a controversial play where he was called safe while appearing to be out, and then scored on a two-out single by Cody Ross. That run was the only one Lincecum needed, as the Giants' ace was dominant, pitching a complete-game shutout, allowing only two hits and striking out a franchise record 14 while walking only one.

=== Game 2 ===
October 8, 2010 6:30 pm (PDT) at AT&T Park in San Francisco, California 64 °F (18 °C), partly cloudy
Team	1	2	3	4	5	6	7	8	9	10	11	R	H	E
Atlanta	0	0	0	0	0	1	0	3	0	0	1	5	11	0
San Francisco	3	1	0	0	0	0	0	0	0	0	0	4	10	2
WP: Kyle Farnsworth (1–0) LP: Ramón Ramírez (0–1); Home runs: ATL: Rick Ankiel (1); SF: Pat Burrell (1); Attendance: 44,046; Boxscore

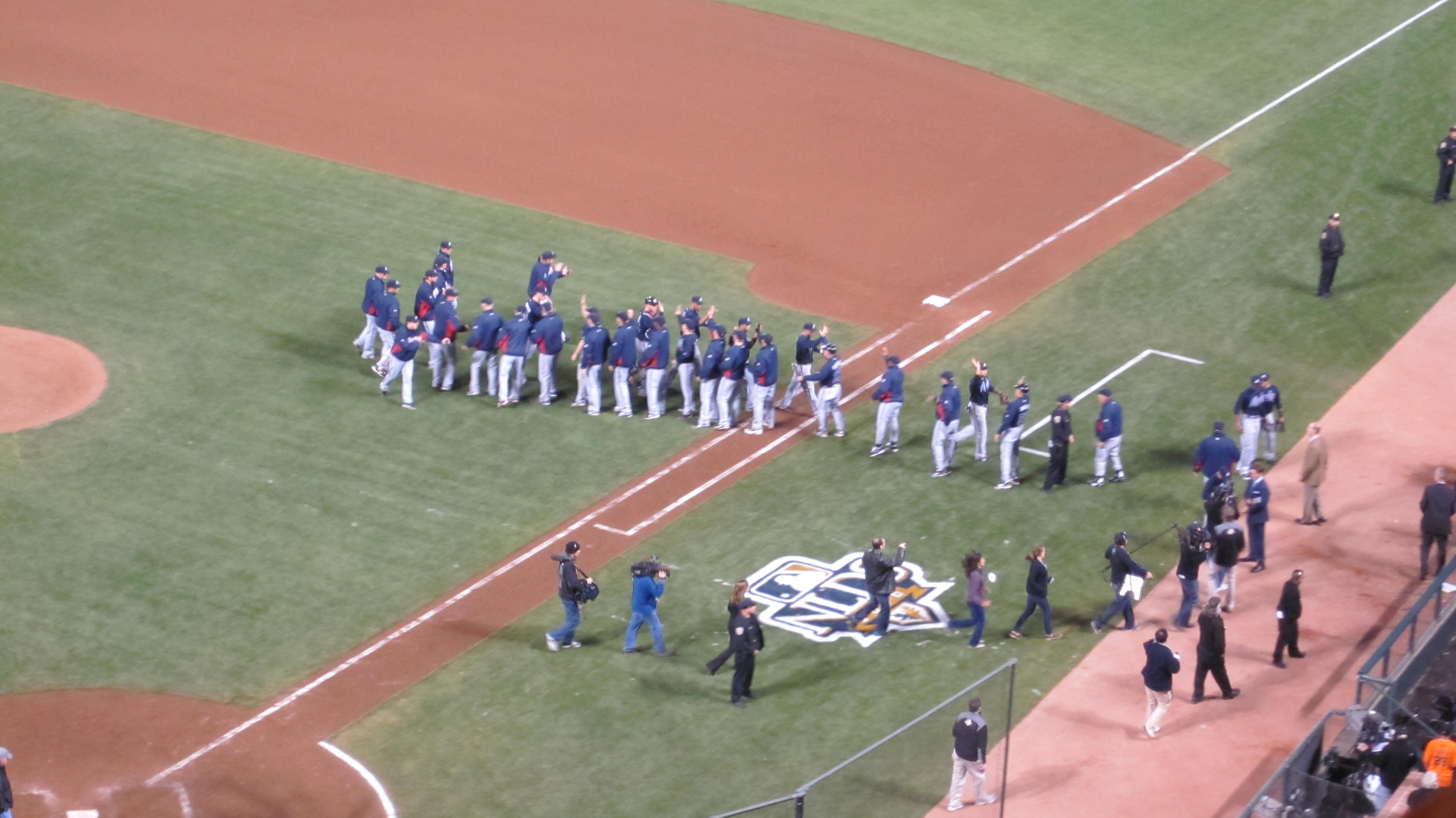
The Braves celebrate winning Game 2

The Giants took a quick 3–0 lead as Pat Burrell hit a three-run home run, following Freddy Sanchez's single and Buster Posey's walk in the bottom of the first inning.

Braves manager Bobby Cox was ejected from the game in the top of the second inning, arguing that Giants first baseman Aubrey Huff's foot did not stay on base on Álex González's groundout.

Giants starter Matt Cain also hit an RBI single in the bottom of the second inning, scoring Cody Ross, who had doubled earlier, increasing the Giants' lead to 4–0.

Braves first baseman Derrek Lee hit a lead-off single in the top of the sixth inning and advanced to second base on Pat Burrell's error. Brian McCann singled him home in the next at-bat to end the 14 scoreless innings streak for the Braves in this series.

The Braves struck back in the top of the eighth inning. After consecutive singles by Lee and McCann, the Giants brought in closer Brian Wilson for a six-out save. However, the next hitter, Melky Cabrera, hit an RBI ground ball that scored Lee from third base and Cabrera beat the throw to first base due to Giants' third baseman Pablo Sandoval's throwing error. Following Brooks Conrad's sacrifice bunt, Álex González's RBI double scored both runners and tied the game at 4–4.

The game remained tied and went to extra innings. In the bottom of the 10th inning, two consecutive bunts—one single, one sacrifice—knocked Braves closer Billy Wagner out of the game because of injury. Braves reliever Kyle Farnsworth hit the next batter, Freddy Sanchez, then walked Huff to load the bases with one out. However, Posey grounded into a double play to end the inning.

In the top of the 11th inning, Rick Ankiel hit a go-ahead home run into McCovey Cove on the fly to give the Braves a 5–4 lead. At the time, Ankiel was the only player in postseason history besides Barry Bonds to hit a home run into the Cove. Despite giving up a one-out single to Juan Uribe, Farnsworth retired Travis Ishikawa and Ross for the win and the series was tied at 1–1.

=== Game 3 ===
October 10, 2010 4:30 pm (EDT) at Turner Field in Atlanta, Georgia 84 °F (29 °C), clear
Team	1	2	3	4	5	6	7	8	9	R	H	E
San Francisco	0	1	0	0	0	0	0	0	2	3	8	0
Atlanta	0	0	0	0	0	0	0	2	0	2	4	3
WP: Sergio Romo (1–0) LP: Craig Kimbrel (0–1) Sv: Brian Wilson (1); Home runs: SF: None; ATL: Eric Hinske (1); Attendance: 53,284; Boxscore

Game 3 was yet another dramatic matchup of strong pitching. The Giants sent lefty Jonathan Sánchez to the mound, who turned in a strong performance, pitching a no-hitter through six innings. The Braves countered with right-hander Tim Hudson, who matched Sánchez for seven innings, allowing only one unearned run.

The Giants took an early lead in the second inning after leaving the bases loaded in the first. Third baseman Mike Fontenot started the inning by driving a triple off the right field wall. The next batter, Cody Ross, lofted a pop fly that was dropped by Atlanta second baseman Brooks Conrad, giving San Francisco a 1–0 lead. That run seemed to be all Sánchez would need, as he shut out the Braves for 7 1/3 innings.

With Álex González at first and one out in the bottom of the eighth inning, and the Giants still nursing their 1–0 lead, Giants setup man Sergio Romo, a right-hander, relieved Sánchez to face the right-handed Troy Glaus as a pinch-hitter. Braves manager Bobby Cox countered by sending left-handed batter Eric Hinske to the plate instead. With two strikes on him, Hinske turned on a hanging slider from Romo and drove it just inside the right field foul pole for a home run, giving the Braves a 2–1 lead, and electrifying the crowd at Turner Field.

Rookie right-hander Craig Kimbrel came out of the bullpen to start the top of the ninth for the Braves, relieving Jonny Venters, who had struck out the side the previous inning. Kimbrel retired Ross on a popout to Conrad, for the first out. Travis Ishikawa then pinch-hit for Romo and drew a walk. After striking out leadoff man Andrés Torres, Kimbrel gave up a single to second baseman Freddy Sanchez, and was removed from the game, leaving runners on first and second base, with two outs. Another rookie Brave, lefty Michael Dunn, came on and gave up a game-tying single to Aubrey Huff. Dunn was then pulled for a right-hander, Peter Moylan, who induced a grounder from Buster Posey, which proceeded to bounce through the legs of Conrad, the second baseman's third error of the game. Sanchez scored on the play, giving the Giants a 3–2 lead. Kyle Farnsworth came on and got the third out, but the damage was done. The Giants brought in their closer Brian Wilson for the bottom of the ninth. He held the lead, giving up a single to Brian McCann, but retiring Nate McLouth on a grounder to end the game.

=== Game 4 ===
October 11, 2010 7:30 pm (EDT) at Turner Field in Atlanta, Georgia 76 °F (24 °C), mostly clear
Team	1	2	3	4	5	6	7	8	9	R	H	E
San Francisco	0	0	0	0	0	1	2	0	0	3	5	1
Atlanta	0	0	1	0	0	1	0	0	0	2	7	2
WP: Madison Bumgarner (1–0) LP: Derek Lowe (0–2) Sv: Brian Wilson (2); Home runs: SF: Cody Ross (1); ATL: Brian McCann (1); Attendance: 44,532; Boxscore

With their backs against the wall, the Braves sent Derek Lowe to the mound on three days' rest. The Braves scored first in the bottom of the third inning when Brian McCann's sacrifice fly drove in Omar Infante.

Lowe took a no-hitter into the sixth inning, but the Giants tied the game with one out on Cody Ross' first-pitch homer off a cutter. McCann answered with another in the bottom of the inning off the Giants' rookie starter, Madison Bumgarner, to take back the lead.

Lowe was relieved after 6 1/3 innings. After walking Aubrey Huff and allowing an infield single to Buster Posey, Bobby Cox made his way out to the mound, apparently to remove Lowe from the game. However, after talking to him, Cox elected to leave Lowe in, prompting huge cheers from the Atlanta fans. The next batter, Pat Burrell, walked on a 3–1 pitch near the inside corner and Lowe's night was done. He struck out eight while allowing only two hits and walking two. Braves' relievers Peter Moylan and Jonny Venters could not hold the lead as the Giants scored two runs in the top of the seventh inning on Juan Uribe's RBI fielder's choice and Cody Ross' RBI single. The Braves might have been able to escape the one-out, bases-loaded jam, but Álex González's throwing error, his second in the game, cost them. Both errors were debatable. The first was a ball hit in the hole he didn't field cleanly with the speedy Andrés Torres running. The second was, again, another crucial controversial call that went against the Braves in the series. With two on and one out and a weakly hit groundball, González elected to go to second, throwing it high, causing Omar Infante to edge up, however, the umpire ruled he came off the base.

Left-handed Giants reliever Javier López entered the game with two outs in the eighth, and pinch-runner Nate McLouth as the tying run at second base, and struck out Jason Heyward. In the bottom of the ninth inning, the Braves had one last chance to rally. With one out, Giants closer Brian Wilson walked Rick Ankiel and Eric Hinske to put the winning run on base. However, Omar Infante struck out swinging and Melky Cabrera grounded out to end the game and the series.

This was Braves manager Bobby Cox's last game. After the game ended, he came out of the dugout briefly to acknowledge the fans. He was greeted with loud cheers from the entire stadium, as well as an ovation from the Giants' players and coaches.

=== Composite line score ===
2010 NLDS (3–1): San Francisco Giants over Atlanta Braves

Team	1	2	3	4	5	6	7	8	9	10	11	R	H	E
San Francisco Giants	3	2	0	1	0	1	2	0	2	0	0	11	28	3
Atlanta Braves	0	0	1	0	0	2	0	5	0	0	1	9	24	7
Total attendance: 185,798 Average attendance: 46,449

== See also ==
- 2010 American League Division Series
