= Juan Abreu =

Juan Abreu may refer to:

- Juan Abreu (outfielder) (1904–?), Cuban outfielder in the Negro leagues
- Juan Abreu (pitcher) (born 1985), Dominican former professional baseball pitcher
