= Juan Abreu (outfielder) =

Cuban baseball player (born 1904)

- Outfielder
- Born: 1904; Cienfuegos, Cuba

Negro league baseball debut
- 1930, for the Cuban Stars (East)

Last appearance
- 1937, for the Cuban Stars (East)

Teams
- Cuban Stars (East) (1930–1932, 1937)

Juan Abreu (1904 – death date unknown) was a Cuban outfielder in the Negro leagues in the 1930s.

A native of Cienfuegos, Cuba, Abreu played for the Cuban Stars (East) for several seasons between 1930 and 1937.
