= Tyler Pastornicky =

American baseball player (born 1989)

- Pastornicky with the Atlanta Braves in 2012
- Shortstop / Second baseman
- Born: December 13, 1989 (age 36); Bradenton, Florida, U.S.
- Batted: Right Threw: Right

MLB debut
- April 5, 2012, for the Atlanta Braves

Last MLB appearance
- July 25, 2014, for the Atlanta Braves

MLB statistics
- Batting average: .243
- Home runs: 2
- Runs batted in: 15
- Stats at Baseball Reference

Teams
- Atlanta Braves (2012–2014)
Medals
Men's baseball
Representing United States
Pan American Games
Silver medal – second place	2015 Toronto	Team
WBSC Premier12
Silver medal – second place	2015 Tokyo	Team

Tyler Brock Pastornicky (born December 13, 1989) is an American former professional baseball shortstop. He was drafted by the Toronto Blue Jays in 2008 Major League Baseball draft and made his Major League Baseball (MLB) debut with the Atlanta Braves in 2012.

== Professional career ==
=== Toronto Blue Jays ===
Pastornicky was drafted by the Toronto Blue Jays in the fifth round, with the 159th overall selection, of the 2008 Major League Baseball draft out of The Pendleton School. Pastornicky played 2008 with the rookie-level Gulf Coast League Blue Jays, hitting .263 in 50 games with one home run, 17 RBI, and 27 stolen bases in 32 attempts. He played 2009 mostly with the Single-A Lansing Lugnuts, hitting .269 in 109 games with one home run, 31 RBI, and 51 stolen bases in 66 attempts. Pastornicky played 15 games with High-A Dunedin Blue Jays. He started 2010 with Dunedin, hitting .258 with six home runs, 35 RBI, and 24 stolen bases in 31 attempts. Pastornicky was named to the Florida State League All-Star Game.

=== Atlanta Braves ===
On July 15, 2010, the Blue Jays traded Pastornicky along with Álex González and Tim Collins to the Atlanta Braves in exchange for Yunel Escobar and Jo-Jo Reyes. He finished 2010 with the Double-A Mississippi Braves. In total, Pastornicky hit .257 in 115 games with eight home runs, 50 RBI, and 35 stolen bases in 44 attempts. Following the season, he played for the Phoenix Desert Dogs, where he went 15-for-54 (.278) in 15 games. Pastornicky played 2011 mostly with Mississippi, but also played 27 games for the Triple-A Gwinnett Braves. With Mississippi, he hit .299 with six home runs and 36 RBI in 90 games and stole 20 of 28. He was named to the Southern League All-Star Game.

Pastornicky was called up to the majors for the first time on September 28, 2011. However, he did not appear for Atlanta before the conclusion of the season, and briefly became a phantom ballplayer.

Pastornicky made his major league debut on April 5, 2012, as the Opening Day shortstop for the Braves against the New York Mets in New York City. Pastornicky recorded his first hit that day, a triple off of Ramón Ramírez that went over the head of center fielder Andrés Torres. His first home run came on April 10, against the Houston Astros at Minute Maid Park. Pastornicky was sent back down to Triple-A Gwinnett after having the lowest fielding percentage among all major league shortstops. He was replaced by Andrelton Simmons who was called up from Double-A Mississippi on June 2. In 76 total appearances for the Braves during his rookie campaign, Pastornicky batted .243/.287/.325 with two home runs, 13 RBI, and two stolen bases.

Pastornicky played in 20 games for Atlanta during the 2013 season, going 9-for-30 (.300) with no home runs or RBI. He made 28 appearances for the Braves in 2014, slashing .200/.304/.250 with no home runs and two RBI.

Pastornicky was designated for assignment by the Braves on January 8, 2015, and later released by the organization on March 19.

=== Texas Rangers / Philadelphia Phillies ===
On March 22, 2015, Pastornicky signed a minor league contract with the Texas Rangers. He was assigned to AA Frisco RoughRiders. He was then promoted from AA to AAA Round Rock Express. The Rangers traded Pastornicky to the Philadelphia Phillies for cash considerations on August 10. He elected free agency in November 2015.

== International competition ==
Pastornicky represented the United States at the 2015 Pan American Games, and earned a silver medal as a member of the baseball team. In October, Pastornicky was placed on the roster for the inaugural 2015 WBSC Premier12. The United States finished the tournament with a silver medal.

== Personal life ==
He is the son of former Kansas City Royals third baseman Cliff Pastornicky and the grandson of Ernest Pastornicky, who played in the Chicago Cubs minor league system.

After ending his professional playing career, Pastornicky became a sports agent.

== See also ==
- List of second-generation Major League Baseball players
