= Tim Collins (baseball) =

American baseball player (born 1989)

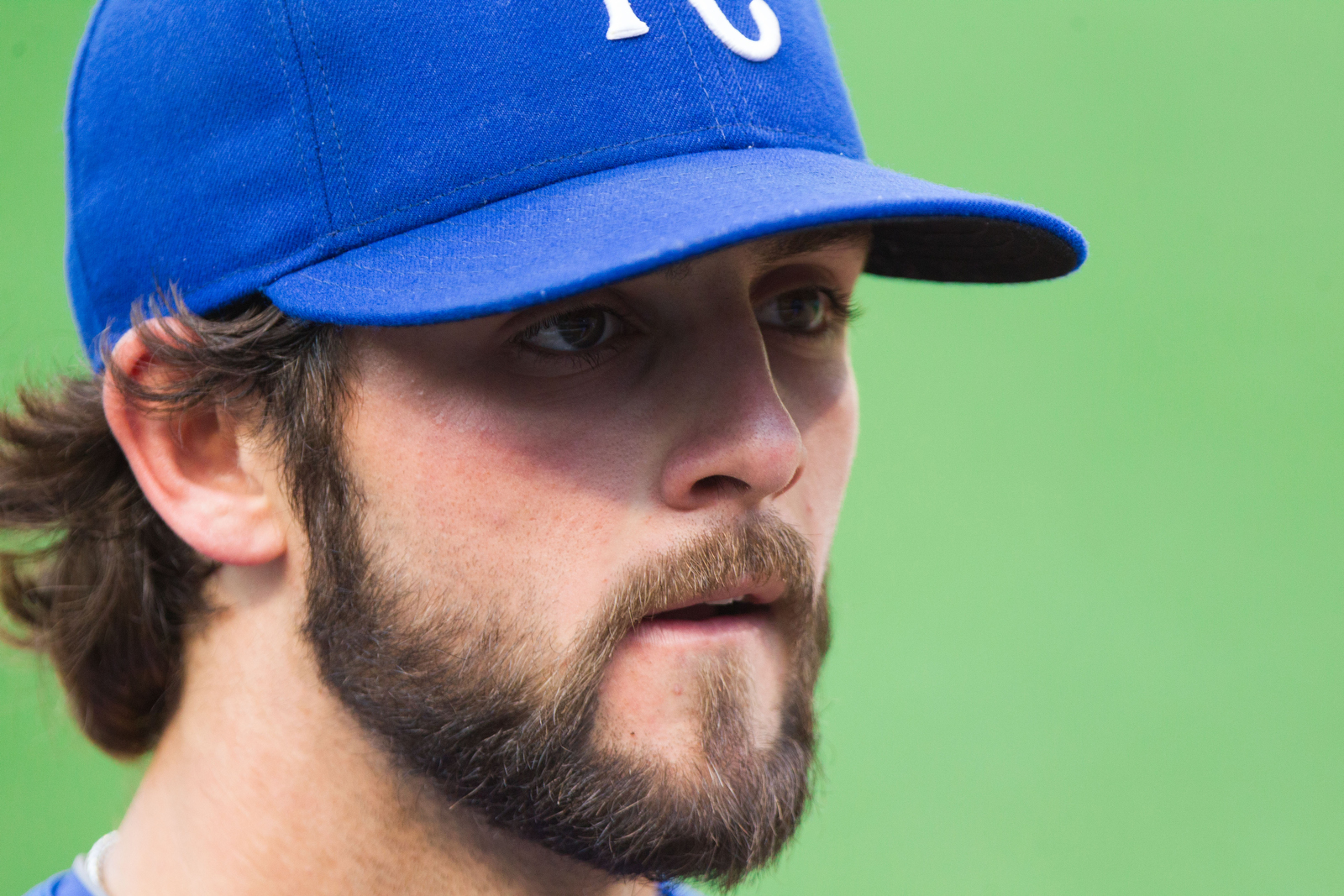
- Collins with the Kansas City Royals
- Pitcher
- Born: August 21, 1989 (age 36); Worcester, Massachusetts, U.S.
- Batted: Left Threw: Left

MLB debut
- March 31, 2011, for the Kansas City Royals

Last MLB appearance
- July 23, 2019, for the Chicago Cubs

MLB statistics
- Win–loss record: 12–17
- Earned run average: 3.60
- Strikeouts: 245
- Stats at Baseball Reference

Teams
- Kansas City Royals (2011–2014); Washington Nationals (2018); Chicago Cubs (2019)

Timothy Michael Collins (born August 21, 1989) is an American former professional baseball pitcher. He played in Major League Baseball (MLB) for the Kansas City Royals, Washington Nationals, and Chicago Cubs.

== Amateur career ==
Collins attended high school at Worcester Technical High School in Worcester, Massachusetts, which compiled a record of 91–5 during his four years there. Collins was overlooked by baseball scouts because of his size, standing at only 5'7". His senior year, Collins threw a no-hitter against Auburn High School in the district championship game.

== Professional career ==
=== Toronto Blue Jays ===
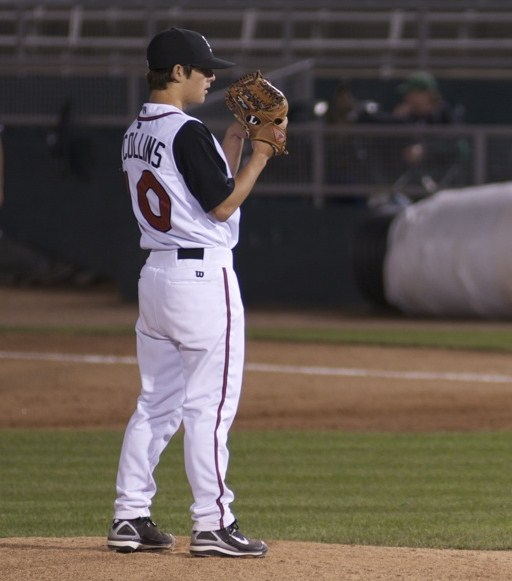
Collins pitching for the Lansing Lugnuts in 2008

Toronto Blue Jays' general manager J. P. Ricciardi discovered Collins after he was pitching in an American Legion Baseball game. After going undrafted, Collins signed with the Blue Jays out of high school as an undrafted free agent and began his professional career in 2007 with the Gulf Coast League Blue Jays of the Gulf Coast League Northern Division. In 7 games, Collins was involved in no decisions and had an ERA of 4.50. The next season, Collins was promoted to the Single–A Lansing Lugnuts of the Midwest League. That season, Collins went 4–2 with a 1.58 ERA, 98 strikeouts, and 14 saves in 49 games, all in relief. He was fifth in the league in ERA that season. His 14 saves ranked him third in the entire Blue Jays organization in that category. In 2009, Collins began the season with the High–A Dunedin Blue Jays of the Florida State League. In 40 games with Dunedin, he went 7–4 with a 2.37 ERA, 99 strikeouts, and 3 saves. He was named to the Florida State League All-Star team that season. Collins was later promoted to the Double-A New Hampshire Fisher Cats of the Eastern League. Collins compiled a record of 2–3 with a 5.68 ERA, and 17 strikeouts in 9 games with New Hampshire. On the season, Collins had a combined record of 9–7 with a 2.91 ERA in 77 1/3 innings pitched. Collins was rated as having the best curveball in the Blue Jays organization by Baseball America in 2010. Collins was selected as the Toronto Blue Jays organization's Postseason Player of the Year by MLB.com.

=== Atlanta Braves ===
On July 14, 2010, Collins was traded to the Atlanta Braves with Tyler Pastornicky and Alex González for shortstop, Yunel Escobar and pitcher, Jo-Jo Reyes.

=== Kansas City Royals ===
On July 31, 2010, Collins was traded along with Jesse Chavez and Gregor Blanco to the Kansas City Royals for Rick Ankiel and Kyle Farnsworth.

On March 31, 2011, Collins made his MLB debut against the Los Angeles Angels of Anaheim, pitching one inning. He did not allow a run and struck out Torii Hunter for his first MLB strikeout. Three days later, he earned his first MLB victory by pitching three scoreless innings against the Angels in extra innings, striking out five. On August 14, 2012, he set the Royals single season strikeout record for a left handed reliever. Collins finished the 2012 season with 93 strikeouts, second place among all Major League left-handed relievers behind the Reds Aroldis Chapman. Overall in 2012 Collins pitched 69 2/3 innings with an ERA of 3.36 and a record of 5–4. On March 11, 2015, Collins underwent Tommy John surgery and was ruled out for the entire 2015 season. An MRI taken in March 2016 showed that the ligament graft performed during the operation was not successful, and another Tommy John surgery had to be performed. On November 18, 2016, Collins elected free agency.

=== Washington Nationals ===
On December 13, 2016, Collins signed a minor league deal with the Washington Nationals. He split the 2017 season between the rookie–level Gulf Coast Nationals, High–A Potomac Nationals, and Double–A Harrisburg Senators. In 18 combined games between the three affiliates, Collins logged a 7.79 ERA with 23 strikeouts across 17 1/3 innings pitched. He elected free agency following the season on November 6, 2017.

On December 15, 2017, Collins re–signed with the Nationals on a new minor league contract. The Nationals purchased his contract on May 21, 2018. He made his Nationals debut and first major-league appearance since 2014 on May 21, 2018, entering a game against the San Diego Padres at Nationals Park in the eighth inning and getting two strikeouts, giving up one hit but no runs.

=== Chicago Cubs ===
On February 6, 2019, Collins signed a minor league deal with the Minnesota Twins that included an invitation to spring training. He was released prior to the start of the season on March 22.

On March 24, 2019, Collins signed a major league contract with the Chicago Cubs. Collins was designated for assignment by the Cubs on June 19, following the promotion of Adbert Alzolay. On July 23, the Cubs selected Collins' contract. Collins was designated again on July 26 following the acquisition of Derek Holland. He elected free agency on August 1.

=== Cincinnati Reds ===
On August 4, 2019, Collins signed a minor league contract with the Cincinnati Reds organization. In five appearances for the Triple–A Louisville Bats, he logged a 6.75 ERA with three strikeouts across four innings pitched. Collins elected free agency on November 4.

=== Colorado Rockies ===
On February 5, 2020, Collins signed a minor league deal with the Colorado Rockies. On July 27, Collins announced he was opting out of the season due to the COVID-19 pandemic. He became a free agent on November 2.

On January 12, 2026, it was reported that Collins would be attempting a comeback.

== Coaching career ==
On February 5, 2024, the Philadelphia Phillies hired Collins to serve as the pitching coach for their Single-A affiliate, the Clearwater Threshers. On February 7, 2025, Collins was named a pitching coach for Philadelphia's High-A affiliate, the Jersey Shore BlueClaws.

== Pitching style ==
Despite his small size, Collins garners good speed on his four-seam fastball (averaging 93–94 mph, tops out at 97 mph). He also features two effective off-speed pitches, a curveball at 74–77 mph and a changeup at 83–85 mph. The curve is his most common pitch when ahead in the count, and is a frequent offering with 2 strikes. His changeup is typically used earlier in the count and is mostly thrown to right-handed hitters. All three pitches have above-average whiff rates (including 51% for the changeup), leading to a high strikeout rate.
