= Yunel Escobar =

Cuban baseball player (born 1982)

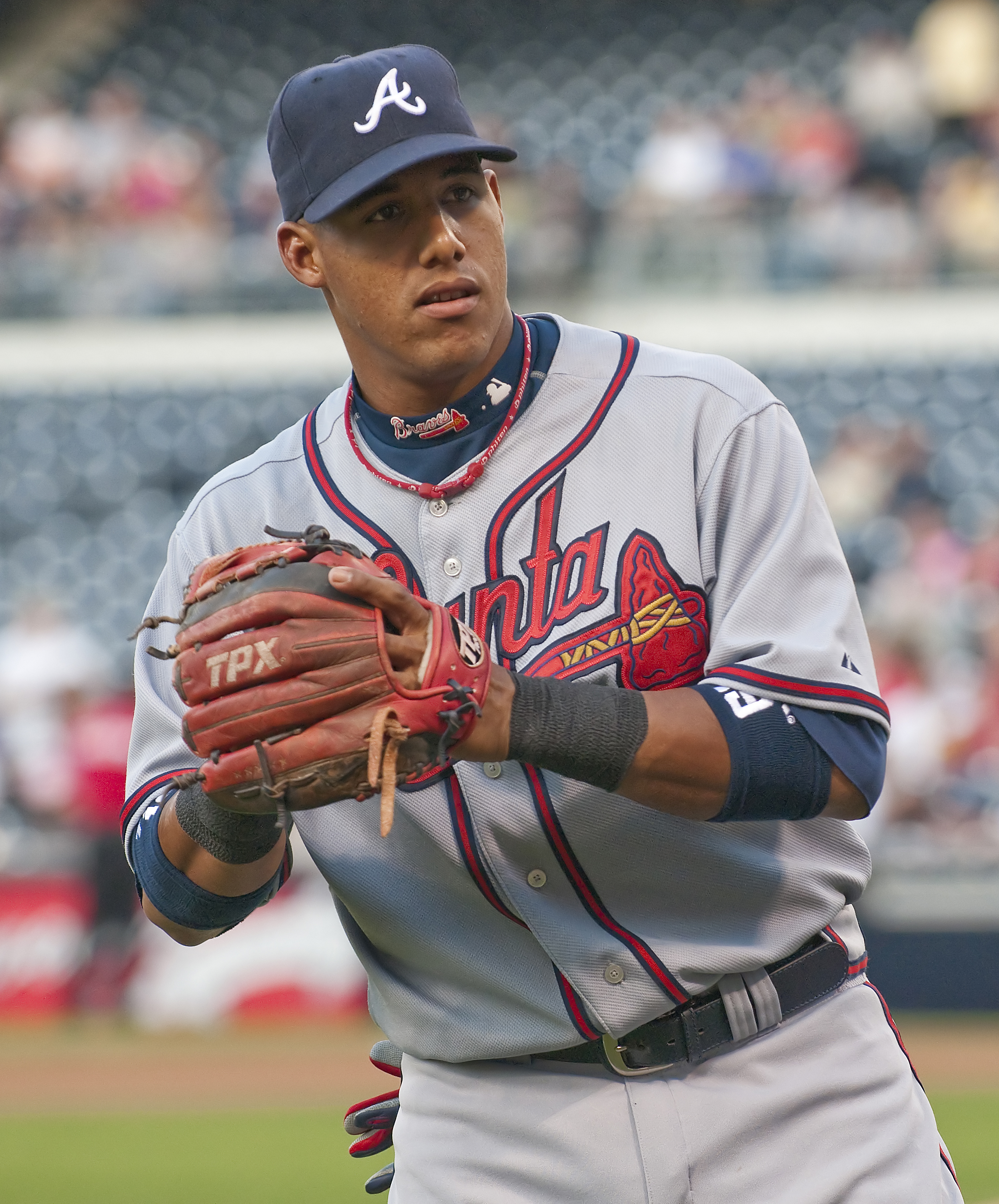
- Escobar with the Atlanta Braves in 2009
- Shortstop / Third baseman
- Born: November 2, 1982 (age 43); Havana, Cuba
- Batted: Right Threw: Right

MLB debut
- June 2, 2007, for the Atlanta Braves

Last MLB appearance
- August 6, 2017, for the Los Angeles Angels

MLB statistics
- Batting average: .282
- Home runs: 90
- Runs batted in: 519
- Stats at Baseball Reference

Teams
- Atlanta Braves (2007–2010); Toronto Blue Jays (2010–2012); Tampa Bay Rays (2013–2014); Washington Nationals (2015); Los Angeles Angels (2016–2017)

Yunel Escobar Almenares (born November 2, 1982) is a Cuban-born American former professional baseball shortstop and third baseman. He played in Major League Baseball (MLB) for the Atlanta Braves, Toronto Blue Jays, Tampa Bay Rays, Washington Nationals, and Los Angeles Angels. While he primarily played shortstop during his career, Escobar later transitioned to third base.

== Early life ==
Escobar was born on November 2, 1982, in Havana, Cuba. Brayan Peña, a former teammate of Escobar with the Atlanta Braves, was his good friend growing up in Cuba, with the two boys often playing on the same team and sharing bats, gloves, and cleats.

In 2004, Escobar defected from Cuba by sea, and landed in the Florida Keys.

== Career ==
=== Atlanta Braves ===
The Braves drafted Escobar in the second round of the 2005 draft, 75th overall. "We saw him as a premium talent", said Roy Clark, Atlanta's scouting director. "A lot of clubs didn't feel that they had enough background [on him]." Former Braves general manager John Schuerholz said he does not hesitate when he finds a Cuban who fits his team's needs. "I'm not a politician", Schuerholz said. "I'm a baseball general manager. We look for baseball talent wherever we can find it. And wherever it is, we go after it." Escobar's tense relationship with Cuban authorities in the aftermath of Peña's defection had limited his exposure to major league scouts. With little more than a few off-season workouts to draw upon, most teams were reluctant to take a chance on Escobar. The Braves, however, spoke with Peña, who had been called up to the majors to play for the Braves only days before Escobar was drafted in the 2005 draft. Braves officials asked Peña countless questions about everything from Escobar's skill set to his command of English to his family background. "The best recommendation we got was from Brayan", Clark says. Escobar received a $475,000 signing bonus.

After being drafted and signed by the Braves in 2005, Yunel began in the Appalachian League with Danville, hitting .400 with two homers.

Escobar played the entire 2006 season in Double-A Mississippi and was selected to All-Star Futures Game. His performance in Mississippi was somewhat disappointing with a few bright spots. Escobar showed good plate discipline with 59 walks against just 77 strikeouts. This led to a strong .361 on-base percentage. However, Escobar saw his power numbers drop. His slugging percentage fell to .346 (it was .470 in 2005) and his OPS went from .828 to .707. Throughout these struggles, Escobar developed a contentious relationship with manager, Jeff Blauser. His talent reasserted itself with a strong performance in the Arizona Fall League.

Escobar had a very strong spring training for the Braves in 2007 before being sent down to Triple-A Richmond to start the season. Escobar set the Triple-A International League on fire during his short stint there during the first two months of the 2007 season. In 46 games, Escobar hit .333 with a .379 OBP and a .456 SLG. Escobar made his major league debut on June 2, 2007, against the Chicago Cubs at third base.

He hit a single in his first Major League at-bat, and finished the game 2-for-4 with a double, an RBI, and a run. His double in the top of the 8th inning gave the Braves the lead in their 5–3 win. "This is what I dreamed about when I first left Cuba and got to the United States", said Escobar, with Braves bench coach Chino Cadahia serving as an interpreter. "It was especially great because it was in a city like Chicago and there were so many people here. Having the game-winning RBI, playing good defense and having the team win, I couldn't have dreamed it any better." "I had plenty of confidence in myself that I could get the job done", said Escobar. "It's fun to see any young kid come up", Braves manager Bobby Cox said. "[Escobar] battles. He's a no-fear type of player and hitter." "I've always had a lot of confidence in myself", Escobar said. "It's just the game of baseball."

Escobar's first Major League home run came on June 4, 2007, against Florida Marlins pitcher Wes Obermueller. In the fourth inning of a 2–2 game – his first at Turner Field – Escobar took a high fastball from Obermueller the "opposite way", hitting it over the wall in right field. He finished the day 4-for-4 with two singles and a double in addition to his home run.

On July 27, 2007, in a game against the Arizona Diamondbacks, Escobar exhibited an uncanny sense of alertness (and riskiness) as the Braves were down 7–6 in the bottom of the ninth inning. With two outs, Escobar drew a walk from Arizona closer José Valverde. Seeing Valverde bending down to fix his sock with his back turned toward second base with no position player near the bag, Escobar sprinted immediately for second base. By the time Valverde realized what Escobar was attempting to do, it was too late to throw him out. He scored from second on the next play as Willie Harris hit a two-out single, tying the game at 7–7 and completing a seven-run comeback for Atlanta. The Braves, however, went on to lose in extra innings. "You'd be shocked how many times players could do that, that don't", said Cox, who says he was successful with this daring attempt during his Major League days with the Yankees. "It's something you see a lot in the Minors and not as much up here, because guys have had it happen to them in the Minors", Rentería said. "That's why when a guy gets to first base, I'm always paying attention."

On August 5, 2007, Escobar recorded his first career walk-off hit against the Colorado Rockies in the 10th inning when he singled in Jeff Francoeur to give the Braves a 6–5 win. On August 29, Escobar belted his first leadoff homer in a 7–4 win over the Marlins. Escobar finished his rookie season with a .326 batting average.

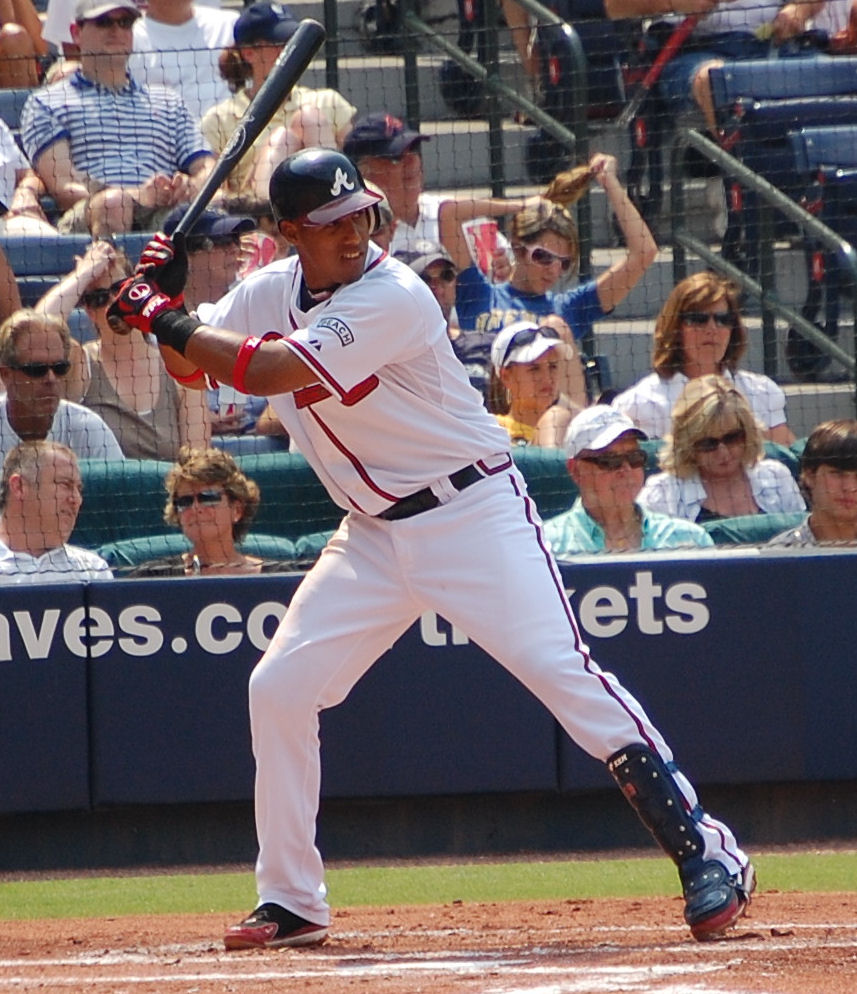
Escobar batting for the Atlanta Braves in 2008

Escobar (1 point) came in a tie for sixth, as Ryan Braun (128 points) won the vote for the 2007 NL Sporting News Rookie of the Year Award by 488 major league players and 30 managers.

Due in part to Escobar's emergence, the Braves traded starting shortstop Édgar Rentería to the Detroit Tigers following the 2007 season for Jair Jurrjens and Gorkys Hernández. "Rentería taught him a lot", said Brayan Peña. "Rentería is like a father to him. They worked out all the time together. Escobar says that a lot of what he knows, he owes to Rentería."

On June 2, 2008, exactly one year after his major league debut, Escobar recorded his first career walk-off home run in a 7–5 victory over the Florida Marlins.

Escobar started the 2008 season hitting .315 with a .386 OBP, .435 SLG and .821 OPS over 192 plate appearances. Beginning in May 2008, Escobar began to slump. Over the next 54 games, he hit .246 with a .315 OBP and a .321 SLG and .636 OPS over 250 plate appearances. Escobar rebounded over his final 38 games of the season, hitting .328 with a .427 OBP, .500 SLG and .927 OPS over 145 plate appearances. He ended the season with final averages of .288 AVG with a .366 OBP and a .401 SLG.

Escobar had by all accounts a very good year with the glove in 2008. Defensively, he was rated 12 runs above average according to John Dewan's +/- Fielding Bible, 10 runs above average according to Tom Tango's Fan Scouting Report, and 3 runs above average according to Mitchel Lichtman's Ultimate Zone Rating.

2009 was Escobar's best year statistically, and was also strong in the field. After several mental-lapses mid season (and some time spent on the bench), he recovered, committing just two errors in his last 75 games and hitting .299 with a career-high 14 home runs.

=== Toronto Blue Jays ===
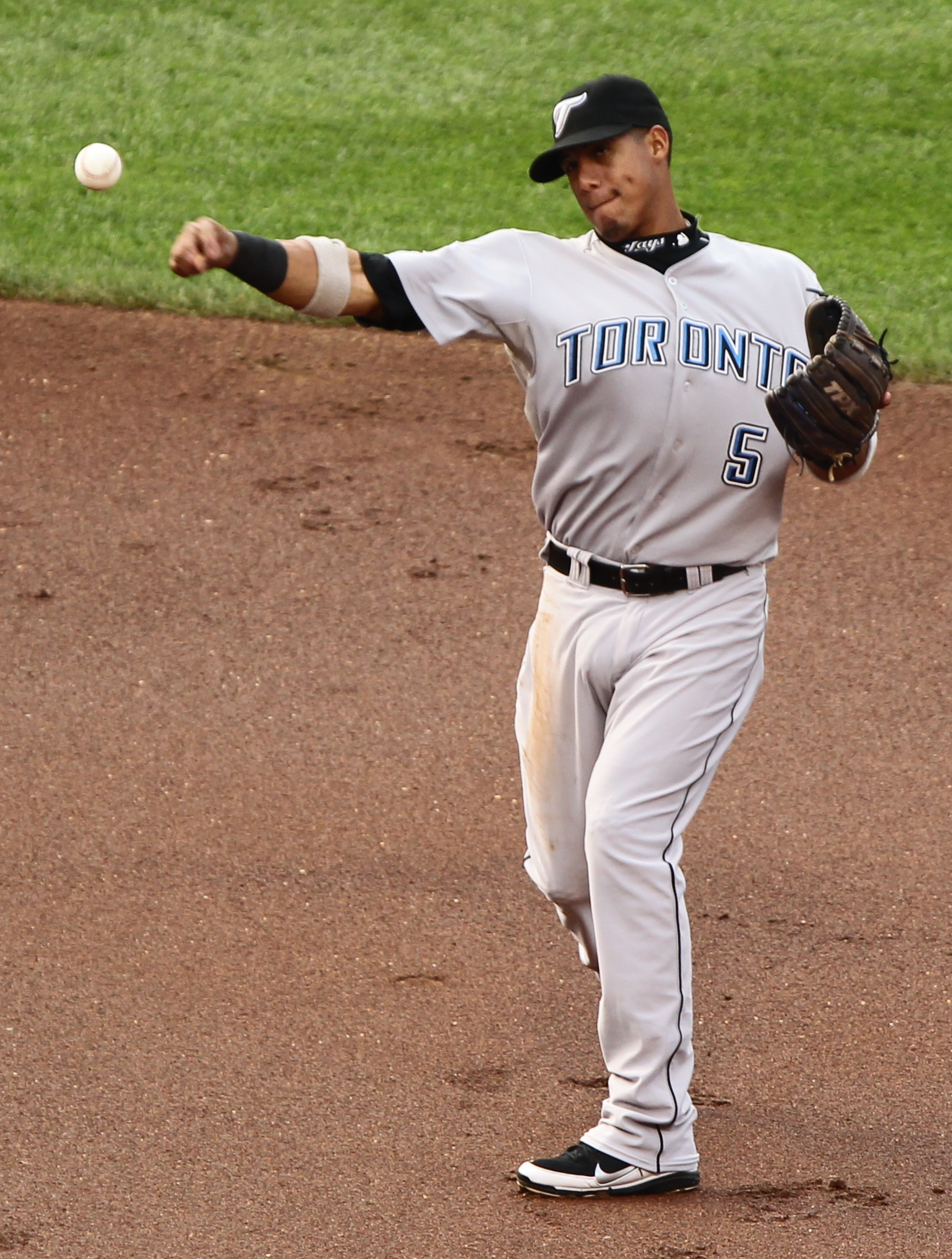
Escobar fielding for the Toronto Blue Jays in 2011

On July 14, 2010, Escobar was traded by the Braves to the Toronto Blue Jays with Jo-Jo Reyes for shortstop Alex González and two minor league prospects: left-handed pitcher Tim Collins and shortstop Tyler Pastornicky. Days later Escobar would hit the Jays' first Grand Slam of the season in Baltimore in just his third game with the team. Escobar hit his second home run for the Blue Jays in his fourth game with the club, against Kansas City on July 19, 2010.

On September 6, 2010, after returning from an injury, Escobar hit his fourth home run of the season in a 7–2 win over the Texas Rangers, after having played 75 games without a home run with the Braves.

Escobar was an opening day starter at shortstop on April 1 for the Jays. On April 5, Escobar hit a 2-run walk-off home run against the Oakland Athletics, his second career walk-off home run. On April 6, 2011, Escobar left the game after sliding head first into third. He hit his head on third baseman Andy LaRoche's knee. On May 23, 2011, Escobar batted in the clean-up position (4th) for the first time in his career. He went 1-for-3.

On June 19, 2011, the Blue Jays announced that Escobar had been signed to a two-year contract extension worth $10 million. The deal also included club options for 2014 and 2015, each worth $5 million.

In a game against the New York Yankees on August 29, 2012, Escobar tied career highs in hits (with 4) and RBI (with 5) in an 8–5 win.

=== Tampa Bay Rays ===
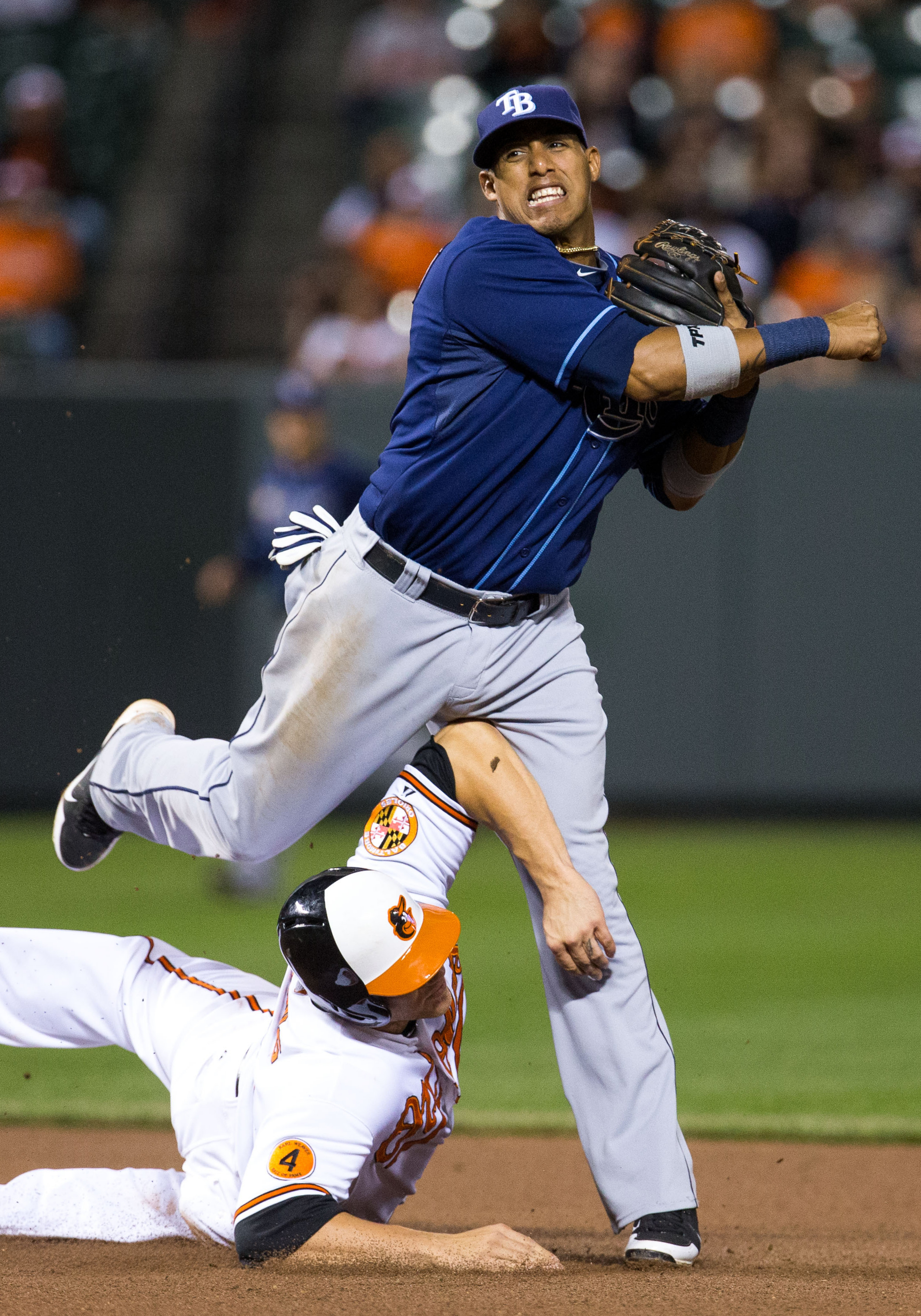
Escobar playing for the Tampa Bay Rays in 2013

On November 19, 2012, Escobar was traded to the Miami Marlins along with Adeiny Hechavarria, Henderson Álvarez, Jeff Mathis, Jake Marisnick, Anthony DeSclafani, and Justin Nicolino, in exchange for Mark Buehrle, Josh Johnson, José Reyes, John Buck, and Emilio Bonifacio. The Marlins then traded him to the Tampa Bay Rays on December 4, 2012, for Derek Dietrich. On September 26, 2013, Escobar became the last batter to ever face Mariano Rivera, popping out to second baseman Robinson Cano. On April 5, 2014, Escobar signed a two-year extension worth $13 million with the Rays.

=== Washington Nationals ===
On January 10, 2015, Escobar was traded to the Oakland Athletics with teammate Ben Zobrist in exchange for John Jaso, Daniel Robertson, and Boog Powell. A few days later, on January 14, 2015, Oakland traded him to the Washington Nationals for Tyler Clippard.

On April 21, 2015, Escobar hit a walk-off home run against the St. Louis Cardinals in the 10th inning giving the Nationals a 2–1 win.

=== Los Angeles Angels ===
On December 10, 2015, Escobar was traded to the Los Angeles Angels in exchange for Trevor Gott and Michael Brady. In 2016, he batted .304, and on defense he led the major leagues in throwing errors, with 14. He became a free agent following the 2017 season.

== Eye black incident ==
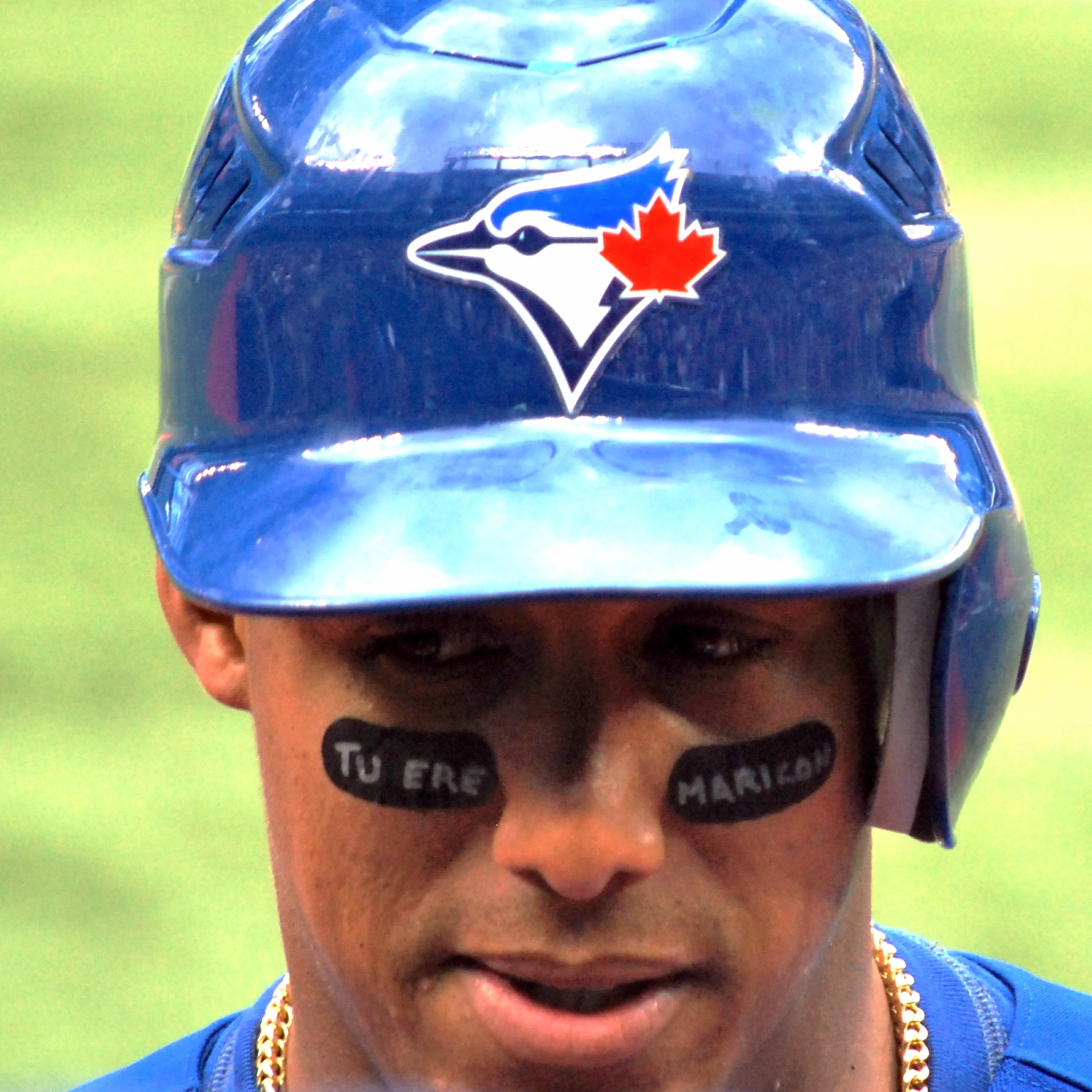
Escobar's anti-gay slur eye black

During a game against the Boston Red Sox on September 15, 2012, Escobar was photographed with the phrase "tu ere maricon" (the Spanish equivalent of "you are a faggot") written in his eye black. Escobar apologized and stated that he did not intend his usage of the slur to be "misinterpreted" by the LGBT community, saying it is part of everyday repartee among Latino players and not seen as offensive. Other Latino players defended Escobar as a good person who did not intend offense.

Due to the incident, Escobar was suspended by the Blue Jays for three games and the $82,000 in salary he would have earned in those games was donated to the LGBT advocacy groups You Can Play and the Gay & Lesbian Alliance Against Defamation. He also underwent sensitivity training.

== Personal life ==
Escobar became an American citizen on March 10, 2017, in Miami, Florida.

== See also ==
- List of baseball players who defected from Cuba
