= Álex González (shortstop, born 1977) =

Venezuelan baseball player

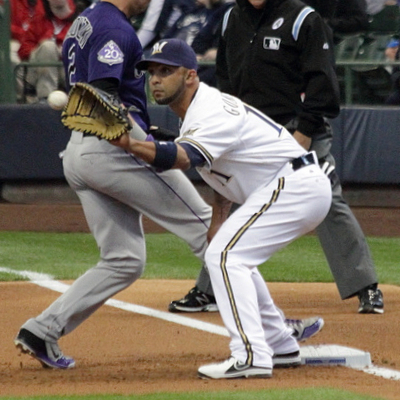
- González with the Milwaukee Brewers
- Shortstop
- Born: February 15, 1977 (age 49); Cagua, Aragua, Venezuela
- Batted: Right Threw: Right

MLB debut
- August 25, 1998, for the Florida Marlins

Last MLB appearance
- April 17, 2014, for the Detroit Tigers

MLB statistics
- Batting average: .245
- Home runs: 157
- Runs batted in: 690
- Stats at Baseball Reference

Teams
- Florida Marlins (1998–2005); Boston Red Sox (2006); Cincinnati Reds (2007, 2009); Boston Red Sox (2009); Toronto Blue Jays (2010); Atlanta Braves (2010–2011); Milwaukee Brewers (2012–2013); Detroit Tigers (2014)

Career highlights and awards
- All-Star (1999); World Series champion (2003)

Álexander Luis González (born February 15, 1977) is a Venezuelan former professional baseball shortstop. González played in Major League Baseball (MLB) for the Florida Marlins (1998–2005), Boston Red Sox (2006, 2009), Cincinnati Reds (2007–2009), Toronto Blue Jays (2010), Atlanta Braves (2010–2011), Milwaukee Brewers (2012–2013) and Detroit Tigers (2014). He was given the nickname "Sea-bass" while playing in Florida. He bats and throws right-handed.

== Playing career ==
=== Florida Marlins ===
In 1999, while with the Florida Marlins, González made the Major League Baseball All-Star Game.

In 2001, he led all Major League shortstops with 26 errors.

González played an important role in the 2003 World Series against the Yankees. After going 1-for-13 in the first three games of the World Series, he hit a walk-off home run in the 12th inning of Game 4 to give the Marlins a 4–3 victory and a 2–2 tie in the Series. The extra innings happened because Florida's closer Ugueth Urbina blew a 3–1 lead in the ninth. In Game 5, González hit a two-out game-tying double and later scored, helping the Marlins take a 3–2 series lead. González added an extra run in the sixth and final game, when he slid around catcher Jorge Posada, eluding him and brushing the plate with his left hand. Florida beat the odds with a 2–0 victory and won the World Series.

One of his most productive seasons came in 2004, when he posted career highs in at bats (561) and games played (159), tied a career high in home runs (23), yet also had a career high in strikeouts (126).

=== Boston Red Sox (first stint) ===
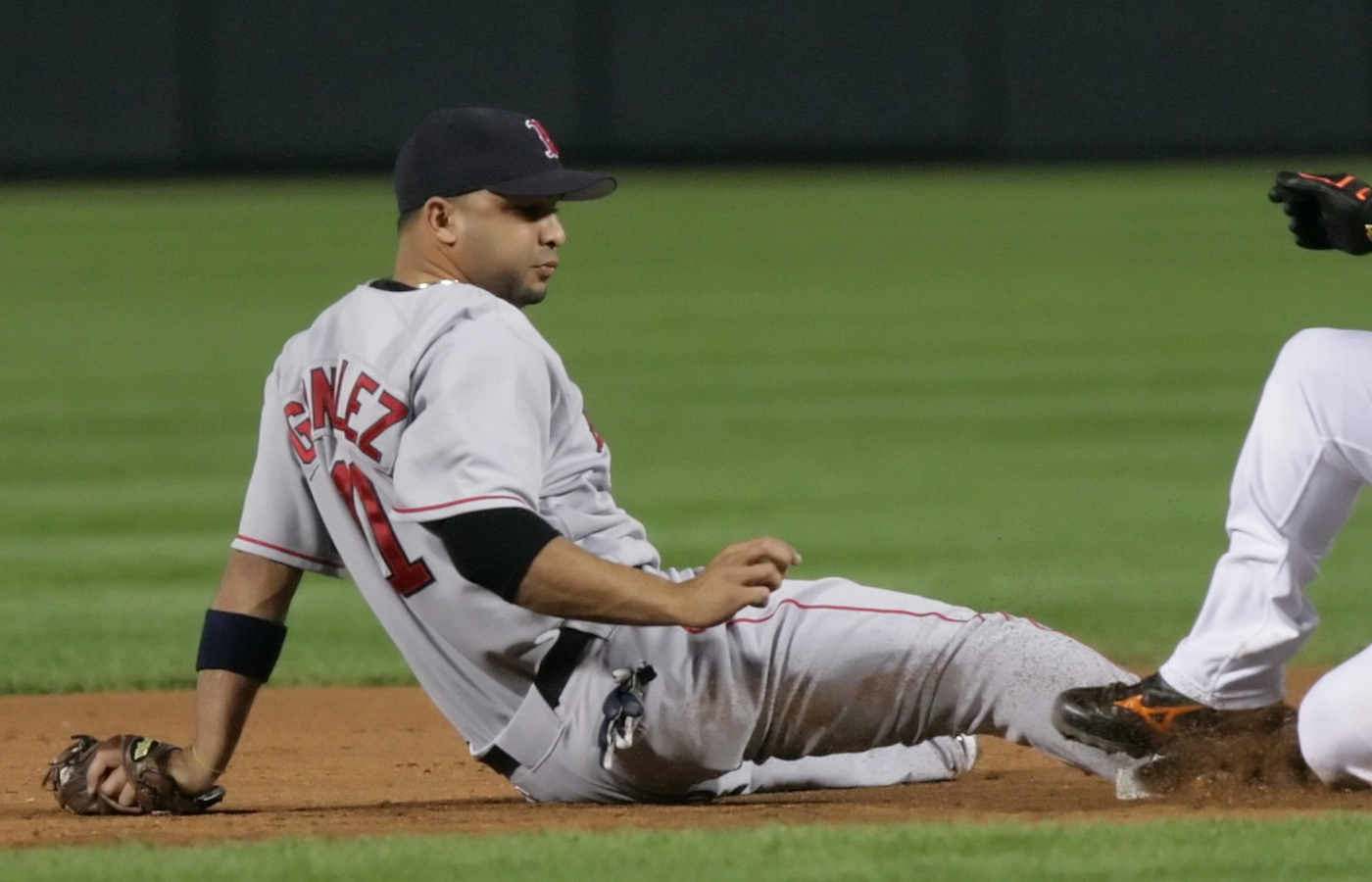
González during his tenure with the Boston Red Sox in 2006

Before the 2006 season, the Boston Red Sox signed González as a free agent to a one-year contract worth $3 million, plugging a hole in the starting lineup after the trade of shortstop Édgar Rentería to the Atlanta Braves. He reunited with former Marlins' teammates Josh Beckett and Mike Lowell who were traded from Florida to Boston earlier.

González's signing with the Sox marked the second time he had replaced Rentería as the shortstop; Renteria had just left the Marlins for the St. Louis Cardinals before González joined the team in 1998.

=== Cincinnati Reds ===
On November 18, 2006, he signed a three-year, $14 million contract with the Cincinnati Reds. In 2008, an MRI showed that Gonzalez still had a fracture in his left knee.

He was named Player of the Week for the week of April 29, 2007.

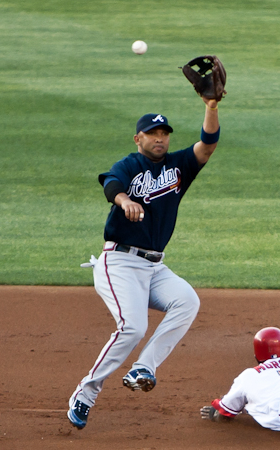
González playing for the Braves in 2010

When González was hurt in February, it looked like he'd be back in the middle of April. Gonzalez had surgery on the knee in July, however, and ultimately missed the entire 2008 season.

=== Boston Red Sox (second stint) ===
On August 14, 2009, González cleared waivers with the Cincinnati Reds and was traded back to the Boston Red Sox with $1.1 million for Single A shortstop Kristopher Negron. From August 15 through the end of the regular season, González appeared in 44 games for Boston, batting .284 with 5 home runs and 15 RBIs.

=== Toronto Blue Jays ===
On November 26, 2009, González signed a one-year deal with the Toronto Blue Jays, with a club option for a second year.

=== Atlanta Braves ===
On July 14, 2010, González was traded along with prospects Tim Collins and Tyler Pastornicky to the Atlanta Braves for shortstop Yunel Escobar and Jo-Jo Reyes.

=== Milwaukee Brewers ===
On December 8, 2011, González was signed in free agency by the Milwaukee Brewers. He signed a one-year deal with a vesting option for 2013 if he has at least 525 plate appearances in 2012. He will make $4.25 million in 2012, and would make $4 million in 2013. On May 5, 2012, Gonzalez was placed on the 15-day disabled list after suffering a right knee injury earlier in the day in a game at the San Francisco Giants. He was then placed on the disabled list after revealing that he had a torn ACL, and remained there for the rest of the season. During the offseason Gonzalez played in the Venezuelan Winter League for the Leones del Caracas. González filed for free agency after the World Series, but ultimately re-signed with the Brewers on a one-year, $1.5 million deal. He was released on June 3, 2013.

=== Baltimore Orioles ===
On January 31, 2014, González signed a minor league contract with the Baltimore Orioles. He never appeared in a game with the Orioles.

=== Detroit Tigers ===
On March 24, 2014, González was traded to the Detroit Tigers in exchange for Steve Lombardozzi Jr., who never played in Tigers uniform. In his Tigers debut Opening Day against the Kansas City Royals, Gonzalez hit an RBI-triple to tie the game in the seventh inning, and later hit a walk-off single in the ninth to give the Tigers a 4–3 victory. He was released on April 20, 2014.

== See also ==
- List of Major League Baseball players from Venezuela
