= Brooks Conrad =

American baseball player and coach (born 1980)

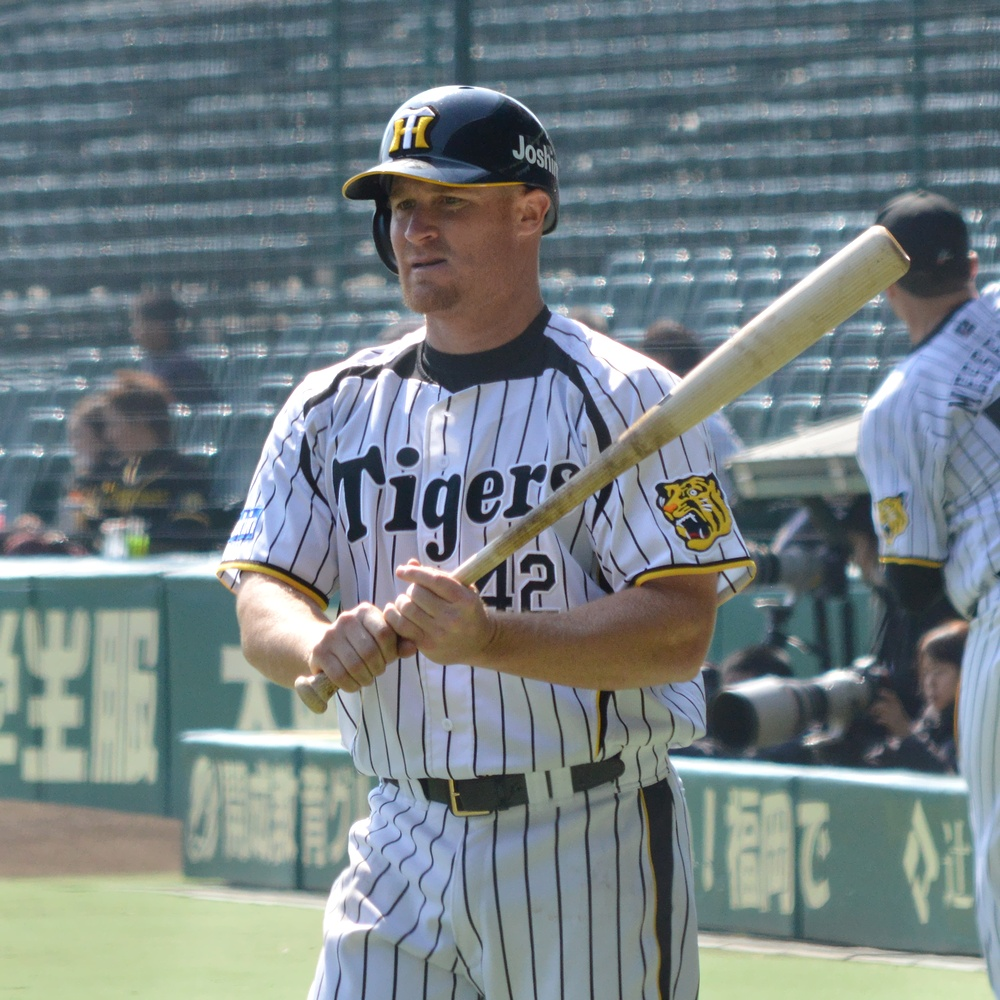
- Conrad with the Hanshin Tigers in 2013
- Infielder / Manager
- Born: January 16, 1980 (age 46); San Diego, California, U.S.
- Batted: Switch Threw: Right

Professional debut
- MLB: July 21, 2008, for the Oakland Athletics
- NPB: March 29, 2013, for the Hanshin Tigers

Last appearance
- NPB: May 28, 2013, for the Hanshin Tigers
- MLB: July 27, 2014, for the San Diego Padres

MLB statistics
- Batting average: .200
- Home runs: 19
- Runs batted in: 73

NPB statistics
- Batting average: .175
- Home runs: 0
- Runs batted in: 0
- Stats at Baseball Reference

Teams
- Oakland Athletics (2008); Atlanta Braves (2009–2011); Milwaukee Brewers (2012); Tampa Bay Rays (2012); Hanshin Tigers (2013); San Diego Padres (2014)

Brooks Litchfield Conrad (born January 16, 1980) is an American former professional baseball second baseman and third baseman. He played in Major League Baseball (MLB) from 2008 to 2014 for the Oakland Athletics, Atlanta Braves, Milwaukee Brewers, and Tampa Bay Rays, and San Diego Padres. Conrad also played in Nippon Professional Baseball (NPB) for the Hanshin Tigers in 2013. Conrad has coached in the minor leagues for the Kansas City Royals organization following the conclusion of his playing career.

== Playing career ==
=== Amateur career ===
Conrad is a graduate of Monte Vista High School in California. He was a member of the Arizona State Sun Devils baseball team from 1999 to 2001.

=== Houston Astros ===
Conrad was drafted by the Houston Astros in the eighth round (236th pick) of the 2001 Draft. He played with the Astros' Triple-A affiliate, the Round Rock Express. Conrad played in the Houston Astros organization from 2001 to 2007 before becoming a minor league free agent after the 2007 season.

=== Oakland Athletics ===
Conrad signed with the Oakland Athletics organization prior to the 2008 season. He was called up to play with the A's against the Tampa Bay Rays on July 21, 2008. On August 12, Conrad was designated for assignment.

=== Atlanta Braves ===
Conrad became a free agent at the end of the season and signed a minor league contract with an invitation to spring training with the Atlanta Braves in November 2008.

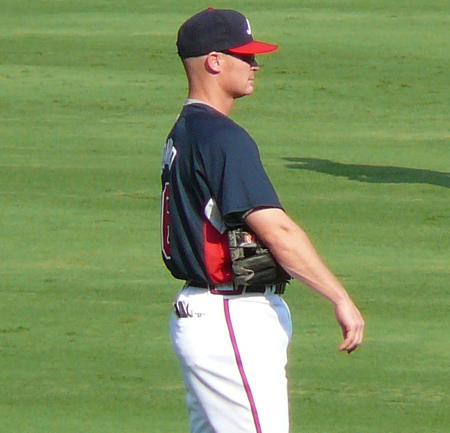
Conrad with the Atlanta Braves in 2009

On July 3, 2009, Conrad hit his first major league home run - a 3-run shot as a pinch-hitter in the Braves 9–8 win over the Washington Nationals after being called up from the Triple-A Gwinnett Braves. On July 7, Conrad hit his first career Major League triple off Chicago Cubs pitcher Carlos Zambrano. On September 1, Conrad was called back up to the Braves.

In 2010, Conrad frequently picked up clutch hits at the end of games, but committed defensive miscues at the end of the season and postseason. On May 20, 2010, Conrad came to the plate with one out, the bases loaded in the bottom of the 9th, with the Braves trailing 9–6. He hit a walk-off grand slam against Cincinnati Reds pitcher, Francisco Cordero, to cap an eight-run comeback for his team. On June 12, Conrad dropped down an eventual game winning suicide squeeze bunt to score Gregor Blanco in the 9th inning against the Minnesota Twins. On July 24, Conrad hit his second go-ahead grand slam of the year, in the 8th inning against Burke Badenhop of the Florida Marlins. The Braves went on to win, 10–5. On August 10, with a runner on first and no outs in the top of the 9th, Conrad hit a two-run homer to put the Braves ahead of the Houston Astros, 3–2, in a game that the Braves would go on to win. Nicholas James Baker caught the home run ball over the rail of the second deck in his hat. On August 13, Conrad hit his final game-winning home run of the season. This one came in the bottom of the 7th, against Hiroki Kuroda of the Los Angeles Dodgers.

In game three of the 2010 NLDS, Conrad made three errors in a loss to the San Francisco Giants, who would eventually go on to win the World Series. His second error, in the second inning, let in a Giants' run. His third error was far more important. After Eric Hinske hit a two-run, eighth inning pinch-hit home run to put the Braves ahead by one run, Conrad let a ball go between his legs in the top of the ninth. This error allowed the game-winning run to score. The Giants took a 2–1 series-lead. Conrad's three errors tied a Division Series record. Conrad was replaced by veteran third baseman Troy Glaus in game four, but did not appear as a pinch-hitter in the game, a series-clinching win for the Giants. The infielder committed eight errors in his final seven games of the year. The Giants went on to win the World Series.

On May 1, 2011, in a game against the St. Louis Cardinals, Conrad came off the bench to hit a game-winning single in the bottom of the 9th inning to give the Braves a 6–5 victory. Later in the month on May 25 in a game against the Pittsburgh Pirates, Conrad launched a go-ahead and ultimately game-winning 2-run homer in the 11th inning. He made 92 total appearances for the Braves during the 2011 campaign, slashing .223/.325/.388 with four home runs, 13 RBI, and two stolen bases. On December 13, Conrad was non-tendered by the Braves, and became a free agent.

=== Milwaukee Brewers ===
On January 7, 2012, Conrad signed a minor league deal with the Milwaukee Brewers. His deal included an invitation to Spring Training. Conrad competed for a roster spot with Taylor Green and Zelous Wheeler in spring training in 2012.

=== Tampa Bay Rays ===
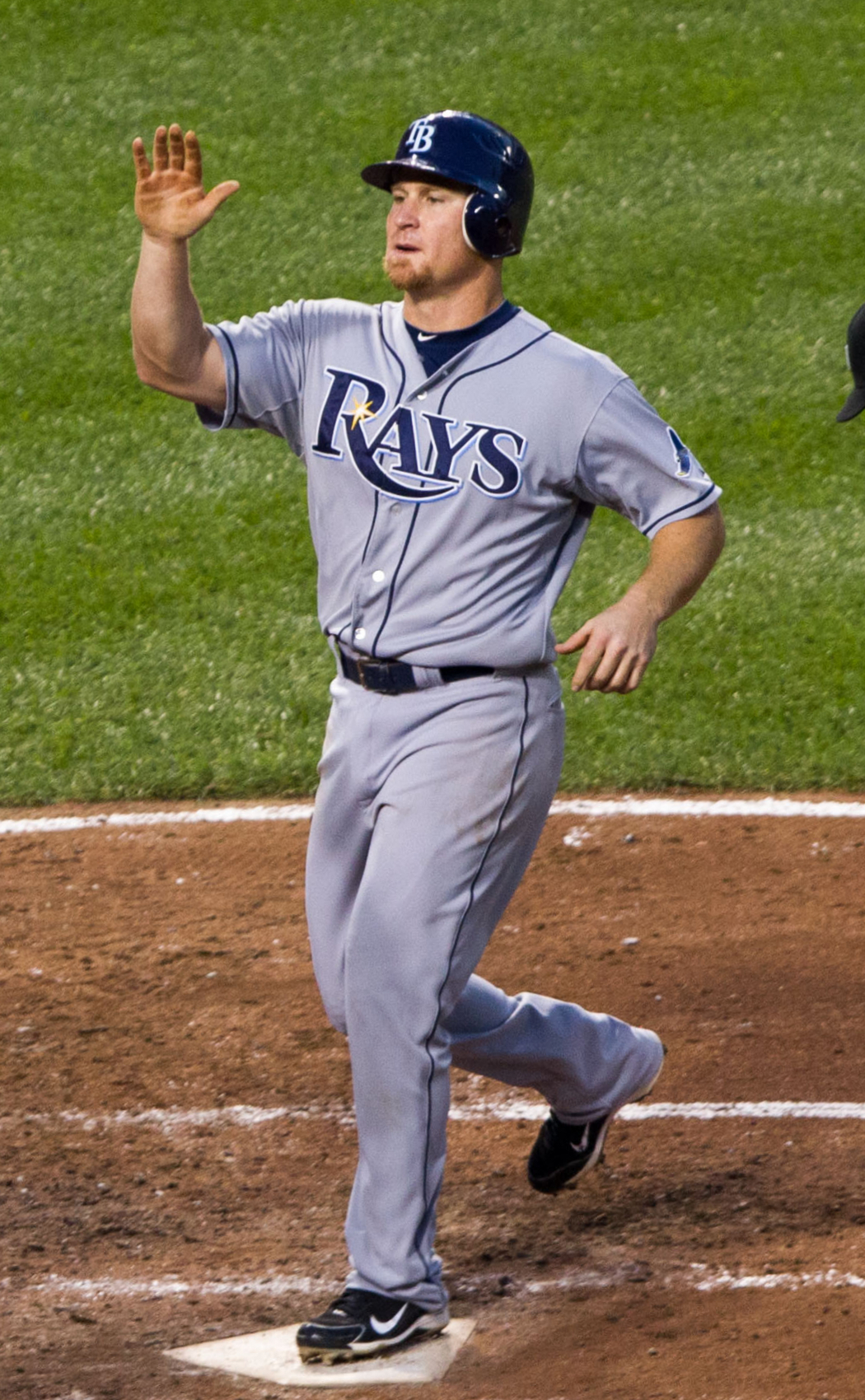
Conrad playing for the Tampa Bay Rays in 2012

On June 21, 2012, the Tampa Bay Rays claimed Conrad off waivers. On June 24, Conrad hit a pair of two-run doubles off Philadelphia Phillies pitcher Cliff Lee to secure a sweep in a day-night doubleheader. Conrad was designated for assignment on August 7 when Evan Longoria returned from the disabled list.

=== Hanshin Tigers ===
Conrad signed with the Hanshin Tigers of Nippon Professional Baseball for the 2013 season.

=== San Diego Padres ===
On January 4, 2014, Conrad and the San Diego Padres agreed to a minor league contract that did not include a spring training invitation. Conrad appeared in 13 games with the major league club, hitting .100 with one home run. The Padres designated Conrad for assignment on August 19. He was released by the organization on August 21.

=== New York Mets ===
Conrad joined the Sugar Land Skeeters for spring training on April 3, 2015. He signed a minor league contract with the New York Mets on April 25. In 83 appearances for the Triple-A Las Vegas 51s, Conrad slashed .194/.280/.319 with six home runs and 40 RBI. He elected free agency following the season on November 6.

=== Sugar Land Skeeters ===
Conrad signed with the Sugar Land Skeeters of the Atlantic League of Professional Baseball, an independent baseball league. In 20 games for the Skeeters, he hit .161/.329/.242 with one home run and five RBI. Conrad was released by Sugar Land on June 23, 2016.

On December 24, 2016, Conrad signed a minor league contract with the Kansas City Royals. However, he never appeared in a game for the organization.

== Coaching career ==
Conrad began his coaching career as the manager of the Burlington Royals in 2018. He was named as the manager for the Lexington Legends, the Royals' Low-A affiliate at the time, for the 2019 season. The Legends won the 2019 SAL championship, and Conrad remained the manager at Lexington through the 2020 season. Conrad was named manager of the Columbia Fireflies in 2021. Conrad became manager of the Quad Cities River Bandits, the Royals' High-A affiliate, before the 2022 season. On January 17, 2025, Conrad was promoted to serve as the manager of the Double-A Northwest Arkansas Naturals.

== See also ==
- List of Major League Baseball ultimate grand slams
