= Juan Abreu (pitcher) =

Dominican baseball player (born 1985)

- Pitcher
- Born: April 8, 1985 (age 41); San Francisco de Macoris, Dominican Republic
- Batted: Right Threw: Right

MLB debut
- August 29, 2011, for the Houston Astros

Last MLB appearance
- September 27, 2011, for the Houston Astros

MLB statistics
- Win–loss record: 0–0
- Earned run average: 2.70
- Strikeouts: 12
- Stats at Baseball Reference

Teams
- Houston Astros (2011)

Juan de Dios Abreu Reyes (born April 8, 1985) is a Dominican former professional baseball pitcher. He played in Major League Baseball for the Houston Astros in 2011.

== Baseball career ==
Abreu was originally signed as an amateur free agent by the Kansas City Royals on July 9, 2001, but did not play in the U.S. based leagues until 2005 when he joined the Royals rookie league team. He missed the 2007 season with an injury and reached AA with the Northwest Arkansas Naturals in 2009.

Abreu was signed as a minor league free agent by the Atlanta Braves before the 2010 season. He was traded to the Houston Astros along with Jordan Schafer, Paul Clemens, and Brett Oberholtzer for Michael Bourn on July 31, 2011. He was called up to the majors for the first time on August 25, 2011. He made his Major League debut as a relief pitcher against the Pittsburgh Pirates on August 29 and pitched in 7 games for the Astros in 2011, with a 2.70 ERA in 6.2 innings.

Abreu began the 2012 season with the Oklahoma RedHawks, the Astros' AAA affiliate, but was released after having a 7.09 ERA in 39 games played. On August 10, 2012, he was claimed off waivers by the Toronto Blue Jays, and optioned to their Triple-A affiliate Las Vegas 51s. He then pitched in four games for the 51s before being released by the Blue Jays.

He signed as a minor league free agent with the Los Angeles Dodgers on November 21, 2012, but never played because of an injury. He returned to the Dodgers organization in 2014 and played in eight games for the AAA Albuquerque Isotopes, with an ERA of 7.11. He was released on July 17, 2014.
