= 2010 St. Louis Cardinals season =

Major League Baseball season

2010 St. Louis Cardinals
- League: National League
- Division: Central
- Ballpark: Busch Stadium
- City: St. Louis, Missouri
- Record: 86–76 (.531)
- Divisional place: 2nd
- Owners: William DeWitt Jr., Fred Hanser
- General managers: John Mozeliak
- Managers: Tony La Russa
- Television: FSN Midwest (Dan McLaughlin, Al Hrabosky); KSDK (NBC 5) (Jay Randolph, Rick Horton)
- Radio: KTRS (Mike Shannon, John Rooney)

The 2010 St. Louis Cardinals season was the 129th season for the St. Louis Cardinals, a Major League Baseball franchise in St. Louis, Missouri. It was the 119th season for the Cardinals in the National League and their 5th at Busch Stadium III.

The Cardinals began their season on the road against the Cincinnati Reds on April 5. St. Louis was coming off a 91–71 (.562) season and first place in the National League Central, followed by a quick playoff exit when they were swept in the NLDS versus Los Angeles. In 2010, however, the Cardinals fell back to the same record of 2008 (86–76), finishing second in the National League Central to the Reds by five games.

== Offseason departures and acquisitions ==
=== Management ===
On October 26, 2009, Tony La Russa agreed to come back for a 15th season as manager of the Cardinals, thus extending his record for longest-serving manager in Cardinal history. Pitching coach and long-time LaRussa partner Dave Duncan, who earlier in 2009 had expressed displeasure with the franchise after his son Chris was traded, also agreed to return. However, hitting coach Hal McRae was fired after five seasons with the Cardinals and replaced with former Cardinal and former home run champion Mark McGwire. McGwire's hiring as hitting coach marked the slugger's first job in baseball since his retirement eight years prior. It was also his return to the public eye following his implication as a steroids user in Jose Canseco's book and his controversial 2005 appearance at the United States House Committee on Oversight and Government Reform's inquiry into the steroid scandal.

=== Hitters ===
The Cardinals announced on November 30 that backup catcher Jason LaRue was signed to a third season. It was LaRue's third straight one-year deal with St. Louis.

Mark DeRosa, acquired from the Indians via an in-season trade in 2009, left St. Louis via free agency, signing with the San Francisco Giants on Dec. 28. Troy Glaus, who hit 27 home runs as the third baseman for the 2008 Cardinals but was limited to 29 at-bats at the end of 2009 due to a shoulder injury, signed a contract with the Atlanta Braves on Jan 5 after passing a physical. Rick Ankiel, who started 2009 as the everyday center fielder but lost his starting job and struggled to a .285 OBP for the season, signed a one-year deal with the Kansas City Royals on Jan. 21. The same day, Khalil Greene, who started 2009 as the everyday shortstop for St. Louis but was sidelined with social anxiety disorder, signed a one-year deal to be a utility infielder for the Texas Rangers.

On January 7 the Cardinals announced that they had signed their 2009 trade deadline acquisition, left fielder Matt Holliday, to a seven-year $120 mil. deal with the Cardinals. It is the largest contract in club history, surpassing Albert Pujols seven-year $100 mil. deal in 2004. The contract includes a full no-trade clause, an average $17.0M per year salary through 2016, and a $17M vesting option for 2017 which will occur if he makes the Top 10 in the 2016 MVP voting. The buyout on the vesting option is $1M, making the total contract worth $120M. His uniform number changes from 15 to 7.

On February 27 the Cardinals completed a one-year deal with infielder Felipe López. Lopez, who hit .385 in a two-month stint with the 2008 Cardinals, was anticipated to fill a utility role. The acquisition of Lopez led the Cardinals to deal their other utility infielder, Julio Lugo, to the Baltimore Orioles for a player to be named later.

=== Pitchers ===
On November 4 St. Louis released Brad Thompson, who made his debut for the Cardinals in 2005 and was one of only six players remaining from the 2006 World Series champion Cardinals. Starting pitcher Joel Piñeiro, who had a career year for the 2009 Cardinals (3.49 ERA, 1.145 WHIP), capitalized by signing with the Anaheim Angels for two years and $16 million on Jan. 20. Starter Todd Wellemeyer, who struggled badly for the 2009 Cardinals, signed a minor-league deal with the Giants in February.

On December 8 the Cardinals announced the finalization of a deal to sign Brad Penny, who spent 2009 as a starter for the Red Sox and Giants, to a one-year deal for $7.5 million with an additional $1.5 million in incentives.

== Spring training ==
The Cardinals were 15–14 (.517) in 2010 compared to 19–12–2 (.613) [Team BA: .290; Team ERA: 4.35] in 2009's spring exhibitions. Attendance at Roger Dean Stadium was 96,910 for 14 games, averaging 6,922 per game.

Jaime García, a Cardinal draft pick who underwent Tommy John surgery in 2008 after a cup of coffee with the big-league club, won the fifth-starter role in spring training. David Freese won the starting job at third base. Allen Craig, Joe Mather and Nick Stavinoha filled out the Cardinal bench. On March 24, Yadier Molina suffered a right oblique muscle strain sliding into second base. Molina, batting .314 (11-for-35) at the time of his injury, missed the rest of spring training but was ready for Opening Day.

== Regular season ==
Whitey Herzog's number 24 was retired by the St. Louis Cardinals in 2010.

=== April ===
The Cardinals opened 2010 on April 5, on the road at Cincinnati. St. Louis won 11–6 on six effective innings from Chris Carpenter. Albert Pujols had two home runs. Colby Rasmus had a home run, and robbed Scott Rolen of a home run. Yadier Molina hit a grand slam home run, and became only the third Cardinals ever to do so on opening day. The other two Cardinals to ever do so, Mark McGwire and Scott Rolen, were also in attendance. In the home opener on April 12, St. Louis beat Houston 5–0 behind a three-run home run from Pujols and eight shutout innings from Adam Wainwright.

Jason LaRue became the first Cardinal to go on the disabled list on April 14, after suffering a strained hamstring. Bryan Anderson was called up from the minors to replace him on the roster.

On April 17 the Cardinals and Mets played a memorable game at Busch Stadium lasting 20 innings. The game lasted 6 hours and 53 minutes, ending with a 2–1 Mets' victory. This was only the 42nd game in baseball history that lasted as long as 20 innings. Backup outfielder Joe Mather took the loss after pitching and giving up a run in the 19th and 20th, after utility infielder Felipe López pitched a scoreless 18th. The Mets left 13 on-base, while the Cardinals stranded 22.

Lopez went on the DL on April 26. He had been suffering from elbow discomfort since April 11 but did not report the issue until two days after he pitched an inning against the Mets on April 17. Concurrent with Lopez's trip to the DL, the Cardinals sent Allen Craig to Memphis, recalled infielder Tyler Greene, and called up for his big-league debut Jon Jay, their second pick in the 2006 draft.

Buoyed by excellent pitching from 4/5 of their starting rotation (Lohse's 6.55 ERA for April made him the only Cardinal starter who didn't come in under 3.50 for the month), the Cardinals only lost one series in all of April, and they finished the month at 15–8, and in first place in the Central Division.

=== May ===
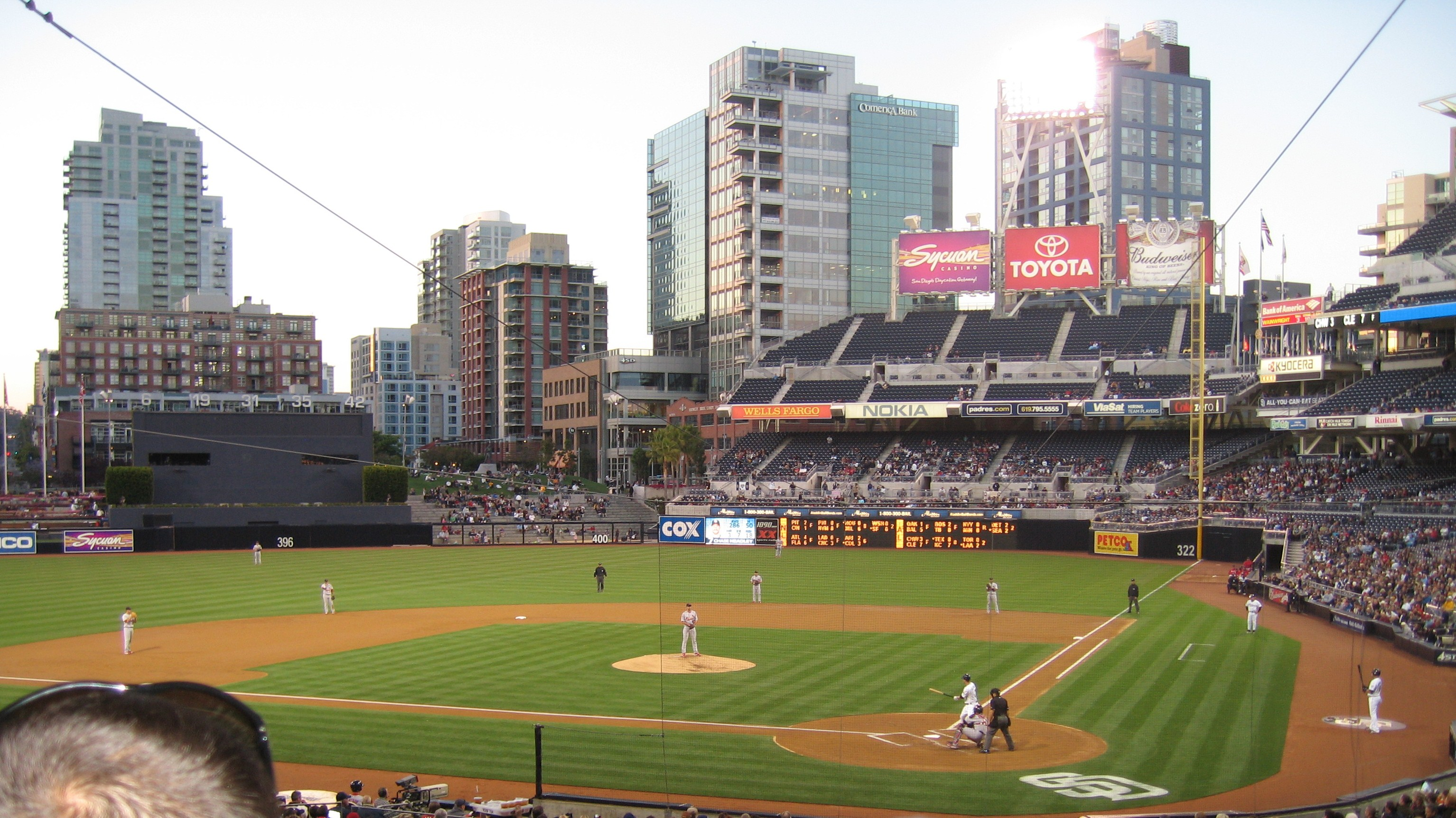
Cardinals at Padres, May 25

The Cardinals fell into a severe slump in early May. St. Louis lost 3 of 4 on the road to the East-leading Phillies, then, after taking two of three from Pittsburgh, returned home and were swept in three games by the Houston Astros, who were the worst team in the league prior to the series. A victory against the Reds with first place on the line included a two-run homer by Pujols, snapping a nine-game team homerless streak. However, subsequent losses to the Reds on May 15 and 16 knocked the Cardinals out of first place for the first time all season.

On May 17, Felipe López came off the DL and entered the starting lineup at shortstop. Brendan Ryan was demoted to a utility role due to a season-long slump that saw his average slide to .162 at the time he lost the starting job. In another effort to kickstart a stagnating offense on that same day, manager LaRussa switched Pujols and Matt Holliday in the lineup, with Holliday batting third and Pujols fourth. It was the first time Pujols had hit somewhere other than third in the lineup since May 30, 2003, but the change was short-lived, lasting only five days.

Brad Penny hit a grand slam in the third inning that proved decisive in St. Louis's 9–5 victory over the Anaheim Angels on May 21, but suffered a strained lat muscle in his back, apparently on the swing, and left the game immediately. The next day he went on the DL, and P. J. Walters was called up to take his place. St. Louis lost a second starting pitcher five days after Penny, when Kyle Lohse went to the DL on May 27 (retroactive to May 23), after being diagnosed with exertional compartment syndrome in his right (pitching) arm. Fernando Salas was called up from Memphis to replace Lohse on the roster. Shortly thereafter further roster moves resulted in the demotion of Joe Mather and Salas, and the promotion of two pitchers making their major league debuts: former Cardinals first-round draft pick Adam Ottavino and minor-league veteran Evan MacLane. The roster shuffling continued on May 31, when MacLane was sent back down without appearing in a game and Allen Craig was recalled.

The Cardinals offense continued to stall. On May 25 and 26 St. Louis lost consecutive games in San Diego by scores of 1–0 and 2–1. Both games were decided on home runs by Jerry Hairston Jr., who had zero home runs in 2010 entering the series. An 8–3 Cardinal victory on May 27 in the third game of the series featured Pujols' first home run since May 14 and only his second of the month. Three days later, on May 30, Pujols exploded out of his power slump by hitting three home runs in a 9–1 victory over the Cubs in Wrigley Field. It was the fourth three-homer game of his career and his first since 2006.

The suddenly surging Cardinal offense delivered a 12–4 victory over the Reds on May 31 that gave St. Louis a winning record for May (15–14) and put the Cardinals back into a first-place tie with Cincinnati.

=== June ===
On June 1, the Cardinals promoted Aaron Miles from Memphis and sent Allen Craig down. Miles, who played for St. Louis from 2006 through 2008, and was a member of the 2006 World Series champion Cardinals, signed a minor-league contract with St. Louis in the spring. Further bench maneuvering took place on June 5, when the Cardinals signed veteran outfielder Randy Winn, recently designated for assignment by the Yankees. Jon Jay was sent back down to Memphis to make room, and pitcher Kyle Lohse was sent to the 60-day DL.

Adam Wainwright threw a complete game two-hitter on June 4, and the Cardinals beat the Brewers 8–0, retaking sole possession of first place. It was the first shutout of Wainwright's career.

Jason Motte's outing on June 6, in which he took the loss in a 5–4, 10-inning defeat by the Brewers, snapped his streak of 32 consecutive batters retired. Motte was nine batters shy of the reliever record of 41 straight set by Bobby Jenks., and 13 shy of the major league record of 45 set by Mark Buehrle.

Seeking to shore up a rotation with gaping holes in the back end after the loss of Penny and Lohse, St. Louis acquired pitcher Jeff Suppan, a veteran of the 2006 World Series champion Cardinals and the MVP of the 2006 NLCS. Suppan, increasingly ineffective since he left St. Louis for the Milwaukee Brewers following the World Series victory, had an ERA of 7.84 when he was released by the Brewers in early June.

On June 30, Albert Pujols had his 37th career multihomer game at Busch Stadium tying Stan Musial's franchise record by a Cardinals' player.

David Freese went on the DL on June 30 with a bone bruise on his ankle. Freese suffered the injury on June 5 and had been playing in pain all month. The Cardinals, slowed by nagging injuries to Freese and Ludwick, plagued by poor performances from the back end of their rotation, and further weighed down by the season-long slumps of Ryan, Schumaker and Molina, trod water in June, going 13–13 to finish the month at 43–35.

=== July ===
On July 3, Ryan Ludwick went on the DL after he aggravated a prior left calf strain while exercising on a treadmill, and outfielder Jon Jay was recalled to take his place.

MLB announced rosters for the 2010 Major League Baseball All-Star Game on July 4, and five Cardinals made the NL team. Albert Pujols led the National League in votes. Yadier Molina was voted starting catcher for the NL squad despite having one of the worst seasons of his career, with a .229 batting average on the day the rosters were announced. Chris Carpenter and Adam Wainwright were named to the pitching staff, and Matt Holliday was selected as a reserve. In the game, played in Anaheim on July 13, Pujols was 0-for-2, Molina was 1-for-1 with a single, Holliday singled and scored, Wainwright pitched a scoreless seventh, but Carpenter was held back in reserve and did not pitch. Holliday scored on a three-run double by the Braves' Brian McCann that won the All-Star Game, 3–1, giving the National League their first win since the 1996.

On July 6, in Colorado, the Cardinals suffered one of the worst ninth-inning collapses in franchise history. Leading 9–3 going into the bottom of the ninth, Dennys Reyes and Ryan Franklin combined to give up nine runs to the Rockies, with Seth Smith's three-run walk-off homer capping an amazing 12–9 Colorado victory. It was the first time in 51 years that the Cardinals allowed nine runs in the ninth inning, and the first time St. Louis lost a game it led by seven runs or more since 1998. It also was the first time all season the Cardinals lost a game when they were leading after eight innings. Previously, they were a perfect 38–0. The next night, the Cardinals followed up that collapse by blowing leads of 5–0 and 7–4, losing to the Rockies 8–7 on another walk-off homer, this one by Chris Iannetta. After the Rockies completed a three-game sweep the next day, the Cardinals traveled to Houston and took two of three to go into the All-Star Break with a 47–41 record, one game behind the first-place Cincinnati Reds.

St. Louis won its last game before the break against Houston (July 11), then came out and won seven in a row against the Dodgers and Phillies (July 15–21) before losing the last home game in that stand 2–0 in 11 inn. The eight-game win streak was the longest by the Cardinals since the 105-win NL champions of 2004 won nine in a row. The Cardinals vaulted past Cincinnati and back into first place in the NL Central Division by 1 1/2 games.

Ryan Ludwick was activated from the DL on July 24, after having missed a month due to his calf injury. One week later, on July 31, Ludwick was traded at the non-waiver deadline to the San Diego Padres as part of a three-way deal. The Cardinals received minor league left-hand pitcher Nick Greenwood from the Padres and coveted starting pitcher Jake Westbrook from Cleveland along with cash considerations. Minor-league pitcher Corey Kluber went from the Padres to the Indians to complete the deal.

The Cardinals went 15–11 in July, their best month since April, and ended the month at 58–46 and a half-game ahead of the persistent Reds in the NL Central.

=== August ===
On August 3, David Freese, the everyday third baseman who missed more than a month after an ankle injury, re-injured the ankle and was sidelined for the rest of the year. More bad news came the next day, when key reliever Jason Motte was placed on the DL with a right shoulder sprain. Freese underwent reconstructive surgery on his right ankle the day after that, and will need six months of rehabilitation, leaving him uncertain for spring training in February 2011.

On August 6, Adam Wainwright pitched one of the best games of his career, throwing a complete game two-hit shutout to beat the Marlins, 7–0. Pujols hit his 28th home run (a 3-run shot) in the first inning, then added a fourth RBI later to grab the NL RBI lead with 82. The victory upped Wainwright's record to 16–6 (second in NL), and dropped his ERA to 2.07 (second in NL).

On August 10, the Cardinals and Reds had a nasty brawl at Great American Ball Park in Cincinnati. One day after Reds second baseman Brandon Phillips proclaimed "I really hate the Cardinals", Phillips and Yadier Molina had an argument at home plate that escalated into a bench-clearing brawl. Jason LaRue suffered a severe concussion after being kicked in the face by Reds pitcher Johnny Cueto, leading the Cardinals to call up minor-league catcher Steven Hill for his big-league debut. Jeff Suppan was placed on the DL with groin soreness unrelated to the brawl. The Cardinals swept the Reds in three games, dealing Cincinnati its first series loss since the All-Star Break and retaking sole possession of first place in the NL Central. In the third game, Wainwright held the Reds to two hits over seven shutout innings, dropping his ERA to 1.99. LaRue, still suffering from his concussion, was sent to the DL on the 13th.

Suspensions and fines for the brawl were announced on Aug. 12. Managers Dusty Baker and Tony La Russa each received two-game suspensions, and the Reds' pitcher Johnny Cueto was suspended for seven games, with Molina and Carpenter of the Cardinals fined along with the Reds' Brandon Phillips and Russ Springer. Bench coach Joe Pettini will be the acting manager.

Starting pitcher Kyle Lohse came off the DL almost three months after undergoing right forearm surgery to pitch the August 15 matchup against the Cubs. He pitched as poorly in that game as he did in April and May, and the Cardinals lost 9–7 to the Cubs. In that same game, Albert Pujols hit his 30th home run, extending his own major league record by hitting 30 or more home runs in 10 consecutive seasons starting with his rookie year.

After Freese's season-ending injury and a horrific slump by substitute 3b Felipe López, who was batting .165 since July 22, the Cardinals acquired Pedro Feliz from the Houston Astros on Aug. 19. The Cardinals also received cash considerations while the Astros received minor-league pitcher David Carpenter. Feliz was hitting .221 at the time of the trade. To make room on the roster, Jason LaRue was moved to the 60-day DL, officially ending his 2010 season except for the possibility of post-season play.

The team suffered badly after their big sweep of Cincinnati (August 9–11) with a season-high five-game losing streak that dropped them to 4 1/2 games behind the Reds for the NL Central title, and three games behind the Phillies in the wild-card race. On August 26, Albert Pujols hit his 400th career home run in Washington, becoming the third-youngest player to reach that milestone. Unfortunately, it came as part of an agonizing 11–10 extra-inning defeat to the Nationals, one in which St. Louis blew a 5–3 lead, scored four in the ninth to go ahead 10–8, then blew that lead when closer Ryan Franklin gave up a two-run homer in the bottom of the 9th. The Cardinals slipped to a ghastly 5–12 after the sweep of Cincinnati for the remainder of the month, with 11 of those losses coming to teams with losing records (the Cubs, Brewers, Pirates, Nationals, and Astros).

=== September ===
The Cardinals announced on September 1 that the team's new broadcasting station in 2011 will be a familiar one: KMOX, giving up on KTRS weak 5,000-watt reach for KMOX's 50,000-watt clear channel. Missouri native and longtime Chicago White Sox announcer John Rooney joined Shannon in the broadcast booth in the inaugural season with the new station. The team will presently keep its 50% ownership in KTRS, unless a good offer is made.

On September 1, the disastrous road trip concluded with a 5–2 loss at Houston for another losing streak of five games, the second time in the past 16 games played, tying their longest losing streak of the season. The 2–8 road trip dropped them 8 games behind Cincinnati, and 5 games out of the wild card. It was part of a pattern in which the Cardinals, who were in first place after sweeping the Reds in August and looking towards a schedule filled with bad teams, choked away the Central Division by showing an utter inability to beat those bad teams. Between the Cubs series on August 13, which immediately followed the sweep of Cincinnati, and a series against the Pirates that ended on September 23, St. Louis played eight series against teams with losing records, and lost all of them. During this stretch the Cardinals also played their last series of the season against Cincinnati. St. Louis took two of three at home but the Reds remained far ahead in the NL Central.

On September 11, Albert Pujols reached 100 RBIs for the 10th consecutive year and drove in all three runs giving him 102 for the season, but the team lost in extra innings 6–3 at Atlanta. Only Al Simmons has a longer streak at the beginning of a career, 11 years (1924–1934). Pujols joins Jimmie Foxx, Lou Gehrig, and Alex Rodriguez in having 10 consecutive seasons of 100+ RBIs at any time in their career. Only two other players have 10 consecutive years of 30 HRs and 100 RBIs at any time in their careers: Foxx and Rodriguez.

On September 19, catcher Jason LaRue, still suffering from the severe concussion he received on August 10 when Cueto kicked him in the head numerous times, announced his retirement from baseball effective at the end of the season. Another player departed two days later, when infielder Felipe López was given his unconditional release. The cited cause was repeated tardiness.

On September 23, catcher Yadier Molina was ruled out for the remainder of the season because of continuing soreness in his right knee after an examination in St. Louis. Pitcher Jaime García joined Molina on the shelf when the Cardinals decided he would sit out the remainder of the season, citing his Tommy John arm surgery (in September 2008) and heavy 2010 workload. Garcia led all rookie pitchers with 13 wins, and posted the fourth-best (2.70) ERA in the NL,

One bit of good news penetrated the Cardinals' terrible month: Adam Wainwright won his 20th game on September 24. After a strained muscle led the Cardinals to sit Wainwright for his last scheduled start, he finished at 20–11 with a 2.42 ERA. Four days after Wainwright's 20th victory, on September 28, St. Louis was eliminated from playoff contention. After it no longer mattered, the Cardinals won 9 of their last 11 games to finish 86–76. At season's end, Pujols became the second player in the last sixty years (the first was Hank Aaron), to lead the National League in runs, home runs, and runs batted in, and not be named Most Valuable Player.

Despite their lower finish in the standings, the team drew 3,300,218 fans, the seventh consecutive year over 3 million and sixth over 3.3 million. Only three other teams drew more.

=== Season standings ===
==== National League Central ====
NL Central
Team	W	L	Pct.	GB	Home	Road
Cincinnati Reds	91	71	.562	—	49‍–‍32	42‍–‍39
St. Louis Cardinals	86	76	.531	5	52‍–‍29	34‍–‍47
Milwaukee Brewers	77	85	.475	14	40‍–‍41	37‍–‍44
Houston Astros	76	86	.469	15	42‍–‍39	34‍–‍47
Chicago Cubs	75	87	.463	16	35‍–‍46	40‍–‍41
Pittsburgh Pirates	57	105	.352	34	40‍–‍41	17‍–‍64

==== National League Wild Card ====
Division leaders
Team	W	L	Pct.
Philadelphia Phillies	97	65	.599
San Francisco Giants	92	70	.568
Cincinnati Reds	91	71	.562

Wild Card team (Top team qualifies for postseason)
Team	W	L	Pct.	GB
Atlanta Braves	91	71	.562	—
San Diego Padres	90	72	.556	1
St. Louis Cardinals	86	76	.531	5
Colorado Rockies	83	79	.512	8
Florida Marlins	80	82	.494	11
Los Angeles Dodgers	80	82	.494	11
New York Mets	79	83	.488	12
Milwaukee Brewers	77	85	.475	14
Houston Astros	76	86	.469	15
Chicago Cubs	75	87	.463	16
Washington Nationals	69	93	.426	22
Arizona Diamondbacks	65	97	.401	26
Pittsburgh Pirates	57	105	.352	34

==== Record vs. opponents ====
2010 National League record Source: MLB Standings Grid – 2010
Team	AZ	ATL	CHC	CIN	COL	FLA	HOU	LAD	MIL	NYM	PHI	PIT	SD	SF	STL	WSH	AL
Arizona	–	3–4	1–6	2–5	9–9	3–3	4–3	5–13	3–4	5–1	2–4	2–4	8–10	5–13	4–5	3–4	6–9
Atlanta	4–3	–	4–2	3–2	2–4	11–7	5–1	5–3	5–2	11–7	8–10	6–3	4–2	4–3	2–6	8–10	9–6
Chicago	6–1	2–4	–	4–12	2–3	4–2	7–11	3–4	9–6	3–4	4–2	5–10	3–5	2–5	9–6	4–2	8–10
Cincinnati	5–2	2–3	12–4	–	2–5	5–2	10–5	5–4	11–3	4–2	2–5	10–6	2–4	3–4	6–12	4–3	8–7
Colorado	9–9	4–2	3–2	5–2	–	3–4	2–4	7–11	5–4	3–3	1–6	3–4	12–6	9–9	3–4	5–3	9–6
Florida	3–3	7–11	2–4	2–5	4–3	–	3–3	4–2	4–4	12–6	5–13	6–2	3–6	2–5	3–2	13–5	7–8
Houston	3–4	1–5	11–7	5–10	4–2	3–3	–	2–4	8–7	3–4	4–3	11–4	2–5	2–7	10–5	4–4	3–12
Los Angeles	13–5	3–5	4–3	4–5	11–7	2–4	4–2	–	4–2	3–4	2–4	4–3	8–10	8–10	3–4	3–3	4–11
Milwaukee	4–3	2–5	6–9	3–11	4–5	4–4	7–8	2–4	–	5–2	1–5	13–5	3–4	2–5	8–7	4–2	9–6
New York	1–5	7–11	4–3	2–4	3–3	6–12	4–3	4–3	2–5	–	9–9	6–1	3–3	3–4	3–3	9–9	13–5
Philadelphia	4–2	10–8	2–4	5–2	6–1	13–5	3–4	4–2	5–1	9–9	–	2–4	5–2	3–3	4–4	12–6	10–8
Pittsburgh	4–2	3–6	10–5	6–10	4–3	2–6	4–11	3–4	5–13	1–6	4–2	–	0–6	2–4	6–9	1–5	2–13
San Diego	10–8	2–4	5–3	4–2	6–12	6–3	5–2	10–8	4–3	3–3	2–5	6–0	–	12–6	3–4	3–3	9–6
San Francisco	13–5	3–4	5–2	4–3	9–9	5–2	7–2	10–8	5–2	4–3	3–3	4–2	6–12	–	3–3	4–2	7–8
St. Louis	5–4	6–2	6–9	12–6	4–3	2–3	5–10	4–3	7–8	3–3	4–4	9–6	4–3	3–3	–	3–3	9–6
Washington	4–3	10–8	2–4	3–4	3–5	5–13	4–4	3–3	2–4	9–9	6–12	5–1	3–3	2–4	3–3	–	5–13

MLB Standings

== Game log ==
Regular Season Schedule (calendar style)
Regular Season Schedule (sortable text)
All game times are in Central Time Zone.

Legend
Cardinals WIN	Cardinals LOSS	Game POSTPONED

2010 Game Log
APRIL (15-8)

#	Date	Opponent / Time	Score	Win	Loss	Save	Attendance	Record
1	April 5	@ Reds 12:10 pm (FSM / ESPN)	11 – 6	Carpenter (1-0)	Harang (0-1)		42,493	1-0
2	April 7	@ Reds 6:10 pm (FSM)	6 – 3	Wainwright (1-0)	Herrera (0-1)	Franklin (1)	28,132	2-0
3	April 8	@ Reds 11:35 am (FSM)	2 – 1	Cordero (1-0)	Motte (0-1)		13,445	2-1
4	April 9	@ Brewers 7:10 pm (FSM)	5 – 4	Reyes (1-0)	Hoffman (0-1)	Franklin (2)	34,018	3-1
5	April 10	@ Brewers 2:10 pm (Fox)	7 – 1	García (1-0)	Gallardo (0-2)		42,039	4-1
6	April 11	@ Brewers 7:05 pm (ESPN)	8 – 7	Hoffman (1-1)	McClellan (0-1)		33,294	4-2
7	April 12	Astros 3:15 pm (FSM)	5 – 0	Wainwright (2-0)	Rodríguez (0-2)		46,918	5-2
8	April 14	Astros 7:15 pm (FSM)	2 – 1	Penny (1-0)	Myers (0-1)	Franklin (3)	35,883	6-2
9	April 15	Astros 12:40 pm (FSM)	5 – 1	Norris (1-1)	Lohse (0-1)		35,371	6-3
10	April 16	Mets 7:15 pm (FSM)	4 – 3	Carpenter (2-0)	Nieve (0-1)	Franklin (4)	40,101	7-3
11	April 17	Mets 3:10 pm (Fox)	2 – 1 (20)	Rodríguez (1-0)	Mather (0-1)	Pelfrey (1)	43,709	7-4
12	April 18	Mets 7:05 pm (ESPN)	5 – 3	Wainwright (3-0)	Stoner (0-1)		40,007	8-4
13	April 19	@ Diamondbacks 8:40 pm (FSM)	4 – 2	Penny (2-0)	Boyer (1-2)	Franklin (5)	24,167	9-4
14	April 20	@ Diamondbacks 8:40 pm (FSM)	9 – 7	Haren (2-1)	Boggs (0-1)	Qualls (2)	19,855	9-5
15	April 21	@ Diamondbacks 8:40 pm (FSM)	9 – 4	Motte (1-1)	Qualls (0-1)		19,165	10-5
16	April 23	@ Giants 9:15 pm (FSM)	4 – 1	Lincecum (4-0)	García (1-1)	Wilson (3)	42,860	10-6
17	April 24	@ Giants 8:05 pm (FSM)	2 – 0	Zito (3-0)	Wainwright (3-1)	Wilson (4)	41,785	10-7
18	April 25	@ Giants 3:05 pm (KSDK)	2 – 0	Penny (3-0)	Cain (0-1)	Franklin (6)	40,230	11-7
19	April 26	Braves 7:15 pm (FSM)	4 – 3	Reyes (2-0)	Saito (0-1)	Franklin (7)	35,257	12-7
20	April 27	Braves 7:15 pm (FSM)	5 – 4	Carpenter (3-0)	Lowe (3-2)	Motte (1)	35,587	13-7
21	April 28	Braves 7:15 pm (FSM)	6 – 0	García (2-1)	Kawakami (0-4)		35,693	14-7
22	April 29	Braves 12:40 pm (FSM)	10 – 4	Wainwright (4-1)	Jurrjens (0-3)		39,561	15-7
23	April 30	Reds 7:15 pm (FSM)	3 – 2	Cueto (1-1)	Penny (3-1)	Cordero (9)	39,850	15-8

MAY (15-14)

#	Date	Opponent / Time	Score	Win	Loss	Save	Attendance	Record
24	May 1	Reds 12:10 pm (FSM)	6 – 3	Franklin (1-0)	Fisher (0-1)		41,536	16-8
25	May 2	Reds 1:15 pm (KSDK)	6 – 0	Carpenter (4-0)	Harang (1-4)		43,292	17-8
26	May 3	@ Phillies 6:05 pm (FSM)	6 – 3	García (3-1)	Blanton (0-1)		44,817	18-8
27	May 4	@ Phillies 6:05 pm (FSM)	2 – 1 (10)	Contreras (2-1)	Hawksworth (0-1)		44,890	18-9
28	May 5	@ Phillies 6:05 pm (FSM)	4 – 0	Kendrick (1-1)	Penny (3-2)		44,261	18-10
29	May 6	@ Phillies 12:05 pm (FSM)	7 – 2	Halladay (6-1)	Lohse (0-2)		44,831	18-11
30	May 7	@ Pirates 6:05 pm (FSM)	4 – 3	Franklin (2-0)	Meek (1-1)		16,473	19-11
31	May 8	@ Pirates 6:05 pm (FSM)	2 – 0	Karstens (1-1)	García (3-2)	Dotel (6)	25,047	19-12
32	May 9	@ Pirates 12:35 pm (KSDK)	11 – 4	Wainwright (5-1)	Maholm (2-3)		17,342	20-12
33	May 11	Astros 7:15 pm (FSM)	6 – 3	Myers (2-2)	Penny (3-3)	Lindstrom (7)	35,875	20-13
34	May 12	Astros 7:15 pm (FSM)	9 – 6	Rodríguez (2-4)	Lohse (0-3)	Lindstrom (8)	36,342	20-14
35	May 13	Astros 12:40 pm (FSM)	4 – 1	Norris (2-4)	Carpenter (4-1)	Lindstrom (9)	39,026	20-15
36	May 14	@ Reds 6:10 pm (FSM)	4 – 3	García (4-2)	Harang (2-5)	Franklin (8)	27,568	21-15
37	May 15	@ Reds 6:10 pm (FSM)	4 – 3	Leake (4-0)	Wainwright (5-2)	Cordero (12)	41,326	21-16
38	May 16	@ Reds 12:10 pm (FSM)	7 – 2	Arroyo (3-2)	Penny (3-4)		26,712	21-17
39	May 17	Nationals 7:15 pm (FSM)	6 – 2	Lohse (1-3)	Stammen (1-2)		38,005	22-17
40	May 18	Nationals 7:15 pm (FSM)	3 – 2	Carpenter (5-1)	Clippard (7-3)	Franklin (9)	36,345	23-17
41	May 19	Marlins 7:15 pm (FSM)	5 – 1	Sánchez (3-2)	Hawksworth (0-2)		40,766	23-18
42	May 20	Marlins 12:40 pm (FSM)	4 – 2	Wainwright (6-2)	Robertson (4-4)	Franklin (10)	37,861	24-18
43	May 21	Angels 7:15 pm (FSM)	9 – 5	Motte (2-1)	Piñeiro (3-5)		44,111	25-18
44	May 22	Angels 1:15 pm (FSM)	10 – 7	Kazmir (3-4)	Lohse (1-4)		44,091	25-19
45	May 23	Angels 1:15 pm (KSDK)	6 – 5 (10)	Franklin (3-0)	Shields (0-2)		42,417	26-19
46	May 25	@ Padres 9:05 pm (FSM)	1 – 0	Garland (6-2)	Wainwright (6-3)	Bell (13)	18,236	26-20
47	May 26	@ Padres 9:05 pm (FSM)	2 – 1 (13)	Mujica (2-0)	Boggs (0-2)		19,752	26-21
48	May 27	@ Padres 5:35 pm (FSM)	8 – 3	Walters (1-0)	LeBlanc (2-3)		20,583	27-21
49	May 28	@ Cubs 1:20 pm (FSM)	7 – 1	Carpenter (6-1)	Wells (3-3)		39,536	28-21
50	May 29	@ Cubs 3:10 pm (Fox)	5 – 0	Silva (7-0)	Ottavino (0-1)		40,601	28-22
51	May 30	@ Cubs 1:20 pm (KSDK / TBS)	9 – 1	Wainwright (7-3)	Dempster (3-5)		41,353	29-22
52	May 31	Reds 3:15 pm (FSM)	12 – 4	García (5-2)	Arroyo (5-3)		40,782	30-22

JUNE (13-13)

#	Date	Opponent / Time	Score	Win	Loss	Save	Attendance	Record
53	June 1	Reds 7:15 pm (FSM)	9 – 8	Del Rosario (1-0)	Reyes (2-1)	Cordero (16)	37,414	30-23
54	June 2	Reds 7:15 pm (FSM / ESPN)	4 – 1	Carpenter (7-1)	LeCure (1-1)	McClellan (1)	39,295	31-23
55	June 4	Brewers 7:15 pm (FSM)	8 – 0	Wainwright (8-3)	Wolf (4-5)		43,261	32-23
56	June 5	Brewers 3:10 pm (Fox)	5 – 4 (11)	Boggs (1-2)	Axford (1-1)		44,180	33-23
57	June 6	Brewers 7:05 pm (ESPN)	4 – 3 (10)	Braddock (1-0)	Motte (2-2)	Axford (4)	40,467	33-24
58	June 7	@ Dodgers 9:10 pm (FSM)	12 – 4	Monasterios (3-0)	Hawksworth (0-3)		44,876	33-25
59	June 8	@ Dodgers 9:10 pm (FSM)	1 – 0	Kuo (2-1)	Miller (0-1)	Broxton (15)	48,046	33-26
60	June 9	@ Dodgers 9:10 pm (FSM)	4 – 3	Kershaw (6-3)	Wainwright (8-4)	Broxton (16)	43,299	33-27
61	June 11	@ Diamondbacks 8:40 pm (FSM)	5 – 2	García (6-2)	Lopez (2-5)	Franklin (11)	20,629	34-27
62	June 12	@ Diamondbacks 7:10 pm (FSM)	7 – 2	Haren (7-4)	Ottavino (0-2)		30,017	34-28
63	June 13	@ Diamondbacks 3:10 pm (KSDK)	7 – 5	Vásquez (1-2)	McClellan (0-2)		23,922	34-29
64	June 14	Mariners 6:09 pm (FSM, ESPN)	9 – 3	Wainwright (9-4)	French (0-1)		36,113	35-29
65	June 15	Mariners 7:15 pm (FSM)	4 – 2	Hawksworth (1-3)	Rowland-Smith (0-6)	Franklin (12)	40,269	36-29
66	June 16	Mariners 7:15 pm (FSM)	2 – 1	Vargas (5-2)	García (6-3)	Aardsma (14)	40,020	36-30
67	June 18	Athletics 7:15 pm (FSM)	6 – 4	Carpenter (8-1)	Ziegler (2-4)	Franklin (13)	40,083	37-30
68	June 19	Athletics 6:15 pm (FSM)	4 – 3	Wainwright (10-4)	Sheets (2-7)	Motte (2)	43,682	38-30
69	June 20	Athletics 1:15 pm (FSM)	3 – 2	Breslow (2-1)	Hawksworth (1-4)	Bailey (13)	42,271	38-31
70	June 22	@ Blue Jays 6:07 pm (FSM)	9 – 4	García (7-3)	Cecil (7-4)		16,830	39-31
71	June 23	@ Blue Jays 6:07 pm (FSM)	1 – 0	Carpenter (9-1)	Gregg (0-3)	Franklin (14)	14,079	40-31
72	June 24	@ Blue Jays 6:07 pm (FSM)	5 – 0	Morrow (5-5)	Wainwright (10-5)		12,392	40-32
73	June 25	@ Royals 7:10 pm (FSM)	4 – 2	Greinke (3-8)	Suppan (0-3)	Soria (18)	38,916	40-33
74	June 26	@ Royals 1:10 pm (FSM)	5 – 3	Hawksworth (2-4)	Davies (4-6)	Franklin (15)	38,457	41-33
75	June 27	@ Royals 1:10 pm (KSDK)	10 – 3	Chen (4-2)	García (7-4)		32,938	41-34
76	June 28	Diamondbacks 7:15 pm (FSM)	6 – 5	Motte (3-2)	Heilman (2-2)		41,578	42-34
77	June 29	Diamondbacks 7:15 pm (FSM)	8 – 0	Wainwright (11-5)	Willis (2-3)		38,736	43-34
78	June 30	Diamondbacks 1:15 pm (FSM)	4 – 2	Enright (1-0)	Suppan (0-4)	Heilman (3)	36,962	43-35

JULY (15-11)

#	Date	Opponent / Time	Score	Win	Loss	Save	Attendance	Record
79	July 1	Brewers 7:15 pm (FSM)	4 – 1	Wolf (6-7)	Hawksworth (2-5)	Axford (9)	40,302	43-36
80	July 2	Brewers 7:15 pm (FSM)	5 – 0	García (8-4)	Narveson (7-5)		43,028	44-36
81	July 3	Brewers 5:35 pm (KSDK)	12 – 5	Parra (3-5)	Carpenter (9-2)		43,276	44-37
82	July 4	Brewers 1:15 pm (FSM)	7 – 1	Wainwright (12-5)	Gallardo (8-4)		38,581	45-37
83	July 6	@ Rockies 7:40 pm (FSM)	12 – 9	Corpas (3-5)	Franklin (3-1)		32,922	45-38
84	July 7	@ Rockies 7:40 pm (FSM)	8 – 7	Street (1-1)	MacLane (0-1)		32,251	45-39
85	July 8	@ Rockies 2:10 pm (FSM)	4 – 2	Jiménez (15-1)	Carpenter (9-3)	Street (3)	37,456	45-40
86	July 9	@ Astros 7:05 pm (FSM)	8 – 0	Wainwright (13-5)	Norris (2-6)		33,224	46-40
87	July 10	@ Astros 6:05 pm (FSM)	4 – 1	Myers (6-6)	Suppan (0-5)	Lindstrom (21)	37,518	46-41
88	July 11	@ Astros 1:05 pm (KSDK)	4 – 2	Hawksworth (3-5)	Rodríguez (6-11)	Franklin (16)	32,975	47-41
--	July 13	All-Star Game	National League 3, American League 1 (Anaheim, California Angel Stadium)					
89	July 15	Dodgers 7:15 pm (FSM)	7 – 1	Carpenter (10-3)	Kershaw (9-5)		41,771	48-41
90	July 16	Dodgers 7:15 pm (FSM)	8 – 4	McClellan (1-2)	Billingsley (7-5)		44,074	49-41
91	July 17	Dodgers 3:10 pm (Fox)	2 – 0	Wainwright (14-5)	Kuroda (7-8)	Franklin (17)	43,667	50-41
92	July 18	Dodgers 1:15 pm (KSDK)	5 – 4	Franklin (4-1)	Broxton (3-1)		40,743	51-41
93	July 19	Phillies 6:09 pm (FSM / ESPN)	8 – 4	Hawksworth (4-5)	Kendrick (5-4)		40,253	52-41
94	July 20	Phillies 7:15 pm (FSM)	7 – 1	Carpenter (11-3)	Carpenter (0-1)		38,712	53-41
95	July 21	Phillies 7:15 pm (FSM)	5 – 1	García (9-4)	Blanton (3-6)	Franklin (18)	41,089	54-41
96	July 22	Phillies 1:15 pm (FSM)	2 – 0 (11)	Durbin (2-1)	McClellan (1-3)	Lidge (8)	40,062	54-42
97	July 23	@ Cubs 1:20 pm (FSM)	5 – 0	Wells (5-7)	Suppan (0-6)		40,687	54-43
98	July 24	@ Cubs 12:05 pm (FSM)	6 – 5	Gorzelanny (6-5)	Hawksworth (4-6)	Mármol (18)	41,009	54-44
99	July 25	@ Cubs 7:05 pm (ESPN)	4 – 3 (11)	Franklin (5-1)	Schlitter (0-1)	Reyes (1)	41,406	55-44
100	July 27	@ Mets 6:10 pm (FSM)	8 – 2	Niese (7-4)	Wainwright (14-6)		37,479	55-45
101	July 28	@ Mets 6:10 pm (FSM)	8 – 7 (13)	MacDougal (1-0)	Feliciano (2-6)	Franklin (19)	35,009	56-45
102	July 29	@ Mets 11:10 am (FSM)	4 – 0	Dickey (7-4)	Hawksworth (4-7)	Rodríguez (22)	40,087	56-46
103	July 30	Pirates 7:15 pm (FSM)	1 – 0 (10)	Franklin (6-1)	Lopez (2-2)		44,534	57-46
104	July 31	Pirates 6:15 pm (FSM)	11 – 1	Suppan (1-6)	McCutchen (1-5)		45,783	58-46

AUGUST (11-15)

#	Date	Opponent / Time	Score	Win	Loss	Save	Attendance	Record
105	August 1	Pirates 1:15 pm (KSDK)	9 – 1	Wainwright (15-6)	Duke (5-10)		43,338	59-46
106	August 2	Astros 7:15 pm (FSM)	9 – 4	Figueroa (3-1)	MacDougal (1-1)		43,369	59-47
107	August 3	Astros 7:15 pm (FSM)	18 – 4	Norris (4-7)	García (9-5)		41,958	59-48
108	August 4	Astros 7:15 pm (FSM)	8 – 4	Carpenter (12-3)	Happ (2-1)		41,596	60-48
109	August 6	@ Marlins 6:10 pm (FSM)	7 – 0	Wainwright (16-6)	Nolasco (12-8)		19,223	61-48
110	August 7	@ Marlins 6:10 pm (FSM)	5 – 4 (10)	Hensley (2-4)	Franklin (6-2)		24,344	61-49
--	August 8	@ Marlins 12:10 pm (KSDK)	PPD. RAIN (make-up, Mon. September 20)					
111	August 9	@ Reds 6:10 pm (FSM / ESPN)	7 – 3	Carpenter (13-3)	Leake (7-4)		36,353	62-49
112	August 10	@ Reds 6:10 pm (FSM)	8 – 4	García (10-5)	Cueto (11-3)	Franklin (20)	36,964	63-49
113	August 11	@ Reds 11:35 am (FSM)	6 – 1	Wainwright (17-6)	Arroyo (12-7)		33,364	64-49
114	August 13	Cubs 7:15 pm (FSM)	6 – 3	Westbrook (7-7)	Diamond (0-3)	Franklin (21)	45,546	65-49
115	August 14	Cubs 3:10 pm (Fox)	3 – 2	Zambrano (4-6)	Carpenter (13-4)	Mármol (20)	46,313	65-50
116	August 15	Cubs 1:15 pm (KSDK)	9 – 7	Dempster (11-8)	Lohse (1-5)	Mármol (21)	44,074	65-51
117	August 17	Brewers 7:15 pm (FSM)	3 – 2	Bush (6-10)	García (10-6)	Axford (18)	45,380	65-52
118	August 18	Brewers 1:15 pm (FSM)	3 – 2	Wolf (10-9)	Wainwright (17-7)	Hoffman (7)	41,400	65-53
119	August 20	Giants 7:15 pm (FSM)	6 – 3	Bumgarner (5-4)	Westbrook (7-8)	Wilson (35)	43,822	65-54
120	August 21	Giants 6:15 pm (FSM)	5 – 1	Carpenter (14-4)	Lincecum (11-8)		44,477	66-54
121	August 22	Giants 1:15 pm (KSDK)	9 – 0	García (11-6)	Zito (8-8)		42,638	67-54
122	August 23	@ Pirates 6:05 pm (FSM)	10 – 2	Lohse (2-5)	Ohlendorf (1-11)		12,393	68-54
123	August 24	@ Pirates 6:05 pm (FSM)	4 – 3	Hanrahan (3-1)	Wainwright (17-8)	Meek (2)	13,302	68-55
124	August 25	@ Pirates 6:05 pm (FSM)	5 – 2	McCutchen (2-5)	Westbrook (7-9)		12,686	68-56
125	August 26	@ Nationals 6:05 pm (FSM)	11 – 10 (13)	Slaten (4-1)	Hawksworth (4-8)		22,317	68-57
126	August 27	@ Nationals 6:05 pm (FSM)	4 – 2	García (12-6)	Olsen (3-7)	Franklin (22)	22,871	69-57
127	August 28	@ Nationals 6:05 pm (FSM)	14 – 5	Hernández (9-9)	Lohse (2-6)		30,688	69-58
128	August 29	@ Nationals 12:35 pm (KSDK)	4 – 2	Lannan (6-6)	Wainwright (17-9)	Storen (3)	24,782	69-59
129	August 30	@ Astros 7:05 pm (FSM)	3 – 0	Happ (5-2)	Westbrook (7-10)		23,140	69-60
130	August 31	@ Astros 7:05 pm (FSM)	3 – 0	Rodríguez (11-12)	Carpenter (14-5)	Lyon (10)	29,307	69-61

SEPTEMBER (14-15)

#	Date	Opponent / Time	Score	Win	Loss	Save	Attendance	Record
131	September 1	@ Astros 1:05 pm (FSM)	5 – 2	Figuroa (4-2)	Suppan (1-7)	Lyon (11)	22,068	69-62
132	September 3	Reds 7:15 pm (FSM)	3 – 2	García (13-6)	Arroyo (14-9)	Franklin (23)	43,540	70-62
133	September 4	Reds 3:10 pm (Fox)	6 – 1	Wood (5-2)	Wainwright (17-10)		44,597	70-63
134	September 5	Reds 1:15 pm (KSDK)	4 – 2	Carpenter (15-5)	Bailey (3-3)	Franklin (24)	43,963	71-63
135	September 6	@ Brewers 1:10 pm (FSM)	8 – 6	Boggs (2-2)	Braddock (1-2)		35,190	72-63
136	September 7	@ Brewers 7:10 pm (FSM)	4 – 2	Narveson (11-7)	Lohse (2-7)	Hoffman (9)	33,149	72-64
137	September 8	@ Brewers 7:10 pm (FSM)	8 – 1	Capuano (3-3)	García (13-7)		34,298	72-65
138	September 9	@ Braves 6:10 pm (FSM)	11 – 4	Wainwright (18-10)	Jurrjens (7-5)		20,776	73-65
139	September 10	@ Braves 6:35 pm (FSM)	8 – 6	Moylan (6-2)	Carpenter (15-6)	Wagner (33)	40,656	73-66
140	September 11	@ Braves 3:10 pm (Fox)	6 – 3 (12)	Kimbrel (3-0)	Boggs (2-3)		51,078	73-67
141	September 12	@ Braves 7:05 pm (ESPN)	7 – 3	Lohse (3-7)	Hudson (15-8)		27,156	74-67
142	September 13	Cubs 7:15 pm (FSM)	5 – 1	Samardzija (1-1)	García (13-8)		40,720	74-68
143	September 14	Cubs 7:15 pm (FSM)	7 – 2	Wells (7-13)	Wainwright (18-11)		40,509	74-69
144	September 15	Cubs 7:15 pm (FSM / ESPN)	7 – 3	Zambrano (9-6)	Carpenter (15-7)		41,145	74-70
145	September 16	Padres 7:15 pm (FSM)	4 – 0	Westbrook (8-10)	Stauffer (4-4)		38,252	75-70
146	September 17	Padres 7:15 pm (FSM)	14 – 4	Lohse (4-7)	Latos (14-7)		37,806	76-70
147	September 18	Padres 3:10 pm (Fox)	8 – 4	Adams (4-1)	McClellan (1-4)		40,205	76-71
148	September 19	Padres 1:15 pm (KSDK)	4 – 1	Wainwright (19-11)	Garland (14-12)	Franklin (25)	37,885	77-71
149	September 20	@ Marlins 2:10 pm (KSDK)	4 – 0	Volstad (10-9)	Carpenter (15-8)		20,955	77-72
150	September 21	@ Pirates 6:05 pm (FSM)	5 – 2	Maholm (8-15)	Westbrook (8-11)	Meek (4)	15,478	77-73
151	September 22	@ Pirates 6:05 pm (FSM)	11 – 6	Morton (2-11)	Lohse (4-8)		11,785	77-74
152	September 23	@ Pirates 11:35 am (FSM)	9 – 2	Suppan (2-7)	Burres (3-4)		15,802	78-74
153	September 24	@ Cubs 1:20 pm (FSM)	7 – 1	Wainwright (20-11)	Gorzelanny (7-9)		36,553	79-74
154	September 25	@ Cubs 12:05 pm (FSM)	7 – 3	Coleman (3-2)	Carpenter (15-9)		39,316	79-75
155	September 26	@ Cubs 1:20 pm (KSDK)	8 – 7	Westbrook (9-11)	Samardzija (2-2)	Franklin (26)	38,057	80-75
156	September 27	Pirates 7:15 pm (FSM)	6 – 4	Reyes (3-1)	Gallagher (2-1)	McClellan (2)	38,592	81-75
157	September 28	Pirates 7:15 pm (FSM)	7 – 2	Burres (4-4)	Suppan (2-8)		38,315	81-76
158	September 29	Pirates 12:40 pm (FSM)	4 – 1	Walters (2-0)	McDonald (4-6)		38,112	82-76
159	September 30	Rockies 7:15 pm (FSM)	6 – 1	Carpenter (16-9)	Hammel (10-9)		36,739	83-76

OCTOBER (3-0)

#	Date	Opponent / Time	Score	Win	Loss	Save	Attendance	Record
160	October 1	Rockies 7:15 pm (FSM)	3 – 0	Westbrook (10-11)	de la Rosa (8-7)	Franklin (27)	36,293	84-76
161	October 2	Rockies 12:10 pm (FSM)	1 – 0 (11)	Motte (4-2)	Morales (0-4)		39,633	85-76
162	October 3	Rockies 1:15 pm (KSDK)	6 – 1	Suppan (3-8)	Rogers (2-3)		42,409	86-76

=== Record vs. opponents ===
2010 National League record Source: MLB Standings Grid – 2010
Team	AZ	ATL	CHC	CIN	COL	FLA	HOU	LAD	MIL	NYM	PHI	PIT	SD	SF	STL	WSH	AL
Arizona	–	3–4	1–6	2–5	9–9	3–3	4–3	5–13	3–4	5–1	2–4	2–4	8–10	5–13	4–5	3–4	6–9
Atlanta	4–3	–	4–2	3–2	2–4	11–7	5–1	5–3	5–2	11–7	8–10	6–3	4–2	4–3	2–6	8–10	9–6
Chicago	6–1	2–4	–	4–12	2–3	4–2	7–11	3–4	9–6	3–4	4–2	5–10	3–5	2–5	9–6	4–2	8–10
Cincinnati	5–2	2–3	12–4	–	2–5	5–2	10–5	5–4	11–3	4–2	2–5	10–6	2–4	3–4	6–12	4–3	8–7
Colorado	9–9	4–2	3–2	5–2	–	3–4	2–4	7–11	5–4	3–3	1–6	3–4	12–6	9–9	3–4	5–3	9–6
Florida	3–3	7–11	2–4	2–5	4–3	–	3–3	4–2	4–4	12–6	5–13	6–2	3–6	2–5	3–2	13–5	7–8
Houston	3–4	1–5	11–7	5–10	4–2	3–3	–	2–4	8–7	3–4	4–3	11–4	2–5	2–7	10–5	4–4	3–12
Los Angeles	13–5	3–5	4–3	4–5	11–7	2–4	4–2	–	4–2	3–4	2–4	4–3	8–10	8–10	3–4	3–3	4–11
Milwaukee	4–3	2–5	6–9	3–11	4–5	4–4	7–8	2–4	–	5–2	1–5	13–5	3–4	2–5	8–7	4–2	9–6
New York	1–5	7–11	4–3	2–4	3–3	6–12	4–3	4–3	2–5	–	9–9	6–1	3–3	3–4	3–3	9–9	13–5
Philadelphia	4–2	10–8	2–4	5–2	6–1	13–5	3–4	4–2	5–1	9–9	–	2–4	5–2	3–3	4–4	12–6	10–8
Pittsburgh	4–2	3–6	10–5	6–10	4–3	2–6	4–11	3–4	5–13	1–6	4–2	–	0–6	2–4	6–9	1–5	2–13
San Diego	10–8	2–4	5–3	4–2	6–12	6–3	5–2	10–8	4–3	3–3	2–5	6–0	–	12–6	3–4	3–3	9–6
San Francisco	13–5	3–4	5–2	4–3	9–9	5–2	7–2	10–8	5–2	4–3	3–3	4–2	6–12	–	3–3	4–2	7–8
St. Louis	5–4	6–2	6–9	12–6	4–3	2–3	5–10	4–3	7–8	3–3	4–4	9–6	4–3	3–3	–	3–3	9–6
Washington	4–3	10–8	2–4	3–4	3–5	5–13	4–4	3–3	2–4	9–9	6–12	5–1	3–3	2–4	3–3	–	5–13

=== Roster ===
2010 St. Louis Cardinals
Roster
Pitchers: 41 Mitchell Boggs; 29 Chris Carpenter; 31 Ryan Franklin; 54 Jaime García; 53 Blake Hawksworth; 26 Kyle Lohse; 63,48 Mike MacDougal; 62 Evan MacLane; 46 Kyle McClellan; 43 Trever Miller; 30 Jason Motte; 35,56 Adam Ottavino; 33 Brad Penny; 36 Dennys Reyes; 59 Fernando Salas; 37 Jeff Suppan; 50 Adam Wainwright; 62,40 P. J. Walters; 35 Jake Westbrook	Catchers: 16 Bryan Anderson; 60 Steve Hill; 21 Jason LaRue; 4 Yadier Molina; 19 Matt Pagnozzi; Infielders: 63 Daniel Descalso; 77 Pedro Feliz; 23 David Freese; 27 Tyler Greene; 64 Mark Hamilton; 3 Felipe López; 12 Aaron Miles; 5 Albert Pujols; 13 Brendan Ryan; 55 Skip Schumaker	Outfielders: 8 Allen Craig; 7 Matt Holliday; 15 Jon Jay; 47 Ryan Ludwick; 22 Joe Mather; 28 Colby Rasmus; 34 Nick Stavinoha; 44 Randy Winn	Manager: 10 Tony La Russa; Coaches: 18 Dave Duncan (pitching); 38 Marty Mason (bullpen); 25 Mark McGwire (hitting); 39 Dave McKay (first base); 11 José Oquendo (third base); 49 Joe Pettini (bench)

== Player stats ==
=== Batting ===
Note: G = Games played; AB = At bats; R = Runs; H = Hits; 2B= Doubles; HR = Home runs; RBI = Runs batted in; BB = Walks; Avg. = Batting average; OBP = On-base percentage; SLG = Slugging percentage

(through October 3)

Cardinals HITTING statistics
Sortable TEAM HITTING statistics

Player	G	AB	R	H	2B	HR	RBI	BB	SO	Avg.	OBP	SLG
Albert Pujols	159	587	**115**	183	39	**42**	**118**	103	76	.312 (.3118)	.414	.596
Matt Holliday	158	596	95	186	45	28	103	69	93	.312 (.3121)	.390	.532
Skip Schumaker	137	476	66	126	18	5	42	43	64	.265	.328	.338
Yadier Molina ( -9/21)	136	465	34	122	19	6	62	42	51	.262	.329	.342
Colby Rasmus	144	464	85	128	28	23	66	63	148	.276	.361	.498
Brendan Ryan	139	439	50	98	19	2	36	33	60	.223	.279	.294
Felipe López ( -9/18)	109	376	50	87	18	7	36	43	77	.231	.310	.340
Jon Jay	105	287	47	86	19	4	27	24	50	.300	.359	.422
Ryan Ludwick (4/5–7/30) ^	77	281	44	79	20	11	43	24	64	.281	.343	.484
David Freese (4/5–6/27) †	70	240	28	71	12	4	36	21	59	.296	.361	.404
Randy Winn	87	144	16	36	8	3	17	13	22	.250	.311	.382
Aaron Miles	79	139	14	39	5	0	9	6	14	.281	.311	.317
Nick Stavinoha	79	121	11	31	4	2	9	4	28	.256	.286	.339
Pedro Feliz (8/20- )	40	120	14	25	0	1	9	4	10	.208	.232	.250
Allen Craig	44	114	12	28	7	4	18	9	26	.246	.298	.412
Tyler Greene	44	104	14	23	3	2	10	13	24	.221	.328	.327
Adam Wainwright (P)	36	84	4	14	5	0	6	7	23	.167	.231	.226
Chris Carpenter (P)	34	72	2	8	0	1	4	1	25	.111	.135	.153
Joe Mather	36	60	7	13	4	0	3	2	11	.217	.242	.283
Jason LaRue	29	56	3	11	1	2	5	5	7	.196	.274	.321
Jaime García (P)	29	54	8	10	1	0	2	2	13	.185	.214	.204
Matt Pagnozzi	15	39	4	14	2	1	10	2	8	.359	.405	.487
Pitcher Totals	162	351	19	49	10	2	21	14	116	.140	.175	.185
**TEAM TOTALS**	**162**	**5,542**	**736**	**1,456**	**285**	**150**	**689**	**541**	**1,027**	**.263**	**.332**	**.402**

* Currently not on active roster
† on 15-day disabled or rehab list
^ Traded away from Cardinals

BOLD = Led NL

=== Starting pitchers ===
Note: GS = Games started; IP = Innings pitched; W = Wins; L = Losses; ERA = Earned run average; WHIP = (walks + hits) per inning pitched; HBP = Hit by pitch; BF = Batters faced; O-AVG = Opponent batting ave.; O-SLG = Opponent slugging ave.; R support avg = Average runs support from his team per game started

(through October 3)

Cardinals PITCHING statistics

Sortable TEAM PITCHING Statistics

Player	GS	IP	W	L	ERA	H	HR	BB	SO	WHIP	HBP	BF	O-AVG	O-SLG	R support avg
Chris Carpenter	**35**	235.0	16	9	3.22	214	21	63	179	1.18	13	969	.244	.377	4.7
Adam Wainwright ( – 9/24)	33	230.1	20	11	2.42	186	15	56	213	1.05	4	910	.224	.330	4.8
Jaime García ( – 9/13)	28	163.1	13	8	2.70	151	9	64	132	1.32	3	695	.243	.323	4.5
Kyle Lohse	18	92.0	4	8	6.55	129	10	35	54	1.78	3	431	.336	.516	5.7
Jake Westbrook (8/2 – )	12	75.0	4	4	3.48	70	5	24	55	1.25	2	317	.242	.339	3.8
Jeff Suppan	13	67.2	3	6	3.72	76	9	24	32	1.48	1	291	.291	.456	3.8
Brad Penny (†† 5/22)	9	55.2	3	4	3.23	63	4	9	35	1.29	3	232	.293	.414	2.8
Blake Hawksworth	8	41.2	3	4	5.83	54	6	21	28	1.80	0	192	.321	.482	4.5
Adam Ottavino	3	14.1	0	2	7.53	19	4	8	9	1.88	0	69	.317	.667	2.3
P. J. Walters	3	16.0	2	0	3.94	15	3	4	11	1.19	0	66	.246	.410	6.7
**STARTER TOTALS**	**162**	**991.0**	**68**	**56**	**3.50**	**977**	**86**	**308**	**748**	**1.30**	**29**	**4,172**	**.259**	**.386**	**4.5**
**TEAM TOTALS**	**162**	**1,453.2**	**86**	**76**	**3.57**	**1,412**	**133**	**477**	**1,094**	**1.30**	**48**	**6,137**	**.256**	**.387**	**641**; **R allowed**

* not on active roster
† on 15-day disabled list
†† on 60-day disabled list

Bold = leading NL

=== Relief pitchers ===
Note: IP = Innings pitched; ERA = Earned run average; WHIP = (walks + hits) per inning pitched

(through Oct. 3)

18–20, 3.73 ERA, 1.31 WHIP, 462.2 IP, 435 H, 201 R, 192 ER, 169 BB, 346 SO, 48 HR
Saves/Opp: 32/42 (76%) 1st Batter / Retired: 304/455 (67%)
Holds: 70 Inherited Runners/Scored: 65/204 (32%)

(through Oct. 3)
Games lost by bullpen: 20 Hawksworth (4), McClellan (4), Boggs (3), Motte (2), Franklin (2), Mather (1), Reyes (1), Miller (1), MacLane (1), MacDougal (1)

Blown Saves by bullpen: 19 Franklin (6), McClellan (4), Motte (4), Miller (2), Perez (1), Kinney (1), Salas (1)

== Scoring by inning ==
(through October 3)

INNING	1	2	3	4	5	6	7	8	9	10	11	12	13	19	20	TOTAL
CARDINALS	113	55	76	85	102	79	80	71	68	1	4	1	1	1	0	736
OPPONENTS	73	61	92	81	76	57	65	74	50	3	2	3	2	1	0	641

== Cardinals Record When ==
(through October 3)

Home 52–29 (.642)
Away 34–47 (.420)

Scoring first 64–21
Opp. scores first 22–55

Scoring more than 3 runs 77–20
Scoring 3 runs 3–10
Scoring fewer than 3 runs 6–46

Leading after 7 innings 72–3
Tied after 7 innings 10–7
Trailing after 7 innings 4–66

Leading after 8 innings 74–1
Tied after 8 innings 9–6
Trailing after 8 innings 3–69

Blown Saves by bullpen: 19
Games lost by bullpen: 20

In errorless games 51–39
Extra innings 6–8
Shutouts 16–13

One-run games 20–23

Out-hit opponents 64–19
Same hits as opponents 8–4
Out-hit by opponents 14–53

Runs via HR 248 (33.7% of total)
Opp. Runs via HR 204 (31.8% of total)

By Day

Mon. 14–5
Tue. 7–16
Wed. 11–14
Thu. 8–10
Fri. 20–6
Sat. 9–17
Sun. 17–8

By Opponent
DIVISION
HOME ROAD TOTAL

NL Central 19–20 20–19 39–39
NL East 12–3 6–12 18–15
NL West 15–3 5–13 20–16
AL East 0–0 2–1 2–1
AL Central 0–0 1–2 1–2
AL West 6–3 0–0 6–3

TOTALS 52–29 34–47 86–76
(Interleague 9–7)

== Busch Stadium (Indexes) ==
(through October 3, 86–76)

2010 (100 = Neutral Park, > 100 Ballpark favors, < 100 Ballpark inhibits)
81 HOME G; Cardinals: 2,686 AB; Opponents: 2,780 AB
81 AWAY G: Cardinals: 2,856 AB; Opponents: 2,726 AB

BA 98 R 94 HR 77 H 96 2B 95

(Cardinals batting: HOME .270 ROAD .256 OVERALL .263)
(Opponents batting: at StL .243 on ROAD .270 OVERALL .256)

2008–2010 Index (3-yr. composite)

HOME 243 G; Cardinals: 8,071 AB; Opponents: 8,417 AB

BA 98 R 93 H 97 2B 93 3B 89 HR 82 BB 104 SO 98 E 107 E-inf. 110 LHB-BA 98 LHB-HR 91 RHB-BA 98 RHB-HR 77

BA-Home .273 BA-Road .265 (.268 overall)
Opp.-Busch .253 Opp.-Road .270

== Farm system ==
Level	Team	League	Manager
AAA	Memphis Redbirds	Pacific Coast League	Chris Maloney
AA	Springfield Cardinals	Texas League	Ron Warner
A	Palm Beach Cardinals	Florida State League	Luis Aguayo
A	Quad Cities River Bandits	Midwest League	Johnny Rodríguez
A-Short Season	Batavia Muckdogs	New York–Penn League	Dann Bilardello
Rookie	Johnson City Cardinals	Appalachian League	Mike Shildt
Rookie	GCL Cardinals	Gulf Coast League	Steve Turco

LEAGUE CHAMPIONS: Johnson City

=== Major League Baseball draft selections ===
==== Complete draft list ====
- Overview: St. Louis Cardinals 2010 Draft Selections

==== Players from this draft who played in the major leagues ====
2010 St. Louis Cardinals draft picks who played in the major leagues

Name	Position	Round	MLB Debut Date	Team	Opponent	Ref
Dean Kiekhefer	LHP	36	May 14, 2016	St. Louis Cardinals	Los Angeles Dodgers	
