= Johnny Cueto =

Dominican baseball player (born 1986)

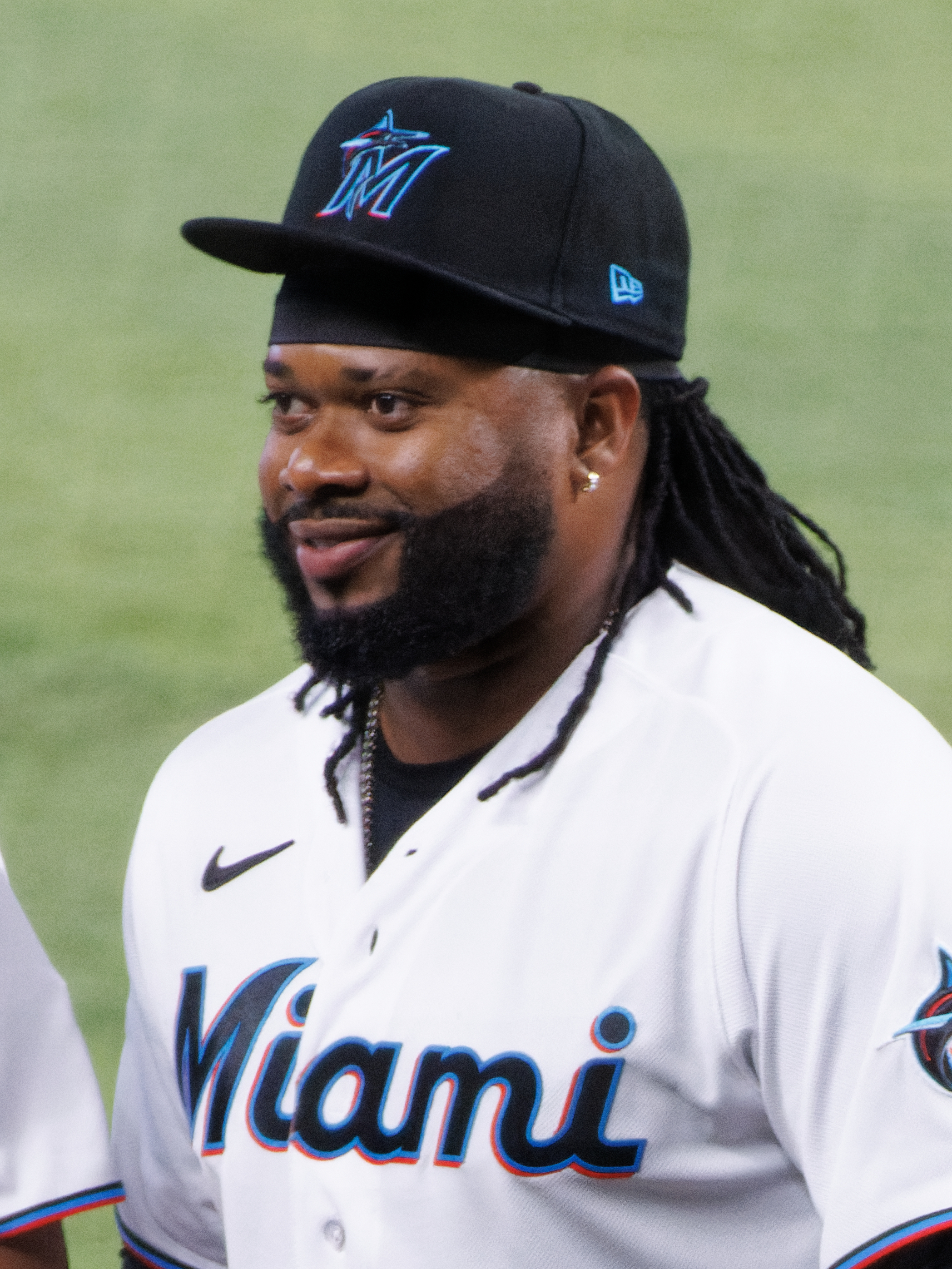
- Cueto with the Miami Marlins in 2023
- Pitcher
- Born: February 15, 1986 (age 40); San Pedro de Macorís, Dominican Republic
- Batted: Right Threw: Right

MLB debut
- April 3, 2008, for the Cincinnati Reds

Last MLB appearance
- August 27, 2024, for the Los Angeles Angels

MLB statistics
- Win–loss record: 144–113
- Earned run average: 3.52
- Strikeouts: 1,857
- Stats at Baseball Reference

Teams
- Cincinnati Reds (2008–2015); Kansas City Royals (2015); San Francisco Giants (2016–2021); Chicago White Sox (2022); Miami Marlins (2023); Los Angeles Angels (2024)

Career highlights and awards
- 2× All-Star (2014, 2016); World Series champion (2015); NL strikeout leader (2014)

Johnny Cueto Ortiz (Spanish: [ˈkweto]; born February 15, 1986) is a Dominican former professional baseball pitcher. He played in Major League Baseball (MLB) for the Cincinnati Reds, Kansas City Royals, San Francisco Giants, Chicago White Sox, Miami Marlins, and Los Angeles Angels, and most recently played for Leones del Escogido of the Dominican Professional Baseball League.

Cueto made his MLB debut in 2008. By 2011 he emerged as the ace of the Reds pitching staff and one of the top pitchers in the National League. He won 19 games and posted a 2.78 earned run average (ERA) in 2012, finishing fourth in the voting for the National League Cy Young Award and helping lead the Reds to the NL Central title. In 2014, he won 20 games with a 2.25 ERA and tied for the NL lead in strikeouts with 242, finishing as the runner-up for the Cy Young Award.

In 2015, Cueto won in his appearance in Game 2 of the World Series, pitching a 2-hit complete game for the Royals against the Mets, the first complete World Series game pitched in more than 20 years. It is his only appearance in a World Series to date.

In 2016, Cueto won 18 games with the Giants while posting a 2.79 ERA, helping lead them to the postseason, where they lost in the NLDS, and he achieved another top-10 finish in the Cy Young voting. He was an MLB All-Star in 2014 and 2016, and was chosen as the starting pitcher for the 2016 MLB All-Star Game. From 2011 to 2017, Cueto accumulated the second-lowest ERA of all pitchers with at least 750 innings pitched (behind Clayton Kershaw), managing a 2.94 ERA alongside a 90–51 (.638) record in 1,256 1/3 innings. He underwent Tommy John surgery in 2018.

== Early life ==
Johnny Cueto Ortiz was born on February 15, 1986, in San Pedro de Macorís, Dominican Republic.

== Professional career ==
=== Minor leagues ===
Cueto signed with the Reds in 2004 as an undrafted amateur free agent for a $35,000 signing bonus. He was in the minor leagues for three seasons, and excelled at many levels, but really turned heads during the 2007 season.

Cueto started his career for the Gulf Coast Reds of the Rookie Gulf Coast League, posting a 5.02 earned run average (ERA), before being promoted to the High-A Sarasota Reds of the Florida State League, where he finished his 2005 season.

In 2006, Cueto was assigned to the Low–A Dayton Dragons, and posted a 2.61 ERA, and a 0.88 walks plus hits per inning pitched (WHIP) ratio. While with Dayton, on May 13, 2006, he threw a rain-shortened no-hitter against Wisconsin. He was later promoted back to Sarasota, where he finished his season for the second consecutive year.

In 2007, Cueto was placed once again in Sarasota. He pitched 14 games for the team, before going on a hot streak and advancing through three levels in one season. He played for the Double–A Chattanooga Lookouts and Triple–A Louisville Bats throughout the rest of his 2007 campaign. He was named the Reds' Minor League Pitcher of the Year for the second consecutive season.

=== Cincinnati Reds (2008–2015) ===
==== 2008: Rookie season ====
Cueto made his MLB debut on April 3, 2008, for the Reds at home against the Arizona Diamondbacks, where he carried a perfect game through five innings before surrendering a home run to Justin Upton in the top of the sixth inning. The home run was the only baserunner he allowed, striking out 10 in seven innings. Cueto was credited with the win in his debut, as the Reds hung on to win 3–2. Cueto was the first Red since 1900 to throw ten strikeouts in his MLB debut. He was also the first MLB pitcher to have 10 strikeouts and 0 walks in his debut. He was the third in MLB history to have 10 strikeouts and give up only 1 hit. For the game, Cueto's ERA was 1.29 on 92 pitches. Despite his impressive debut, Cueto was inconsistent for the most part on the season. In his first two starts of the season, Cueto was 1–0 with a 2.02 ERA in 13 1/3 innings with 18 strikeouts, while he went 1–5 in 43 1/3 innings with a 6.65 ERA across his next eight. Cueto struck out several batters in his starts, but found himself unable to pitch himself deep into games rather frequently due to high pitch counts and giving up many home runs. At the end of the 2008 campaign, he finished with a 9–14 record with an ERA of 4.81 in 31 starts (14 quality starts). While he pitched only 174 innings, Cueto struck 158 batters (the most of all NL rookies), good for a K/9 ratio of 8.17, the eighth best in the National League.

==== 2009: Hot and cold ====
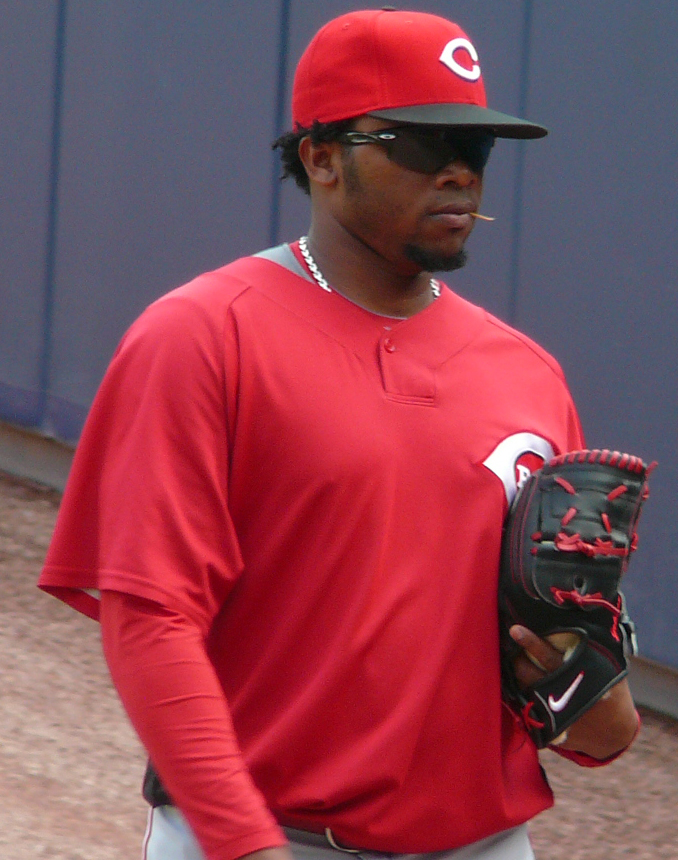
Cueto with the Cincinnati Reds in 2009

Cueto started 2009 as the Reds #4 starter. Cueto gave up four earned runs in six innings in his season debut in a 10–2 loss to the Pirates, despite striking out nine. Over his next three starts, however, Cueto posted a sub 1.00 ERA, allowing just two earned runs in 18 innings. Cueto pitched a career high eight shutout innings on May 3, allowing four hits and a walk while striking out in a 5–0 win over the Pirates. Between April 22 and May 29, Cueto had a nine start span where he pitched at least seven innings and allowed three earned runs or fewer in all but one of those starts. Cueto's ERA continued to be one of the strongest in the National League through the first three months of the season. On June 14, he took the lead for the lowest NL ERA, with a mark of 2.17 in 87 innings. His BB/9 lowered as the 2009 season progressed. Two weeks before the All-Star game, Cueto was 8–4 with a 2.69 ERA, a major improvement from the previous season. On July 6, 2009, Cueto suffered the worst defeat in his young career. Taking the mound against the Phillies, he allowed nine earned runs on five hits, walking three. To top it off, all this happened in the first inning, and Cueto was taken out of the game after only recording two outs. The Phillies scored 10 runs that inning. Cueto struggled following that defeat, turning in a 5.91 ERA over his final 13 starts while only managing a 3–6 record, although the final six starts (3–1 with a 3.63 ERA) were more promising. Cueto finished the season with a record of 11–11, and an ERA of 4.41 in 30 starts. In 171 1/3 innings, Cueto struck out 132 batters and walked 61 batters, which despite a lower BB/9 ratio (3.20 versus 3.52) resulted in a lower K/BB ratio than his rookie season (2.32 versus 2.16) due to a decrease in strikeouts per nine innings (6.93 versus 8.17).

==== 2010: Increasing consistency ====
Cueto started the 2010 season as the Reds' third starter. On May 11, Cueto pitched a one-hit shutout against the Pittsburgh Pirates. He struck out eight, walked none and hit one batter, leading the Reds to a 9–0 victory. In his 11 starts following his shutout before the All-Star break, Cueto went 6–1 with a 3.01 ERA, which included a streak of six consecutive decisions being wins, a new career high.

On August 12, Cueto was suspended seven games for what Major League Baseball described as his "violent and aggressive actions" in a bench-clearing brawl in the first inning of the Reds' August 10 game against the St. Louis Cardinals. While pinned to the backstop, Cueto began to kick wildly at various Cardinals, injuring Chris Carpenter and Jason LaRue. LaRue suffered a severe concussion in the brawl that ended his season, and was forced to retire after the season due to severe post-concussion syndrome.

Cueto finished the 2010 season with a 12–7 record and a 3.64 ERA in 31 starts, pitching 185 2/3 innings, striking out 138 batters, but giving up only 56 walks, 19 home runs and 181 hits. In Game 3 of the NLDS, he allowed two runs (one earned) in five innings of work and took the loss as Cole Hamels pitched a shutout. Following the 2010 season, the Reds and Cueto agreed to a four-year, $27 million contract.

==== 2011: Breakout year ====
Cueto began the season on the disabled list due to irritation in his right triceps suffered towards the end of spring training. He returned on May 8, pitching six scoreless innings against the Chicago Cubs. Because he missed several starts while on the disabled list, Cueto didn't become eligible for the ERA race until his start against the San Francisco Giants on July 31, where he pitched a three-hit, complete game shutout. He then took the Major League Baseball lead with a 1.72 ERA. He lost eligibility, twice, due to lack of innings since, but retook the National League lead in ERA after throwing seven innings of shutout ball against the Colorado Rockies on August 11. As the season progressed, Cueto began incorporating more and more of a turn to his windup. At the start of the season, his windup featured a conventional step, keeping his body pointed at third base before delivering to the plate. However, by late July, Cueto's torso was facing second base and he was pausing for a brief moment. Many people have compared this turn to Boston Red Sox great Luis Tiant's famous turn. As of August 25, he was tied with Jered Weaver for the best ERA in all of Major League Baseball at 2.03. On August 28, Cueto struck out a career-high 11 batters against the Washington Nationals, receiving a no-decision as he threw seven innings of two-run ball.

Cueto's bid for the ERA title and season came to an end after he strained a muscle in his back on September 15, while pitching vs the Cubs. On September 20, the team decided to shut down Cueto for the year without risking further injury. Cueto finished the season with a 9–5 record and a 2.31 ERA in 156 innings across 24 starts – six innings short of qualifying for the ERA title. Cueto struck out 104 batters, and gave up just 123 hits, 47 walks and eight home runs. He also pitched three complete games, one of which was a shutout.

==== 2012: Breaking the 200-inning plateau and Cy Young finalist ====
Cueto started on Opening Day for the Reds and went on to win 19 games against only 9 losses with a 2.78 ERA in 33 starts, giving up 205 hits and 15 home runs across 217 innings and striking out 170 batters, while walking just 49. Cueto established career bests in HR/9, BB/9, and K/BB ratios with 0.62, 2.03, and 3.47 respectively, while his 7.05 K/9 ratio was his best since his rookie year in 2008. It was the first time in his career he pitched 200 plus innings in a single season. Cueto also threw two complete games. In his first one, on May 4 against the Pirates, Cueto allowed just one run on seven hits, striking out four and giving up no walks. Cueto threw another complete game against the Cleveland Indians on June 12, giving up just one run on six hits, with seven strikeouts and no walks. During an eleven start stretch between May 30 and July 28, Cueto threw 81 1/3 innings without allowing a home run, a stretch in which he posted an 8–3 record with a 2.27 ERA. His streak came to an end on August 2, when Eddy Rodriguez hit a home run off Cueto in a game versus the Brewers. Cueto threw 23 quality starts, and ranked third in wins and ERA, fourth in complete games, fifth in innings pitched, eighth in hits allowed and ninth in winning percentage in the National League, while breaking his career bests in all of those categories. The Reds clinched the NL Central Division title for the second time in three years, and the second best record in baseball (97–65) behind the Washington Nationals.

Cueto started Game 1 of the National League Division Series against San Francisco, but left after only eight pitches because of a strained muscle in his back. After the Giants won Game 3, forcing a fourth game of the NLDS, the Reds replaced Cueto on the playoff roster with Mike Leake, who was their fifth starter during the season. Cueto finished fourth in the voting for the National League Cy Young Award, behind winner R. A. Dickey, Clayton Kershaw and Gio González.

==== 2013: Injury plagued season ====
Cueto suffered from a variety of injuries in 2013, including a lat strain, a shoulder strain and tightness in his lat, limiting him to only 11 starts on the season. In those 11 starts, Cueto had a record of 5–2 with a 2.82 ERA and 51 strikeouts over 60 2/3 innings, holding opponents to a .209 batting average. He gave up no more than three earned runs in ten of his 11 starts, and no more than one earned run in eight of them.

Despite his limited season, Cueto was chosen to start the 2013 NL Wild Card Game against the Pittsburgh Pirates. Cueto was met by a raucous, loud Pittsburgh crowd who had not seen a playoff game in 20 years. The Pirates fans chanted Cueto's name loudly the entire game, attempting to rattle him. After already giving up a second-inning home run to Pirates outfielder Marlon Byrd, Cueto, who was having his name mockingly chanted by over 40,000 people, dropped the ball off the mound, much to the delight of the Pittsburgh crowd. On the next pitch he threw, Cueto gave up another home run to Pirates catcher Russell Martin, giving Pittsburgh an early 2–0 lead. Cueto allowed two more runs, and was pulled after 3 1/3 innings, having already given up four earned runs on eight hits. The Reds would show little resistance the rest of the way, and the Pirates won the game 6–2, advancing to an NLDS series with other division rival the St. Louis Cardinals. Cueto took the loss in the game, which ended the season for both Cueto and the Reds.

==== 2014: First All-Star selection and Cy Young runner up ====
After a disappointing finish to an injury-riddled 2013 season, Cueto not only opened the season in excellent fashion, but produced one of the most dominant performances by a starter in years. In his first nine starts of the season, he pitched at least seven innings, giving up no more than two earned runs and five hits per outing. Making his third consecutive opening day start, Cueto permitted just one run on three hits in seven innings, striking out eight batters. Despite allowing only five earned runs and 13 hits in his first three starts (21 innings) Cueto had accumulated two losses and a no decision due to poor run support from his offense. On April 16, Cueto threw a complete game, three-hit shutout versus the Pittsburgh Pirates, striking out a career-high 12 batters without issuing a single walk. It was the seventh career complete game and third career shutout for Cueto and his first complete game in nearly two years. Cueto threw another complete game versus his Pirates in his next start on April 22, in which he had a shutout going until he gave up a home run to Andrew McCutchen in the ninth with one out. He settled down to just allow the one run and another two hits, both of them singles, striking out four and walking three while throwing 117 pitches and out-dueling former Reds teammate Edinson Volquez. It was the first time in his career Cueto had thrown complete games in back-to-back starts. Cueto followed this up by throwing another shutout versus the Padres (his third complete game of the season) on May 15, striking out eight batters and allowing three singles and two walks, lowering his ERA to 1.25. In his first fifteen starts of the season, despite compiling only a 6–5 win–loss record, Cueto had a 1.92 ERA across 108 innings, with 111 strikeouts against only 26 walks, good for a WHIP of 0.83, while limiting opponents to a .169 batting average.

In July Cueto was selected to his first All-Star Game. At the time, Cueto was second in the NL in ERA (2.13) and strikeouts (141) and first in innings pitched (143 2/3) and opponents batting average (.181). Cueto was named National League Player of the Week for August 4–10 after recording a 2–0 record with a 2.12 ERA, and 15 strikeouts in 17.0 innings pitched. After his first twenty-five starts, Cueto had a 14–6 record with a 2.05 ERA, having already established career highs in strikeouts, complete games and shutouts.

On September 28, 2014, Cueto recorded his 20th win of the 2014 season, becoming the first Cincinnati Reds player to achieve 20 or more victories in a season since Danny Jackson achieved the feat in 1988. The final score of the game, against the Pittsburgh Pirates, was 4–1. Cueto pitched a total of eight innings of one-run ball and was allowed to bat in the 8th inning instead of a pinch hitter, with the game tied 1–1 and a runner on third base. Cueto hit a go-ahead single and Aroldis Chapman picked up the save for the game in the 9th.

Cueto finished the 2014 season with a 20–9 record and a 2.25 ERA in 34 starts (29 quality starts), giving up only 169 hits and 22 home runs across 243 2/3 innings pitched, recording 242 strikeouts (tied for the most in the NL with Stephen Strasburg) against just 65 walks, an opponent batting average of .194, an opponent on-base percentage of .261, an opponent slugging percentage of .313, an opponent on-base plus slugging of .584, and an 0.96 WHIP. He also pitched four complete games (two shutouts), never pitched less than five innings in any outing, pitched six or more innings in 29 of his 34 starts, seven or more innings in 23 starts, and eight or more innings in 15 starts. Cueto gave up 2 earned runs or fewer in 27 starts, gave up 7 hits or fewer in all but one of his starts, struck out 8.94 batters per nine innings (the ninth best K/9 ratio in the National League), and gave up fewer hits per nine innings than any other starting pitcher in the majors (6.24 H/9). On November 12, 2014, Cueto finished second in the National League Cy Young Award voting to Clayton Kershaw. He also received the Wilson Defensive Player of the Year Award for his defensive excellence.

==== 2015: Final season in Cincinnati ====
On April 6, Cueto recorded the 1,000th strikeout of his career in a 5–2 win over the Pittsburgh Pirates. Cueto finished his fourth consecutive Opening Day start allowing just five baserunners (four hits and one walk) across seven scoreless innings with 10 strikeouts, a personal Opening Day high. He pitched at least seven innings in eight of his nine first starts, continuing his trend of pitching deep into games as established during the 2011 season. Cueto struggled with inflammation in his elbow in May, but only missed a pair of starts and continued to assert himself as one of the top pitchers in baseball. At the end of June, Cueto had a 2.98 ERA, a .204 opponent batting average and a 0.94 WHIP while limiting opponents to a .204 batting average. Cueto was a candidate for the Final Vote on the NL All-Star ballot, but lost to Carlos Martinez. On July 7, Cueto had his best outing of the year against the Nationals, throwing a complete game two-hit shutout, striking out 11 batters and walking only one. Despite Cueto's success, the Reds' continued to plummet in the NL Central, and ultimately chose to trade Cueto to the Royals days before the Trade Deadline. In 19 starts with the Reds, Cueto went 7–6 with a 2.62 ERA, striking out 120 batters across 130 2/3 innings (good for a K/9 ratio of 8.27), limiting opponents to a .196 batting average, and posting a WHIP of 0.93.

=== Kansas City Royals (2015) ===
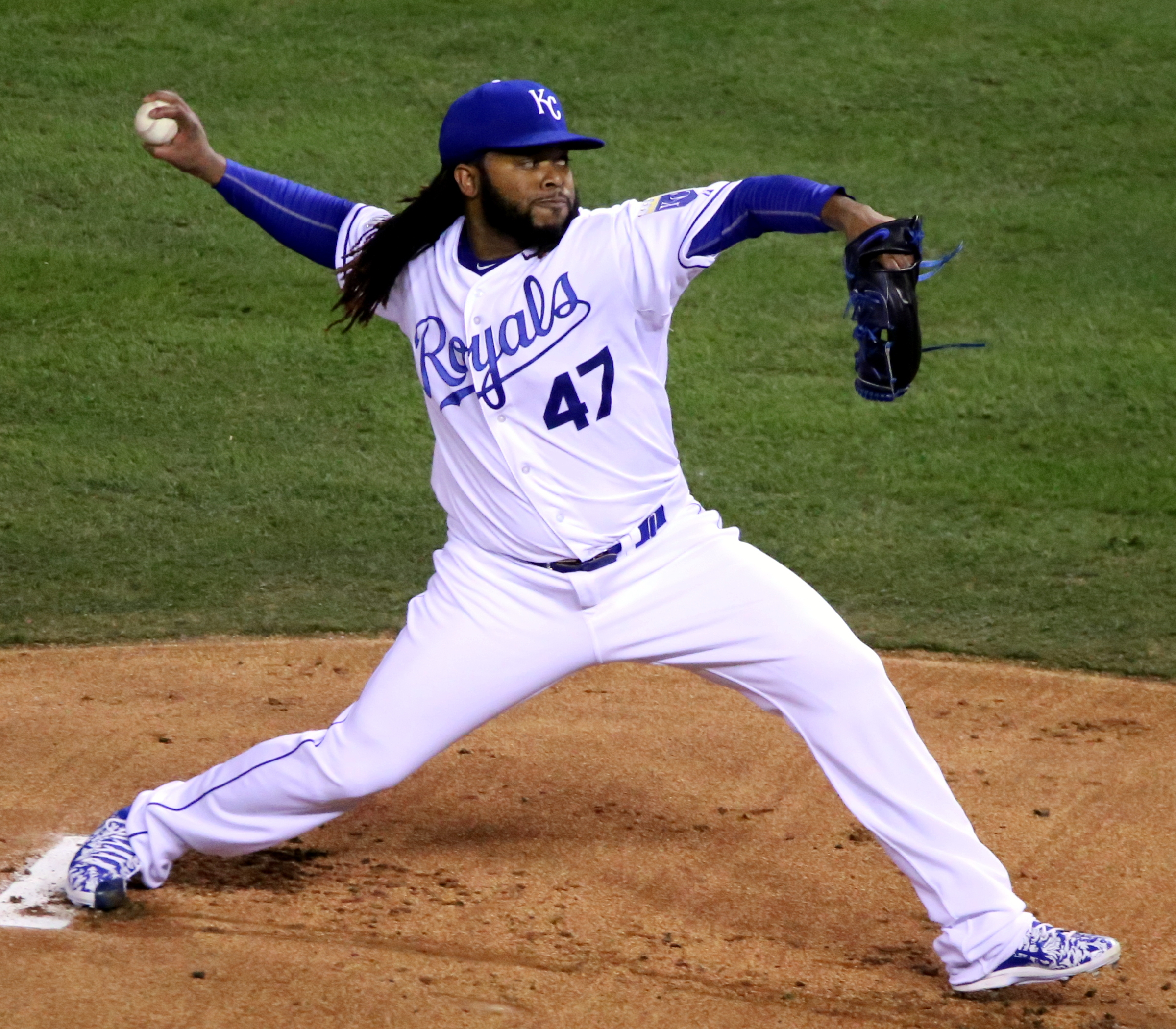
Cueto pitching in 2015 World Series

On July 26, 2015, Cueto was traded to the Kansas City Royals in exchange for Brandon Finnegan and minor leaguers John Lamb and Cody Reed.

In his home debut with the Royals, Cueto threw a 4-hit complete game shutout against the Detroit Tigers, striking out eight batters without issuing a walk. This gave him his first win in a Royals uniform.

After a promising start, Cueto struggled down the stretch, posting a 4–7 record and a 4.76 ERA in 13 starts after joining the Royals. After a mediocre performance in game 2 of the American League Division Series against the Houston Astros, Cueto returned to form in Game 5, pitching eight dominant innings, striking out eight and retiring his final 19 batters. The only hits he allowed came on back-to-back pitches: an infield single by Evan Gattis and a home run by Luis Valbuena. The Royals went on to win 7–2, eliminating the Astros and securing a spot in the ALCS for the second straight season. In the ALCS against the Toronto Blue Jays, Cueto took the loss in game 3 after giving up eight earned runs in two innings as the Royals' series lead shrunk from two games to one.

Cueto started in game two of the World Series, delivering by far the best postseason performance in his entire career up to that point. Cueto was dominant from start to finish, pitching a complete game and only gave up two hits and one run (while striking out four) to give the Royals a 7–1 victory over the New York Mets and a 2–0 series lead. Only Lucas Duda recorded a hit (with 2), becoming the difference maker between Cueto and a no-hitter. Cueto became the first AL pitcher to throw a complete game in the World Series since Minnesota's Jack Morris in 1991. Cueto was the last pitcher to throw a complete game in the World Series until Yoshinobu Yamamoto of the Los Angeles Dodgers did so in Game 3 of the 2025 World Series, and as of 2025, he remains the most recent American League pitcher to do so. The Royals went on to win the World Series in 5 games to give Cueto his first championship ring.

In 32 starts between the Reds and Royals, Cueto went 11–13 with a 3.44 ERA, striking out 176 batters across 212 innings, allowing just 194 hits and 46 walks, while pitching two complete game shutouts. He set career highs in BB/9 (1.95) and K/BB (3.83) ratios alongside a K/9 ratio of 7.47, despite failing to post a sub-3.00 ERA for the first time since 2010. Following the World Series, Cueto became a free agent for the first time in his career.

=== San Francisco Giants (2016–2021) ===
==== 2016: All-Star starting pitcher and Giants co-ace ====
On December 16, 2015, Cueto signed a six-year, $130 million contract with the San Francisco Giants (an annual amount of $21.7 million) with a club option for 2022 worth $22 million with a $5 million buyout. Cueto's contract includes a $500,000 bonus if he is traded to another team, as well as the option to opt out of the contract after two years with a guaranteed $5 million pay for the buyout.

Cueto made his Giants debut on April 5 against the Milwaukee Brewers, earning the win after pitching seven innings, limiting the Brewers to an earned run on six hits while striking out four. In his home debut at AT&T Park on April 10, despite allowing five earned runs in the first inning against the Los Angeles Dodgers, Cueto allowed just one more earned run in seven innings, striking out eight while walking only two. On April 26 at AT&T Park, in a 1–0 complete game shutout over the San Diego Padres, his first with the Giants and the seventh of his career (13th complete game), Cueto won his 100th career game on 119 pitches. He became the twelfth Dominican-born pitcher in Major League history to win 100 games. Cueto struck out 11 batters, giving up seven hits while issuing one walk. Cueto threw his second complete game of the season, against the Padres at Petco Park on May 18, giving up just one run on four hits, striking out eight batters and walking just two. On May 23, Cueto pitched another 1–0 complete game shutout, the 15th complete game and eighth shutout of his career, at home against the Padres, giving up just two hits and striking out six without issuing a walk. Cueto was named National League Player of the Week for the second time in his career for May 23–29, going 2–0 with a 0.60 ERA (one earned run in 15 innings pitched), giving up eight hits, walking two and striking out 11. Cueto earned his tenth win of the season on June 15 against the Brewers, allowing one run in seven innings while striking out nine, lowering his ERA to 2.10 (1.04 ERA in his last eight starts combined). Cueto became only the fourth Giants pitcher since 1958 to win 10 of his first eleven decisions on a season and the first since Tim Lincecum in 2008 (Gaylord Perry and Juan Marichal both did it in 1966).

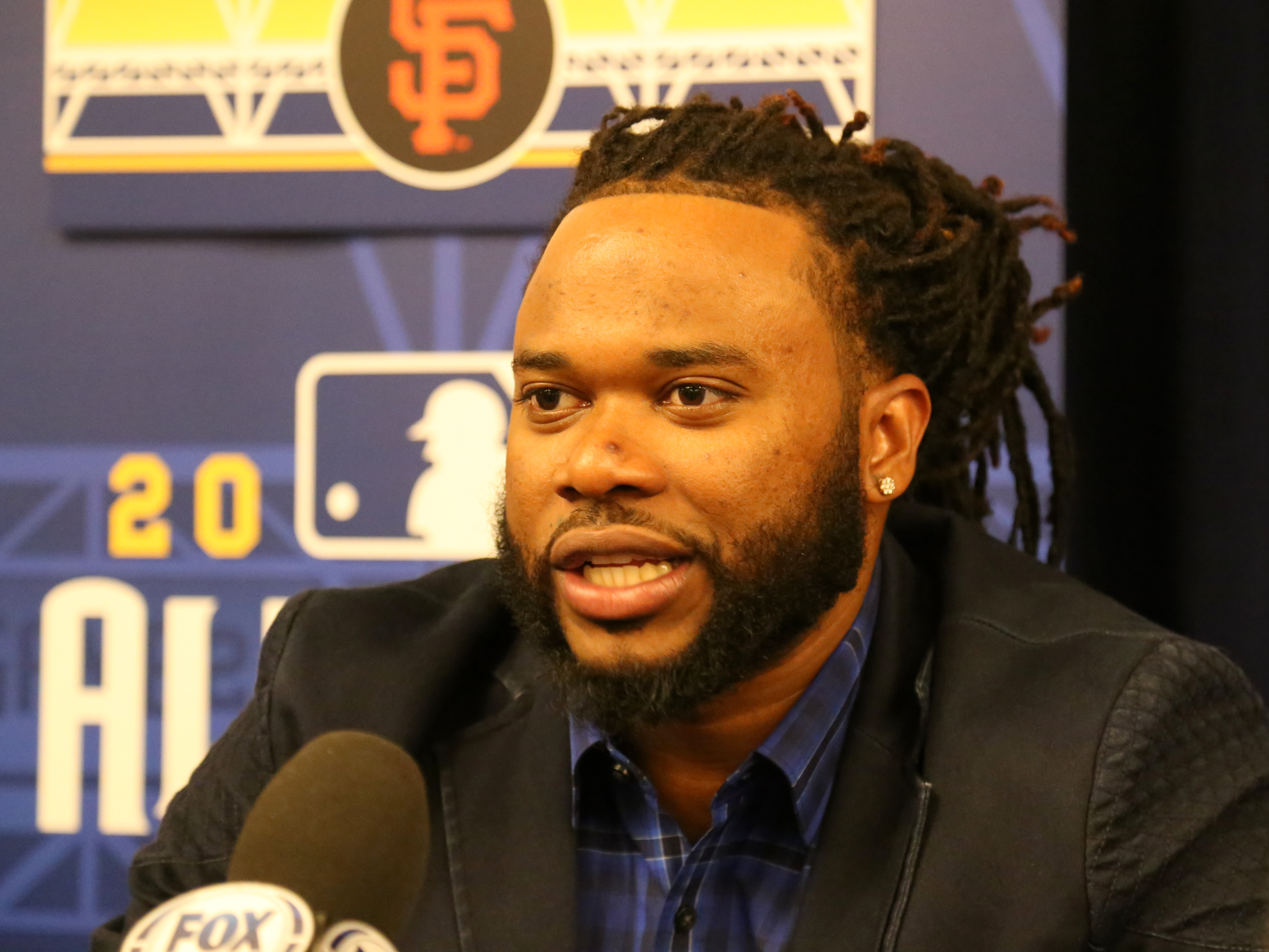
Cueto at an All-Star press event in 2016

On July 6, Cueto was selected to his second All-Star game. At the time, Cueto had 12 wins against just one loss, having won nine straight decisions, compiling a 2.57 ERA across 122 1/3 innings, and notching 107 strikeouts against just 23 walks and 102 hits, while giving up only six home runs. In his final start before the All-Star break, Cueto threw another complete game, his fourth of the season, at home against the Colorado Rockies. He allowed just one run on five hits, walking only one batter and striking out eight, retiring 17 of the final 18 batters he faced, his Major-League leading 13th win on the season. Manager Terry Collins chose Cueto to start the 2016 Major League Baseball All-Star Game for the National League, making him the first Giants pitcher to start the All-Star game since Matt Cain in 2012. He started with his battery mate, Buster Posey who was the starting catcher for the National League, and received the loss, as the NL lost 4–2.

Cueto posted an 0–2 record with a 4.84 ERA in his first six starts following the All-Star break, during which opposing hitters batted .284 against him and hit six home runs, as many as he had given up before the All-Star break. Cueto won his first game since the All-Star break on August 19 against the Mets, pitching seven innings of one run ball to improve his record to 14–3. Across his final seven starts of the season following his first post All-Star win, Cueto went 4–2 with a 2.35 ERA in 46 innings, averaging a strikeout an inning and holding opposing batters to a .228 batting average. In September, he pitched to a 4–0 record and a 1.78 ERA in 35 1/3 innings, his lowest ERA in any month since tallying a 1.15 ERA in April 2014 with the Reds. Cueto threw another complete game, his fifth of the year (a new career high), against the St. Louis Cardinals on September 15, giving up two runs on five hits, walking one batter while striking out seven batters, during which he surpassed 200 innings pitched for the fourth time in his career (and in the last five seasons). On September 20, during a start against the Los Angeles Dodgers, Cueto exited the game after 5 1/3 scoreless innings due to a groin strain (he received the victory, allowing just eight hits and striking out six), causing him to miss his next start. Cueto finished the year on a high note on September 29 against the Colorado Rockies, in his final start of the regular season, pitching seven strong innings in which he gave up just two earned runs on nine hits and struck out 11 batters, as the Giants won the game 7–2.

Led by the strength of the pitching trio of Cueto, Madison Bumgarner and Jeff Samardzija (who combined to go 45–25 with a 3.09 ERA in 649 2/3 innings with 616 strikeouts (for a K/9 rate of 8.53) across 98 starts), the Giants clinched a Wild Card berth, and defeated the New York Mets and advanced to the National League Division Series against the Chicago Cubs. In Game 1 of the NLDS, in the midst of a duel with Cubs pitcher Jon Lester, after throwing 7 1/3 scoreless innings, Cueto gave up a home run in the eighth inning to Javier Baez as San Francisco lost 1–0 to the Cubs (Cueto received the loss having pitched a complete game, striking out ten batters over eight innings while allowing just the one run on three hits without walking a batter). The Cubs would go on to win the series 3–1, eliminating the Giants from the postseason.

Cueto finished his first regular season with the Giants with an 18–5 record and a 2.79 ERA in 219 2/3 innings across 32 starts, tallying a total of 198 strikeouts against 45 walks while giving up 195 hits and 15 home runs. Cueto ranked among the league and baseball leaders in all major categories. He was third in the NL in wins (18), fifth in ERA (2.79), second in win percentage (.783%), third in innings pitched (219 2/3), eighth in games started (32), first in complete games (5), second in shutouts (2), fifth in hits allowed (195), eleventh in hit batters (11), fourteenth in batting average against (.238), fourteenth in H/9 allowed (7.99), second in HR/9 allowed (0.61), eighth in WHIP (1.09), eighth in opponent OBP (.284), seventh in opponent SLG (.350), seventh in opponent OPS (.637), sixth in strikeouts (198), twelfth in K/9 ratio (8.11), third in BB/9 allowed (1.84), fifth in K/BB ratio (4.40), third in FIP (2.96), sixth in Adjusted ERA+ (147), first in win probability added (5.0), third in batters faced (881), fourth in quality starts (22), fourth in number of pitches thrown (3299) and second in number of batters picked off (5). Cueto was one of only six pitchers in the National League to pitch at least 200 innings during the 2016 season, and pitched more innings per game than any other qualified pitcher in the National League, averaging approximately 6.865 innings pitched per start. His statistics for complete games, HR/9, BB/9, FIP and K/BB were all career highs. Cueto finished in sixth place in the voting for the National League Cy Young Award, behind Kershaw, Bumgarner, Kyle Hendricks, Jon Lester and Max Scherzer. He received three third-place votes, three fourth-place votes and four fifth-place votes.

==== 2017: Injuries and inconsistency ====
Cueto began his second season in San Francisco as the Giants #2 starter once again right behind fellow co-ace Bumgarner. On April 4, Cueto made his season debut versus the Diamondbacks at Chase Field. Despite giving up four earned runs on two walks and six hits (two home runs) across five innings, he was able to come away with the win in his season debut. In his outing he notched five strikeouts and helped tremendously with the Giants offense, contributing a single, an RBI and reaching base twice in the Giants 8–4 win. After pitching seven innings of two-run ball against the Rockies on April 14, Cueto became the first Giants pitcher to win his first three starts of the season in back to back years since Rick Reuschel did so in 1988 and 1989.. After revealing he had been suffering a blister on the middle finger of his pitching hand since the culmination of spring training, Cueto struck out 10 batters and allowed just two earned runs in seven innings in his second start at Great American Ballpark since leaving the Reds, his fourteenth (fifteenth counting the postseason) double digit strikeout game, and he established the record for the most double digit strikeout games by a pitcher at the stadium (eight). Cueto returned to form on May 28 against the Atlanta Braves, allowing one earned run in six strong innings striking out eight batters, while tacking on a RBI sac fly and a sac bunt at the plate. Cueto then went winless in his next five starts, before posting his sixth victory of the season after allowing two runs in five innings against the Pirates on June 30. He was placed on the DL on July 15 following his first start after the All-Star Break with blisters on his right hand, while later suffering a slight forearm injury in his rehab assignment. At the time he was placed on the DL Cueto was 6–7 with a 4.59 ERA in 115 2/3 innings (he had struck out 103), his worst ERA in a single season by that point since he was a rookie in 2008. On September 25 at Chase Field, in a 9–2 win over the Arizona Diamondbacks, Cueto struck out pinch hitting second baseman Ildemaro Vargas swinging to start the bottom of the fifth inning for his 1,500th career strikeout. Cueto finished the season 8–8 with a 4.52 ERA and 1.45 WHIP in 147 1/3 innings (25 starts), striking out 136 batters as the Giants slumped to the worst record in baseball, finishing the season an abysmal 34 games under .500 (64–98).

==== 2018: Tommy John surgery ====
In his season debut on March 30 against the Dodgers, Cueto carried a perfect game through six innings before giving up a single to Chris Taylor to lead off the seventh inning. Cueto finished his outing facing the minimum of 21 batters through seven scoreless innings, giving up the one hit while striking out four and walking none as he received a no-decision in a 1–0 Giants victory. Through his first four starts, Cueto led the major leagues with a 0.35 ERA, giving up just one earned run in 26 innings. On May 7, Cueto was diagnosed with a right elbow sprain. Though he was ruled out for 6–8 weeks, he did not require Tommy John surgery, much to the delight of Giants manager Bruce Bochy. However, on July 30, Cueto went back on the disabled list due to an aggravated right elbow sprain. On August 1, it was announced he would undergo Tommy John surgery, ending his season. He finished the season with 9 starts and an ERA of 3.23 in 53 innings.

==== 2019: Return from surgery ====
Cueto did a stint in the minor leagues following his Tommy John rehab, going 0–2 with a 3.38 ERA in 21 1/3 innings over six starts. He returned to the Giants on September 10, opening against the Pirates and pitching five shutout innings where he allowed only a single hit and one walk. Cueto finished his 2019 season with the Giants garnering a 5.06 ERA through 16 innings over the course of four starts.

==== 2020: Shortened season ====
In 2020, Cueto started 12 games for the Giants and went 2–3 with a 5.40 ERA, along with 56 strikeouts and 26 walks in 63 1/3 innings during the pandemic-shortened 60-game season.

==== 2021 ====
In the 2021 regular season, Cueto was 7–7 with a 4.08 ERA in 22 games (21 starts) covering 114 2/3 innings.

=== Chicago White Sox (2022) ===
On April 4, 2022, Cueto signed a minor league contract with the Chicago White Sox. The White Sox promoted Cueto to the major leagues on May 16. On that same day he made his White Sox debut in a start against the Royals. Cueto turned out to be a valuable addition to the White Sox in 2022. Across 25 games, he posted a 3.35 ERA and 1.225 WHIP in 158 1/3 innings pitched.

=== Miami Marlins (2023) ===
On January 19, 2023, Cueto signed a one-year contract with the Miami Marlins with a club option for the 2024 season. Cueto exited his Marlins debut with a biceps injury and was placed on the injured list. He began a rehab assignment with the Triple-A Jacksonville Jumbo Shrimp, but suffered a sprained left ankle after falling awkwardly. He was transferred to the 60-day injured list on May 23. He was activated on July 10. In 13 games (10 starts), he struggled to a 6.02 ERA with 39 strikeouts across 52 1/3 innings of work. Cueto became a free agent following the season.

=== Texas Rangers ===
On April 23, 2024, Cueto signed a minor league contract with the Texas Rangers. On June 4, Cueto agreed to push back the opt–out date in his contract. In 8 games for the Triple–A Round Rock Express, he compiled a 5.92 ERA with 30 strikeouts in 38 innings. On July 2, he exercised the opt–out clause in his contract and became a free agent.

=== Los Angeles Angels (2024) ===
On July 20, 2024, Cueto signed a minor league contract with the Los Angeles Angels. In 2 starts for the Angels, he allowed 9 runs on 14 hits with 6 strikeouts in 11 1/3 innings. Cueto was designated for assignment by Los Angeles on August 30. He elected free agency on September 2.

=== Leones del Escogido (2024-2026) ===
On December 13, 2024, Cueto signed a contract with Leones del Escogido of the Dominican Professional Baseball League. Cueto finished the regular season with an ERA of 1.20 over 30.0 innings pitched, and pitched 6 scoreless innings in game three of the LIDOM Final.

On October 1, 2025, Cueto said that he was preparing physically to play with the Leones again during the 2025-2026 season. Cueto started in four games for Leones during the season, with 14.0 innings pitched and a 9.00 ERA.

== Background and influences ==
Cueto's road to the major leagues was a trying one because many teams were wary of his small stature. "Some told me I was too short, others thought I was in fact older than the age that appeared in my papers", said the right-handed fireballer. He is listed at 5 feet 11 inches (1.80 m), but some believe he is closer to 5 feet 8 inches (1.73 m). However, rather than give in to the criticism, Cueto looked to another undersized Dominican pitcher, Pedro Martínez, for inspiration. "Pedro has been my inspiration, the person for whom I decided to stop playing outfield to become a pitcher," Cueto said. "One of my biggest dreams is to be able to meet Pedro in person, shake his hand and tell him that he has been my hero and my role model."

== Pitching style ==
Cueto throws a variety of pitches, although his main ones are a four-seam fastball (91–97 mph), a two-seam fastball (89–94 mph), and a slider (81–88 mph), which he supplements with a cutter (87–92 mph), a changeup (82–86 mph), and a curveball (78–83 mph). Cueto only throws his changeup to left-handed hitters, and he rarely uses his curveball. He often likes to use his slider with two strikes. Cueto's distinctive wind-up, which on some pitches begins by spinning back towards second base so that his back faces the batter, has been compared to that of Luis Tiant and Hideo Nomo. Throughout most of his career, Cueto has used his pitches from four different windups: the traditional windup, the "Tiant", the quick pitch, and the "rocking chair". Cueto's unorthodox delivery where he would turn towards second base then shimmy before the ball was thrown led Detroit Tigers manager Brad Ausmus to question its legality during and after Cueto's shutout of the Tigers in August 2015. Ausmus argued to umpire Joe West during the game and to reporters after the game that Cueto sometimes stops in his wind-up, thereby making those pitches illegal.

== World Baseball Classic ==
Cueto was a member of the Dominican Republic national baseball team in the 2009 World Baseball Classic. In his only start, an elimination game against Panama, Cueto earned the win after throwing 4 2/3 scoreless innings, striking out five against one walk and three hits, the only member of his team to earn a win in the tournament following their elimination in their next game. He missed the tournament in 2013 due to injury. Cueto was scheduled to represent the Dominican Republic once again in the 2017 World Baseball Classic, but was unable to attend the opening rounds due to his father falling ill (the Dominican Republic was eliminated in the second round), thus Cueto missed the tournament again.

== Personal life ==
Cueto has two sons and one daughter.

== See also ==
- List of baseball players who underwent Tommy John surgery
