= Steven Hill (baseball) =

American baseball player (born 1985)

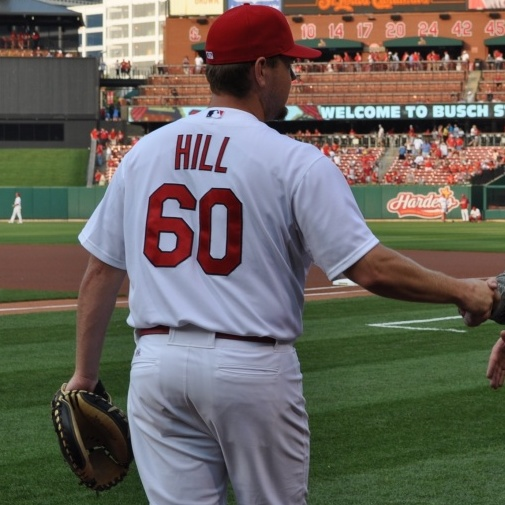
- Hill at Busch Stadium in 2012
- Catcher / First baseman
- Born: March 14, 1985 (age 41); Houston, Texas, U.S.
- Batted: Right Threw: Right

MLB debut
- August 15, 2010, for the St. Louis Cardinals

Last MLB appearance
- September 16, 2012, for the St. Louis Cardinals

MLB statistics
- Batting average: .231
- Home runs: 1
- Runs batted in: 1
- Stats at Baseball Reference

Teams
- St. Louis Cardinals (2010, 2012)

Steven Douglas Hill (born March 14, 1985) is an American former professional baseball catcher and first baseman. He played in Major League Baseball (MLB) for the St. Louis Cardinals.

== Career ==
Hill played college baseball for Stephen F. Austin University, Eastfield College, Mt. San Jacinto College, and San Jacinto College-North before being selected by the Cardinals in the 13th Round (412th overall) of the 2007 amateur entry draft. Hill played for the Double–A Springfield Cardinals before bypassing the Cardinals Triple–A Memphis Redbirds farm team when he was called up to the major league Cardinals on August 11, 2010. He made his debut on August 15 at Busch Stadium and hit a home run for his first major league hit. He was recalled on September 24 after Yadier Molina was shut down for the season. On November 19, Hill was removed from the 40–man roster and sent outright to Memphis.

Hill's contract at Triple–A Memphis was purchased by the St. Louis Cardinals and he was recalled on May 23, 2012. He had two different stints with St. Louis during the season, but saw limited playing time with only ten at–bats, going 2–for–10. He played in 87 minor league games for Memphis batting .266 with 17 home runs and 52 RBI. On November 1, 2012 Hill, along with two other players was outrighted back to Memphis as St. Louis cleared space on their 40-man roster for possible trades and acquisitions.

On December 6, 2012, Hill was selected by the Oakland Athletics in the minor league phase of the Rule 5 draft. Hill announced his retirement from professional baseball on April 2, 2013.
