= Evan MacLane =

American baseball player (born 1982)

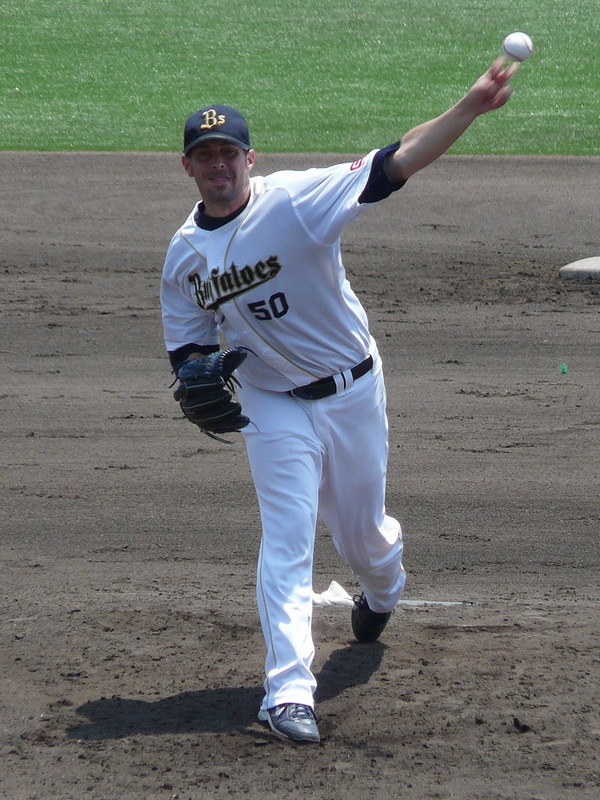
- MacLane with the Orix Buffaloes
- Pitcher
- Born: November 4, 1982 (age 43); Chico, California, U.S.
- Batted: Left Threw: Left

Professional debut
- MLB: July 7, 2010, for the St. Louis Cardinals
- NPB: June 11, 2011, for the Orix Buffaloes
- CPBL: March 24, 2015, for the EDA Rhinos

Last appearance
- MLB: July 18, 2010, for the St. Louis Cardinals
- NPB: August 30, 2012, for the Orix Buffaloes
- CPBL: May 14, 2015, for the EDA Rhinos

MLB statistics
- Win–loss record: 0–1
- Earned run average: 9.00
- Strikeouts: 0

NPB statistics
- Win–loss record: 8–7
- Earned run average: 4.09
- Strikeouts: 50

CPBL statistics
- Win–loss record: 3–2
- Earned run average: 4.83
- Strikeouts: 45
- Stats at Baseball Reference

Teams
- St. Louis Cardinals (2010); Orix Buffaloes (2011–2012); EDA Rhinos (2015)

Evan Alan MacLane (born November 4, 1982) is an American former professional baseball pitcher. He played in Major League Baseball (MLB) for the St. Louis Cardinals and in Nippon Professional Baseball (NPB) for the Orix Buffaloes.

== Career ==
MacLane attended Pleasant Valley High School in Chico and went on to Feather River College.

MacLane was taken as the 739th pick (25th round) of the 2003 Major League Baseball draft by the New York Mets. MacLane signed with the Mets and played in their minor-league system until 2006, rising to the Triple-A level.

In 2006, MacLane was traded from the Mets to the Arizona Diamondbacks for Shawn Green. He pitched in the Diamondbacks system until 2009, all in Triple-A. In 2009, he signed with the St. Louis Cardinals as a minor league free agent, and joined the Cardinals' Triple-A franchise, the Memphis Redbirds.

On May 29, 2010, MacLane was promoted to the big leagues with the St. Louis Cardinals and assigned to the bullpen. He was returned to Memphis two days later, without appearing in a major league game.

MacLane was called back up on June 7, 2010. On July 7, 2010, he made his major league debut and allowed a ninth-inning walk-off home run to Chris Iannetta at Coors Field.

On January 2, 2011, he signed with the Orix Buffaloes in Japan. In 2 seasons with Orix, MacLane went 8-7 with a 4.09 ERA over 25 appearances (20 starts), striking out 50 in 99 innings.

MacLane has pitched ten seasons in the Dominican Professional Baseball League, where he continued to be one of this winter league's more effective starters in 2017-2018.

On June 13, 2018, MacLane signed with the Tecolotes de los Dos Laredos of the Mexican League. He was released on July 18, 2018.
