= Blake Hawksworth =

Canadian baseball player (born 1983)

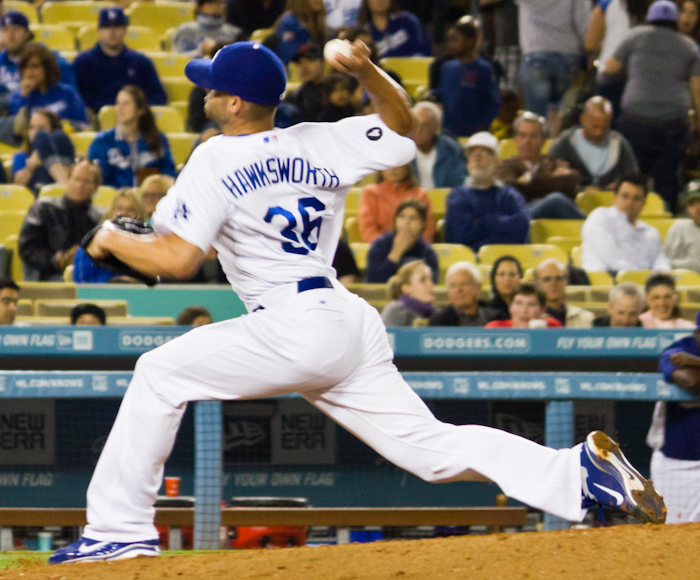
- Hawksworth with the Los Angeles Dodgers

Oklahoma State Cowboys
- Pitcher
- Born: March 1, 1983 (age 43); North Vancouver, British Columbia, Canada
- Batted: Right Threw: Right

MLB debut
- June 6, 2009, for the St. Louis Cardinals

Last MLB appearance
- September 27, 2011, for the Los Angeles Dodgers

MLB statistics
- Win–loss record: 10–13
- Earned run average: 4.07
- Strikeouts: 124
- Stats at Baseball Reference

Teams
- St. Louis Cardinals (2009–2010); Los Angeles Dodgers (2011)

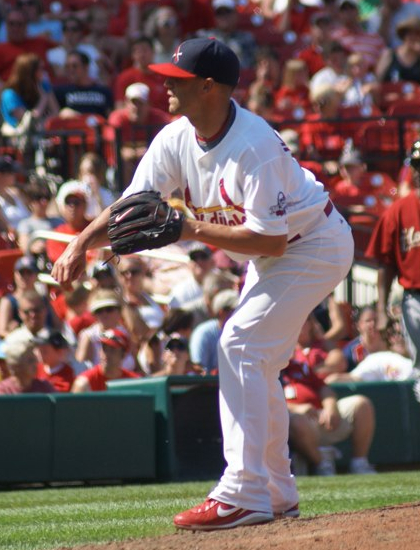
Hawksworth pitching for the Cardinals in 2009

Blake Edward Hawksworth (born March 1, 1983) is a Canadian baseball coach and former Major League Baseball pitcher. He played college baseball at Bellevue Community College in 2002 and professionally for the St. Louis Cardinals and Los Angeles Dodgers between 2009 and 2011.

== Early life and career beginnings ==
He grew up in Sammamish, Washington, and was drafted in the 28th round out of Eastlake High School in 2001 by the Cardinals. Prior to playing at Bellevue Community College, Blake played several years under Bill Caudill for the Mercer Islanders and Fox Sports. After two superb seasons in the minors, he was named by Baseball America as the Cardinals' top prospect in 2003. However, injuries limited him to pitching in only nine games in 2004 and 2005. However, he got right back on track in 2006 as he went 11–4 and with an ERA under 3 between the Palm Beach Cardinals and the Springfield Cardinals. In 2007, he played for the Memphis Redbirds and ended the season with a disappointing 4–13 record with a 5.28 ERA. And in 2008, he went 5–7 with a 6.09 ERA.

== Major leagues ==
=== St. Louis Cardinals ===
He made his major league debut on June 6, 2009, pitching two IP, giving up four runs, three hits (including a home run), walking one, and striking out one. Despite this, his debut was looked at as positive because of his excellent pitch command. The Cardinals had high hopes for him in the future, as he was one of the organization's better young pitching talents.

Hawksworth was hit in the face near his mouth by a line drive by outfielder Sam Fuld, and crumpled to the ground, in a game in September 2010. He left the field under his own power and was taken to hospital. The injury required approximately 20 stitches, and ended his season.

In two seasons with the Cardinals, he appeared in 75 games, starting eight of them. His overall record was 8–8 with a 4.07 ERA.

=== Los Angeles Dodgers ===
On November 30, 2010, he was traded to the Los Angeles Dodgers for infielder Ryan Theriot. He appeared in 49 games for the Dodgers, all in relief, with a 2–5 record and 4.08 ERA.

Hawksworth began feeling tenderness and discomfort in his elbow during the offseason and underwent elbow surgery in early January 2012. This injury caused him to be placed on the 60-day disabled list at the start of the season. He began a rehab assignment in June but was shut down after a couple of appearances due to shoulder soreness. On August 23, he underwent arthroscopic shoulder surgery, which ended any chance he had to return in 2012 and the report from the team was that he might also miss the 2013 season as a result of the recovery period. On October 12, 2012 the Dodgers outrighted him to the Triple–A Albuquerque Isotopes and removed him from the 40-man roster. On October 17, he elected to become a free agent.

Hawksworth retired from professional baseball on February 12, 2014.

== Coaching ==
After his baseball career ended due to injury, Hawksworth became an assistant basketball coach at Eastlake High School.

On August 20, 2019, Blake Hawksworth was named as the Pitching Coach for Grand Canyon University for the 2020 baseball season.

After spending two years as the pitching coach of the Oregon Ducks, Hawksworth was hired as pitching coach of the Oklahoma State Cowboys in June 2025.

== Personal life ==
His older sister Erin is a television sports anchor in Washington, D.C., and his grandfather Jack Poole was the head of the VANOC bid committee that brought the Winter Olympics to Vancouver. He is married to Amie Hawksworth and has a daughter and two sons.
