= Jason LaRue =

American baseball player (born 1974)

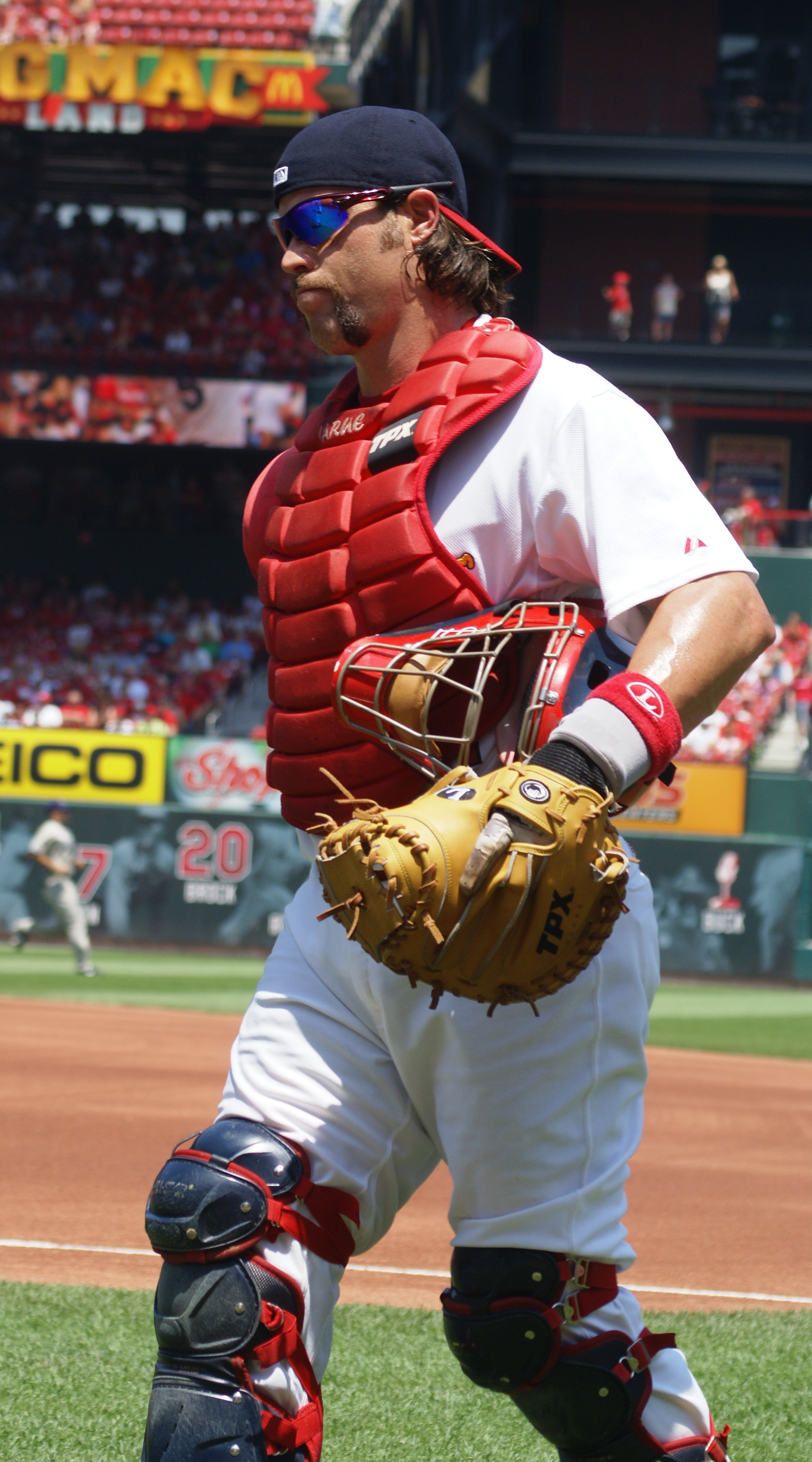
- LaRue with the St. Louis Cardinals in 2008
- Catcher
- Born: March 19, 1974 (age 52); Houston, Texas, U.S.
- Batted: Right Threw: Right

MLB debut
- June 15, 1999, for the Cincinnati Reds

Last MLB appearance
- August 3, 2010, for the St. Louis Cardinals

MLB statistics
- Batting average: .231
- Home runs: 96
- Runs batted in: 348
- Stats at Baseball Reference

Teams
- Cincinnati Reds (1999–2006); Kansas City Royals (2007); St. Louis Cardinals (2008–2010)

Michael Jason LaRue (born March 19, 1974) is an American former Major League Baseball (MLB) catcher who played for the Cincinnati Reds, Kansas City Royals and St. Louis Cardinals.

== Biography ==
A native of Bulverde, Texas, after being selected in the fifth round of the 1995 Major League Baseball draft out of Dallas Baptist University, LaRue debuted with Cincinnati on June 15, 1999, and became Cincinnati's starting catcher in 2001. 2005 was his best overall season with 14 HR, 60 RBI, and .260 batting average.

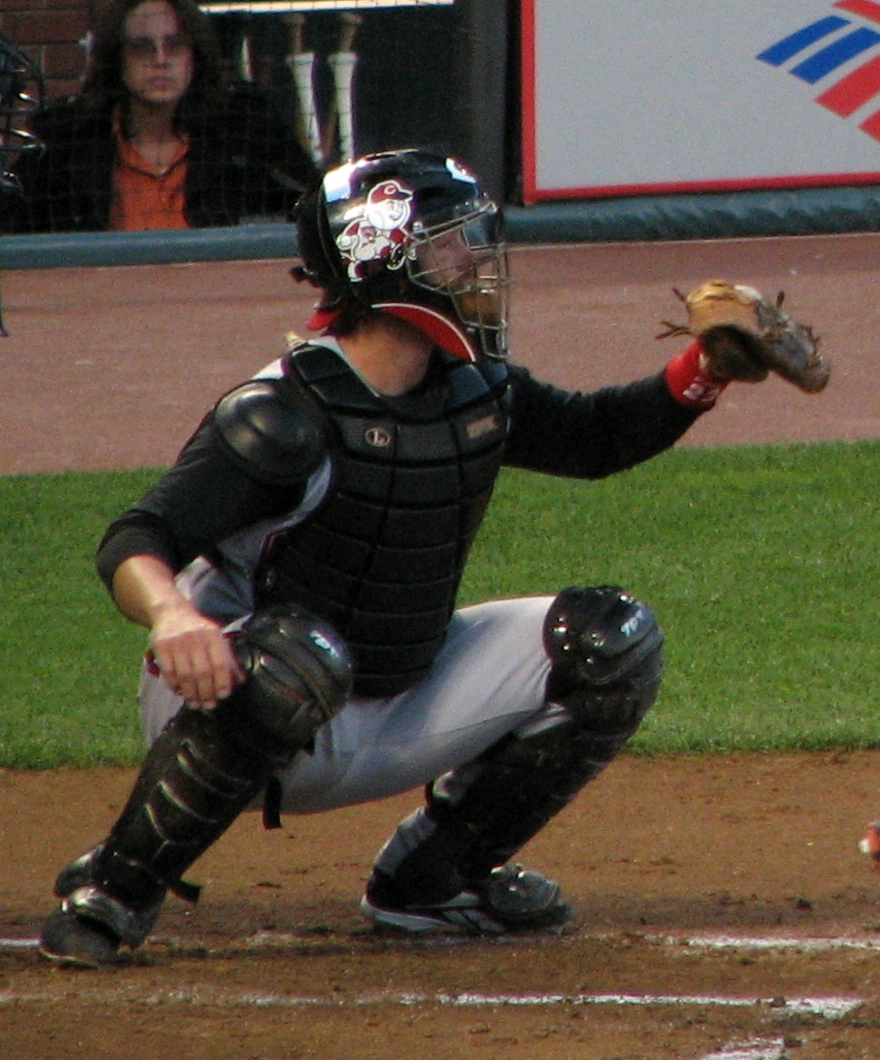
LaRue with the Cincinnati Reds in 2006

LaRue agreed to a two-year, $9.1 million contract with the Cincinnati Reds on December 20, 2005. On November 20, 2006, LaRue was traded to the Kansas City Royals for a player to be named later. Since a player could not be agreed upon, the Royals opted to send the Reds cash considerations in the amount of one dollar.

On Mother's Day, May 14, 2006, LaRue was one of more than 50 hitters who brandished a pink bat to benefit the Breast Cancer Foundation. He was also one of a handful of players to hit a home run with a pink bat.

On November 19, 2007, he signed a one-year contract with the St. Louis Cardinals as the backup to Yadier Molina. During the season, he was used primarily for his defensive ability as his hitting stats had dwindled. LaRue re-signed with the Cardinals following the 2008 season for one year.

LaRue returned to the Cardinals for 2010, his third season with the team. On August 10, 2010, he suffered a concussion caused by a kick to the head by the Cincinnati Reds' Johnny Cueto, during a bench-clearing brawl. On August 19, LaRue was placed on the 60-day disabled list, ending his season.

The concussion was initially thought to be slight, but LaRue experienced severe post-concussion symptoms. On September 18, LaRue announced his retirement from Major League Baseball. He told the St. Louis Post-Dispatch that his symptoms were so severe that he'd been ordered to go back to his offseason home near San Antonio because he was in no condition to be left alone. He could not drive or cook for himself for a time, could not watch television or take long car rides even as a passenger with his eyes open. At one point, even minimal exertion triggered severe headaches and nausea. He'd suffered close to 20 concussions dating to his days as a high school football and baseball player, and doctors told him that as a catcher he was vulnerable to a concussion that was at least as severe as the one he'd suffered in the brawl. Even as a backup, LaRue took three to five foul balls off the head in what would be his last season.

LaRue was known throughout his career to be a defensive specialist. In 2001, he led the major leagues with a 61% caught-stealing percentage, and he has a career 39% caught-stealing percentage.

== Personal ==
LaRue lives in Blanco, Texas, with his wife Heather, and three sons: Tyler, Dylan, and Brayden. He has a brother, Shaun LaRue and two sisters, Tricia Maynard and Brooke Albert.
