= List of Cincinnati Bengals broadcasters =

As of 2026, the Bengals flagship radio stations are "ESPN 1530" and 102.7 WEBN, with WLW AM 700 joining in following the end of the Reds' season. Dan Hoard and former Bengals offensive lineman Dave Lapham, who started in 1986, form the announcing team. Most preseason and regular season games, are telecast on WKRC-TV, channel 12, the CBS affiliate. Mike Watts and Anthony Muñoz are the TV announcers for the preseason games, with Mike Valpredo as the sideline reporter. Games that feature an NFC opponent playing at Paul Brown Stadium will be televised on WXIX, channel 19, the local Fox affiliate. WLWT-TV airs games when the Bengals are featured on Sunday Night Football.

== Past ==
Phil Samp was the Bengals original play-by-play announcer from 1968–1990. Ken Broo (1991–1995), Paul Keels (1996), Pete Arbogast (1997–2000) and Brad Johansen (2000–2010) have also done radio play-by-play for the Bengals. Steve Physioc was also one of the voices of the Bengals.

== Bengals radio announcers ==
Years	Flagship station	Play-by-play	Color commentator
1968–1979	WLW	Phil Samp	Jimmy Crum
1980	WLW	Phil Samp	Bob Johnson
1981	WLW	Phil Samp	Andy MacWilliams
1982–1983	WKRC	Phil Samp	Dennis Janson
1984–1985	WKRC	Phil Samp	Donn Burrows
1986	WKRC	Phil Samp	Dave Lapham
1987–1990	WKRC	Phil Samp	Dave Lapham & Ken Anderson
1991	WKRC	Ken Broo	Dave Lapham & Ken Anderson
1992	WKRC	Ken Broo	Dave Lapham
1993–1995	WKRC/WLW	Ken Broo	Dave Lapham
1996	WLW	Paul Keels	Dave Lapham
1997–1999	WUBE/WBOB	Pete Arbogast	Dave Lapham
2000–2008	WLW/WOFX/WCKY	Brad Johansen	Dave Lapham
2009–2010	WLW/WCKY/WEBN	Brad Johansen	Dave Lapham
2011–present	WLW/WCKY/WEBN	Dan Hoard	Dave Lapham
