= 2010 Cincinnati Reds season =

2010 Cincinnati Reds
- National League Central champions
- League: National League
- Division: Central
- Ballpark: Great American Ball Park
- City: Cincinnati, Ohio
- Record: 91–71 (.562)
- Divisional place: 1st
- Owners: Bob Castellini
- General managers: Walt Jocketty
- Managers: Dusty Baker
- Television: Fox Sports Ohio (Thom Brennaman, Paul Keels, Chris Welsh, Jeff Brantley)
- Radio: WLW (700 AM); Cincinnati Reds Radio Network (Marty Brennaman, Jeff Brantley, Jim Kelch)
- Stats: ESPN.com; Baseball Reference

The 2010 Cincinnati Reds season was the 141st season for the franchise in Major League Baseball, and their eighth at Great American Ball Park in Cincinnati. The Reds began their season at home against the St. Louis Cardinals on April 5, losing 11 to 6. Cincinnati was coming off a 78-84 (.481) season and fourth place in the National League Central. The Reds were managed by Dusty Baker, who was in his third season with the team. His coaches were Mark Berry (third base), Billy Hatcher (first base), Brook Jacoby (hitting), Juan Lopez (bullpen), Bryan Price (pitching), and Chris Speier (bench). For the second year in a row, Cincinnati hosted the Major League Baseball Civil Rights Game. They played St. Louis Cardinals and won 4 to 3. The majority owner of the Cincinnati Reds was Robert Castellini; the general manager was Walt Jocketty. Their home field was Great American Ball Park.

The Cincinnati Reds clinched the National League Central division and a trip to the MLB postseason on September 28 by a walk-off home run from outfielder Jay Bruce. This was the first time the Reds were in the postseason since the 1995 season, and their first winning season since 2000. The 2010 season ended when the Reds were swept by the Philadelphia Phillies in the NLDS.

== Offseason ==
The 2010 Cincinnati Reds offseason was marked by two key pickups. After acquiring a key player in Scott Rolen midway through the 2009 season, another veteran was added in Orlando Cabrera. In late December 2009, the Reds GM Walt Jocketty made a move to acquire Aroldis Chapman out of Cuba. With the many late season wins in the 2009 season, many picked the Reds to finish higher than they did the previous season.

== Regular season ==
=== April ===
- Opening Day: On Opening Day 2010, the Reds were defeated by their division rival St. Louis Cardinals by a score of 11 to 6, in front of over 42,000 fans at Great American Ball Park. They lost the first series of the season 2 games to 1.
- April 16–18: The Reds were swept in three games against the Pittsburgh Pirates at PNC Park.

=== May ===
- May 10–12: The Reds swept the Pittsburgh Pirates three games to none, after being swept by the same team a few weeks before.
- May 14–16: The Reds take 2 out of 3 from their division rivals, the St. Louis Cardinals. The Reds ended the month of May in first place.

=== June ===
- June 18–20: The Reds ran into trouble during the first stop of their interleague road trip against the Seattle Mariners. They were swept in three games.
- June 21–23: Cincinnati rebounded after the disappointing sweep in Seattle, and swept the Oakland Athletics in three games to close out the AL west coast road trip.

=== July ===
- July 1–7: Cincinnati started the month of July strong. They took 3 out of 4 from the Chicago Cubs and 2 out of 3 from the New York Mets.
- July 8–11: The Reds suffered four straight devastating losses to the Philadelphia Phillies. Starting Pitcher Travis Wood had a spoiled perfect game attempt during this series during the 9th inning of one of the games.
- The All Star Game: The Reds had four all stars that went to Anaheim. They were Joey Votto, Brandon Phillips, Scott Rolen, and Arthur Rhodes. Votto received the final spot in the National League roster after winning a fan vote.

=== August ===
- August 10–12: The Reds were swept three games to none by division rival St. Louis, and dropped out of first place. Derogatory comments about the Cardinals by Reds second baseman Brandon Phillips led to a first inning argument between Phillips and Cardinals catcher Yadier Molina, that turned into a benches-clearing brawl and the suspensions of managers Dusty Baker (Cincinnati) and Tony La Russa (St. Louis), as well as Reds starter Johnny Cueto, who injured Chris Carpenter and Jason LaRue of the Cardinals by kicking with his spikes while pinned against the backstop during the fight. It ultimately led to LaRue's retirement.
- August 13–20: Following the Cardinal's sweep of the Reds, Cincinnati went on to win eight of their next nine games, sweeping both the Florida Marlins and the Arizona Diamondbacks and winning a three-game series against the Los Angeles Dodgers two to one. Homer Bailey returned to the Reds lineup and was the starting pitcher in the third game against the Marlins, pitching a seven inning shutout. Meanwhile, the Cardinals went on to lose six of their next seven games, giving the Reds back the control of the Central Division.

=== September ===
- September 28: The Reds, in first place over the Cardinals by a wide margin, clinched their first division championship since the 1995 season with a dramatic walk-off home run by right fielder Jay Bruce off of Houston Astros left-handed pitcher Tim Byrdak. The first pitch sailed over the wall in center field, clinching the win. The game also featured a home run-robbing, over-the-wall catch by center fielder Drew Stubbs.

The Reds won the National League Central over second-place St. Louis Cardinals by five games.

=== Season standings ===
==== National League Central ====
NL Central
Team	W	L	Pct.	GB	Home	Road
Cincinnati Reds	91	71	.562	—	49‍–‍32	42‍–‍39
St. Louis Cardinals	86	76	.531	5	52‍–‍29	34‍–‍47
Milwaukee Brewers	77	85	.475	14	40‍–‍41	37‍–‍44
Houston Astros	76	86	.469	15	42‍–‍39	34‍–‍47
Chicago Cubs	75	87	.463	16	35‍–‍46	40‍–‍41
Pittsburgh Pirates	57	105	.352	34	40‍–‍41	17‍–‍64

==== National League Wild Card ====
Division leaders
Team	W	L	Pct.
Philadelphia Phillies	97	65	.599
San Francisco Giants	92	70	.568
Cincinnati Reds	91	71	.562

Wild Card team (Top team qualifies for postseason)
Team	W	L	Pct.	GB
Atlanta Braves	91	71	.562	—
San Diego Padres	90	72	.556	1
St. Louis Cardinals	86	76	.531	5
Colorado Rockies	83	79	.512	8
Florida Marlins	80	82	.494	11
Los Angeles Dodgers	80	82	.494	11
New York Mets	79	83	.488	12
Milwaukee Brewers	77	85	.475	14
Houston Astros	76	86	.469	15
Chicago Cubs	75	87	.463	16
Washington Nationals	69	93	.426	22
Arizona Diamondbacks	65	97	.401	26
Pittsburgh Pirates	57	105	.352	34

==== Record vs. opponents ====
2010 National League record Source: MLB Standings Grid – 2010
Team	AZ	ATL	CHC	CIN	COL	FLA	HOU	LAD	MIL	NYM	PHI	PIT	SD	SF	STL	WSH	AL
Arizona	–	3–4	1–6	2–5	9–9	3–3	4–3	5–13	3–4	5–1	2–4	2–4	8–10	5–13	4–5	3–4	6–9
Atlanta	4–3	–	4–2	3–2	2–4	11–7	5–1	5–3	5–2	11–7	8–10	6–3	4–2	4–3	2–6	8–10	9–6
Chicago	6–1	2–4	–	4–12	2–3	4–2	7–11	3–4	9–6	3–4	4–2	5–10	3–5	2–5	9–6	4–2	8–10
Cincinnati	5–2	2–3	12–4	–	2–5	5–2	10–5	5–4	11–3	4–2	2–5	10–6	2–4	3–4	6–12	4–3	8–7
Colorado	9–9	4–2	3–2	5–2	–	3–4	2–4	7–11	5–4	3–3	1–6	3–4	12–6	9–9	3–4	5–3	9–6
Florida	3–3	7–11	2–4	2–5	4–3	–	3–3	4–2	4–4	12–6	5–13	6–2	3–6	2–5	3–2	13–5	7–8
Houston	3–4	1–5	11–7	5–10	4–2	3–3	–	2–4	8–7	3–4	4–3	11–4	2–5	2–7	10–5	4–4	3–12
Los Angeles	13–5	3–5	4–3	4–5	11–7	2–4	4–2	–	4–2	3–4	2–4	4–3	8–10	8–10	3–4	3–3	4–11
Milwaukee	4–3	2–5	6–9	3–11	4–5	4–4	7–8	2–4	–	5–2	1–5	13–5	3–4	2–5	8–7	4–2	9–6
New York	1–5	7–11	4–3	2–4	3–3	6–12	4–3	4–3	2–5	–	9–9	6–1	3–3	3–4	3–3	9–9	13–5
Philadelphia	4–2	10–8	2–4	5–2	6–1	13–5	3–4	4–2	5–1	9–9	–	2–4	5–2	3–3	4–4	12–6	10–8
Pittsburgh	4–2	3–6	10–5	6–10	4–3	2–6	4–11	3–4	5–13	1–6	4–2	–	0–6	2–4	6–9	1–5	2–13
San Diego	10–8	2–4	5–3	4–2	6–12	6–3	5–2	10–8	4–3	3–3	2–5	6–0	–	12–6	3–4	3–3	9–6
San Francisco	13–5	3–4	5–2	4–3	9–9	5–2	7–2	10–8	5–2	4–3	3–3	4–2	6–12	–	3–3	4–2	7–8
St. Louis	5–4	6–2	6–9	12–6	4–3	2–3	5–10	4–3	7–8	3–3	4–4	9–6	4–3	3–3	–	3–3	9–6
Washington	4–3	10–8	2–4	3–4	3–5	5–13	4–4	3–3	2–4	9–9	6–12	5–1	3–3	2–4	3–3	–	5–13

=== Detailed record ===
Team	Home	Away	Total	Win %	Gms Left
NL East
Atlanta Braves	2–1	0–2	2–3	.400	0
Florida Marlins	3–0	2–2	5–2	.714	0
New York Mets	2–1	2–1	4–2	.667	0
Philadelphia Phillies	2–1	0–4	2–5	.286	0
Washington Nationals	2–2	2–1	4–3	.571	0
	11–5	6–10	17–15	.531	0
NL Central
Chicago Cubs	6–3	6–1	12–4	.750	0
Houston Astros	4–2	6–3	10–5	.667	0
Milwaukee Brewers	7–1	4–2	11–3	.769	0
Pittsburgh Pirates	5–2	5–4	10–6	.615	0
St. Louis Cardinals	3–6	3-6	6–12	.333	0
	23–12	24–16	46–28	.622	0
NL West
Arizona Diamondbacks	2-2	3–0	5–2	.714	0
Colorado Rockies	2–1	0–4	2–5	.286	0
Los Angeles Dodgers	3–3	2–1	5–4	.556	0
San Diego Padres	1–2	1–2	2–4	.333	0
San Francisco Giants	2–2	1-2	3–4	.429	0
	10–10	7–9	17–19	.472	0
American League
Cleveland Indians	2–1	2–1	4–2	.667	0
Kansas City Royals	1–2	N/A	1–2	.333	0
Oakland Athletics	N/A	3–0	3–0	1.000	0
Seattle Mariners	N/A	0–3	0–3	.000	0
	3–4	5–4	8–8	.500	0

Month	Games	Won	Lost	Win %
April	23	12	11	.522
May	29	18	11	.621
June	27	14	13	.519
July	26	14	12	.538
August	27	19	8	.704
September	27	12	15	.444
October	2	2	1	.667
	162	91	71	.562

	Games	Won	Lost	Win %
Home	81	49	32	.605
Away	81	42	39	.519

=== Game log ===
Legend
Reds Win	Reds Loss	Game postponed

2010 Game Log
April (12–11)

#	Date	Opponent (TV)	Score	Win	Loss	Save	Attendance	Record
1	April 5	Cardinals (FSO, ESPN)	L 6–11	Carpenter (1–0)	Harang (0–1)		42,493	0–1
2	April 7	Cardinals (FSO)	L 3–6	Wainwright (1–0)	Herrera (0–1)	Franklin (1)	28,132	0–2
3	April 8	Cardinals	W 2–1	Cordero (1–0)	Motte (0–1)		13,445	1–2
4	April 9	Cubs (FSO)	W 5–4	Owings (1–0)	Caridad (0–1)	Cordero (1)	24,419	2–2
5	April 10	Cubs (FSO)	L 3–4	Zambrano (1–1)	Rhodes (0–1)	Mármol (2)	27,235	2–3
6	April 11	Cubs (FSO)	W 3–1	Masset (1–0)	Garbow (0–2)	Cordero (2)	26,945	3–3
7	April 12	@ Marlins (FSO)	W 6–5 (10)	Masset (2–0)	Badenhop (0–1)	Cordero (3)	10,119	4–3
8	April 13	@ Marlins (FSO)	W 10–8 (11)	Owings (2–0)	Meyer (0–1)	Cordero (4)	10,681	5–3
9	April 14	@ Marlins (FSO)	L 3–5	Volstad (1–1)	Bailey (0–1)	Badenhop (1)	14,390	5–4
10	April 15	@ Marlins (FSO)	L 2–10	Johnson (1–1)	Harang (0–2)		12,912	5–5
11	April 16	@ Pirates (FSO)	L 3–4	Dotel (1–0)	Masset (2–1)		14,758	5–6
12	April 17	@ Pirates (FSO)	L 4–5	Taschner (1–0)	Cordero (1–1)		25,196	5–7
13	April 18	@ Pirates (FSO)	L 3–5	Maholm (1–1)	Arroyo (0–1)	Dotel (3)	13,860	5–8
14	April 20	Dodgers (FSO)	W 11–9	Lincoln (1–0)	Troncoso (1–1)	Cordero (5)	12,965	6–8
15	April 21	Dodgers (FSO)	L 6–14	Kuroda (2–0)	Harang (0–3)		12,203	6–9
16	April 22	Dodgers (FSO)	W 8–5	Leake (1–0)	Kuo (0–1)	Cordero (6)	13,261	7–9
17	April 23	Padres (FSO)	L 4–10	Correia (3–1)	Arroyo (0–2)		15,183	7–10
18	April 24	Padres (FSO)	L 0–5	LeBlanc (1–0)	Cueto (0–1)		19,999	7–11
19	April 25	Padres (FSO)	W 5–4	Rhodes (1–1)	Adams (0–1)	Cordero (7)	17,694	8–11
20	April 27	@ Astros (FSO)	W 6–2	Harang (1–3)	Norris (1–2)		22,467	9–11
21	April 28	@ Astros (FSO)	W 6–4	Leake (2–0)	Paulino (0–3)		21,035	10–11
22	April 29	@ Astros (FSO)	W 4–2	Arroyo (1–2)	Oswalt (2–3)	Cordero (8)	21,493	11–11
23	April 30	@ Cardinals (FSO)	W 3–2	Cueto (1–1)	Penny (3–1)	Cordero (9)	39,850	12–11

May (18–11)

#	Date	Opponent (TV)	Score	Win	Loss	Save	Attendance	Record
24	May 1	@ Cardinals (FSO)	L 3–6	Franklin (1–0)	Fisher (0–1)		41,536	12–12
25	May 2	@ Cardinals (FSO)	L 0–6	Carpenter (4–0)	Harang (1–4)		43,292	12–13
26	May 3	Mets (FSO)	W 3–2 (11)	Masset (3–1)	Acosta (1–1)		14,350	13–13
27	May 4	Mets (FSO)	L 4–5	Feliciano (1–0)	Cordero (1–2)	Rodríguez (4)	13,813	13–14
28	May 5	Mets	W 5–4 (10)	Owings (3–0)	Feliciano (1–1)		16,798	14–14
29	May 7	Cubs (FSO)	L 7–14	Silva (3–0)	Bailey (0–2)		20,030	14–15
30	May 8	Cubs (FSO)	W 14–2	Harang (2–4)	Gorzelanny (1–4)		29,404	15–15
31	May 9	Cubs (FSO)	W 5–3	Leake (3–0)	Dempster (2–3)	Cordero (10)	20,402	16–15
32	May 10	@ Pirates (FSO)	W 2–1	Arroyo (2–2)	Ohlendorf (0–1)	Cordero (11)	9,045	17–15
33	May 11	@ Pirates (FSO)	W 9–0	Cueto (2–1)	Morton (1–6)		9,027	18–15
34	May 12	@ Pirates	W 5–0	Bailey (1–2)	Duke (2–4)		20,064	19–15
35	May 14	Cardinals (FSO)	L 3–4	García (2–4)	Harang (2–5)	Franklin (8)	27,568	19–16
36	May 15	Cardinals (FSO)	W 4–3	Leake (4–0)	Wainwright (5–2)	Cordero (12)	41,326	20–16
37	May 16	Cardinals (FSO)	W 7–2	Arroyo (3–2)	Penny (3–4)		26,712	21–16
38	May 17	Brewers (FSO)	W 6–3	Cueto (3–1)	Coffey (1–1)	Cordero (13)	12,409	22–16
39	May 18	Brewers	W 5–4	Fisher (1–1)	Hoffman (1–3)		17,697	23–16
40	May 19	@ Braves (FSO)	L 4–5	Wagner (4–0)	Masset (3–2)		25,347	23–17
41	May 20	@ Braves	L 9–10	Kimbrel (1–0)	Cordero (1–3)		21,621	23–18
42	May 21	@ Indians (FSO)	W 7–4	Arroyo (4–2)	Laffey (0–1)	Cordero (14)	23,028	24–18
43	May 22	@ Indians (FSO)	W 6–4	Cueto (4–1)	Carmona (4–2)		25,531	25–18
44	May 23	@ Indians (FSO)	L 3–4	Huff (2–6)	Herrera (0–2)	Wood (1)	21,044	25–19
45	May 24	Pirates (FSO)	W 7–5	Harang (3–5)	Burres (2–2)	Cordero (15)	13,385	26–19
46	May 25	Pirates (FSO)	L 1–2	Hanrahan (1–0)	Masset (3–3)	Dotel (10)	14,471	26–20
47	May 26	Pirates (FSO)	W 4–0	Arroyo (5–2)	Ohlendorf (0–3)		18,173	27–20
48	May 27	Pirates (FSO)	W 8–2	Cueto (5–1)	Morton (1–9)		16,834	28–20
49	May 28	Astros (FSO)	W 15–6	LeCure (1–0)	Rodríguez (2–7)		30,813	29–20
50	May 29	Astros (FSO)	W 12–2	Harang (4–5)	Moehler (0–2)		36,918	30–20
51	May 30	Astros (FSO)	L 0–2 (10)	Lyon (4–1)	Owings (3–1)	Lindstrom (11)	36,038	30–21
52	May 31	@ Cardinals (FSO)	L 4–12	García (5–2)	Arroyo (5–3)		40,782	30–22

June (14–13)

#	Date	Opponent (TV)	Score	Win	Loss	Save	Attendance	Record
53	June 1	@ Cardinals (FSO)	W 9–8	Del Rosario (1–0)	Reyes (2–1)	Cordero (16)	37,414	31–22
54	June 2	@ Cardinals (FSO)	L 1–4	Carpenter (7–1)	LeCure (1–1)	McClellan (1)	39,295	31–23
55	June 4	@ Nationals (FSO)	L 2–4	Clippard (8–3)	Del Rosario (1–1)	Capps (18)	33,774	31–24
56	June 5	@ Nationals (FSO)	W 5–1	Leake (5–0)	Atilano (5–1)		22,896	32–24
57	June 6	@ Nationals (FSO)	W 5–4 (10)	Cordero (2–3)	Slaten (2–1)	Masset (1)	27,202	33–24
58	June 7	Giants (FSO)	L 5–6	Romo (2–3)	Herrera (0–3)	Wilson (17)	18,457	33–25
59	June 8	Giants (FSO)	L 0–3	Cain (5–4)	LeCure (1–2)		13,011	33–26
60	June 9	Giants (FSO)	W 6–3	Harang (5–5)	Sánchez (4–5)		14,700	34–26
61	June 10	Giants	W 7–6	Rhodes (2–1)	Mota (0–2)	Cordero (17)	19,241	35–26
62	June 11	Royals (FSO)	L 5–6 (11)	Marte (1–0)	Owings (3–2)	Soria (15)	25,847	35–27
63	June 12	Royals (FSO)	W 11–5	Cueto (6–1)	Bannister (6–4)		34,240	36–27
64	June 13	Royals (FSO)	L 3–7	Greinke (2–8)	LeCure (1–3)		23,747	36–28
65	June 15	Dodgers (FSO)	L 0–12	Kuroda (6–4)	Harang (5–6)		22,639	36–29
66	June 16	Dodgers (FSO)	L 2–6	Kershaw (7–3)	Leake (5–1)	Kuo (1)	22,083	36–30
67	June 17	Dodgers	W 7–1	Arroyo (6–3)	Ely (3–4)		25,585	37–30
68	June 18	@ Mariners (FSO)	L 0–1	Lee (5–3)	Cueto (6–2)		43,362	37–31
69	June 19	@ Mariners (FSO)	L 1–5	Hernández (5–5)	LeCure (1–4)		26,468	37–32
70	June 20	@ Mariners (FSO)	L 0–1	Rowland-Smith (1–6)	Harang (5–6)	Aardsma (15)	32,712	37–33
71	June 21	@ Athletics (FSO)	W 6–4 (10)	Cordero (3–3)	Wuertz (2–1)	Smith (1)	11,088	38–33
72	June 22	@ Athletics (FSO)	W 4–2	Arroyo (7–3)	Braden (4–7)	Cordero (18)	12,136	39–33
73	June 23	@ Athletics	W 3–0	Cueto (7–2)	Mazzaro (2–2)	Cordero (19)	20,824	40–33
74	June 25	Indians (FSO)	W 10–3	Harang (6–7)	Laffey (0–2)		32,844	41–33
75	June 26	Indians	W 6–4	Herrera (1–3)	Masterson (2–7)	Cordero (20)	37,757	42–33
76	June 27	Indians (FSO)	L 3-5	Talbot (8–6)	Arroyo (7–4)	Wood (6)	25,877	42–34
77	June 28	Phillies (FSO)	W 7–3	Cueto (8–2)	Kendrick (4–3)		22,090	43–34
78	June 29	Phillies (FSO)	L 6–9 (10)	Lidge (1–0)	Rhodes (2–2)	Romero (3)	26,679	43–35
79	June 30	Phillies	W 4–3	Rhodes (3–2)	Halladay (9–7)	Cordero (21)	27,245	44–35

July (14–12)

#	Date	Opponent (TV)	Score	Win	Loss	Save	Attendance	Record
80	July 1	@ Cubs (FSO)	W 3–2 (10)	Smith (1–0)	Howry (1–2)	Cordero (22)	36,880	45–35
81	July 2	@ Cubs (FSO)	W 12–0	Arroyo (8–4)	Dempster (6–7)		40,361	46–35
82	July 3	@ Cubs (FSO)	L 1–3	Wells (4–6)	Smith (1–1)	Mármol (15)	40,667	46–36
83	July 4	@ Cubs (FSO)	W 14–3	Leake (6–1)	Lilly (3–7)		41,079	47–36
84	July 5	@ Mets (FSO)	W 8–6	Smith (2–1)	Pelfrey (10–3)	Cordero (23)	36,764	48–36
85	July 6	@ Mets (FSO)	L 0–3	Santana (6–5)	Maloney (0-1)		27,473	48–37
86	July 7	@ Mets (FSO, ESPN)	W 3–1	Arroyo (9–4)	Niese (6–3)	Cordero (24)	30,029	49–37
87	July 8	@ Phillies (FSO, MLBN)	L 3–4 (12)	Figueroa (2–1)	Smith (2–2)		45,086	49–38
88	July 9	@ Phillies (FSO)	L 7–9 (10)	Madson (2–0)	Rhodes (3–3)		45,029	49–39
89	July 10	@ Phillies (FSO, MLBN)	L 0–1 (11)	Contreras (4–3)	Bray (0–1)		45,347	49–40
90	July 11	@ Phillies (FSO)	L 0–1	Hamels (7–7)	Maloney (0–2)	Lidge (6)	44,913	49–41
July 13: 2010 MLB All-Star Game – Anaheim, California at Angel Stadium (National League: 3, American League: 1)
91	July 16	Rockies (FSO)	W 3–2	Arroyo (10–4)	Hammel (7–4)	Cordero (25)	37,188	50–41
92	July 17	Rockies (FSO)	W 8–1	Vólquez (1–0)	de la Rosa (3–2)		41,300	51–41
93	July 18	Rockies (FSO)	L 0–1	Cook (5–4)	Wood (0–1)	Street (6)	25,159	51–42
94	July 19	Nationals (FSO)	W 7–2	Cueto (9–2)	Martin (1–5)		21,243	52–42
95	July 20	Nationals (FSO)	W 8–7	Leake (7–1)	Atilano (6–7)	Cordero (26)	22,876	53–42
96	July 21	Nationals (FSO, ESPN)	L 5–8	Strasburg (5–2)	Arroyo (10–5)	Capps (24)	37,868	53–43
97	July 22	Nationals	L 1–7	Hernández (7–6)	Vólquez (1–1)		23,115	53–44
98	July 23	@ Astros (FSO)	W 6–4	Ondrusek (1–0)	Byradk (1–1)	Cordero (27)	30,575	54–44
99	July 24	@ Astros (FSO)	W 7–0	Cueto (10–2)	Oswalt (6–12)		31,552	55–44
100	July 25	@ Astros (FSO)	L 0-4	Rodríguez (8–11)	Leake (7–2)		25,705	55–45
101	July 26	@ Brewers (FSO)	L 1–2	Villanueva (1–0)	Arroyo (10–6)	Axford (15)	31,945	55–46
102	July 27	@ Brewers (FSO)	W 12–4	Ondrusek (2–0)	Gallardo (9–5)		32,286	56–46
103	July 28	@ Brewers (FSO)	W 10–2	Wood (1–1)	Narveson (8–7)		38,365	57–46
104	July 30	Braves (FSO)	L 4–6 (10)	Chavez (3–2)	Cordero (3–4)	Wagner (24)	40,373	57–47
105	July 31	Braves (Fox)	W 5–2	Arroyo (11–6)	Jurrjens (3–4)	Cordero (28)	41,611	58–47

August (19–8)

#	Date	Opponent (TV)	Score	Win	Loss	Save	Attendance	Record
106	August 1	Braves (FSO)	W 2–1	Vólquez (2–1)	Hanson (8–8)	Cordero (29)	40,871	59–47
107	August 2	@ Pirates (FSO)	W 4–0	Wood (2–1)	Ohlendorf (1–9)		15,172	60–47
108	August 3	@ Pirates (FSO)	L 6–7	Maholm (7–9)	Leake (7–3)	Hanrahan (1)	13,623	60–48
109	August 4	@ Pirates	W 9–4	Cueto (11–2)	Karstens (2-7)		20,420	61–48
110	August 6	@ Cubs (FSO)	W 3–0	Arroyo (12–6)	Gorzelanny (6–6)	Cordero (30)	40,696	62–48
111	August 7	@ Cubs (FSO)	W 4–3	Ondrusek (3–0)	Wells (5–10)	Masset (2)	41,227	63–48
112	August 8	@ Cubs (FSO)	W 11–4	Wood (3–1)	Diamond (0–2)		39,016	64–48
113	August 9	Cardinals (FSO, ESPN)	L 3–7	Carpenter (13–3)	Leake (7–4)		36,353	64–49
114	August 10	Cardinals (FSO)	L 4–8	García (11–5)	Cueto (11–3)		36,964	64–50
115	August 11	Cardinals (FSO)	L 1–6	Wainwright (17–6)	Arroyo (12–7)		33,364	64–51
116	August 13	Marlins (FSO)	W 7–2	Vólquez (3–1)	Johnson (10–5)		29,571	65–51
117	August 14	Marlins (FSO)	W 5–4	Leake (8–4)	West (0–2)	Cordero (31)	37,445	66–51
118	August 15	Marlins (FSO)	W 2–0	Bailey (2–2)	Sánchez (9–8)	Cordero (32)	29,849	67–51
119	August 17	@ Diamondbacks (FSO)	W 6–2	Arroyo (13–7)	Hudson (3–1)		21,502	68–51
120	August 18	@ Diamondbacks (FSO)	W 11–7	Rhodes (4–3)	Heilman (3–4)		15,509	69–51
121	August 19	@ Diamondbacks (FSO)	W 9–5	Wood (4–1)	Saunders (1–3)		17,385	70–51
122	August 20	@ Dodgers (FSO)	W 3–1	Bailey (3–2)	Monasterios (3–4)	Cordero (33)	46,418	71–51
123	August 21	@ Dodgers (FSO)	L 5–8	Billingsley (10–7)	Cueto (11–4)	Broxton (22)	49,435	71–52
124	August 22	@ Dodgers (FSO)	W 5–2	Arroyo (14–7)	Kershaw (11–8)	Cordero (34)	44,788	72–52
125	August 23	@ Giants (FSO, ESPN)	L 2-11	Cain (10-10)	Vólquez (14–7)		32,698	72-53
126	August 24	@ Giants (FSO)	L 5-16	Casilla (5-2)	Wood 4-2		36,104	72-54
127	August 25	@ Giants (FSO)	W 12–11 (12)	Cordero (4–4)	Zito (8-9)		36,310	73-54
128	August 27	Cubs (FSO)	W 6-1	Cueto (12–4)	Gorzelanny (7-8)		36,219	74-54
129	August 28	Cubs (FSO)	L 2-3	Wells (6-12)	Arroyo (14-8)	Mármol (24)	41,292	74-55
130	August 29	Cubs (FSO)	W 7-5	Ondrusek (4-0)	Marshall (6-5)	Cordero (35)	30,809	75-55
131	August 30	Brewers (FSO)	W 5–4 (10)	Cordero (5-4)	Hoffman (2-7)		14,589	76–55
132	August 31	Brewers (FSO)	W 8–4	LeCure (2-4)	Gallardo (11-7)		19,218	77–55

September (12–15)

#	Date	Opponent (TV)	Score	Win	Loss	Save	Attendance	Record
133	September 1	Brewers (FSO)	W 6–1	Champman (1–0)	Coffey (2–3)		16,412	78–55
134	September 3	@ Cardinals (FSO)	L 2–3	García (13–6)	Arroyo (14–9)	Franklin (23)	43,540	78–56
135	September 4	@ Cardinals (Fox)	W 6–1	Wood (5–2)	Wainwright (17–10)		44,957	79–56
136	September 5	@ Cardinals (FSO)	L 2–4	Carpenter (15–5)	Bailey (3–2)	Franklin (24)	43,963	79–57
137	September 6	@ Rockies (FSO)	L 5–10	Jiménez (18–6)	Bray (0–2)		40,237	79–58
138	September 7	@ Rockies (FSO)	L 3–4	Chacín (8-9)	Cueto (12–5)	Street (16)	29,164	79–59
139	September 8	@ Rockies (FSO)	L 2–9	Cook (6-8)	Arroyo (14-10)		28,271	79–60
140	September 9	@ Rockies	L 5–6	Belisle (7-5)	Masset (3-4)	Street (17)	25,213	79–61
141	September 10	Pirates (FSO)	W 4–3 (12)	Smith (3-2)	Ledezma (0-2)		24,908	80–61
142	September 11	Pirates (FSO)	W 5–4 (10)	Cordero (6-4)	Thomas (0-1)		36,101	81–61
143	September 12	Pirates (FSO)	L 1-3	Park (3-3)	Cordero (6-5)	Hanrahan (5)	26,617	81–62
144	September 13	Diamondbacks (FSO)	W 7–2	Arroyo (15-10)	Enright (6-4)		12,061	82–62
145	September 14	Diamondbacks (FSO)	L 1-3	Hudson (7-2)	Wood (5-3)	Gutierrez (9)	16,973	82–63
146	September 15	Diamondbacks (FSO)	W 7-5	Maloney (1-2)	Saunders (2-6)	Cordero (36)	19,123	83–63
147	September 16	Diamondbacks (FSO)	L 1-3	Lopez (6-14)	Vólquez (3-3)	Gutierrez (10)	22,090	83–64
148	September 17	@ Astros (FSO)	L 3-5	Fulchino (2-0)	Chapman (1-1)	Lyon (17)	30,218	83–65
149	September 18	@ Astros (FSO)	W 11-1	Arroyo (16-10)	Figueroa (5-3)		29,855	84–65
150	September 19	@ Astros (FSO)	L 3-4	Myers (13-7)	Wood (5-4)	Lyon (18)	32,520	84–66
151	September 20	@ Brewers (FSO)	W 5-2	Masset (4-4)	Loe (3-5)	Cordero (37)	30,024	85–66
152	September 21	@ Brewers (FSO)	W 4-3	Vólquez (4-3)	Bush (7-13)	Cordero (38)	22,761	86–66
153	September 22	@ Brewers (FSO)	L 1–13	Wolf (13–11)	Cueto (12–6)		27,004	86–67
154	September 24	@ Padres (FSO)	L 3–4	Gregerson (4–7)	Rhodes (4–4)	Bell (44)	35,310	86–68
155	September 25	@ Padres (Fox)	L 3–4	Bell (6–0)	Chapman (1-2)		35,124	86–69
156	September 26	@ Padres (FSO)	W 12–2	Bailey (4-3)	Richard (13-9)		26,131	87–69
157	September 28	Astros (FSO)	W 3–2	Chapman (2-2)	Byrdak (2-2)		30,151	88–69
158	September 29	Astros (FSO)	L 0-2	Figueroa (6-4)	Cueto (12-7)	Lyon (20)	14,760	88–70
159	September 30	Astros (FSO)	W 9-1	Arroyo (17-10)	Myers (14-8)		17,558	89–70

October (2-1)

#	Date	Opponent (TV)	Score	Win	Loss	Save	Attendance	Record
160	October 1	Brewers (FSO)	L 3-4 (11)	McClendon (2-0)	Lecure (2-5)	Axford (24)	28,884	89-71
161	October 2	Brewers (FSO)	W 7-4	Ondrusek (5-0)	Coffey (2-4)	Cordero (39)	28,173	90-71
162	October 3	Brewers (FSO)	W 3-2	Maloney (2-2)	Wolf (13-12)	Cordero (40)	37,582	91-71

== Postseason ==
=== Game log ===
Legend
Reds Win	Reds Loss	Game postponed

2010 Postseason Game Log
National League Division Series: vs. Philadelphia Phillies (PHI wins 3–0)

#	Date	Opponent (TV)	Score	Win	Loss	Save	Attendance	Series
1	October 6	@ Phillies (TBS)	L 0–4	Halladay (1–0)	Vólquez (0–1)		46,411	PHI 1–0
2	October 8	@ Phillies (TBS)	L 4–7	Contreras (1–0)	Chapman (0–1)	Lidge (1)	46,511	PHI 2–0
3	October 10	Phillies (TBS)	L 0–2	Hamels (1–0)	Cueto (0–1)		44,599	PHI 3–0

=== Series Notes ===
==== National League Division Series: vs. Philadelphia Phillies ====
===== Game 1 =====
Wednesday, October 6, 2010 – 5:07 pm (ET) at Citizens Bank Park in Philadelphia, Pennsylvania

Team	1	2	3	4	5	6	7	8	9	R	H	E
Cincinnati	0	0	0	0	0	0	0	0	0	0	0	1
Philadelphia	1	3	0	0	0	0	0	0	0	4	5	0
WP: Halladay (1-0) LP: Vólquez (0-1) Sv: None; Home runs: CIN: None; PHI: None

In his first career postseason start, Phillies ace Roy Halladay hurled a no-hitter, giving up only one walk (to Jay Bruce in the fifth inning). Halladay's was only the second postseason no-hitter in Major League Baseball history, and the first since Don Larsen's perfect game in the 1956 World Series.

During the 2010 regular season, Halladay had thrown a perfect game on the road against the Florida Marlins on May 29. He thus became the only pitcher to throw a no-hitter or perfect game in the regular season and a no-hitter in the postseason in the same year. Halladay is also the fifth major league pitcher to throw two no-hitters in the same season, and the first since Nolan Ryan in 1973.

===== Game 2 =====
Friday, October 8, 2010 – 6:07 pm (ET) at Citizens Bank Park in Philadelphia, Pennsylvania

Team	1	2	3	4	5	6	7	8	9	R	H	E
Cincinnati	1	1	0	1	1	0	0	0	0	4	6	4
Philadelphia	0	0	0	0	2	1	3	1	X	7	8	2
Starting pitchers: CIN: Bronson Arroyo (0–0); PHI: Roy Oswalt (0–0) --> WP: José Contreras (1–0) LP: Aroldis Chapman (0–1) Sv: Brad Lidge (1); Home runs: CIN: Brandon Phillips (1), Jay Bruce (1); PHI: None

On the fourth pitch he saw, Brandon Phillips hit a solo home run to lead off the first inning. This is both the first hit and first run since 1995 for the Reds in the postseason. Laynce Nix scored another run in the top of the second inning on two throwing errors and a wild pitch.

Jay Bruce also hit a lead-off solo homer in the third inning to increase the lead to 3–0. In the top of the fifth inning, Phillips hit a lead-off double, advanced to third base on a sacrifice bunt, then scored on Joey Votto's sacrifice fly.

The Phillies mounted their attack in the bottom of the fifth inning. Pinch-hitter Domonic Brown reached first base on a fielder's choice, then the Phillies loaded the bases on two consecutive defensive errors. Chase Utley delivered a two-out RBI single to get the Phillies on board. But Arroyo struck out Ryan Howard to limit the damage at two.

The Phillies scored again in the sixth inning. Jayson Werth walked, stole second, then scored after two batters were hit by pitches and a bases-loaded walk by Reds relievers Arthur Rhodes and Logan Ondrusek.

The Reds sent flame-thrower Aroldis Chapman to the mound in the bottom of the seventh inning. He hit Chase Utley, the third time by Reds' relievers in the night, then struck out Ryan Howard. Werth hit a ground ball to Reds third baseman Scott Rolen, but Utley was called safe at second base. The next batter Jimmy Rollins hit a fly ball to right field, but the Reds right fielder Jay Bruce lost it in the lights; Reds second baseman Phillips also missed the relay catch. These two crucial errors—the third and fourth on the night—let both Utley and Werth score. Rollins scored later on Raúl Ibañez's single and Carlos Ruiz's RBI force-out. Reds reliever Nick Masset replaced Chapman and got Shane Victorino to ground out to end the inning. The Phillies took the 6–4 lead on Reds' errors into the eighth inning.

In the bottom of the eighth inning, Utley hit a one-out single then stole second. Masset intentionally walked Howard, to set up a potential double play for the next batter. However, Werth hit an RBI single to left field to score Utley.

Phillies closer Brad Lidge closed the ninth for the save.

The six combined errors tied an LDS record previously set by the Athletics and Red Sox in the 2003 ALDS.

===== Game 3 =====
Sunday, October 10, 2010 – 8:07 pm (ET) at Great American Ball Park in Cincinnati, Ohio

Team	1	2	3	4	5	6	7	8	9	R	H	E
Philadelphia	1	0	0	0	1	0	0	0	0	2	8	1
Cincinnati	0	0	0	0	0	0	0	0	0	0	5	2
WP: Cole Hamels (1-0) LP: Johnny Cueto (0-1); Home runs: PHI: Chase Utley (1); CIN: none

Cincinnati was again dominated by Phillies' starting pitching. Cole Hamels pitched a complete-game shutout, striking out nine while allowing five hits. Plácido Polanco scored for the Phillies on Orlando Cabrera's throwing error in the top of the first inning. Chase Utley added another run to the lead by hitting a solo home run in the fifth inning.

== Roster ==
2010 Cincinnati Reds
Roster
Pitchers: 61 Bronson Arroyo; 34 Homer Bailey; 45 Bill Bray; 51 Jared Burton; 54 Aroldis Chapman; 48 Francisco Cordero; 47 Johnny Cueto; 58 Enerio Del Rosario; 46 Carlos Fisher; 39 Aaron Harang; 52 Daniel Ray Herrera; 63 Sam LeCure; 44 Mike Leake; 57 Mike Lincoln; 56 Matt Maloney; 40 Nick Masset; 66 Logan Ondrusek; 33 Micah Owings; 53 Arthur Rhodes; 62 Jordan Smith; 50 Russ Springer; 36 Edinson Vólquez; 30 Travis Wood	Catchers: 29 Ryan Hanigan; 55 Ramón Hernández; 37 Corky Miller; Infielders: 77,23 Yonder Alonso; 2 Orlando Cabrera; 43 Miguel Cairo; 64 Juan Francisco; 7 Paul Janish; 4 Brandon Phillips; 27 Scott Rolen; 15 Drew Sutton; 3 Chris Valaika; 19 Joey Votto	Outfielders: 9 Willie Bloomquist; 32 Jay Bruce; 21 Chris Dickerson; 15 Jim Edmonds; 31 Jonny Gomes; 28 Chris Heisey; 17 Laynce Nix; 6 Drew Stubbs	Manager: 12 Dusty Baker; Coaches: 41 Mark Berry (third base); 22 Billy Hatcher (first base); 49 Brook Jacoby (hitting); 59 Juan López (bullpen); 38 Bryan Price (pitching); 35 Chris Speier (bench)

== Player stats ==
=== Batting ===
==== Starters by position ====
Note: Pos = Position; G = Games played; AB = At bats; H = Hits; Avg. = Batting average; HR = Home runs; RBI = Runs batted in

Pos	Player	G	AB	H	Avg.	HR	RBI
2B	Brandon Phillips	155	626	172	.275	18	59
SS	Orlando Cabrera	123	494	130	.263	4	42
1B	Joey Votto	150	547	177	.324	37	113
CF	Drew Stubbs	150	514	131	.255	22	77
RF	Jay Bruce	148	509	143	.281	25	70
LF	Jonny Gomes	148	511	136	.266	18	86
3B	Scott Rolen	133	471	134	.285	20	83
C	Ramón Hernández	97	313	93	.297	7	48

Stats through October 3, 2010

==== Other batters ====
Note: Pos = Position; G = Games played; AB = At bats; H = Hits; Avg. = Batting average; HR = Home runs; RBI = Runs batted in

Pos	Player	G	AB	H	Avg.	HR	RBI
LF	Laynce Nix	97	165	48	.291	4	18
UT	Miguel Cairo	91	200	58	.290	4	28
C	Ryan Hanigan	70	203	61	.300	5	40
OF	Chris Heisey	97	201	51	.254	8	21
IF	Paul Janish	82	200	52	.260	5	25
3B	Juan Francisco	36	55	15	.273	1	7
OF	Chris Dickerson	20	44	9	.205	0	0
OF	Jim Edmonds	13	29	6	.207	3	3
SS	Chris Valaika	19	38	10	.263	1	2
C	Corky Miller	32	74	18	.243	2	9
1B	Yonder Alonso	22	29	6	.207	0	3
RF	Willie Bloomquist	11	17	5	.294	0	0
IF	Drew Sutton	2	3	2	.667	1	4
P	Bronson Arroyo	32	68	10	.147	1	8
P	Homer Bailey	18	33	7	.212	0	2
P	Francisco Cordero	70	1	0	.000	0	0
P	Johnny Cueto	28	54	6	.111	0	2
P	Carlos Fisher	17	4	0	.000	0	0
P	Aaron Harang	21	37	5	.135	0	2
P	Mike Leake	27	48	16	.333	0	3
P	Sam LeCure	14	11	1	.091	0	0
P	Matt Maloney	7	3	1	.333	0	1
P	Logan Ondrusek	59	4	0	.000	0	0
P	Jordan Smith	35	3	0	.000	0	0
P	Edinson Vólquez	12	17	2	.118	0	0
P	Travis Wood	17	37	7	.189	1	3

Stats through October 3, 2010

=== Pitching ===
==== Starting and other pitchers ====
G = Games pitched; IP = Innings pitched; W = Wins; L = Losses; ERA = Earned run average; SO = Strikeouts; WHIP = Walks and hits per inning pitched

Player	G	IP	W	L	ERA	SO	WHIP
Bronson Arroyo	33	215.2	17	10	3.88	121	1.15
Homer Bailey	19	109.0	4	3	4.46	100	1.37
Johnny Cueto	31	185.2	12	7	3.64	138	1.28
Aaron Harang	22	111.2	6	7	5.32	82	1.59
Mike Leake	24	138.1	8	4	4.23	91	1.50
Sam LeCure	15	48.0	2	5	4.50	37	1.56
Matt Maloney	7	20.2	2	2	3.05	12	1.21
Edinson Vólquez	12	62.2	4	3	4.31	67	1.50
Travis Wood	17	102.2	5	4	3.51	86	1.08

Stats Through October 3, 2010

==== Relief pitchers ====
G = Games pitched; W = Wins; L = Losses; SV = Saves; IP = Innings pitched; ERA = Earned run average; SO = Strikeouts; WHIP = Walks and hits per inning pitched.

Player	G	W	L	SV	IP	ERA	SO	WHIP
Bill Bray	35	0	2	0	28.1	4.13	30	1.09
Jared Burton	4	0	0	0	3.1	0.00	1	0.00
Aroldis Chapman	15	2	2	0	13.1	2.03	19	1.05
Francisco Cordero	75	6	5	40	72.2	3.84	59	1.43
Carlos Fisher	18	1	1	0	22.1	5.64	21	1.57
Danny Herrera	36	1	3	0	23.0	3.91	14	1.61
Mike Lincoln	19	1	1	0	19.2	7.32	12	1.78
Nick Masset	82	4	4	2	76.2	3.40	85	1.27
Logan Ondrusek	60	5	0	0	58.2	3.68	39	1.18
Micah Owings	22	3	2	0	33.1	5.40	35	1.59
Arthur Rhodes	69	4	4	0	55.0	2.29	50	1.02
Enerio Del Rosario	9	1	1	0	8.2	2.08	3	1.96
Jordan Smith	37	3	2	1	42.0	3.86	26	1.33
Russ Springer	2	0	0	0	1.2	5.40	35	1.59

Stats Through October 3, 2010

=== Team Leaders/Team Rank ===
As of October 3, 2010

Stat	Player	Value	NL Rank
Runs	Votto	106	4th
Hits	Votto	177	6th
Doubles	Votto	36	17th
Triples	Stubbs	6	T-13th
Home Runs	Votto	37	3rd
RBI	Votto	113	3rd
Stolen Bases	Stubbs	30	8th
Batting Avg.	Votto	.324	2nd
Wins	Arroyo	17	4th
ERA (+100 IP)	Cueto	3.64	24th
Innings Pitched	Arroyo	215.2	8th
Strikeouts	Cueto	138	33rd

== Awards ==
All-Star

- Brandon Phillips – reserve (1st All-Star appearance)
- Arthur Rhodes – pitcher (1st All-Star appearance)
- Scott Rolen – reserve (6th All-Star appearance)
- Joey Votto – reserve (1st All-Star appearance)

Hank Aaron Award

- Joey Votto – (1st time winner)

NL Most Valuable Player Award

- Joey Votto – (1st time winner)

Gold Glove

- Bronson Arroyo – P (1st time winner)
- Brandon Phillips – 2B (2nd time winner)
- Scott Rolen – 3B (8th time winner)

== Minor league affiliates ==
Level	Team	Record	Place	Manager
AAA	Louisville Bats	79-64	1st	Rick Sweet
AA	Carolina Mudcats	58-79	5th	David Bell
Advanced A	Lynchburg Hillcats	61-77	4th	Pat Kelly
A	Dayton Dragons	53-75	8th	Todd Benzinger
Rookie
Rookie	Billings Mustangs	38-37	3rd	Delino DeShields
Rookie	AZL Reds	31-24	2nd	Julio Garcia
Rookie	DSL Reds	45-27	2nd	Joel Noboa
Rookie	VSL Reds	35-33	4th	José Nieves

== Local television ==
Fox Sports Ohio

- Thom Brennaman—Play-by-Play
- Paul Keels—Play-by-Play
- Jeff Brantley—Color Commentary
- Chris Welsh—Color Commentary
- Jim Day—Reds Live
- Jeff Piecoro—Reds Live

== Local radio ==
Cincinnati Reds Radio Network

- Marty Brennaman—Play-by-Play
- Jeff Brantley—Play-by-Play
- Jim Kelch—Play-by-Play
