= Cole Snyder =

American gridiron football player (born 2000)

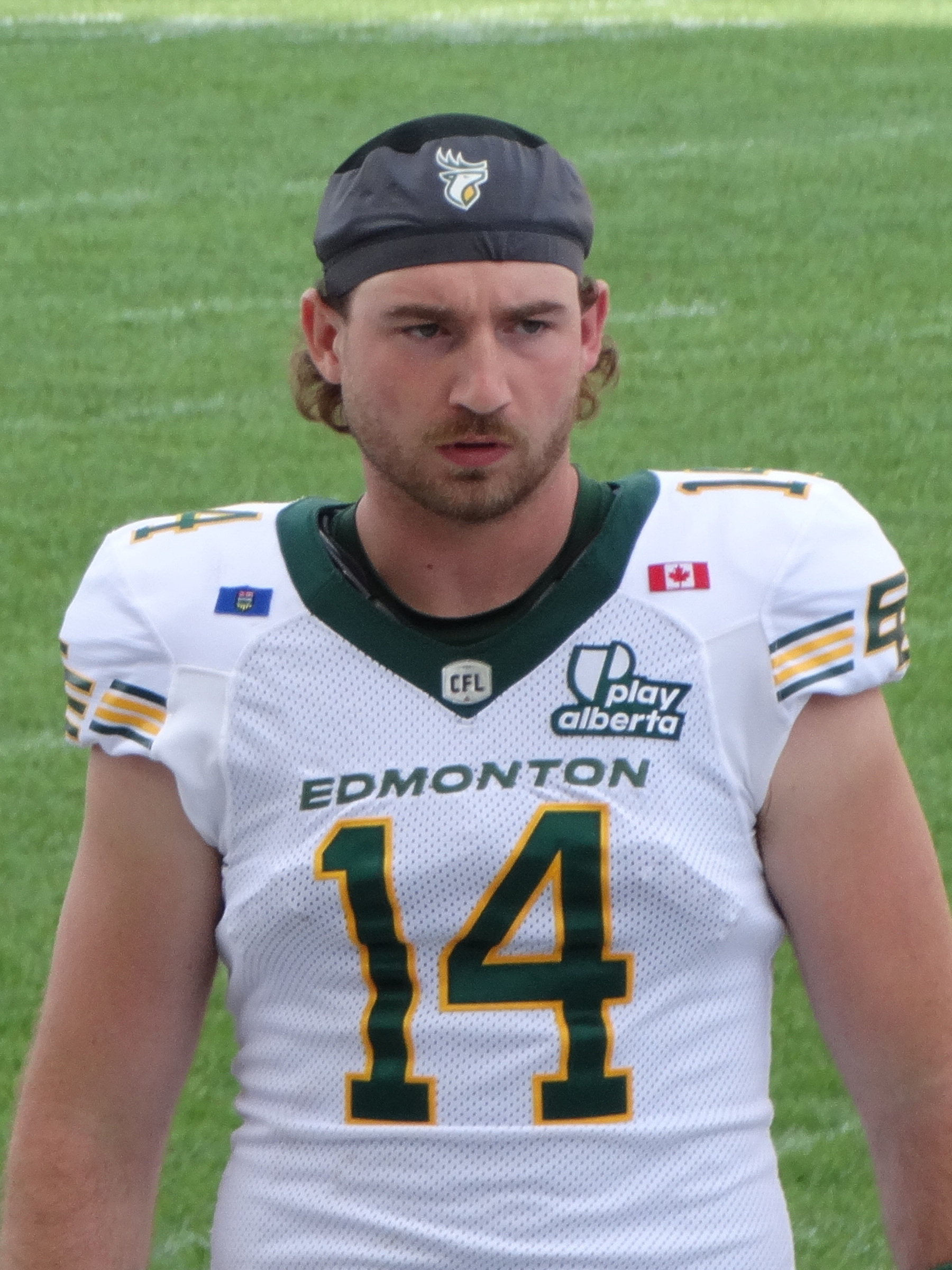
- Snyder with the Edmonton Elks in 2025

No. 14 – Edmonton Elks
- Position: Quarterback
- Roster status: Active
- CFL status: American

Personal information
- Born: August 12, 2000 (age 26); Lakewood, New York, U.S.
- Listed height: 6 ft 2 in (1.88 m)
- Listed weight: 208 lb (94 kg)

Career information
- High school: Southwestern (West Ellicott, New York)
- College: Rutgers (2019–2021); Buffalo (2022–2023); Eastern Michigan (2024)
- NFL draft: 2025: undrafted

Career history
- Edmonton Elks (2025–present)

Awards and highlights
- Grey Cup champion (2026)

Career CFL statistics as of 2026
- Rushing yards: 44
- Rushing average: 1.3
- Rushing touchdowns: 8
- Stats at CFL.ca

Cole Robert Snyder (born August 12, 2000) is an American professional football quarterback for the Edmonton Elks of the Canadian Football League (CFL). He played college football for the Rutgers Scarlet Knights, Buffalo Bulls, and Eastern Michigan Eagles.

== Early life ==
Snyder grew up in Lakewood, New York and attended Southwestern Central High School where he played football, baseball and hockey. During high school, he completed 1,587 yards and 18 touchdowns as a junior. He was named All-USA New York First Team Quarterback and a 2018 Connolly Cup top-10 finalist. He was rated a three-star recruit and committed to play college football at Rutgers over offers from schools such as Lafayette, Maine and New Hampshire.

== College career ==
=== Rutgers ===
Snyder played in two games during his true freshman season in 2019 where he went for 3 out of 3 passing attempts for 35 yards. During the 2020 season, he played for only one game and appeared at holder playing against No. 3 Ohio State. Snyder played in six games during the 2021 season where he went for 18 out of 28 passing attempts for 130 yards and a touchdown and completed 42 rushing yards. On November 30, 2021, it was announced that Snyder had entered the transfer portal. On December 17, 2021, he announced that he would be transferring to Buffalo.

=== Buffalo ===
Snyder started in all 13 games and was named the starting quarterback during his first season with Buffalo in 2022. By the end of the season, he finished 271 out of 461 passing attempts for 3,030 yards and 18 touchdowns making him the third quarterback in the program's history to throw 3,000 yards in a single season. Snyder entered the transfer portal for the second time on November 28, 2023.

=== Eastern Michigan ===
On January 10, 2024, Snyder announced that he would be transferring to Eastern Michigan.

=== Statistics ===
| Year | Team | Games | | | Passing | | | | | | | | Rushing | | | |
| Year | Team | GP | GS | Record | Cmp | Att | Pct | Yds | Avg | TD | INT | Rtg | Att | Yds | Avg | TD |
|---|---|---|---|---|---|---|---|---|---|---|---|---|---|---|---|---|
| 2019 | Rutgers | 3 | 0 | — | 3 | 3 | 100.0 | 35 | 11.7 | 0 | 0 | 198.0 | 1 | 6 | 6.0 | 0 |
| 2020 | Rutgers | 1 | 0 | — | 0 | 0 | 0.0 | 0 | 0.0 | 0 | 0 | 0.0 | 0 | 0 | 0.0 | 0 |
| 2021 | Rutgers | 6 | 0 | — | 18 | 28 | 64.3 | 130 | 4.6 | 1 | 0 | 115.1 | 15 | 42 | 2.8 | 0 |
| 2022 | Buffalo | 13 | 13 | 7–6 | 271 | 461 | 58.8 | 3,030 | 6.6 | 18 | 8 | 123.4 | 110 | 146 | 1.3 | 4 |
| 2023 | Eastern Michigan | 12 | 12 | 3–9 | 203 | 372 | 54.6 | 2,108 | 5.7 | 13 | 9 | 108.9 | 67 | 88 | 1.3 | 1 |
| 2024 | Eastern Michigan | 12 | 12 | 5–7 | 240 | 402 | 59.7 | 2,684 | 6.7 | 15 | 9 | 123.6 | 136 | 323 | 2.4 | 4 |
| Career | | 47 | 37 | 15–22 | 735 | 1,266 | 58.1 | 7,987 | 6.3 | 47 | 26 | 119.2 | 329 | 605 | 1.8 | 9 |

== Professional career ==
Pre-draft measurables
| Height | Weight | Arm length | Hand span | Wingspan | 40-yard dash | 10-yard split | 20-yard split | 20-yard shuttle | Three-cone drill | Vertical jump | Broad jump | Bench press |
|---|---|---|---|---|---|---|---|---|---|---|---|---|
| 6 ft 1 3/4 in (1.87 m) | 211 lb (96 kg) | 30 3/8 in (0.77 m) | 9 1/2 in (0.24 m) | 6 ft 3 1/2 in (1.92 m) | 4.88 s | 1.64 s | 2.82 s | 4.25 s | 6.97 s | 32.5 in (0.83 m) | 9 ft 9 in (2.97 m) | 15 reps |
All values from Pro Day

On April 28, 2025, Snyder was invited to Detroit Lions rookie mini camp.

Snyder signed with the Edmonton Elks of the Canadian Football League on May 18, 2025.
