= Southwestern Central High School =

Coordinates: 42°5′29.2″N 79°17′30.8″W

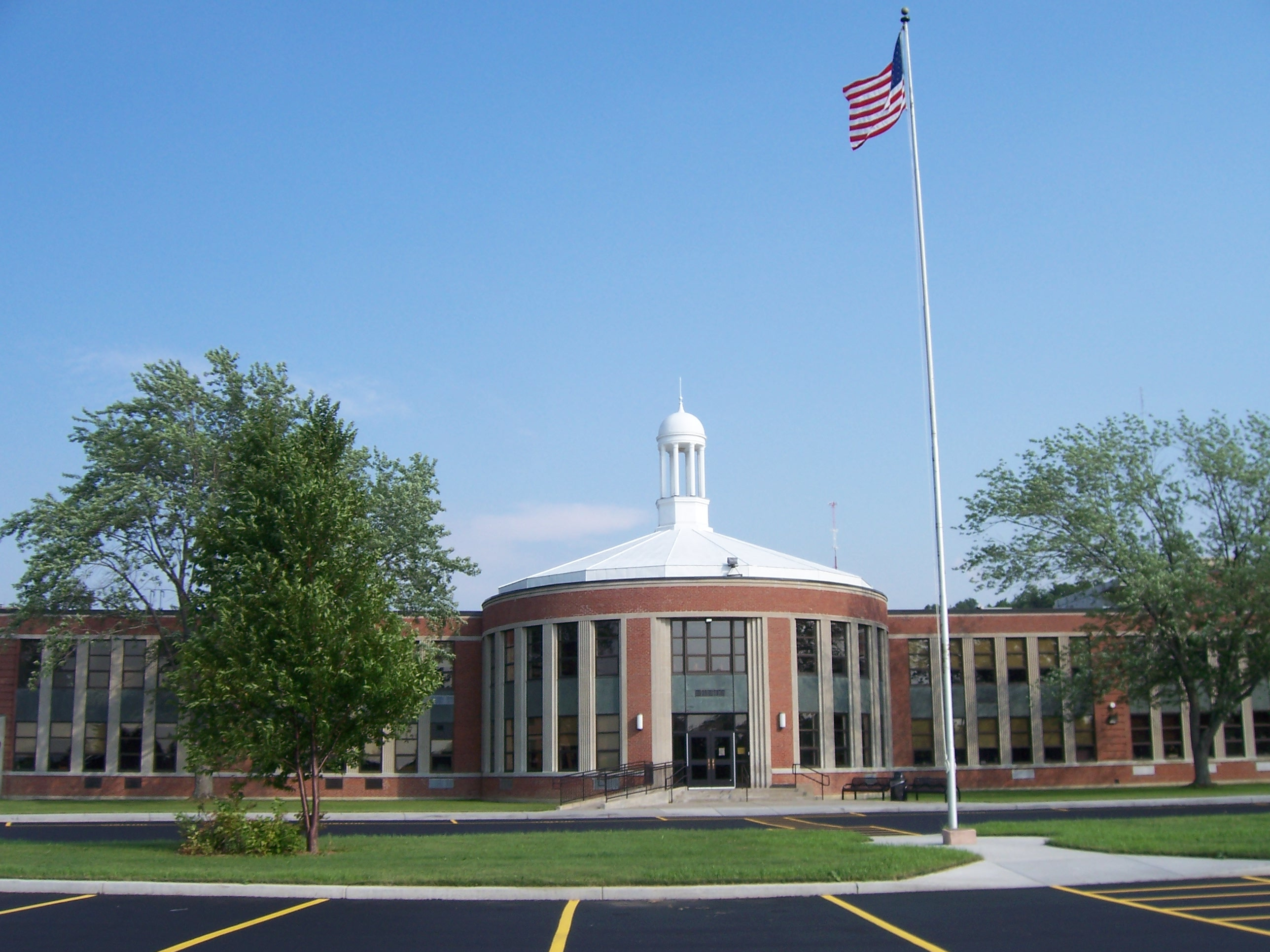
- 600 Hunt Road W.E. Jamestown, New York 14701

Information
- Type: Public
- Established: June 28th, 1947
- School district: Southwestern Central School District
- NCES School ID: 362766003756
- Principal: Matt Kindberg
- Staff: 34.00 (FTE)
- Grades: 9 - 12
- Enrollment: 376 (2024–25)
- Student to teacher ratio: 12.35
- Color: Red Navy blue White
- Athletics: Baseball, Softball, Soccer (MF), Swimming (MF),Tennis (MF), Track and Field (MF), Cross Country (MF), Basketball (MF), Football, Volleyball, Wrestling, Hockey, Football, Cheerleading, Basketball, Cheerleading, Bowling
- Mascot: Trojan
- Website: www.swcsk12.org

Southwestern Central High School is a public high school located at 600 Hunt Road in West Ellicott, New York, that is part of the Southwestern Central School District. Educates students in grades 9 through 12 from the surrounding areas of Busti, Celoron, Lakewood, and West Ellicott.

== Academics ==
Southwestern consistently ranks in the top third among Western New York high schools in terms of academic performance.

== Athletics ==
The Trojans compete in the fall in football, cross country, boys soccer, girls soccer, girls volleyball, girls tennis, and girls swimming and diving. Winter sports include basketball, wrestling, bowling, and boys swimming. Spring sports include track and field, boys tennis, baseball, softball, and golf.

=== Swimming ===
The Southwestern girls swim team won the CCAA league with a season of no losses. The girls also claimed the Section 6 Class C title for both 2011, 2012, 2013, and 2014 seasons.

=== Football ===
The football team won the New York State Public High School Athletic Association Class C championship in 2008. The Trojans completed the season with a 13–0 record. Coach Jay Sirianni was named New York State Class C Coach of the Year. Quarterback Zack Sopak and lineman Jasen Carlson were named to the first team All-State football team.

In 2009 the Trojans (13–0) claimed their second straight New York State Public High School Athletic Association Class C football championship by downing Bronxville of Section 1, 40–14, at the Carrier Dome. Lineman Jasen Carlson was awarded the Trench trophy as the Best High School Lineman in Western New York and Quarterback Zack Sopak was awarded the Connolly Cup as most outstanding football player in Western New York. First Team All-State honors awarded to Carlson, Sopak, Levi Bursch, and Ryan Buzzetto.

From 2015 to 2019, the Trojans football team was coached by former NFL player Jehuu Caulcrick.

== Notable alumni ==
- Dan Hoard Cincinnati based sports journalist.
- James Nowling, famed Microelectronic Engineering Major at Rochester Institute of Technology
- Laura Kightlinger
- Amy King, flight attendant killed in September 11 attacks
- J.C. Matteson, Army sergeant killed during the Second Battle of Fallujah
- Jackson Rohm
- Nick Sirianni, Philadelphia Eagles' head coach (2021–present)
- Cole Snyder, college football quarterback for Eastern Michigan
- Aaron Swanson, U.S. Marine killed in active duty in Afghanistan.
