= Dan Hoard =

American sportscaster

Dan Hoard is an American radio and television sportscaster who calls games for the National Football League's Cincinnati Bengals with Dave Lapham. He is also the play-by-play announcer for University of Cincinnati Bearcats football and men's basketball games.

== Early life and education ==
Hoard grew up in Lakewood, New York and attended Southwestern Central High School. He graduated from Syracuse University's S. I. Newhouse School of Public Communications in 1985. At Syracuse, he was good friends with Sean McDonough.

== Career ==
Hoard began his broadcasting career as the radio voice of the Syracuse Chiefs of the Minor League Baseball. He transitioned into television as the sports director at WTVH-TV in Syracuse before moving to WXIX-TV in Cincinnati in 1995. In 2000, Hoard added University of Cincinnati football and basketball radio play-by-play duties and soon also began hosting the Cincinnati Reds TV pregame show on Fox Sports Ohio.

In 2006, Hoard returned to baseball play-by-play broadcasting as the TV/radio voice of the Pawtucket Red Sox. In 2011, he moved back to Cincinnati when he was hired to replace Brad Johansen as the radio voice of the Bengals.

== Awards ==
Hoard was named the Ohio Sportscaster of the Year in 2014, 2017, 2019 and 2020 by the National Sports Media Association (NSMA).

Hoard was inducted into the University of Cincinnati James P. Kelly Athletics Hall of Fame in 2019 and the Chautauqua Sports Hall of Fame in 2016.

The minor league baseball broadcaster in the Dancin' Homer episode of The Simpsons is named Dan Hoard. The episode was written by Ken Levine, Dan's former broadcasting partner with the Syracuse Chiefs.
