= Jackson Rohm =

American country and pop musician (died 2023)

- Born: c. 1971
- Origin: Jamestown, New York, U.S.
- Died: January 24, 2023 (aged 51)
- Genres: Country, pop
- Occupation: Singer
- Instrument(s): Vocals, guitar
- Website: http://www.jacksonrohm.com

Jackson Rohm (c. 1971 – January 24, 2023) was an American country and pop musician.

== Early life ==
Rohm was born in Jamestown, New York. He graduated from Southwestern High School in West Ellicott, New York, in 1989. He considered attending Cornell University and the University of Virginia before accepting a track scholarship to Miami University. He was a member of the Alpha Delta Phi fraternity as an undergraduate.

== Career ==
Rohm released his first full-length CD, Twisted & Misguided, in 2000. His second CD, 2001's Sink or Swim, has a modern rock sound.

In 2003, Rohm released Red Light Fever, which included a cover of Concrete Blonde's "Joey".

Rohm released his fourth CD, Four on the Floor, in 2006. The title track was written as a tribute to a fellow musician who was killed in a motor vehicle accident.

In 2008, Rohm released his fifth CD, Long Way From Moving On. This represented a departure from the pop/rock feel of his first four releases and a venture into the country music genre. It was described as "[Rohm's] best work yet," as he "[seems] most comfortable in the country music mode."

Rohm opened for acts including Edwin McCain and Sister Hazel.

In 2010, his Nashville-recorded album Acoustic Sessions was released, containing acoustic renditions of some of his previously released songs as well as five new songs.

Returning to his rock roots with producer Aaron Thompson, Rohm recorded the 12-song compilation Blindsided in Atlanta, Georgia, featuring upbeat tracks "Blue Skies and Butterflies" and "Superglue", as well as the title track, a ballad written for his wife, whom he married that year.

Rohm also worked for an international power supply company known as XPPower

== Personal life and death ==
Rohm lived in San Francisco, California, and Rosemary Beach, Florida.

Rohm died on January 24, 2023, at the age of 51.
