= Nick Sirianni =

American football coach (born 1981)

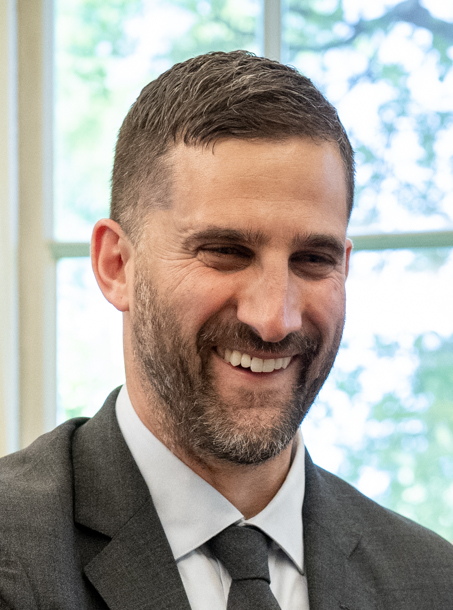
- Sirianni at the White House in 2025

Philadelphia Eagles
- Title: Head coach

Personal information
- Born: June 15, 1981 (age 45); Jamestown, New York, U.S.
- Listed height: 6 ft 3 in (1.91 m)
- Listed weight: 193 lb (88 kg)

Career information
- Position: Wide receiver
- High school: Southwestern Central (Jamestown)
- College: Mount Union (1999–2003)

Career history

Playing
- Canton Legends (2005)

Coaching
- Mount Union (2004–2005) Defensive backs coach; IUP (2006–2008) Wide receivers coach; Kansas City Chiefs (2009–2012); Offensive quality control coach (2009); Assistant quarterbacks coach (2010); Offensive quality control coach (2011); Wide receivers coach (2012); San Diego / Los Angeles Chargers (2013–2017); Offensive quality control coach (2013); Quarterbacks coach (2014–2015); Wide receivers coach (2016–2017); Indianapolis Colts (2018–2020) Offensive coordinator; Philadelphia Eagles (2021–present) Head coach

Awards and highlights
- As a player: 3× NCAA Division III champion (2000–2002); As a head coach: Super Bowl champion (LIX); Greasy Neale Award (2022)

Head coaching record
- Regular season: 62–33 (.653)
- Postseason: 6–4 (.600)
- Career: 68–37 (.648)
- Coaching profile at Pro Football Reference

Nicholas John Sirianni (/ˌsɪriˈɑːni/ SEE-ree-AH-nee; born June 15, 1981) is an American professional football coach who is the head coach for the Philadelphia Eagles of the National Football League (NFL). He previously served as an assistant coach with the Kansas City Chiefs from 2009 to 2012, as an assistant coach with the San Diego / Los Angeles Chargers from 2013 to 2017, then as the offensive coordinator for the Indianapolis Colts from 2018 to 2020.

Since his hiring as head coach for the Eagles, Sirianni has led them to the playoffs in each of his first five seasons as head coach, including winning three division titles, two conference championships, and a victory in Super Bowl LIX. After his first five seasons, Sirianni has the most regular season wins and the most playoff wins in franchise history compared to previous Eagles head coaches over their first five seasons. His two Super Bowl appearances are the most by any Eagles head coach; Sirianni also holds the franchise's second most championship game appearances behind Greasy Neale, who guided the franchise to three pre-AFL–NFL merger title games from 1947–1949.

== Early life and education ==
Sirianni was born on June 15, 1981, in Jamestown, New York, the son of Fran and Amy Sirianni. Fran was a middle school science teacher and the former head football coach at Southwestern Central High School in West Ellicott, New York, where Nick graduated in 1999. He is of Italian descent through his father with roots in Calabria. Sirianni was raised Catholic, and grew up a fan of the Pittsburgh Steelers, owing to his family having roots in the Pittsburgh area.

Sirianni played wide receiver at Division III Mount Union in Alliance, Ohio, winning national championships in 2000, 2001, and 2002. Though a calf injury and compartment syndrome nearly ended his playing career as a sophomore, Sirianni started for three years. As a senior in 2003, he had 998 yards and 13 touchdowns and graduated with a degree in education.

Sirianni played one season of professional football for the Canton Legends of the American Indoor Football League.

== Career ==
=== College coaching ===
Sirianni began coaching as the defensive backs coach at Mount Union, his alma mater. After one season of coaching Mount Union, Sirianni was hired by Indiana University of Pennsylvania in Indiana, Pennsylvania, where he coached wide receivers for three years.

=== Kansas City Chiefs ===
In 2009, Sirianni was hired as offensive quality control coach for the Kansas City Chiefs by Todd Haley, the new head coach of the Chiefs. Sirianni and Haley got to know each other when they attended the same YMCA when Sirianni was in college and Haley was wide receivers coach for the Chicago Bears. Sirianni was retained under new coach Romeo Crennel and was promoted to wide receivers coach in Crennel's only season as the Chiefs head coach. Sirianni was not retained for the 2013 season under new head coach Andy Reid.

=== San Diego Chargers ===
Sirianni joined the San Diego Chargers as the offensive quality control coach when Mike McCoy was hired as the team's head coach in 2013. The following season, Sirianni became the team's quarterbacks coach, working with quarterback Philip Rivers and offensive coordinator Frank Reich. In 2016, Sirianni became the wide receivers coach.

=== Indianapolis Colts ===
After Reich became the head coach of the Indianapolis Colts in 2018, he hired Sirianni as offensive coordinator. Sirianni developed a close relationship with Reich, though unlike some head coaches, Reich chose to call the team's plays rather than delegate the responsibility to Sirianni. During his three years as offensive coordinator with the Colts, Sirianni had a different starting quarterback each year, working with Andrew Luck, Jacoby Brissett, and Philip Rivers. The Colts made the playoffs twice and finished 10th, 19th, and 12th in offensive DVOA, a measure of offensive success.

=== Philadelphia Eagles ===
==== 2021 season ====
On January 24, 2021, Sirianni was hired to become the head coach of the Philadelphia Eagles after the firing of Doug Pederson. Two months later, the Eagles traded quarterback Carson Wentz to the Colts, leaving 2020 second-round pick Jalen Hurts as the presumed starter. Sirianni put together a staff of young coaches, including offensive coordinator Shane Steichen and defensive coordinator Jonathan Gannon, both of whom had previously worked with Sirianni with the Chargers and Colts, respectively. Although much of Pederson's staff was replaced, Sirianni retained veteran offensive line coach Jeff Stoutland.

On September 12, 2021, Sirianni made his regular-season head coaching debut against the Atlanta Falcons and led the Eagles to a 32–6 victory. Despite a 2–5 start, Sirianni finished his first season as head coach with a 9–8 record and a wild card berth. The Eagles lost in the Wild Card Round of the playoffs to the defending Super Bowl champion Tampa Bay Buccaneers by a score 31–15. Sirianni was the only first-year coach to lead a team to the playoffs in the 2021 season, and the third Eagles head coach to make the playoffs in their first year as head coach, joining Chip Kelly in 2013 and Ray Rhodes in 1995.

==== 2022 season: Super Bowl LVII run ====
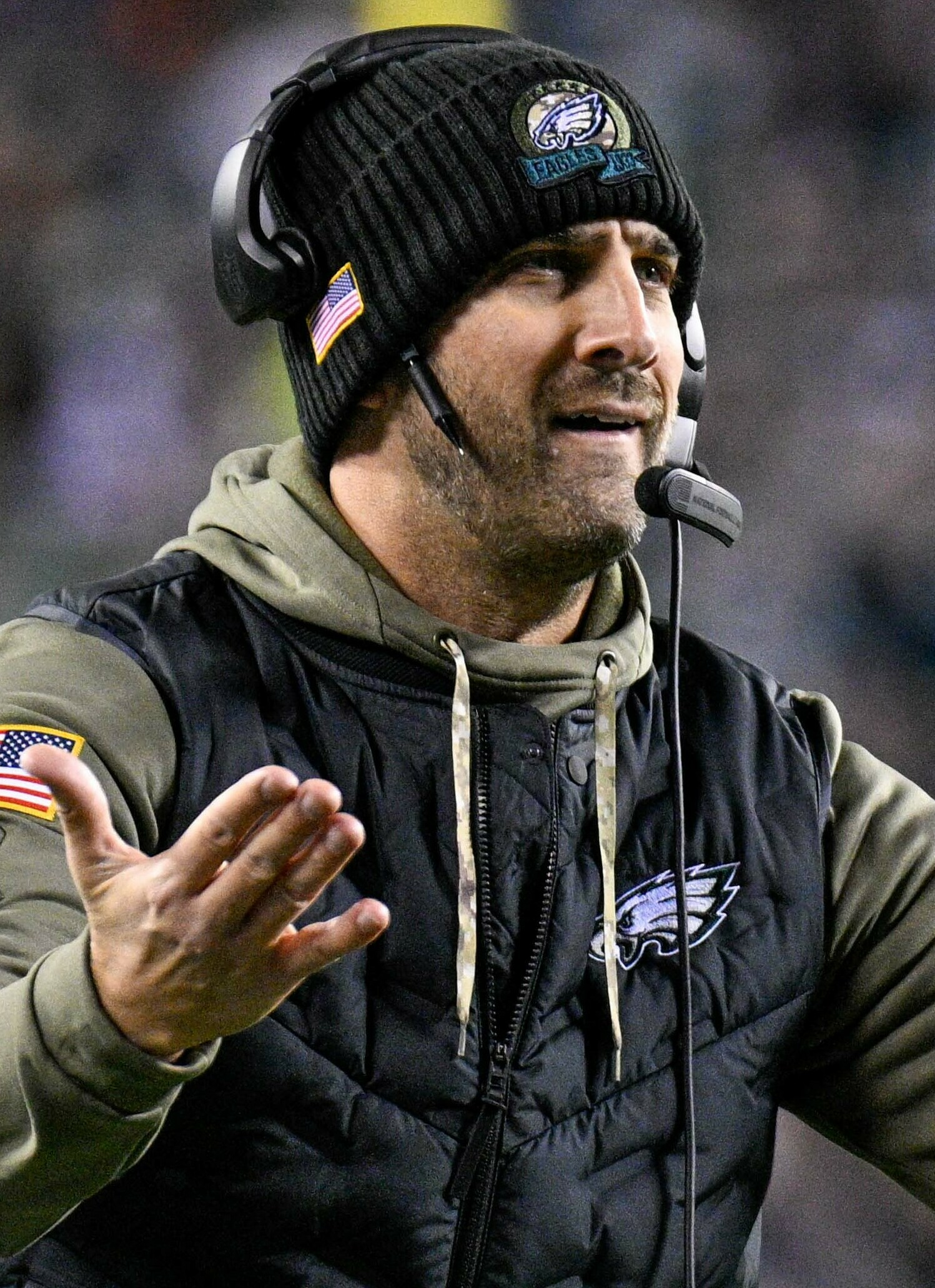
Sirianni in 2022

The Eagles compiled a 14–3 record in the regular season, earning the NFC East division championship and a first-round bye in the playoffs. The Eagles became the first team since the 1989 Minnesota Vikings to record at least 70 sacks, led the league in fewest passing yards allowed, and set a franchise record for wins and points scored in a season. One notable sideline incident occurred during a Week 11 away matchup against the Indianapolis Colts, where Sirianni had previously served as an offensive coordinator. After the Eagles narrowly defeated the Colts 17–16, Sirianni turned to a group of Eagles fans that had travelled to Lucas Oil Stadium and shouted that the win "was for Frank Reich", the coach who mentored him and who was fired as head coach of the Colts earlier that month.

During the postseason, Sirianni led the Eagles to their fourth Super Bowl in franchise history after a 38–7 Divisional Round playoff victory over the New York Giants and a 31–7 NFC Championship Game victory over the San Francisco 49ers. The Eagles lost to the Kansas City Chiefs in Super Bowl LVII by a score of 38–35.

==== 2023 season ====
During the offseason, Sirianni lost both offensive coordinator Shane Steichen and defensive coordinator Jonathan Gannon, both of whom received head coaching jobs with the Indianapolis Colts and Arizona Cardinals, respectively.

The Eagles once again compiled a 10–1 regular season record to start the season, but experienced a late season slide and finished with a 1–5 record and ultimately lost out on the NFC East Division title and the #2-seed in the NFC to the Dallas Cowboys in the last week of the season. Sirianni became the first head coach in NFL history to experience a 1–5 record to end the season and make the playoffs. The Eagles were ultimately eliminated by the Buccaneers in the Wild Card Round of the 2023 NFL Playoffs. Sirianni was widely blamed for both the offensive and defensive regression of the Eagles in 2023. In particular, Sirianni caused a significant controversy after removing defensive coordinator Sean Desai from defensive play calling and passed them onto former New England Patriots defensive coordinator and Detroit Lions head coach Matt Patricia, a move that ultimately backfired and led the Eagles to finish second to last in total defense. Sirianni ultimately fired Desai, Patricia, and offensive coordinator Brian Johnson after the 2023 season.

==== 2024 season: Super Bowl LIX victory ====
During Week 2 against the Atlanta Falcons, Sirianni was widely criticized for throwing the ball on 3rd and 3 at the Atlanta 10-yard line up 18–15, where the pass fell incomplete, giving Atlanta time to march down the field and secure the victory. The following week, despite a 15–12 victory over the New Orleans Saints, Sirianni still received criticism for his fourth down aggression. After a Week 6 home victory over the Cleveland Browns, Sirianni drew criticism for having a shouting match against the Eagles' fans in attendance behind the team's sideline. While the Eagles were on the field in victory formation, TV cameras showed that Sirianni walked behind the bench, put an index finger to his right ear then shouted words that could not be heard from afar but were interpreted as, "I can't hear you." Sirianni refused to go into any detail on what precipitated his post-game antics.

Despite early struggles and a 2–2 start, Sirianni coached the Eagles to a 14–3 record and an NFC East title, finishing as the #2-seed in the NFC. Propelled by the addition of running back Saquon Barkley and an astounding defensive turnaround from the prior season under new defensive coordinator Vic Fangio, the Eagles secured a Wild Card Round victory over the Green Bay Packers and a Divisional Round victory over the Los Angeles Rams. For the second time in his career, Sirianni won the NFC Championship Game, this time against the Washington Commanders 55–23, in which the Eagles broke an NFL record for the most points ever scored in a conference championship game en route to Super Bowl LIX.

In a Super Bowl rematch against the Chiefs, the Eagles won 40–22, giving Sirianni his first Super Bowl title as a head coach. Closing out the 2024 season, Sirianni bested a 70% win percentage over his first four seasons as an NFL head coach with the Eagles, the highest career win percentage of any active NFL head coach at the time.

==== 2025 season ====
On May 19, 2025, Sirianni and the Eagles agreed to a multi-year contract extension.

After Week 17, Sirianni controversially decided to rest his starters in the regular season finale against the Commanders despite having a path to the #2-seed with a victory and a Chicago Bears loss. However, the Eagles lost to the Commanders by a score of 24–17 and earned the #3-seed in the NFC with an 11–6 record. The Eagles would have been the #2-seed with a win since the Bears lost to the Detroit Lions. During the Wild Card Round against the 49ers, the Eagles lost 23–19, ending their hopes for a repeat. Additionally, at the end of the game, Sirianni took a timeout before a fourth and 11 that fell incomplete, sealing the game. Had Sirianni had the timeout, he would have had one more chance to get the ball back and score. That decision was criticized as well. Sirianni fired offensive coordinator Kevin Patullo after the season and replaced him with Sean Mannion, his fourth offensive coordinator change in four seasons.

== Head coaching record ==
Team	Year	Regular season					Postseason			
Team	Year	Won	Lost	Ties	Win %	Finish	Won	Lost	Win %	Result
PHI	2021	9	8	0	.529	2nd in NFC East	0	1	.000	Lost to Tampa Bay Buccaneers in NFC Wild Card Game
PHI	2022	14	3	0	.824	1st in NFC East	2	1	.667	Lost to Kansas City Chiefs in Super Bowl LVII
PHI	2023	11	6	0	.647	2nd in NFC East	0	1	.000	Lost to Tampa Bay Buccaneers in NFC Wild Card Game
PHI	2024	14	3	0	.824	1st in NFC East	4	0	1.000	Super Bowl LIX champions
PHI	2025	11	6	0	.647	1st in NFC East	0	1	.000	Lost to San Francisco 49ers in NFC Wild Card Game
PHI	2026	3	7	0	.300	TBD in NFC East				
Total		62	33	0	.653		6	4	.600	

== Coaching tree ==
Sirianni has served under seven head coaches:

- Larry Kehres, Mount Union (2004–2005)
- Lou Tepper, IUP (2006–2008)
- Todd Haley, Kansas City Chiefs (2009–2011)
- Romeo Crennel, Kansas City Chiefs (2011–2012)
- Mike McCoy, San Diego Chargers (2013–2016)
- Anthony Lynn, Los Angeles Chargers (2017)
- Frank Reich, Indianapolis Colts (2018–2020)

Three of Sirianni's coaching assistants have become head coaches in the NFL:

- Jonathan Gannon, Arizona Cardinals (2023–2025)
- Shane Steichen, Indianapolis Colts (2023–present)
- Kellen Moore, New Orleans Saints (2025–present)

== Personal life ==
Sirianni is married to Brett Ashley Sirianni with whom he has three children; they met when Nick was working for the Kansas City Chiefs. His father, Fran, and his brother, Jay, are both former head coaches of Southwestern Central High School, while his brother Mike is the head coach at Washington & Jefferson College in Washington, Pennsylvania.
