= Dave Lapham =

American football player (born 1952)

No. 62
- Position: Guard

Personal information
- Born: June 24, 1952 (age 74); Melrose, Massachusetts, U.S.
- Listed height: 6 ft 4 in (1.93 m)
- Listed weight: 259 lb (117 kg)

Career information
- High school: Wakefield Memorial (Wakefield, Massachusetts)
- College: Syracuse
- NFL draft: 1974: 3rd round, 61st overall pick

Career history
- Cincinnati Bengals (1974–1983); New Jersey Generals (1984–1985)

Awards and highlights
- Cincinnati Bengals 40th Anniversary Team; Cincinnati Bengals 50th Anniversary Team; Cincinnati Bengals Ring of Honor; Third-team All-American (1973); 2× First-team All-East (1972, 1973)

Career NFL statistics
- Games played: 140
- Games started: 105
- Fumble recoveries: 7
- Stats at Pro Football Reference

Dave Lapham (born June 24, 1952) is an American former professional football player who was a guard for the National Football League (NFL)'s Cincinnati Bengals from 1974 to 1983 and the United States Football League (USFL)'s New Jersey Generals (1984–1985). He played college football for the Syracuse Orange. During his pro career, he played all five line positions and was a key player on the 1981 Bengals squad that won the AFC championship, but ultimately lost Super Bowl XVI to the San Francisco 49ers. He has served as the Bengals radio color commentator for over 30 seasons, is also a local Bengals TV analyst and radio host, and is a Big 12 football analyst for Fox Sports Network.

== Early life ==
Lapham attended Wakefield Memorial High School in Wakefield, Massachusetts, where he was a three-year letterman and captain in basketball and football and a four-year letterman and captain in track. He is a member of the school's hall of fame.

He then attended Syracuse University's Newhouse School of Communications. At Syracuse, he lettered in three seasons and was a team captain. He played in the 1973 East–West Shrine Game, the North-South Game, the Senior Bowl and the Hula Bowl.

== Professional career ==
Lapham was selected by the Bengals in the third round of the 1974 NFL draft. He played with them until 1984, when he signed a 10-year guaranteed personal services contract with Donald Trump, the majority owner of the New Jersey Generals. Lapham called it a "... business decision for my family." Linebacker Jim LeClair, his Bengals teammate, also signed with the Generals.

== Broadcasting career ==
After his retirement, in 1986 Lapham became a Bengals broadcaster. He is the color analyst on Bengals' radio broadcasts with partner Dan Hoard handling play-by-play duties. The duo also hosts Bengals Weekly with Zac Taylor, a recap and preview television show. He also works on Fox Sports Net's broadcasts of Big 12 Conference games. Additionally, he appears as a panelist on Sports Rock, a local sports commentary program.

Lapham also did work in 1988 with the NFL on NBC, with at least one game on October 9, 1988, as the Indianapolis Colts played the Buffalo Bills, he did the color commentary with Tom Hammond doing the play by play.

Lapham has also worked with Cincinnati Bengals long-time play-by-play voices Brad Johansen, Phil Samp (the Bengals' original announcer) Ken Broo, Ohio State University play-by-play announcer Paul Keels and USC Trojans' announcer Pete Arbogast on Bengal broadcasts during the course of his tenure as color man. He is famous for urging on Bengal players with exhortations such as "come on!" and "get him!", saying "uh-oh" when a sack or interception is in the works, and calling the players by their first names.

== Personal life ==
Lapham resides in Cincinnati with his wife, Lynne. They have two grown children, Dave Jr. and Sarah. Lapham is active in the Cincinnati community and is president of the charitable foundation Charities M.D., which awards scholarships to students looking to pursue a career in healthcare.

His nephew, Richard Lapham, earned first-team accolades as a high schooler at Souhegan High School in Amherst, New Hampshire in 2005 and played offensive tackle for Boston College. His other nephew, Brian Lapham, was an All-Ivy League offensive lineman for Harvard University.
