= Trench trophy =

The Trench Trophy Logo

The Trench Trophy is an award, started in 2003, which recognizes high school football lineman in the Western New York area. The award was founded by Len Kuhn and Carl Kuras. The Trench Trophy Award, Inc. is a 501(c)(3) non-profit organization officially established in 2015.

== Award ==
Players are graded on specific criteria by a group of knowledgeable scouts, known as the Committee. The Committee is composed of coaches, former coaches, and former players, who attend the games of more than 80 schools on a weekly basis. Every week five players are chosen as "Nominees," who are then eligible for the final award. After the state championships are over, nominees are broken down to twelve Hall of Fame Inductees, and then one final winner. The "Lineman of the Year" receives a college scholarship, among other accolades.

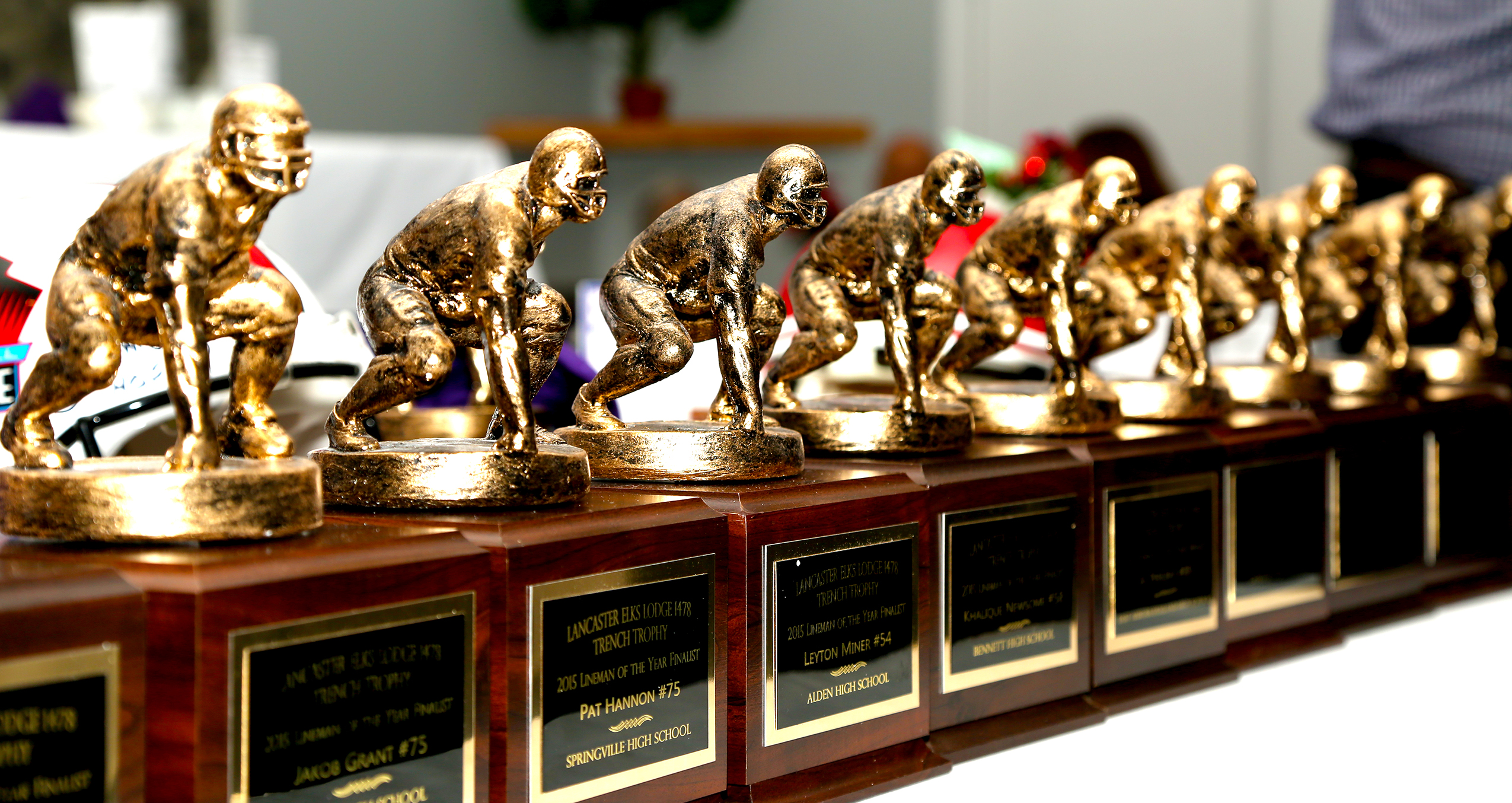

== Mission ==
The Trench Trophy Award, Inc. provides recognition to football players who predominantly play the position of offensive or defensive line for their school’s varsity, interscholastic football program. Schools include those of Section VI of the NYSPHSAA and Monsignor Martin Athletic Conference.

The specific objectives and purpose of the Trench Trophy shall be:

A. To promote sportsmanship, civic responsibility, and scholastic effort by athletes who predominantly play football.
B. To provide recognition to football linemen in Western New York state.
C. To provide opportunities for players to be discovered by local, regional, and national intercollegiate football programs.
D. To promote the growth of youth athletics, specifically the sport of football.

== John Gebhardt Memorial Scholarship ==
In August 2010, the Trench Trophy announced that their yearly college scholarship was named in honor of founding member and generous contributor John Gebhardt. The John Gebhardt Memorial Scholarship was decided by result of unanimous vote by the Committee. John was a dedicated supporter of the award since its inception.

== Name ==
The name "Trench Trophy" was approved on August 18, 2003, at the first meeting of the Trench Trophy Committee. It comes from the adage that lineman play in the "trenches."

== Current Executive Committee ==
- Ed Sciera.Chairman
- Philip Rizzi.Secretary
- Ron Kromer.Treasurer
- Rick Coburn.Trustee
- Sibby Constantino.Trustee
- Carl Ertel.Trustee
- Jim Fleischman.Trustee
- Chuck Graver.Trustee
- Len Jankiewicz.Trustee
- Bob Lemere.Trustee
- Jason Milks.Trustee
- John Owens.Trustee
- Don Sullivan.Trustee
- Paul Whelan.Trustee
- Carl Kuras.Co-Founder
- Len Kuhn.Co-Founder
- Victor Rizzi.Co-Founder
- Sal Capaccio.Special Contributor
- Joe Delamielleure.Special Contributor
- Jim McNally.Special Contributor

== Lineman of the Year Award Winners ==
Past Winners:

- 2003: John Livingston.Eden Raiders
- 2004: Jason Weber.Orchard Park Quakers
- 2005: Jesse Jesonowski.Iroquois Chiefs
- 2006: Gil Rodriguez.Frontier Falcons
- 2007: Nick Christman.Sweet Home Panthers
- 2008: John Urschel.Canisius Crusaders
- 2009: Jasen Carlson.Southwestern Trojans
- 2010: Dylan Anna.Pioneer Panthers
- 2011: Devon Leach.Orchard Park Quakers
- 2012: Ryan Hunter.Canisius Crusaders
- 2013: Jeremiah Bill.Hamburg Bulldogs
- 2014: Joe Mistretta.Jamestown Red Raiders
- 2015: Jake Fuzak.Williamsville South Billies
- 2016: Nathan Emer.Iroquois Chiefs
- 2017: Jeremiah Sanders.South Park Sparks
- 2018: Tyler Doty.St. Joe's Marauders
- 2019: Teryon Vernon.Maritime Commodores
- 2020: No Winner Due to Covid Shortened Season
- 2021: Gavin Susfolk.Canisius Crusaders
- 2022: Rashard Perry.Bennett Tigers
- 2023: Marcus Harrison.St. Francis Red Raiders
- 2024: Sam Ikegweonu.Lackawanna Steelers
- 2025: Kaius Mattoon.Clarence Red Devils

== Hall of Fame ==
Last Name	First Name	School	Year
Cammarata	Cole	Sweet Home	2024
Guerrero	Jeremiah	St. Joe's	2024
Haffa	Owen	Lancaster	2024
Harris	Michael	St. Francis	2024
Ikegweonu	Sam	Lackawanna	2024
Johnson-Bates	Limmie	McKinley	2024
Kyler	Warrick	Salamanca	2024
Lavery	Rylan	Pioneer	2024
Parker	Manny	South Park	2024
Pratton	Tommy	Jamestown	2024
Rhoades	Kolten	CSP	2024
Richardson	Ty	Pioneer	2024
Cunningham	Sheldon	Health Sciences	2023
Devereaux	Aiden	Jamestown	2023
Handley	Rayshawn	Lackawanna	2023
Hardy	Keegan	Salamanca	2023
Harrison	Marcus	St. Francis	2023
Matheis	Luke	Pioneer	2023
Mercado	Hezekiah	Kenmore West	2023
Mitchell	Roosevelt	Medina	2023
Ploetz	Isaiah	Franklinville/Ellicottville	2023
Sullivan	Pat	Canisius	2023
Taylor	Delshon	Bennett	2023
Whittaker	Cam	West Seneca West	2023
Carlsen	Tommy	Lancaster	2022
Carpenter	Ryan	Randolph	2022
Donnelly	Braeden	Iroquis	2022
Dubeck	Aiden	St. Francis	2022
Hensley	Kayden	Clarence	2022
Ikegweonu	Sunday	Lackawanna	2022
Johnson	Chris	Medina	2022
Locke	Evan	Williamsville North	2022
Miller	Balaam	St. Francis	2022
Perry	Rashard	Bennett	2022
Tan	Patrick	Amherst	2022
Walker	Dezmin	Maryvale	2022
Cecchini	Joe	Medina	2021
Coder	Alex	Pioneer	2021
Covell	Matt	Akron	2021
Delgado	Joey	Jamestown	2021
Krzyszton	Konrad	Frontier	2021
Massing	Justin	CSP	2021
McGaughy	Julian	Jamestown	2021
Murphy	Matt	Williamsville South	2021
Pearlman	Cole	Clarence	2021
Rogowski	Alex	West Seneca East	2021
Scott	Jimmy	St. Francis	2021
Susfolk	Gavin	Canisius	2021
Takacs	Andrew	Hamburg	2021
Wright	David	Maritime	2021
Bitka	Ryan	Amherst	2019
Bruce	Geno	Hamburg	2019
Mahony	Conor	Lancaster	2019
Osborn	Tim	North Tonawanda	2019
Pannes	Cooper	Southwestern	2019
Schon	Eric	St. Francis	2019
Urbaniak	A.J.	Williamsville South	2019
Vernon	Teryon	Maritime	2019
Walker	Jason	St. Joe's	2019
Williams	Jeremiah	Bennett	2019
Wilson	Cody	Albion	2019
Wolfer	Zack	Franklinville/Ellicottville	2019
Argo	Jake	Starpoint	2018
Bernard	Andrew	Randolph-Frewsburg	2018
Boyd Jr.	Stephen	Cardinal O’Hara	2018
Braswell	Greg	South Park	2018
Doty	Tyler	St. Joe's	2018
Gaca	David	Lancaster	2018
Hamme	Nick	West Seneca East	2018
Loynes	Jihad	Bennett	2018
Newcomb	George	West Seneca West	2018
Powers	Joe	Lewiston-Porter	2018
Smith	Trevor	Pioneer	2018
Smouse	Jordan	Clymer-Sherman-Panama	2018
Walter	Josh	Williamsville North	2018
Wilkes	Jeremiah	Grand Island	2018
Al-Hemyari	Manny	Cleveland Hill	2017
Andreessen	Joe	Lancaster	2017
Arrington	Sam	Cleveland Hill	2017
Bass	Terrance	Cheektowaga	2017
Calo	Jake	Lancaster	2017
Claycomb	Brad	West Seneca West	2017
Holmes	Jordon	North Tonawanda	2017
McGennis	Will	Canisius	2017
Sanders	Jeremiah	South Park	2017
Schreader	Kyle	Starpoint	2017
Whitaker	Tariq	Cheektowaga	2017
Woodarek	Walt	Franklinville/Ellicottville	2017
Black	Chauval	Dunkirk	2016
Carr-Johnson	Michael	Hutch Tech	2016
Emer	Nathan	Iroquois	2016
Grisolia	Tyler	St. Francis	2016
Hutchinson	Preston	Franklinville/Ellicottville	2016
Jones	Nick	Dunkirk	2016
Kloss	Sean	Clarence	2016
Kubik	Daniel	Orchard Park	2016
Luderman	Jacob	Lancaster	2016
Pawlowski	Nathan	Cleveland Hill	2016
White	Tyler	Kenmore West	2016
Wilkes	J.B.	Grand Island	2016
Bruenn	Greg	West Seneca East	2015
Bullock-Watson	Tristen	Hutch-Tech	2015
Fuzak	Jake	Williamsville South	2015
Grant	Jakob	Depew	2015
Hannon	Pat	Springville	2015
Miner	Leyton	Alden	2015
Newsome	Khaliqye	Bennett	2015
Perlino	AJ	East Aurora-Holland	2015
Roberson	Richard	Canisius	2015
Senn	Wesley	Randolph	2015
Stephens	Desmond	Timon-St. Jude	2015
Wray	Sam	Starpoint	2015
Attea	George	Williamsville North	2014
Baker	Chandler	Maple Grove-Chautauqua	2014
Bowers	Michael	Randolph	2014
Crawford	Keyshawn	Cleveland Hill	2014
Kelleher	Mike	Maryvale	2014
Ksiezarczyk	Evin	West Seneca East	2014
Mistretta	Joe	Jamestown	2014
Rymarczyk	Matt	Kenmore East	2014
Wheatley	T.J.	Canisius	2014
Wilson	Rob	Cheektowaga	2014
Bill	Jeremiah	Hamburg	2013
Byrne	Ryan	Bishop Timon/St. Jude	2013
Doctor	Tommy	Grand Island	2013
Hillis	Dawson	Orchard Park	2013
Lamb	Mike	Depew	2013
MacIlwain	Steven	Cleveland Hill	2013
Merlau	Ryan	Pioneer	2013
Oldro	Cody	Randolph	2013
Perry	Kevon	Burgard	2013
Stauss	Steven	Albion	2013
Zobrest	Phil	Alden	2013
Bunker	Jason	Alden	2012
Czech	John	Jamestown	2012
Haines	Cortland	Jamestown	2012
Hunter	Ryan	Canisius	2012
Murphy	Sean	Bishop Timon/St. Jude	2012
Nocek	Nick	Fredonia	2012
Senn	Michael	Orchard Park	2012
Sommerville	Khalil	Bennett	2012
Studd	Tyler	Springville	2012
Swan	Jake	Maple Grove	2012
Anderson	Nathan	Frewsburg	2011
Austin	Dan	Southwestern	2011
Bartholomew	Miles	St. Francis	2011
Burgio	Andrew	Depew	2011
Chase	Josh	Alden	2011
DiPirro	Kyle	St. Mary's	2011
Lathrop	Brandon	Kenmore West	2011
Leach	Devon	Orchard Park	2011
Morganstern	Mike	Cheektowaga	2011
Scamurra	T.J.	Williamsville South	2011
Anna	Dylan	Pioneer	2010
Bauer	Austin	Lancaster	2010
Cambria	Jack	St. Joe's	2010
Fluent	Ben	Randolph	2010
Langworthy	Pat	Southwestern	2010
NeMoyer	Thomas	Canisius	2010
Sanders	Anthony	McKinley	2010
Schiavi	Mike	Lackawanna	2010
Therrien	Todd	Williamsville East	2010
Washington	Dereon	Riverside	2010
Bigelow	Troy	Eden	2009
Carlson	Jasen	Southwestern	2009
Gallagher	Dillon	Williamsville South	2009
Harnden	Eric	Grand Island	2009
Hornung	Matt	Cheektowaga	2009
Howard	Desmond	St. Francis	2009
Marsh	Zack	Panama	2009
Mulhern	Sean	Riverside	2009
Shreve	Casey	North Tonawanda	2009
Shreve	Kyle	North Tonawanda	2009
Buck	Chris	Frontier	2008
Bunker	Ben	North Tonawanda	2008
Gens	Corey	Maple Grove	2008
Green	Reggie	Lackawanna	2008
Hairston	Curtis	Cleveland Hill	2008
Harnden	Ryan	Grand Island	2008
Kieliszek	Kevin	Lancaster	2008
Mesi	Justin	Orchard Park	2008
Phillips	Steve	Sweet Home	2008
Rohauer	Donald	Alden	2008
Smith	Mike	Grover Cleveland	2008
Urschel	John	Canisius	2008
Benson	Anthony	Grover Cleveland	2007
Eldridge	Zack	Cleveland Hill	2007
Dudkowski	Kevin	Depew	2007
Garvey	Art	East Aurora	2007
Jesonowski	Joshua	Iroquois	2007
Balcerzak	Corey	Lockport	2007
Bloom	Randy	Orchard Park	2007
Rosario	Jose	Randolph	2007
Hymes	Corey	St. Francis	2007
Christman	Nicholas	Sweet Home	2007
Hadi	Abdullah	Lackawanna	2006
Skubis	Christopher	Clarence	2006
Byrum	Carlton	Depew	2006
Rodriguez	Gil	Frontier	2006
Kakavand	Nicholas	Iroquois	2006
Apperson	Andrew	Maple Grove	2006
Appenheimer	Mike	Maryvale	2006
DePalma	Joseph	Silver Creek	2006
Steinwald	Harrison	St Joe's	2006
Eaton	Blake	Allegany-Limestone	2005
Beaver	Jeffrey	Burgard	2005
King	Justin	Grand Island	2005
Jesonowski	Jesse	Iroquois	2005
Hogg	John	McKinley	2005
Annis	Max	North Tonawanda	2005
McElwain	Tim	Randolph	2005
Papia	Jeff	St Joe's	2005
Bittner	Pete	Williamsville North	2005
Smith	Chris	St. Francis	2004
Worthington	Doug	St. Francis	2004
Brown	Tim	Burgard	2004
Rosner	Adam	Depew	2004
Coan	Steve	Frewsburg	2004
Margerum	Ian	Hamburg	2004
Port	Alex	North Tonawanda	2004
Weber	Jason	Orchard Park	2004
Miller	Matt	Portville	2004
Santiago	Adriel	South Park	2004
Langworthy	Matt	Southwestern	2004
Randle	Brandon	Burgard	2003
Amos	Ryan	Cleveland Hill	2003
Kindt	Justin	Depew	2003
Livingston	John	Eden	2003
Ingraham	Doug	Grand Island	2003
Haney	Alex	Lockport	2003
Maull	Gary	Olean	2003
Graham	Matt	Orchard Park	2003
Sickles	Andy	Randolph	2003
Freeman	Garvie	South Park	2003

== Grading Criteria ==
- Technique
- Determination
- Aggressiveness
- Intensity
- Ability to be a Team Player
- Coachability
- Consistency
- Courage
- Citizenship
- Scholastic Effort

[Size [height and/or weight] shall NOT be taken into consideration]

== See also ==
- Elks
- Lancaster (village), New York

== For More Information ==
- Trench Trophy Website
- Section 6 Website
