= Jordan Smith (pitcher) =

American baseball player (born 1986)

- Pitcher
- Born: February 4, 1986 (age 39); American Fork, Utah, U.S.
- Batted: Right Threw: Right

MLB debut
- June 15, 2010, for the Cincinnati Reds

Last MLB appearance
- May 22, 2011, for the Cincinnati Reds

MLB statistics
- Win–loss record: 3–2
- Earned run average: 4.94
- Strikeouts: 39
- Stats at Baseball Reference

Teams
- Cincinnati Reds (2010–2011)

Jordan Smith (born February 4, 1986) is a former relief pitcher. Smith is 6 ft 4 in (1.93 m), 220 pounds and bats and throws right-handed.

== Early life ==
Smith graduated from Pleasant Grove High School in Pleasant Grove, Utah. He spent one season at Salt Lake Community College, playing mostly as catcher. Due to injuries among SLCC's pitching staff, he was moved to mound and started throwing fastballs in the low 90's (mph). He also played for the Community College of Southern Nevada in Las Vegas before his professional career began. Smith's brother is Egan Smith, a left-handed pitcher who was drafted by and signed with the Toronto Blue Jays in 2009.

== Professional baseball ==
=== 2006 ===
The Reds selected Smith in the 6th round of the 2006 First-Year Player Draft with the 174th overall pick. He was signed by scout Jeff Morris. Smith started his professional career in 2006, playing for Rookie League Billings. He was a Pioneer League All-Star. His 3.01 earned run average ranked seventh among all Reds minor league pitchers; his six wins was tied for first in the Pioneer League and his ERA was sixth best. Smith did not allow a home run in his first 11 starts (57 1/3 innings).

=== 2007 ===
Smith was promoted to Class A Dayton in 2007. He was 10–8 in 26 starts for the Dragons, and allowed two earned runs or fewer in 16 of his starts. In a 30 2/3 innings stretch from April 27 to May 18, he posted a 0.88 ERA and struck out 23, with a 2–2 record. Smith had eight quality starts, allowing 0 runs in four starts combined (27 innings).

=== 2008 ===
Smith split the season with Class A-Advanced Sarasota and Double-A Chattanooga. In 21 starts combined, he went 9–8 with a 3.84 ERA. His ERA ranked eighth among all Reds minor leaguers. He earned the Reds minor league pitcher of the month for April. Smith was a Florida State League All-Star while in Sarasota. Over a 24 2/3 innings, three start stretch from April 30 to May 2; Smith pitched eight innings or more in all three, allowed three runs, and walked none. He was promoted to Chattanooga on May 25, earning an invitation to the 2009 major league spring training camp.

=== 2009 ===
Smith remained in Double-A (now the Carolina Mudcats), but only made 13 starts. He made three separate trips to the disabled list for throwing elbow and left knee injuries, and the elbow kept him out of action for the rest of the season after July 2. He still was a Southern League mid-season All-Star, and pitcher of the week for the week of 5/18 to 5/24. Smith was a non-roster invitee for big league camp, but was added to the 40-man roster on November 20, 2009, guaranteeing him an invitation.

== Major League Baseball ==
The Reds signed Smith to a one-year, $400,000 contract on March 3, 2010. Smith was promoted from Carolina to the Cincinnati Reds on June 15. He was optioned to Triple-A Louisville, but returned to the Reds as a September call-up. Smith did not make the Reds 25-man post season roster, but is an eligible reserve.

In 2 years with the Reds, Smith went 3–2 with a 4.94 ERA with 62 innings and 39 strikeouts in 54 games. On November 3, 2012, Smith signed a minor league deal with the Miami Marlins with an invitation to spring training. On July 4, 2013, he was released.
