= Mark Berry (baseball) =

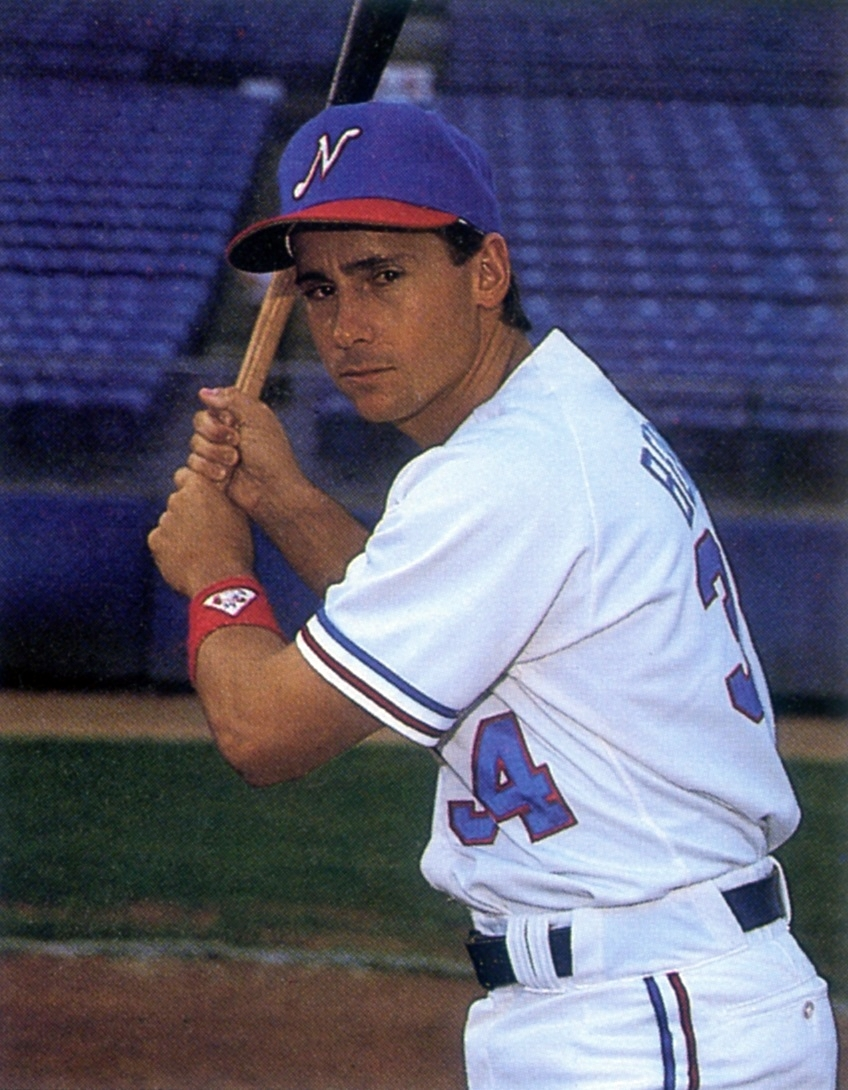
- Berry with the Nashville Sounds in 1987
- Coach
- Born: September 22, 1962 (age 62); Oxnard, California, U.S.
- Bats: Right Throws: Right

Teams
- Cincinnati Reds (2003–2013)

Mark Berry (born September 22, 1962) is an American former professional baseball coach in Major League Baseball (MLB). He served as the third base coach for the Cincinnati Reds and has spent 27 seasons in the Reds organization as a player, coach, and manager.

== Early life ==
Berry graduated from Hueneme High School in Oxnard, California in 1981. He played college baseball at Oxnard Junior College and the University of Arkansas.

== Playing career ==
The Reds selected Berry in the 6th round of the 1984 draft with the 137th overall pick. He was signed by baseball scout Bill Clark. In his seven seasons as a Reds minor leaguer he, predominantly, played catcher, but also played first base, third base, nine games in the outfield, and one game at shortstop. He was a Pioneer League All-Star catcher in his first season in 1984, then was the Most Valuable Player for the Tampa Tarpons in 1986 and was ranked the organization's eight-best prospect in 1985 and 1987. He retired as a player in 1990.

== Coaching career ==
=== Minor leagues ===
When Berry retired as a player from the Charleston Wheelers, he stayed with the team as a coach. A month later, he went from Charleston to Plant City of the Gulf Coast League as a coach. He spent the 1991 season as the pitching coach for the Cedar Rapids Reds. The following year he managed the Cedar Rapids Reds to a Midwest League championship title. In 1993, he managed the Winston-Salem Spirit to the Carolina League title.

In 1996, Berry began his managerial tenure for the Chattanooga Lookouts, the Double-A affiliate of the Reds. The team won the division in his first season, earning him the Southern League Manager of the Year award. In 1997, he was named the Southern League's Best Managerial Prospect by Baseball America. He managed the Lookouts until 1998. He finished his minor league managerial career with a 506-463 record (.522), two league championships, three division titles, and made the post-season four of his seven seasons.

=== Major leagues ===
Berry reported to spring training in 1999 scheduled to be the hitting coach for class-AAA Indianapolis Indians, but remained with Cincinnati as the bullpen catcher. He remained the bullpen catcher until July 28, 2003, when he was named the Reds bench coach. The following offseason Berry was named third base coach. As well as being the Reds third base coach, Berry was also the spring training and regular season daily coordinator for the Reds.
