= Jim Kelch =

American sportscaster

Jim Kelch is an American sportscaster who worked for the Cincinnati Reds Radio Network from 2008 to 2017. He currently serves as the play-by-play announcer for Northern Kentucky University men's basketball and for Reds Triple-A affiliate Louisville Bats, which he also covered from 1989 to 2009.

Prior to joining the Reds broadcast team, Kelch also called games for the Peoria Chiefs, Chattanooga Lookouts, Chattanooga Mocs men's basketball, NCAA Division II men's basketball semifinal championships, Louisville Cardinals football, men's basketball, women's basketball, Bellarmine University, and called the 2009 NCAA Women's national championship game. Kelch is a graduate of Bradley University. Joining Kelch on the broadcast team for the Reds were Marty Brennaman, Thom Brennaman, Chris Welsh, George Grande, and, occasionally, Sean Casey.

His contract with the Reds was not renewed for the 2018 season.
