= Brad Johansen =

American sports announcer

Bradley William Johansen (born June 3, 1962) is a longtime news and sports anchor in Ohio, most recently serving the evening news anchor and reporter for WCMH-TV in Columbus, Ohio from 2020-23.

From 1996 to 2014, he was the sports director at WKRC-TV in Cincinnati, Ohio, where he also called Cincinnati Bengals pre-season games. In 2000, Brad moved to the radio booth, replacing Pete Arbogast, who is the voice of the USC Trojans' football and women's basketball programs. Johansen was succeeded in 2011 by Dan Hoard.

In 2014, Johansen moved on from being the sports director and a play-by-play announcer for CBS Sports Network to anchoring the 4:00 and 5:30 pm newscasts at WKRC.

In April 2018, Johansen left WKRC-TV to join WRAL-TV in Raleigh, North Carolina as an evening news anchor and reporter. He was let go Thursday, April 4, 2019 after one year at the station.

On March 6, 2020, Johansen returned to television, as an early evening news anchor and reporter for WCMH. He left the station in the spring of 2023 to move back to Cincinnati.

He has been married to his wife, Colleen M. (McDonell) Johansen since December 28, 1998. He was previously married to Susan M. (Panczak).
