= Paul Keels =

American sportscaster

Paul Keels is the current play-by-play announcer for Ohio State University's football and men's basketball teams for WBNS Radio and the Ohio State Sports Network.

A native of Cincinnati, Keels began his broadcasting career in his hometown as a news anchor/reporter for WLW Radio in 1979. The following year, he moved to Detroit to work for WJR Radio to call games for the NBA Detroit Pistons (1980–1981), and then to WWJ Radio to call football and basketball for the University of Michigan from 1981–1987.

Following a year at UPI Radio Network in Washington DC, Keels returned to Cincinnati in 1988 to become the voice of the University of Cincinnati Bearcats and host a sports talk show on WCKY-AM. From 1992–1995, he hosted a morning news show on WHIO Radio in Dayton. In 1994, he again became play-by-play voice for the University of Cincinnati. In 1996, he started to do play-by-play duties for the Bengals. Following the 1996 football season, WLW's parent company, Jacor Communications, lost the rights to the Bengals, and Keels continued broadcasting football and basketball for the University of Cincinnati. He joined WBNS radio and the Ohio State Buckeyes Radio Network in 1998.

Keels also worked for the Cincinnati Bengals as a preseason announcer on WKRC-TV from 2000–2010, and worked on the Cincinnati Reds television broadcasts for Fox Sports Ohio in 2010. He is also the author of Tales from the Buckeye Championship Season, which recounts the Buckeyes' 2002 National Championship run.

On November 5, 2023, Keels substituted as a radio play-by-play announcer for the Cleveland Browns.

== Awards and honors ==
- Five-time NSMA Ohio Broadcaster of the Year (2007 - shared with Marty Brennaman, 2010, 2011, 2012, 2021)
- Ohio Broadcasters Hall of Fame Inductee (class of 2007)

== Personal life ==
Keels graduated from Moeller High School in Cincinnati, and studied communications at Xavier University.
