= Lakewood, New York =

- Village
- Location within the state of New York
- Coordinates: 42°6′3″N 79°19′19″W
- Country: United States
- State: New York
- County: Chautauqua
- Town: Busti

Area
  - Total: 1.96 sq mi (5.08 km^{2})
  - Land: 1.96 sq mi (5.08 km^{2})
  - Water: 0 sq mi (0.00 km^{2})
- Elevation: 1,325 ft (404 m)

Population (2020)
  - Total: 3,002
  - Density: 1,531.6/sq mi (591.37/km^{2})
- Time zone: UTC-5 (Eastern (EST))
  - Summer (DST): UTC-4 (EDT)
- ZIP code: 14750
- Area code: 716
- FIPS code: 36-41069
- GNIS feature ID: 0954993
- Website: www.lakewoodny.gov

Lakewood is a village in Chautauqua County, New York, United States. The population was 2,993 at the 2020 census. The village is in the northern part of the town of Busti.

== Geography ==
Lakewood is located at 42°6′3″N 79°19′19″W (42.100989, -79.321919), at the south end of Chautauqua Lake. New York State Route 394 passes through the village as Fairmount Avenue, leading east 5 miles (8 km) to the center of Jamestown and northwest 6 miles (10 km) to Interstate 86 where it crosses Chautauqua Lake.

According to the United States Census Bureau, the village has a total area of 2.0 square miles (5.1 km^{2}), all land.

== Demographics ==
Historical population
Census	Pop.	Note	%±
1900	574		—
1910	564		−1.7%
1920	714		26.6%
1930	1,837		157.3%
1940	2,314		26.0%
1950	3,013		30.2%
1960	3,933		30.5%
1970	3,864		−1.8%
1980	3,941		2.0%
1990	3,564		−9.6%
2000	3,258		−8.6%
2010	3,002		−7.9%
2020	3,002		0.0%
2021 (est.)	2,973	▼	−1.0%
U.S. Decennial Census

=== 2020 census ===
As of the 2020 census, Lakewood had a population of 3,002. The median age was 47.5 years. 18.6% of residents were under the age of 18 and 25.6% of residents were 65 years of age or older. For every 100 females, there were 91.7 males, and for every 100 females age 18 and over, there were 86.3 males age 18 and over.

99.3% of residents lived in urban areas, while 0.7% lived in rural areas.

There were 1,351 households in Lakewood, of which 21.4% had children under the age of 18 living in them. Of all households, 43.2% were married-couple households, 19.0% were households with a male householder and no spouse or partner present, and 30.1% were households with a female householder and no spouse or partner present. About 37.5% of all households were made up of individuals, and 20.3% had someone living alone who was 65 years of age or older.

There were 1,707 housing units, of which 20.9% were vacant. The homeowner vacancy rate was 2.8% and the rental vacancy rate was 16.0%.

Racial composition as of the 2020 census
Race	Number	Percent
White	2,701	90.0%
Black or African American	22	0.7%
American Indian and Alaska Native	16	0.5%
Asian	83	2.8%
Native Hawaiian and Other Pacific Islander	0	0.0%
Some other race	25	0.8%
Two or more races	155	5.2%
Hispanic or Latino (of any race)	88	2.9%

=== 2000 census ===
As of the 2000 census, there were 3,258 people, 1,474 households, and 909 families residing in the village. The population density was 1,656.8 inhabitants per square mile (639.7/km^{2}). There were 1,731 housing units at an average density of 880.3 per square mile (339.9/km^{2}). The racial makeup of the village was 97.51% White, 0.71% African American, 0.06% Native American, 0.68% Asian, 0.37% from other races, and 0.68% from two or more races. Hispanic or Latino of any race were 0.77% of the population.

There were 1,474 households, out of which 25.7% had children under the age of 18 living with them, 49.5% were married couples living together, 9.2% had a female householder with no husband present, and 38.3% were non-families. 34.3% of all households were made up of individuals, and 18.0% had someone living alone who was 65 years of age or older. The average household size was 2.21 and the average family size was 2.84.

In the village, the population was spread out, with 22.1% under the age of 18, 5.8% from 18 to 24, 24.9% from 25 to 44, 27.3% from 45 to 64, and 19.8% who were 65 years of age or older. The median age was 43 years. For every 100 females, there were 88.0 males. For every 100 females age 18 and over, there were 83.1 males.

The median income for a household in the village was $40,364, and the median income for a family was $51,615. Males had a median income of $40,794 versus $26,829 for females. The per capita income for the village was $24,566. About 3.5% of families and 5.5% of the population were below the poverty line, including 7.2% of those under age 18 and 4.1% of those age 65 or over.

== Local government ==
The village police force covers all of Lakewood and is contracted to cover the entire town of Busti as well. The police department often is sent to outlying areas due to little police coverage by the county sheriff's department.

The Village of Lakewood Fire Department, led by elected Fire Chief Kurt Hallberg, provides fire/EMS protection. The fire department covers the village and is contracted to cover parts of the town of Busti and a small part of North Harmony. The Lakewood Fire Department is one of the busiest departments in the entire county.

Other municipal operations in the village include a department of public works, responsibilities of which include garbage pick-up, plowing snow, mowing parks, public water, and some other services.

The ZIP code for Lakewood is 14750.

== Factories ==
- Cummins - located on Baker St Ext.
- Matco Tools - located on Chautauqua Ave.
- Southern Tier Brewing Company - located on Stoneman Circle
- Premier Metalworks (formerly Lexington Diecast)- located on Winchester Rd.
- Chautauqua Metal Finishing - located on Gleason Rd.
- Classic Brass - located in Stoneman Industrial Park.
- Ulrich Corporation - located on Fourth Ave

== Shopping ==
In recent years Lakewood's retail district has been growing. This retail district runs along Route 394 (Fairmount Avenue). Route 394 runs through Lakewood, parallel to Chautauqua Lake. The retail district is on the eastern side of Lakewood which is closer to Jamestown. The retail district serves much of the southern half of Chautauqua County; most of the Jamestown area's big-box stores are located in the retail district, which sprawls eastward into the space between Jamestown and Lakewood. The retail district of Lakewood also holds a mall, the Chautauqua Mall. There is another smaller section of Lakewood which is known as the Village Center and Historical District. This area also includes many small businesses and a clock tower.

== Dissolution attempt ==
A proposal for dissolution of the village of Lakewood into the town of Busti was placed before the voters of the village on August 25, 2010. The proposal was defeated, with 849 votes opposed compared to 353 in favor.
