= Jamestown West, New York =

Jamestown West
- Census-designated place
- Location within New York Location within the United States
- Coordinates: 42°5′36″N 79°16′39″W
- Country: United States
- State: New York
- County: Chautauqua
- Town: Ellicott

Area
  - Total: 2.52 sq mi (6.53 km^{2})
  - Land: 2.52 sq mi (6.53 km^{2})
  - Water: 0 sq mi (0.00 km^{2})
- Elevation: 1,457 ft (444 m)

Population (2020)
  - Total: 2,652
  - Density: 1,052.4/sq mi (406.32/km^{2})
- Time zone: UTC-5 (Eastern (EST))
  - Summer (DST): UTC-4 (EDT)
- ZIP Code: 14701 (Jamestown)
- FIPS code: 36-38275

Jamestown West is a census-designated place (CDP) located near Jamestown in Chautauqua County, New York, United States. Also known as West Ellicott because of its location in the Town of Ellicott, Jamestown West had a population of 2,652 as of the 2020 census.

Jamestown West is located in a nook between the city of Jamestown and the villages of Celoron and Lakewood. It is a substantial retail center in the county, serving as the location of several of the area's big-box stores that stretch along Fairmount Avenue.

== Geography ==
Jamestown West is located at 42°05′36″N 79°16′39″W.

According to the United States Census Bureau, the CDP has a total area of 2.5 square miles (6.5 km^{2}), all land.

== Demographics ==
Historical population
Census	Pop.	Note	%±
2000	2,535		—
2010	2,408		−5.0%
2020	2,652		10.1%
U.S. Decennial Census

=== 2020 census ===
As of the 2020 census, Jamestown West had a population of 2,652. The median age was 54.0 years. 17.0% of residents were under the age of 18 and 33.9% of residents were 65 years of age or older. For every 100 females there were 89.0 males, and for every 100 females age 18 and over there were 84.2 males age 18 and over.

84.3% of residents lived in urban areas, while 15.7% lived in rural areas.

There were 1,106 households in Jamestown West, of which 22.6% had children under the age of 18 living in them. Of all households, 46.7% were married-couple households, 17.3% were households with a male householder and no spouse or partner present, and 27.7% were households with a female householder and no spouse or partner present. About 31.9% of all households were made up of individuals and 16.8% had someone living alone who was 65 years of age or older.

There were 1,208 housing units, of which 8.4% were vacant. The homeowner vacancy rate was 1.4% and the rental vacancy rate was 4.7%.

Racial composition as of the 2020 census
Race	Number	Percent
White	2,421	91.3%
Black or African American	35	1.3%
American Indian and Alaska Native	4	0.2%
Asian	43	1.6%
Native Hawaiian and Other Pacific Islander	0	0.0%
Some other race	12	0.5%
Two or more races	137	5.2%
Hispanic or Latino (of any race)	80	3.0%

=== 2000 census ===
As of the 2000 census, there were 2,535 people, 1,015 households, and 687 families residing in the CDP. The population density was 1,009.4 inhabitants per square mile (389.7/km^{2}). There were 1,061 housing units at an average density of 422.5 per square mile (163.1/km^{2}). The racial makeup of the CDP was 98.54% White, 0.24% African American, 0.16% Native American, 0.47% Asian, 0.12% from other races, and 0.47% from two or more races. Hispanic or Latino of any race were 0.67% of the population.

There were 1,015 households, out of which 27.4% had children under the age of 18 living with them, 58.3% were married couples living together, 7.0% had a female householder with no husband present, and 32.3% were non-families. 28.4% of all households were made up of individuals, and 15.9% had someone living alone who was 65 years of age or older. The average household size was 2.35 and the average family size was 2.89.

In the CDP, the population was spread out, with 21.6% under the age of 18, 4.4% from 18 to 24, 22.3% from 25 to 44, 26.3% from 45 to 64, and 25.4% who were 65 years of age or older. The median age was 46 years. For every 100 females, there were 88.3 males. For every 100 females age 18 and over, there were 82.4 males.

The median income for a household in the CDP was $41,544, and the median income for a family was $52,688. Males had a median income of $41,633 versus $22,250 for females. The per capita income for the CDP was $21,401. About 3.7% of families and 7.2% of the population were below the poverty line, including 14.7% of those under age 18 and 3.4% of those age 65 or over.

== In popular culture ==
Fictional character Lucy Ricardo, the lead character in I Love Lucy, was said to be from West Jamestown. Actress Lucille Ball, who portrayed the character, was born in Jamestown and spent most of her childhood in Celoron, both communities that are adjacent to Jamestown West.
