= 2010 New York Mets season =

2010 New York Mets
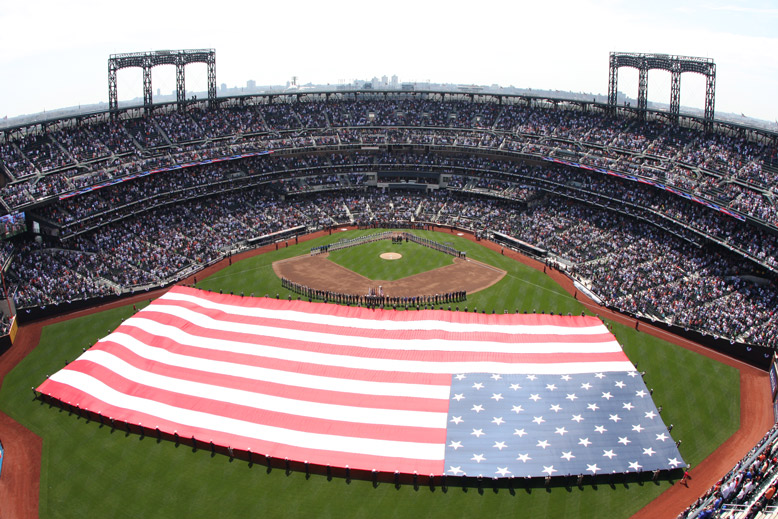
- Citi Field on Opening Day in 2010
- League: National League
- Division: East
- Ballpark: Citi Field
- City: New York, New York
- Record: 79–83 (.488)
- Divisional place: 4th
- Owners: Fred Wilpon
- General manager: Omar Minaya
- Manager: Jerry Manuel
- Television: SportsNet New York; WPIX (CW affiliate)
- Radio: WFAN (English); WQBU-FM (Spanish)

The 2010 New York Mets season was the franchise's 49th season and their second at Citi Field. The team was attempting to rebound from the injury plagued 2009 season as they sought their first postseason appearance since 2006. However, they failed in their goal, earning a 79–83 record and second consecutive fourth-place finish in the National League East, leading to the firing of manager Jerry Manuel and the dismissal of general manager Omar Minaya at the conclusion of the season.

== Offseason ==
On November 6, 2009, the Mets declined to exercise relief pitcher J. J. Putz's 2010 team option, who subsequently signed with the Chicago White Sox. Catcher Brian Schneider and shortstop Wilson Valdez signed contracts to the Philadelphia Phillies. Nelson Figueroa would also later join the Phillies on Opening Day upon being acquired off waivers from the Mets. On November 30, 2009, the Mets re-signed Alex Cora to an identical one-year, $2 million deal. They also signed former Padres catcher Henry Blanco and former Astro Chris Coste. In December 2009, the Mets signed pitchers Ryota Igarashi and Kelvim Escobar.

On December 29, the Mets signed outfielder Jason Bay to a four-year, $65 million deal. On January 5, 2010, the Mets signed pitcher R. A. Dickey to a minor league contract. On January 13, Carlos Beltrán underwent knee surgery, and did not return until after the All-Star break. On January 22, The Mets acquired outfielder Gary Matthews Jr. along with $21 million of the $23.5 million he was due of the last two years of his contract from the Los Angeles Angels of Anaheim in exchange for relief pitcher Brian Stokes.

On February 10, the Mets re-signed former member Mike Jacobs to a minor league deal and invited him to spring training. The Mets also continued this offseason's trend of signing catchers by finalizing a one-year, $1 million deal with catcher Rod Barajas on February 24. The Mets later invited Raúl Valdés to spring training during March. He'd eventually make it on the roster in early April after Sean Green was placed on the disabled list.

On March 11, the Mets announced that starting shortstop José Reyes would miss 2–8 weeks after being diagnosed with a hyperthyroid problem, but on March 24, the Mets announced that he would return for camp that same day and would be ready for the first weekend series against the Washington Nationals.

== Regular season ==
=== April ===
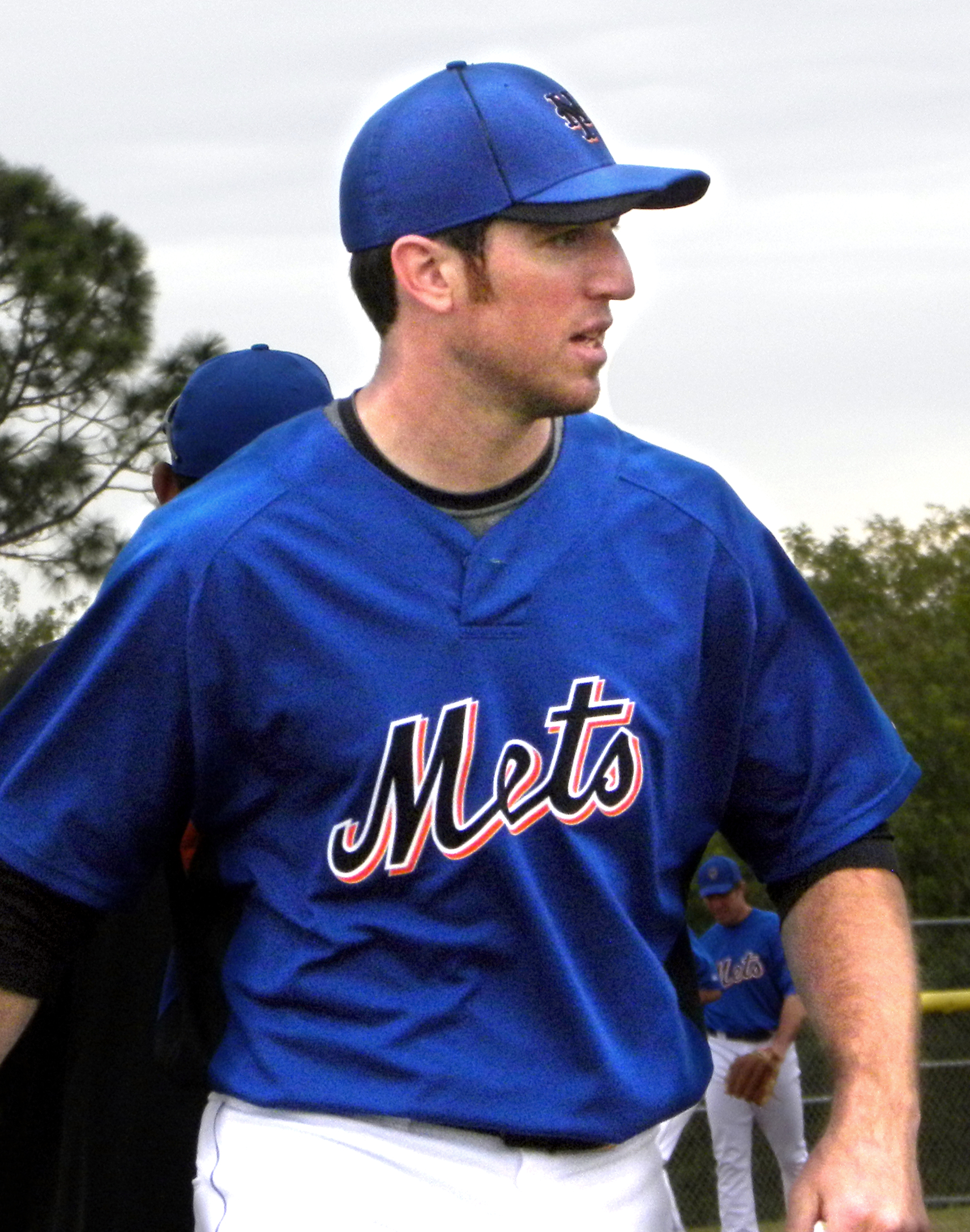
Davis with the Mets in 2010

The Mets opened their season at Citi Field with a 7–1 victory over the Florida Marlins. After a shaky 4–8 start and questions surrounding the lineup, they called up highly touted prospect Ike Davis. The call-up and the surprising emergence of starting pitcher Mike Pelfrey who ended the month 4–0, with a NL leading 0.69 ERA along with the rest of the pitching staff, resulted in positive momentum for the Mets. They went 9–1 on a ten-game homestand, having done that twice in their history. They finished the homestand with an overall record of 13–9 and leading the NL East by a ½ game over the Philadelphia Phillies. The Mets wrapped up the month with a 9–1 win over the Phillies, giving them a 14–9 record and a 1½ game lead in the East.

=== May ===
The Mets followed their successful April by slumping to a 12–17 finish in May. However, after starting the month 6–14, the team's fortunes appeared to turn around beginning with a 5–3 victory over their crosstown rival New York Yankees on May 22. The Mets went on to win their three-game series against the Yankees, and followed it up with a three-game sweep of their NL East rivals, the first place Philadelphia Phillies. The series, in which the Mets shut the Phillies out in all three games, marked the first time the Mets had shut out a team three days in a row since 1969—when the Mets shut out the Phillies three games in a row in September. It was also only the third time since 1876 that a first place team was shut out in all games of a sweep. The Mets finished 12–17 in May and an even 26–26 overall, having gone 6–4 from May 20 onward.

=== June ===
The Mets had a strong June, continuing their winning ways at Citi Field with a nine-game home winning streak extending from May. The team finally won a series on the road, compiling a 7–2 record from June 11–20, sweeping the Baltimore Orioles and Cleveland Indians before losing two of three against the Yankees in Yankee Stadium. The Mets' resurgence was due in part to R. A. Dickey, Hisanori Takahashi and Jon Niese bolstering the starting rotation as well as José Reyes and David Wright emerging from their early season struggles to lead the team's offense. The Mets finished June 18–8, 1½ games behind the Atlanta Braves for the NL East lead and holding the NL Wild Card lead.

=== July and August ===
The Mets went into July in second place behind the Atlanta Braves. In the final series before the All-Star break, which began with the Mets just three games out of first, the Mets lost two of three to the Braves, dropping them to four games back. They never recovered, struggling for the rest of July, culminating with a 2–9 West Coast road trip, including a sweep at the hands of the last-place Arizona Diamondbacks. Their season spiraled downward further when in August, Francisco Rodríguez beat up his father-in-law in front of the other players' family. In the process, Rodriguez tore a ligament in his hand and, needing surgery, his season was ended. As a result, the Mets began the process of trying to void his contract, and placed him on the disqualified list, not paying him for the remainder of the season. Jason Bay also suffered a concussion that he would never return from. Jeff Francoeur was traded to the Texas Rangers as August came to an end.

=== September and October ===
The Mets were eliminated from playoff contention on September 21 after a 5–2 loss to the Florida Marlins. The season ended when Óliver Pérez earned his fifth loss of the season by hitting a batter then issuing three straight walks in the 14th inning against the Washington Nationals. The Mets lost the game 2–1, finishing the season with a 79–83 record and 4th place in the NL East.

Despite finishing 79–83, the Mets outscored their opponents over the course of the season, 656 runs to 652. Their Pythagorean winning percentage, a formula that estimates expected wins based on runs scored and allowed, projected an 81–81 record.

=== Game log ===
2010 game log
April (14–9)

#	Date	Opponent	Score	Win	Loss	Save	Attendance	Record	Box
1	April 5	Marlins	7–1	**Santana** (1–0)	Johnson (0–1)	—	41,245	1–0	Box
2	April 7	Marlins	6–7 (10)	Núñez (1–0)	**Takahashi** (0–1)	Wood (1)	38,863	1–1	Box
3	April 8	Marlins	1–3	Robertson (1–0)	**Niese** (0–1)	Núñez (1)	25,982	1–2	Box
4	April 9	Nationals	8–2	**Pelfrey** (1–0)	Batista (0–1)	—	28,055	2–2	Box
5	April 10	Nationals	3–4	Lannan (1–1)	**Pérez** (0–1)	Capps (2)	33,044	2–3	Box
6	April 11	Nationals	2–5	Hernández (1–0)	**Santana** (1–1)	Capps (3)	33,672	2–4	Box
7	April 13	@ Rockies	3–11	Smith (1–1)	**Maine** (0–1)	—	25,110	2–5	Box
8	April 14	@ Rockies	5–6 (10)	Flores (1–0)	**Mejía** (0–1)	—	26,310	2–6	Box
9	April 15	@ Rockies	5–0	**Pelfrey** (2–0)	de la Rosa (1–1)	—	26,195	3–6	Box
10	April 16	@ Cardinals	3–4	Carpenter (2–0)	**Nieve** (0–1)	Franklin (4)	40,101	3–7	Box
11	April 17	@ Cardinals	2–1 (20)	**Rodríguez** (1–0)	Mather (0–1)	**Pelfrey** (1)	43,709	4–7	Box
12	April 18	@ Cardinals	3–5	Wainwright (3–0)	**Stoner** (0–1)	—	40,007	4–8	Box
13	April 19	Cubs	6–1	**Nieve** (1–1)	Russell (0–1)	—	27,940	5–8	Box
14	April 20	Cubs	4–0	**Pelfrey** (3–0)	Zambrano (1–2)	—	27,502	6–8	Box
15	April 21	Cubs	3–9	Silva (2–0)	**Pérez** (0–2)	—	25,684	6–9	Box
16	April 22	Cubs	5–2	**Santana** (2–1)	Gorzelanny (0–2)	**Rodríguez** (1)	28,535	7–9	Box
17	April 23	Braves	5–2	**Takahashi** (1–1)	Kawakami (0–3)	**Rodríguez** (2)	32,265	8–9	Box
18	April 24	Braves	3–1	**Acosta** (1–0)	Jurrjens (0–2)	**Rodríguez** (3)	36,547	9–9	Box
19	April 25	Braves	1–0 (6)	**Pelfrey** (4–0)	Hanson (1–2)	—	27,623	10–9	Box
—	April 26	Dodgers	Game Postponed						
20	April 27	Dodgers	4–0	**Santana** (3–1)	Kuroda (2–1)	—		11–9	Box
21	April 27	Dodgers	10–5	**Takahashi** (2–1)	Haeger (0–3)	—	32,012	12–9	Box
22	April 28	Dodgers	7–3	**Maine** (1–1)	Ely (0–1)	—	29,724	13-9	Box
23	April 30	@ Phillies	9–1	**Niese** (1–1)	Kendrick (0–1)	—	45,296	14–9	Box

May (12–17)

#	Date	Opponent	Score	Win	Loss	Save	Attendance	Record	Box
24	May 1	@ Phillies	0–10	Halladay (5–1)	**Pelfrey** (4–1)	—	45,264	14–10	Box
25	May 2	@ Phillies	5–11	Moyer (3–2)	**Santana** (3–2)	—	45,439	14–11	Box
26	May 3	@ Reds	2–3 (11)	Masset (3–1)	**Acosta** (1–1)	—	14,350	14–12	Box
27	May 4	@ Reds	5–4	**Feliciano** (1–0)	Cordero (1–2)	**Rodríguez** (4)	13,813	15–12	Box
28	May 5	@ Reds	4–5 (10)	Owings (3–0)	**Feliciano** (1–1)	—	16,798	15–13	Box
29	May 7	Giants	6–4	**Rodríguez** (2–0)	Romo (0–3)	—	34,681	16–13	Box
30	May 8	Giants	5–4 (11)	**Takahashi** (3–1)	Mota (0–1)	—	36,764	17–13	Box
31	May 9	Giants	5–6	Romo (1–3)	**Mejía** (0–2)	Wilson (7)	35,641	17–14	Box
32	May 10	Nationals	2– 3	Atilano (3-0)	**Maine** (1–2)	Batista (1)	29,313	17–15	Box
33	May 11	Nationals	8–6	**Valdés** (1–0)	Clippard (6–1)	**Rodríguez** (5)	31,606	18–15	Box
34	May 12	Nationals	4–6	Clippard (7–1)	**Rodríguez** (2–1)	Capps (14)	33,024	18–16	Box
35	May 13	@ Marlins	1–2	Núñez (2–0)	**Nieve** (1–2)	—	16,229	18–17	Box
36	May 14	@ Marlins	2–7	Sánchez (2–2)	**Pérez** (0–3)	—	21,221	18–18	Box
37	May 15	@ Marlins	5–7	Robertson (4–3)	**Maine** (1–3)	Núñez (8)	26,007	18–19	Box
38	May 16	@ Marlins	8–10	Nolasco (4–2)	**Niese** (1–2)	Núñez (9)	17,977	18–20	Box
39	May 17	@ Braves	3–2	**Pelfrey** (5–1)	Lowe (5–4)	**Rodríguez** (6)	21,086	19–20	Box
40	May 18	@ Braves	2–3	Wagner (3–0)	**Feliciano** (1–2)	—	27,119	19–21	Box
41	May 19	@ Nationals	3–5	Storen (1–0)	**Valdés**(1–1)	Capps (15)	19,384	19–22	Box
42	May 20	@ Nationals	10–7	**Valdés** (2–1)	Atilano (3–1)	—	23,612	20–22	Box
43	May 21	Yankees	1–2	Vázquez (3–4)	**Dessens** (0–1)	Rivera (8)	41,382	20–23	Box
44	May 22	Yankees	5–3	**Pelfrey** (6–1)	Hughes (5–1)	**Rodríguez** (7)	41,343	21–23	Box
45	May 23	Yankees	6–4	**Santana** (4–2)	Sabathia (4–3)	**Rodríguez** (8)	41,422	22–23	Box
46	May 25	Phillies	8–0	**Dickey** (1–0)	Moyer (5–4)	**Valdés** (1)	33,026	23–23	Box
47	May 26	Phillies	5–0	**Takahashi** (4–1)	Blanton (1–3)	—	33,223	24–23	Box
48	May 27	Phillies	3–0	**Pelfrey** (7–1)	Hamels (5–3)	**Rodríguez** (9)	35,903	25–23	Box
49	May 28	@ Brewers	0–2	Gallardo (5–2)	**Igarashi** (0–1)	—	32,773	25–24	Box
50	May 29	@ Brewers	6–8	Coffey (2–1)	**Nieve** (1–3)	Axford (2)	37,841	25–25	Box
51	May 30	@ Brewers	10–4	**Dickey** (2–0)	Suppan (0–2)	—	36,559	26–25	Box
52	May 31	@ Padres	6–18	Correia (5-4)	**Takahashi** (4–2)	—	20,023	26–26	Box

June (18–8)

#	Date	Opponent	Score	Win	Loss	Save	Attendance	Record	Box
53	June 1	@ Padres	4–2	**Pelfrey** (8-1)	LeBlanc (2-4)	**Rodríguez** (10)	17,393	27–26	Box
54	June 2	@ Padres	1–5 (11)	Webb (2–1)	**Valdés** (2–2)	—	15,880	27–27	Box
55	June 4	Marlins	4–3	**Dickey** (3–0)	Sánchez (5–3)	**Rodríguez** (11)	30,042	28–27	Box
56	June 5	Marlins	6–1	**Niese** (2–2)	Robertson (4–5)	—	37,165	29–27	Box
57	June 6	Marlins	7–6	**Feliciano** (2–2)	Hensley (1–2)	**Rodríguez** (12)	36,612	30–27	Box
58	June 8	Padres	2–1 (11)	**Dessens** (1–1)	Mujica (2–1)	—	30,086	31–27	Box
—	June 9	Padres	Game Postponed						
59	June 10	Padres	2–4	Latos (6–4)	**Santana** (4–3)	Bell (17)	32,365	31–28	Box
60	June 10	Padres	3–0	**Niese** (3–2)	Garland (6–4)	—	28,072	32–28	Box
61	June 11	@ Orioles	5–1	**Dickey** (4–0)	Guthrie (3–7)	—	28,554	33–28	Box
62	June 12	@ Orioles	3–1	**Takahashi** (5–2)	Matusz (2–7)	**Rodríguez** (13)	42,248	34–28	Box
63	June 13	@ Orioles	11–4	**Pelfrey** (9–1)	Millwood (0–8)	—	24,848	35–28	Box
64	June 15	@ Indians	7–6	**Santana** (5–3)	Masterson (2–6)	**Rodríguez** (14)	12,882	36–28	Box
65	June 16	@ Indians	8–4	**Niese** (4–2)	Talbot (7–5)	—	14,246	37–28	Box
66	June 17	@ Indians	6–4	**Dickey** (5–0)	Westbrook (4–4)	**Rodríguez** (15)	14,339	38–28	Box
67	June 18	@ Yankees	4–0	**Takahashi** (6–2)	Vázquez (6–6)	**Rodríguez** (16)	49,220	39–28	Box
68	June 19	@ Yankees	3–5	Hughes (10–1)	**Pelfrey** (9–2)	Rivera (16)	49,073	39–29	Box
69	June 20	@ Yankees	0–4	Sabathia (8–3)	**Santana** (5–4)	—	49,240	39–30	Box
70	June 22	Tigers	14–6	**Nieve** (2–3)	Verlander (8–5)	—	32,363	40–30	Box
71	June 23	Tigers	5–0	**Dickey** (6–0)	Bonderman (3–5)	—	35,045	41–30	Box
72	June 24	Tigers	5–6	Galarraga (3-1)	**Takahashi** (6–3)	Valverde (17)	31,319	41–31	Box
73	June 25	Twins	5–2	**Pelfrey** (10–2)	Slowey (7–5)	**Rodríguez** (17)	36,244	42–31	Box
74	June 26	Twins	0–6	Pavano (9–6)	**Santana** (5–5)	—	37,510	42–32	Box
75	June 27	Twins	6–0	**Niese** (5–2)	Baker (6–7)	—	37,644	43–32	Box
76	June 28	@ Marlins^	3–10	Nolasco (7–6)	**Dickey** (6–1)	—	18,073	43–33	Box
77	June 29	@ Marlins^	6–7	Núñez (3–1)	**Feliciano** (2–3)	—	18,373	43–34	Box
78	June 30	@ Marlins^	6–5	**Dessens** (2–1)	Sanabia (0–1)	**Rodríguez** (18)	19,232	44–34	Box
^ - Played in San Juan, Puerto Rico

July (9–17)

#	Date	Opponent	Score	Win	Loss	Save	Attendance	Record	Box
79	July 1	@ Nationals	1–2	Capps (1–3)	**Feliciano** (2–4)	—	20,167	44–35	Box
80	July 2	@ Nationals	5–3	**Niese** (6–2)	Atiano (6–5)	**Rodríguez** (19)	24,410	45–35	Box
81	July 3	@ Nationals	5–6	Capps (2–3)	**Rodríguez** (2–2)	—	39,214	45–36	Box
82	July 4	@ Nationals	9–5	**Takahashi** (7–3)	Stammen (2–3)	**Rodríguez** (20)	29,234	46–36	Box
83	July 5	Reds	6–8	Smith (2–1)	**Pelfrey** (10–3)	Cordero (23)	36,764	46–37	Box
84	July 6	Reds	3–0	**Santana** (6–5)	Maloney (0–1)	—	27,473	47–37	Box
85	July 7	Reds	1–3	Arroyo (9–4)	**Niese** (6–3)	Cordero (24)	30,029	47–38	Box
86	July 9	Braves	2–4	O'Flaherty (3–1)	**Dickey** (6–2)	Wagner (20)	36,356	47–39	Box
87	July 10	Braves	0–4	Hudson (9–4)	**Pelfrey** (10–4)	—	37,793	47–40	Box
88	July 11	Braves	3–0	**Santana** (7–5)	Lowe (9–8)	**Rodríguez** (21)	36,402	48–40	Box
89	July 15	@ Giants	0–2	Lincecum (10–4)	**Dickey** (6–3)	—	38,416	48–41	Box
90	July 16	@ Giants	0–1	Zito (8–4)	**Niese** (6–4)	Wilson (24)	41,869	48–42	Box
91	July 17	@ Giants	4–8	Cain (7–8)	**Takahashi** (7–4)	Wilson (25)	42,599	48–43	Box
92	July 18	@ Giants	4–3 (10)	**Rodríguez** (3–2)	Wilson (2–1)	—	37,623	49–43	Box
93	July 19	@ Diamondbacks	2–13	Kennedy (5–7)	**Pelfrey** (10–5 )	—	18,253	49–44	Box
94	July 20	@ Diamondbacks	2–3	Enright (2–2)	**Dickey** (6–4)	Gutiérrez (3)	18,749	49–45	Box
95	July 21	@ Diamondbacks	3–4 (14)	Boyer (2–2)	**Nieve** (2–4)	—	18,223	49–46	Box
96	July 22	@ Dodgers	0–2	Kuroda (8–8)	**Takahashi** (7–5)	Kuo (3)	42,299	49–47	Box
97	July 23	@ Dodgers	6–1	**Santana** (8–5)	Padilla (4–3)	—	44,626	50–47	Box
98	July 24	@ Dodgers	2–3 (13)	Sherrill (1–1)	Pérez (0–4)	—	43,506	50–48	Box
99	July 25	@ Dodgers	0–1	Kershaw (10–5)	**Feliciano** (2–5)	Jansen (1)	39,897	50–49	Box
100	July 27	Cardinals	8–2	**Niese** (7–4)	Wainwright (14–6)	—	37,479	51–49	Box
101	July 28	Cardinals	7–8 (13)	MacDougal (1–0)	**Feliciano** (2–6)	Franklin (19)	35,009	51–50	Box
102	July 29	Cardinals	4–0	**Dickey** (7–4)	Hawksworth (4–7)	**Rodríguez** (22)	40,087	52–50	Box
103	July 30	Diamondbacks	6–9	Kennedy (6–8)	**Valdés** (2–3)	Heilman (4)	34,280	52–51	Box
104	July 31	Diamondbacks	5–4	**Rodríguez** (4–2)	Gutierrez (0–6)	—	35,287	53–51	Box

August (12–16)

#	Date	Opponent	Score	Win	Loss	Save	Attendance	Record	Box
105	August 1	Diamondbacks	1–14	Hudson (1–0)	**Niese** (7–5)	—	35,014	53–52	Box
106	August 2	@ Braves	1–4	Hudson (12–5)	**Santana** (8–6)	Wagner (25)	33,030	53–53	Box
107	August 3	@ Braves	3–2	**Acosta** (2–1)	Wagner (5–2)	**Rodríguez** (23)	26,578	54–53	Box
108	August 4	@ Braves	3–8	Dunn (1–0)	**Pelfrey** (10–6)	—	28,536	54–54	Box
109	August 6	@ Phillies	5–7	Durbin (3–1)	**Parnell** (0–1)	Lidge (13)	45,378	54–55	Box
110	August 7	@ Phillies	1–0	**Santana** (9–6)	Hamels (7–8)	**Rodríguez** (24)	45,194	55–55	Box
111	August 8	@ Phillies	5–6	Halladay (14–8)	**Dickey** (7–5)	Lidge (14)	45,402	55–56	Box
112	August 10	Rockies	1–0	**Pelfrey** (11–6)	Jiménez (17–3)	**Rodríguez** (25)	30,036	56–56	Box
113	August 11	Rockies	2–6	Belisle (5–4)	**Takahashi** (7–6)	—	30,554	56–57	Box
114	August 12	Rockies	4–0	**Santana** (10–6)	Hammel (8–7)	—	32,272	57–57	Box
115	August 13	Phillies	1–0	**Dickey** (8–5)	Hamels (7–9)	—	35,440	58–57	Box
116	August 14	Phillies	0–4	Halladay (15–8)	**Misch** (0–1)	—	39,151	58–58	Box
117	August 15	Phillies	1–3	Kendrick (8–5)	**Pelfrey** (11–7)	Lidge (16)	31,345	58–59	Box
118	August 16	@ Astros	3–1	**Feliciano** (3–6)	Lindstrom (2–4)	**Takahashi** (1)	22,688	59–59	Box
119	August 17	@ Astros	3–4	Melancon (1–0)	**Santana** (10–7)	López (1)	26,279	59–60	Box
120	August 18	@ Astros	3–2	**Dessens** (3–1)	Chacín (1–2)	Acosta (1)	23,403	60–60	Box
121	August 19	@ Astros	2–3	Norris (6–7)	**Misch** (0–2)	Lyon (5)	26,271	60–61	Box
122	August 20	@ Pirates	7–2	**Pelfrey** (12–7)	Karstens (2–10)	—	23,695	61–61	Box
123	August 21	@ Pirates	5–1 (6)	**Niese** (8–5)	McDonald (2–3)	—	28,759	62–61	Box
124	August 22	@ Pirates	1–2	Duke (6–12)	**Santana** (10–8)	Hanrahan (2)	24,730	62–62	Box
125	August 24	Marlins	6–5	**Takahashi** (8–6)	Ohman (0–2)	—	27,136	63–62	Box
126	August 25	Marlins	4–5	Sanabia (3-1)	**Misch** (0-3)	Núñez (29)	27,096	63–63	Box
127	August 26	Marlins	4–11	Sánchez (11-8)	**Niese** (8–6)	—	28,640	63–64	Box
128	August 27	Astros	2–1	**Pelfrey** (13–7)	Figueroa (3-2)	**Takahashi** (2)	30,178	64–64	Box
129	August 28	Astros	1–4	Myers (10–7)	**Santana** (10–9)	Lyon (9)	33,024	64–65	Box
130	August 29	Astros	5–1	**Dickey** (8–5)	Norris (6–8)	—	32,779	65–65	Box
131	August 30	@ Braves	3–9	Jurrjens (6–4)	**Misch** (0–4)	O'Flaherty (9)	18,842	65–66	Box
132	August 31	@ Braves	2–9	Minor (3–0)	**Niese** (8–7)	—	18,430	65–67	Box

September (14–16)

#	Date	Opponent	Score	Win	Loss	Save	Attendance	Record	Box
133	September 1	@ Braves	1–4	Hanson (9–10)	**Pelfrey** (13–8)	Wagner (31)	19,938	66–68	Box
134	September 2	@ Braves	4–2	**Santana** (11–9)	Hudson (15–6)	**Takahashi** (3)	24,895	66–68	Box
135	September 3	@ Cubs	6–7	Russell (1–1)	**Dickey** (9–6)	Mármol (26)	31,424	66–69	Box
136	September 4	@ Cubs	3–5	Zambrano (6–5)	**Mejía** (0–3)	Mármol (27)	39,473	66–70	Box
137	September 5	@ Cubs	18–5	**Niese** (9–7)	Dempster (12–10)	—	40,788	67–70	Box
138	September 6	@ Nationals	3–13	Olsen (4–8)	**Pelfrey** (13–9)	—	20,224	67–71	Box
139	September 7	@ Nationals	4–1	**Gee** (1–0)	Maya (0–1)	**Takahashi** (4)	13,835	68–71	Box
140	September 8	@ Nationals	3–2	**Dickey** (10–6)	Hernández (9–11)	**Takahashi** (5)	16,002	69–71	Box
141	September 10	Phillies	4–8	Halladay (18–10)	**Mejía** (0–4)	—	33,071	69–72	Box
142	September 11	Phillies	4–3	**Pelfrey** (14–9)	Kendrick (9–9)	**Takahashi** (6)	35,788	70–72	Box
143	September 12	Phillies	0–3	Oswalt (12–13)	**Niese** (9–8)	—	31,563	70–73	Box
144	September 13	Pirates	1–0 (10)	**Takahashi** (9–6)	Park (3–3)	—	24,384	71–73	Box
145	September 14	Pirates	9–1	**Dickey** (11–6)	Duke (7–14)	—	27,438	72–73	Box
146	September 15	Pirates	8–7	**Valdés** (3–3)	Maholm (7–15)	**Takahashi** (7)	29,000	73–73	Box
147	September 16	Pirates	6–2	**Pelfrey** (15–9)	Ledezma (0–3)	—	28,790	74–73	Box
148	September 17	Braves	4–6	Hanson (10–11)	**Niese** (9–9)	Wagner (34)	28,002	74–74	Box
149	September 18	Braves	2–4	Hudson (16–8)	**Gee** (1–1)	Wagner (35)	33,051	74–75	Box
150	September 19	Braves	3–6	Lowe (14–12)	**Dickey** (11–7)	Kimbrel (1)	33,612	74–76	Box
151	September 21	@ Marlins	2–5	Veras (3–2)	**Dessens** (3–2)	Hensley (4)	19,422	74–77	Box
152	September 22	@ Marlins	5–7	Sanabia (5–3)	**Niese** (9–10)	Hensley (5)	21,123	74–78	Box
153	September 24	@ Phillies	2–3	Blanton (8–6)	**Dickey** (11–8)	Lidge (27)	45,309	74–79	Box
154	September 25	@ Phillies	5–2	**Gee** (2–1)	Kendrick (10–10)	**Takahashi** (8)	45,274	75–79	Box
155	September 26	@ Phillies	7–3	**Acosta** (3–1)	Hamels (12–11)	—	45,302	76–79	Box
—	September 27	Brewers	Game Postponed						
156	September 28	Brewers	4–3	**Dessens** (4–2)	Axford (8–2)	—	24,666	77–79	Box
157	September 29	Brewers	7–8	Villanueva (2–0)	**Acosta** (3–2)	Axford (23)	—	77–80	Box
158	September 29	Brewers	1–3	Bush (8–13)	**Dickey** (11–9)	Hoffman (10)	28,280	77–81	Box
159	September 30	Brewers	2–9	Narveson (12–9)	**Gee** (2–2)	—	24,661	77–82	Box
160	October 1	Nationals	2–1 (10)	**Takahashi** (10–6)	Clippard (11–7)	—	29,424	78–82	Box
161	October 2	Nationals	7–2	**Igarashi** (1–1)	Clippard (11–8)	—	30,386	79–82	Box
162	October 3	Nationals	1–2	Peralta (1–0)	**Pérez** (0–5)	Batista (2)	30,849	79–83	Box

Legend: = Win = Loss = Postponement
**Bold** = Mets team member

=== Season standings ===
==== National League East ====
NL East
Team	W	L	Pct.	GB	Home	Road
Philadelphia Phillies	97	65	.599	—	54‍–‍30	43‍–‍35
Atlanta Braves	91	71	.562	6	56‍–‍25	35‍–‍46
Florida Marlins	80	82	.494	17	41‍–‍40	39‍–‍42
New York Mets	79	83	.488	18	47‍–‍34	32‍–‍49
Washington Nationals	69	93	.426	28	41‍–‍40	28‍–‍53

==== National League Wild Card ====
Division leaders
Team	W	L	Pct.
Philadelphia Phillies	97	65	.599
San Francisco Giants	92	70	.568
Cincinnati Reds	91	71	.562

Wild Card team (Top team qualifies for postseason)
Team	W	L	Pct.	GB
Atlanta Braves	91	71	.562	—
San Diego Padres	90	72	.556	1
St. Louis Cardinals	86	76	.531	5
Colorado Rockies	83	79	.512	8
Florida Marlins	80	82	.494	11
Los Angeles Dodgers	80	82	.494	11
New York Mets	79	83	.488	12
Milwaukee Brewers	77	85	.475	14
Houston Astros	76	86	.469	15
Chicago Cubs	75	87	.463	16
Washington Nationals	69	93	.426	22
Arizona Diamondbacks	65	97	.401	26
Pittsburgh Pirates	57	105	.352	34

==== Record vs. opponents ====
2010 National League record Source: MLB Standings Grid – 2010
Team	AZ	ATL	CHC	CIN	COL	FLA	HOU	LAD	MIL	NYM	PHI	PIT	SD	SF	STL	WSH	AL
Arizona	–	3–4	1–6	2–5	9–9	3–3	4–3	5–13	3–4	5–1	2–4	2–4	8–10	5–13	4–5	3–4	6–9
Atlanta	4–3	–	4–2	3–2	2–4	11–7	5–1	5–3	5–2	11–7	8–10	6–3	4–2	4–3	2–6	8–10	9–6
Chicago	6–1	2–4	–	4–12	2–3	4–2	7–11	3–4	9–6	3–4	4–2	5–10	3–5	2–5	9–6	4–2	8–10
Cincinnati	5–2	2–3	12–4	–	2–5	5–2	10–5	5–4	11–3	4–2	2–5	10–6	2–4	3–4	6–12	4–3	8–7
Colorado	9–9	4–2	3–2	5–2	–	3–4	2–4	7–11	5–4	3–3	1–6	3–4	12–6	9–9	3–4	5–3	9–6
Florida	3–3	7–11	2–4	2–5	4–3	–	3–3	4–2	4–4	12–6	5–13	6–2	3–6	2–5	3–2	13–5	7–8
Houston	3–4	1–5	11–7	5–10	4–2	3–3	–	2–4	8–7	3–4	4–3	11–4	2–5	2–7	10–5	4–4	3–12
Los Angeles	13–5	3–5	4–3	4–5	11–7	2–4	4–2	–	4–2	3–4	2–4	4–3	8–10	8–10	3–4	3–3	4–11
Milwaukee	4–3	2–5	6–9	3–11	4–5	4–4	7–8	2–4	–	5–2	1–5	13–5	3–4	2–5	8–7	4–2	9–6
New York	1–5	7–11	4–3	2–4	3–3	6–12	4–3	4–3	2–5	–	9–9	6–1	3–3	3–4	3–3	9–9	13–5
Philadelphia	4–2	10–8	2–4	5–2	6–1	13–5	3–4	4–2	5–1	9–9	–	2–4	5–2	3–3	4–4	12–6	10–8
Pittsburgh	4–2	3–6	10–5	6–10	4–3	2–6	4–11	3–4	5–13	1–6	4–2	–	0–6	2–4	6–9	1–5	2–13
San Diego	10–8	2–4	5–3	4–2	6–12	6–3	5–2	10–8	4–3	3–3	2–5	6–0	–	12–6	3–4	3–3	9–6
San Francisco	13–5	3–4	5–2	4–3	9–9	5–2	7–2	10–8	5–2	4–3	3–3	4–2	6–12	–	3–3	4–2	7–8
St. Louis	5–4	6–2	6–9	12–6	4–3	2–3	5–10	4–3	7–8	3–3	4–4	9–6	4–3	3–3	–	3–3	9–6
Washington	4–3	10–8	2–4	3–4	3–5	5–13	4–4	3–3	2–4	9–9	6–12	5–1	3–3	2–4	3–3	–	5–13

=== Roster ===
2010 New York Mets
**Roster**
**Pitchers**: 36 Manny Acosta; 64 Elmer Dessens; 43 R. A. Dickey; 25 Pedro Feliciano; 35 Dillon Gee; 50 Sean Green; 18 Ryota Igarashi; 33 John Maine; 32 Jenrry Mejía; 48 Patrick Misch; 49 Jon Niese; 38 Fernando Nieve; 39 Bobby Parnell; 34 Mike Pelfrey; 46 Óliver Pérez; 75 Francisco Rodríguez; 57 Johan Santana; 29 Tobi Stoner; 47 Hisanori Takahashi; 22 Raúl Valdés	**Catchers**: 21 Rod Barajas; 4 Henry Blanco; 13 Mike Nickeas; 30 Josh Thole; **Infielders**: 12 Joaquín Árias; 1 Luis Castillo; 13 Alex Cora; 29 Ike Davis; 19 Mike Hessman; 3 Luis Hernández; 35 Mike Jacobs; 7 José Reyes; 17 Fernando Tatís; 11 Rubén Tejada; 2 Justin Turner; 5 David Wright; **Outfielders**: 44 Jason Bay; 15 Carlos Beltrán; 23 Chris Carter; 27 Frank Catalanotto; 21 Lucas Duda; 6 Nick Evans; 27 Jesús Feliciano; 12 Jeff Francoeur; 26 Fernando Martínez; 19 Gary Matthews, Jr.; 16 Ángel Pagán	**Manager**: 53 Jerry Manuel; **Coaches**: 51 Chip Hale (third base); 56 Dave Jauss (bench); 20 Howard Johnson (hitting); 55 Randy Niemann (bullpen); 52 Razor Shines (first base); 59 Dan Warthen (pitching)

== Player stats ==
=== Batting ===
Note: G = Games played; AB = At bats; R = Runs scored; H = Hits; 2B = Doubles; 3B = Triples; HR = Home runs; RBI = Runs batted in; SB = Stolen bases; BB = Base on balls; K = Strikeouts; AVG = Batting average

Player	G	AB	R	H	2B	3B	HR	RBI	SB	BB	K	AVG
José Reyes	133	563	83	159	29	10	11	54	30	31	63	.282
David Wright	157	587	87	166	36	3	29	103	19	69	161	.293
Ángel Pagán	151	579	80	168	31	7	11	69	37	44	97	.290
Jason Bay	95	348	48	90	20	6	6	47	10	44	91	.259
Jeff Francoeur	124	401	43	95	16	2	11	54	8	29	76	.237
Ike Davis	147	523	73	138	33	1	19	71	3	72	178	.264
Rod Barajas	74	249	56	30	11	0	12	34	0	8	39	.225
Carlos Beltrán	64	220	21	56	11	3	7	27	3	30	39	.255
Josh Thole	73	202	17	56	7	1	3	17	1	24	25	.277
Luis Castillo	86	247	28	58	4	2	0	17	8	39	25	.235
Alex Cora	62	169	14	35	6	3	0	20	4	10	16	.207
Henry Blanco	50	130	10	28	5	0	2	8	1	11	26	.215
Gary Matthews, Jr.	36	58	9	11	3	0	0	1	1	6	24	.190
Fernando Tatís	41	65	6	12	4	0	2	6	0	6	19	.185
Chris Carter	100	167	15	44	9	0	4	24	1	12	17	.263
Rubén Tejada	78	216	28	46	12	0	1	15	2	22	38	.213
Lucas Duda	29	84	11	17	6	0	4	13	0	6	22	.202
Mike Pelfrey	32	62	2	7	0	0	0	3	0	2	13	.113
Johan Santana	27	62	2	11	3	0	1	1	0	0	22	.177
Mike Hessman	32	55	6	7	2	1	1	6	0	8	23	.127
Frank Catalanotto	25	25	2	4	1	0	0	1	0	1	5	.160
Mike Jacobs	7	24	1	5	1	0	1	2	0	3	7	.208
Jon Niese	30	53	3	10	2	0	0	4	0	8	27	.189
Jesús Feliciano	54	108	12	25	4	1	0	3	1	6	12	.231
Luis Hernández	17	44	4	11	1	0	2	6	1	2	7	.250
Nick Evans	20	36	5	11	3	0	1	5	0	1	10	.306
R. A. Dickey	25	51	7	13	2	0	0	5	0	3	8	.255
Joaquín Árias	22	30	5	6	1	0	0	4	0	2	6	.200
John Maine	10	10	0	0	0	0	0	0	0	0	6	.000
Óliver Pérez	17	9	0	1	0	0	0	1	0	1	4	.111
Hisanori Takahashi	51	16	0	1	0	0	0	0	0	0	3	.063
Fernando Martínez	7	18	1	3	0	0	0	2	0	1	5	.167
Dillon Gee	5	12	0	2	1	0	0	1	0	0	8	.167
Mike Nickeas	5	10	0	2	0	0	0	0	0	0	5	.200
Raúl Valdés	36	10	1	4	1	0	0	1	0	0	3	.400
Pat Misch	12	8	0	1	0	0	0	0	0	0	4	.125
Justin Turner	4	8	1	1	1	0	0	0	0	1	0	.125
Ramón Ortiz	16	5	0	0	0	0	0	0	0	0	2	.000
Jenrry Mejía	30	3	1	1	0	0	0	0	0	0	1	.333
Fernando Nieve	39	2	0	0	0	0	0	0	0	0	0	.000
Bobby Parnell	41	1	0	0	0	0	0	0	0	0	0	.000
Team totals	162	5465	656	1361	266	40	128	625	130	502	1095	.249

=== Pitching ===
Note: G = Games pitched; GS = Games started; W = Wins; L = Losses; SV = Saves; IP = Innings pitched; H = Hits allowed; R = Runs allowed; ER = Earned runs allowed; BB = Walks allowed; K = Strikeouts; ERA = Earned run average;

Player	G	GS	W	L	SV	IP	H	R	ER	BB	K	ERA
Mike Pelfrey	34	33	15	9	1	204.0	213	88	83	68	113	3.66
Johan Santana	29	29	11	9	0	199.0	179	67	66	55	144	2.98
R. A. Dickey	27	26	11	9	0	174.1	165	62	55	42	104	2.84
Jon Niese	30	30	9	10	0	173.2	192	97	81	62	148	4.20
Hisanori Takahashi	53	12	10	6	8	122.0	116	51	49	43	114	3.61
Pedro Feliciano	92	0	3	6	0	62.2	66	24	23	30	56	3.30
Raúl Valdés	38	1	3	3	1	58.2	59	33	32	27	56	4.91
Francisco Rodríguez	53	0	4	2	25	57.1	45	14	14	21	67	2.20
Elmer Dessens	53	0	4	2	0	47.0	41	14	12	16	16	2.30
Óliver Pérez	17	7	0	5	0	46.1	54	37	35	42	37	6.80
Fernando Nieve	40	1	2	4	0	42.0	37	28	28	22	38	6.00
Manny Acosta	41	0	3	2	1	39.2	30	13	13	18	42	2.95
John Maine	9	9	1	3	0	39.2	47	29	27	25	39	6.13
Jenrry Mejía	33	3	0	4	0	39.0	46	21	20	20	22	4.62
Pat Misch	12	6	0	4	0	37.2	43	20	16	4	23	3.82
Bobby Parnell	41	0	0	1	0	35.0	41	13	11	8	33	2.83
Dillon Gee	5	5	2	2	0	33.0	25	10	8	15	17	2.18
Ryota Igarashi	34	0	1	1	0	30.1	29	24	24	18	25	7.12
Ramón Ortiz	16	2	1	2	0	30.0	33	22	21	16	21	6.30
Brian Bruney	19	0	1	2	0	17.2	21	18	15	20	16	7.64
Sean Green	11	0	0	0	0	9.1	7	6	4	8	12	3.86
Tobi Stoner	1	0	0	1	0	2.1	3	1	1	1	0	3.86
Team totals	162	162	79	83	36	1453.0	1438	652	597	545	1106	3.70

== Farm system ==
Level	Team	League	Manager
AAA	Buffalo Bisons	International League	Ken Oberkfell
AA	Binghamton Mets	Eastern League	Tim Teufel
A	St. Lucie Mets	Florida State League	Edgar Alfonzo
A	Savannah Sand Gnats	South Atlantic League	Pedro López
A-Short Season	Brooklyn Cyclones	New York–Penn League	Wally Backman
Rookie	Kingsport Mets	Appalachian League	Mike DiFelice
Rookie	GCL Mets	Gulf Coast League	Sandy Alomar Sr.

Preceded by 2009	New York Mets seasons 2010	Succeeded by 2011
