= Ryota Igarashi =

Japanese baseball player (born 1979)

Ryota Igarashi 五十嵐亮太
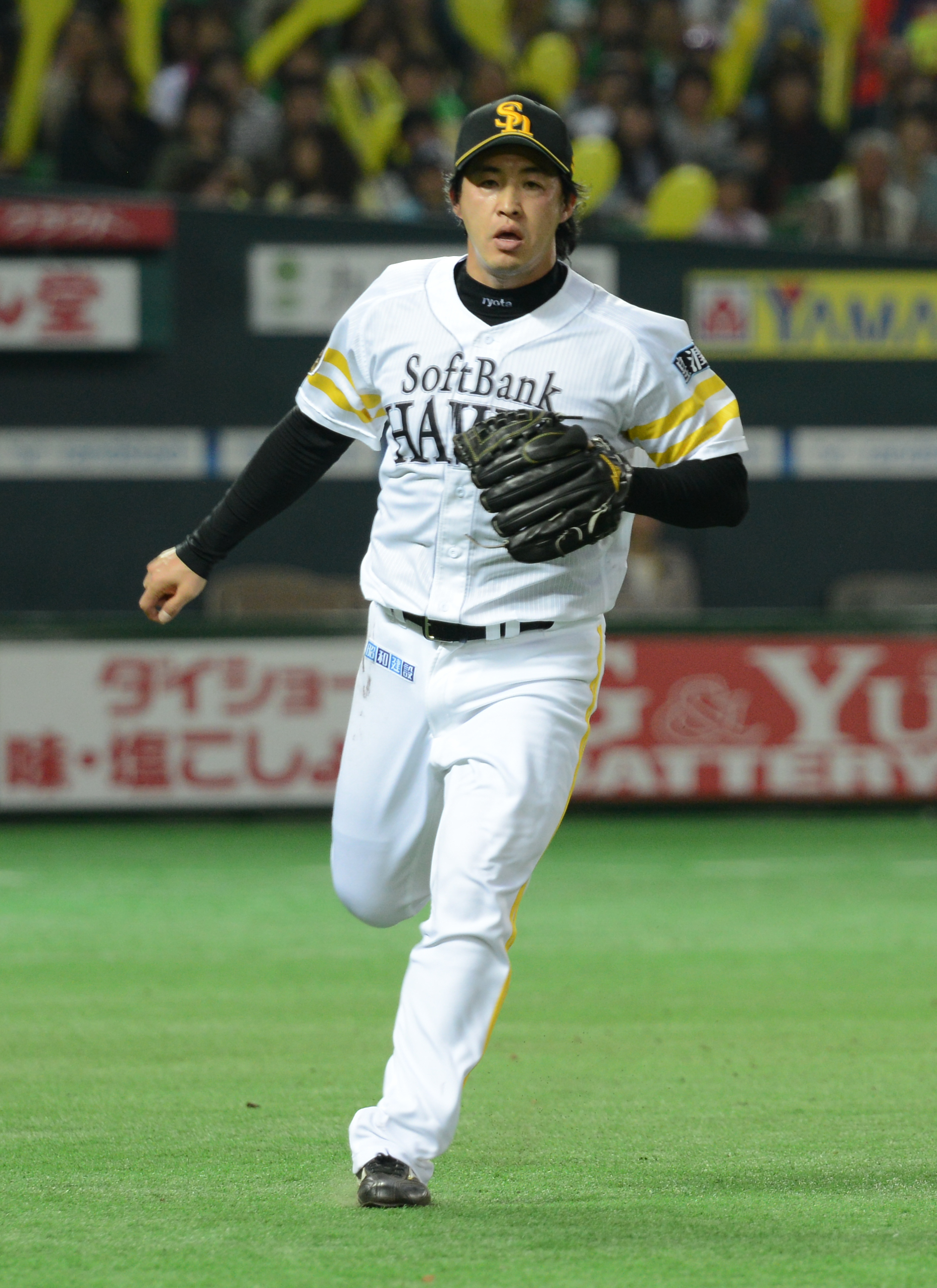
- Igarashi with the Fukuoka SoftBank Hawks
- Pitcher
- Born: May 28, 1979 (age 47); Rumoi, Hokkaido, Japan
- Batted: Right-handed Threw: Right-handed

Professional debut
- NPB: April 20, 1999, for the Yakult Swallows
- MLB: April 8, 2010, for the New York Mets

Last appearance
- NPB: October 25, 2020, for the Tokyo Yakult Swallows
- MLB: August 12, 2012, for the New York Yankees

NPB statistics (through 2020 season)
- Win–loss record: 65–39
- Earned run average: 2.93
- Holds: 163
- Saves: 70
- Strikeouts: 920

MLB statistics (through 2012 season)
- Win–loss record: 5–2
- Earned run average: 6.41
- Strikeouts: 72
- Stats at Baseball Reference

Teams
- Yakult Swallows/Tokyo Yakult Swallows (1998–2009); New York Mets (2010–2011); Toronto Blue Jays (2012); New York Yankees (2012); Fukuoka SoftBank Hawks (2013–2018); Tokyo Yakult Swallows (2019–2020)

Career highlights and awards
- 1× Central League Saves Champion (2004); 6× NPB All-Star (2000, 2002–2005, 2014); 5× Japan Series champion (2001, 2014, 2015, 2017, 2018)

Ryota Igarashi (五十嵐 亮太, Igarashi Ryōta; born May 28, 1979) is a Japanese former professional baseball pitcher. He has played in Nippon Professional Baseball (NPB) for the Tokyo Yakult Swallows, Fukuoka SoftBank Hawks and in Major League Baseball (MLB) for the New York Mets, Toronto Blue Jays and New York Yankees.

Igarashi began his career with the Yakult Swallows of NPB in 1999. For Yakult, he was a five-time All-Star. After the 2009 season, Igarashi signed with the New York Mets of MLB as a free agent and pitched for them in 2010 and 2011. He briefly pitched for the Toronto Blue Jays and New York Yankees of MLB in 2012.

== Career ==
=== Yakult Swallows/Tokyo Yakult Swallows ===
Igarashi was a second-round draft pick of the Yakult Swallows in 1997 NPB draft. He threw a 6-inning perfect game in ni-gun on September 26, 1998; the contest was cut short due to rain. Igarashi had a 6-4 win–loss record with a save and a 4.91 earned run average (ERA) in 36 games as a rookie in 1999. He had won 11 games before the All-Star break his next season, 2000. He finished the year 11–4 with a save and a 3.11 ERA. He allowed only 42 hits in 75 1/3 innings pitched (IP) for a .160 batting average against. He struck out 90 batters, but also walked 33. He was named to the Central League (CL) All-Star team for the first time.

Igarashi suffered a couple of injuries in 2001, going 2–3 with a 2.59 ERA. He allowed a .172 average and struck out 51 in 41 2/3 IP while walking 28. He pitched one game in the 2001 Japan Series, giving up three runs in one inning in Game Two, a loss to the Osaka Kintetsu Buffaloes; Yakult won the Series, taking the other four contests.

The right-hander made 64 appearances in 2002 and was 8–2 with 4 saves and a 2.08 ERA. He held opponents to 49 hits in 78 innings and fanned 97. The lone negative was eight wild pitches, leading the CL. He was again a CL All-Star while being used as a setup man for Shingo Takatsu.

The Hokkaido native was 5–5 with a 3.89 ERA in 2003, whiffing 83 in 74 innings and being named an All-Star again. He pitched in 66 games, leading the CL. When Takatsu left for the Chicago White Sox, the 24-year-old was handed the Swallows' closer job. Igarashi went 5–3 with 37 saves and a 2.66 ERA in 2004. He held opponents to a .210 average and struck out 86 in 74 1/3 IP. He led the CL in both saves and appearances (66). He made the All-Star team for the fourth time. He won the Fireman of the Year Award, which Takatsu had taken three times. Along with Hirotoshi Ishii, he was known as one of the "Rocket Boys", noted for their fastballs in the mid-90s. On June 3, he threw a 158 km/h (98 mph) fastball, tying the Nippon Professional Baseball (NPB) record for fastest pitch ever (held by Hideki Irabu and Kazuo Yamaguchi); Igarashi would hit that figure several more times in his career. The record didn't even last a year as Marc Kroon broke it in May 2005. He still holds the record for the fastest pitch in an All-Star game, at 157 km/h.

Igarashi was injured early in 2005 and lost his closer job to Ishii. Returning to a setup role, he was 3–2 with 4 saves and a 3.49 ERA. He struck out 60 in 56 2/3 IP but walked 27 and allowed a .248 average. He made his fifth All-Star team. On April 6, he teamed with Shugo Fujii and Ishii to strike out 19 batters, a NPB record.

Igarashi only made 29 appearances in 2006 and struggled, with a 1–2 record, 6.12 ERA and one save. Opponents hit .324 against him. He had Tommy John surgery after the season and missed all of 2007.

Igarashi returned to full form in 2008, throwing between 92 and 95 mph often. He had a 3–2 record with three saves and a 2.47 ERA In 44 games, with a career-best 0.94 WHIP. His strikeout rate was a bit off his peak, with 42 in 43 2/3 IP. The closer role had now gone to South Korean Chang-yong Lim.

The veteran hurler was 3–2 with 3 saves and a 3.19 ERA in 2009. He set a Yakult franchise record by not allowing a run in 21 consecutive games. Opponents hit .216 against him but he again failed to top a strikeout per inning, his old standard, as he fanned 44 in 53 2/3 IP. He tied for 10th in the CL in appearances.

In 2008, Igarashi declined to file for domestic free agency, with the intention of becoming an international free agent in the 2009 off-season.

=== New York Mets ===
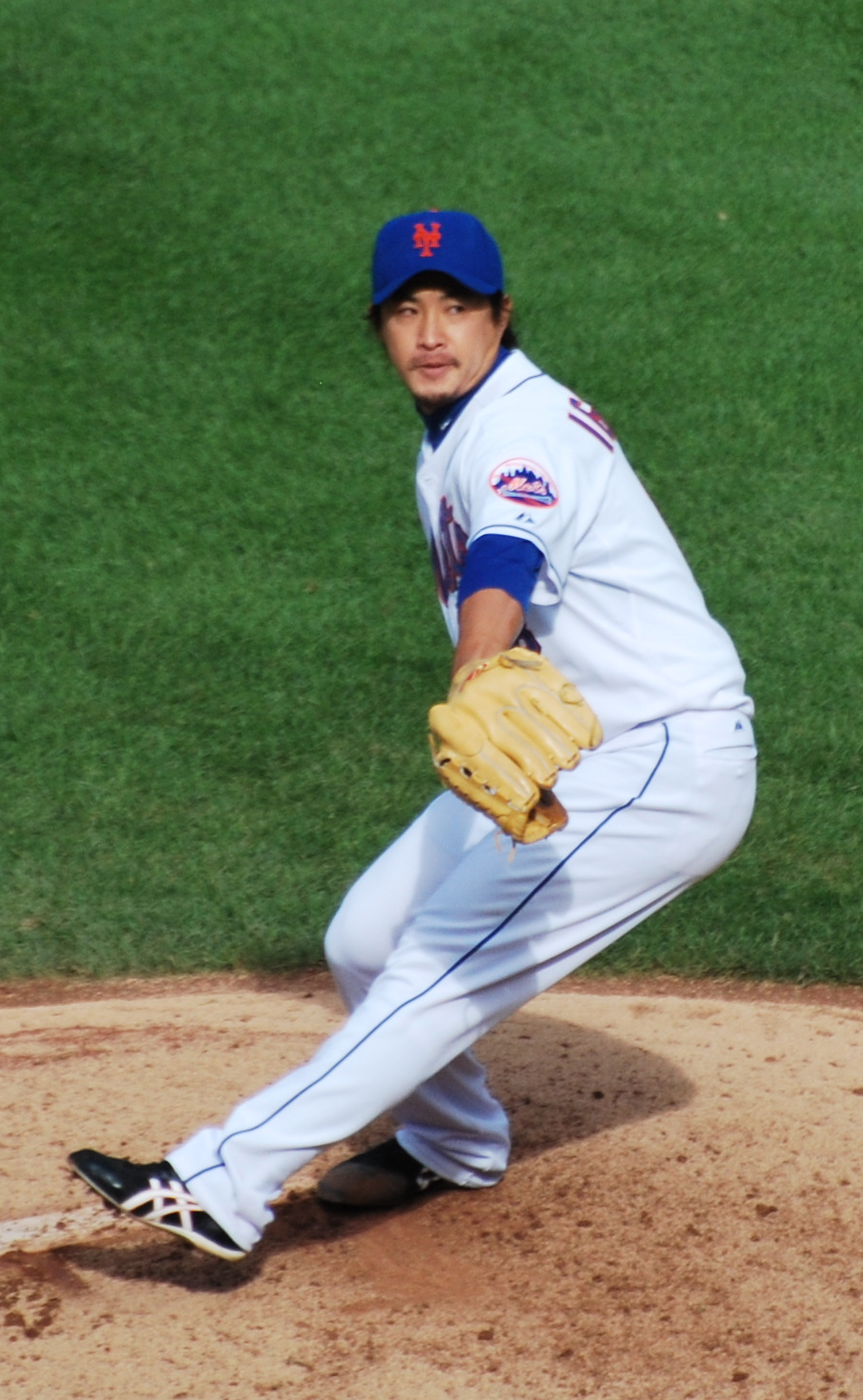
Igarashi with the New York Mets

On December 16, 2009, Igarashi agreed to a two-year contract worth $3 million with the New York Mets. He was expected to become the setup pitcher for closer Francisco Rodríguez. He joined the Mets with Yomiuri Giants pitcher Hisanori Takahashi.

Igarashi debuted for the 2010 New York Mets on April 8, relieving Jonathon Niese in the 7th inning against the Florida Marlins. He began by walking Cameron Maybin but got Hanley Ramírez to ground into a double play and then got Jorge Cantú on a pop fly. Fellow Japanese rookie Takahashi replaced him in the 8th inning.

Igarashi allowed only one run in his first seven MLB appearances, but he was placed on the disabled list on April 21, 2010 after suffering a hamstring injury. He was replaced on the roster by Manny Acosta. Igarashi returned replacing Acosta on the active roster.

Igarashi was designated for assignment after the 2010 season. However, he would return to the Mets for the 2011 season. He was released on October 20, after he and the Mets failed to agree to a new contract, as a clause in his contract kept him under team control even after it expired, unless the Mets granted him his release.

After the season, Igarashi pitched in the Dominican Winter League with the Leones del Escogido.

=== Pittsburgh Pirates ===
He was signed by the Pittsburgh Pirates to a minor league contract with an invitation to 2012 spring training on December 14, 2011. After being cut from Major League spring training on March 29, 2012, Igarashi said through Erwin Valencia, the Pirates Physical Therapist and Rehab Coordinator, "[I] was shocked about the news", and "[I] did everything [I] could have done up to this point."

=== Toronto Blue Jays ===
On March 30, 2012, the Toronto Blue Jays acquired Igarashi from the Pittsburgh Pirates for a player to be named later or cash. He was assigned to the Las Vegas 51s of the PCL. The Blue Jays promoted Igarashi to MLB on May 25. He was designated for assignment 2 days later. Igarashi was 0–0 with a 36.00 ERA in 2 games.

=== New York Yankees ===
Igarashi was claimed by the New York Yankees from the Toronto Blue Jays on May 29, 2012. The Yankees promoted Igarashi on June 6, when they placed Freddy García on the bereavement list. He was then optioned back down to Triple-A on June 10 after Garcia was reactivated. Igarashi was recalled on August 12 when CC Sabathia was placed on the disabled list. Igarashi was optioned back to Triple-A on August 13 when Derek Lowe was signed. On August 16, he was outrighted to the Scranton/Wilkes-Barre Yankees.

In October 2012, Igarashi elected minor league free agency.

=== Fukuoka SoftBank Hawks ===
On November 17, 2012, Igarashi signed a 3-year, ~$18 million deal with the Fukuoka SoftBank Hawks.

=== Second stint with the Swallows ===
In 2019, he re-joined the Tokyo Yakult Swallows.

On October 15, 2020, Igarashi held press conference and announced his retirement after the season.

== Playing style ==
Igarashi throws a fastball that is routinely in the mid-90s (mph), a forkball, and a split-finger fastball.

== Personal ==
Igarashi has a wife, Orie, a daughter, Kotone, and a son, Haruki. Much of his family lives 200 miles (320 km) south of the location of the 2011 Tōhoku earthquake and tsunami.

== See also ==
- List of Major League Baseball players from Japan
