= Raúl Valdés =

Cuban-Dominican baseball player (born 1977)

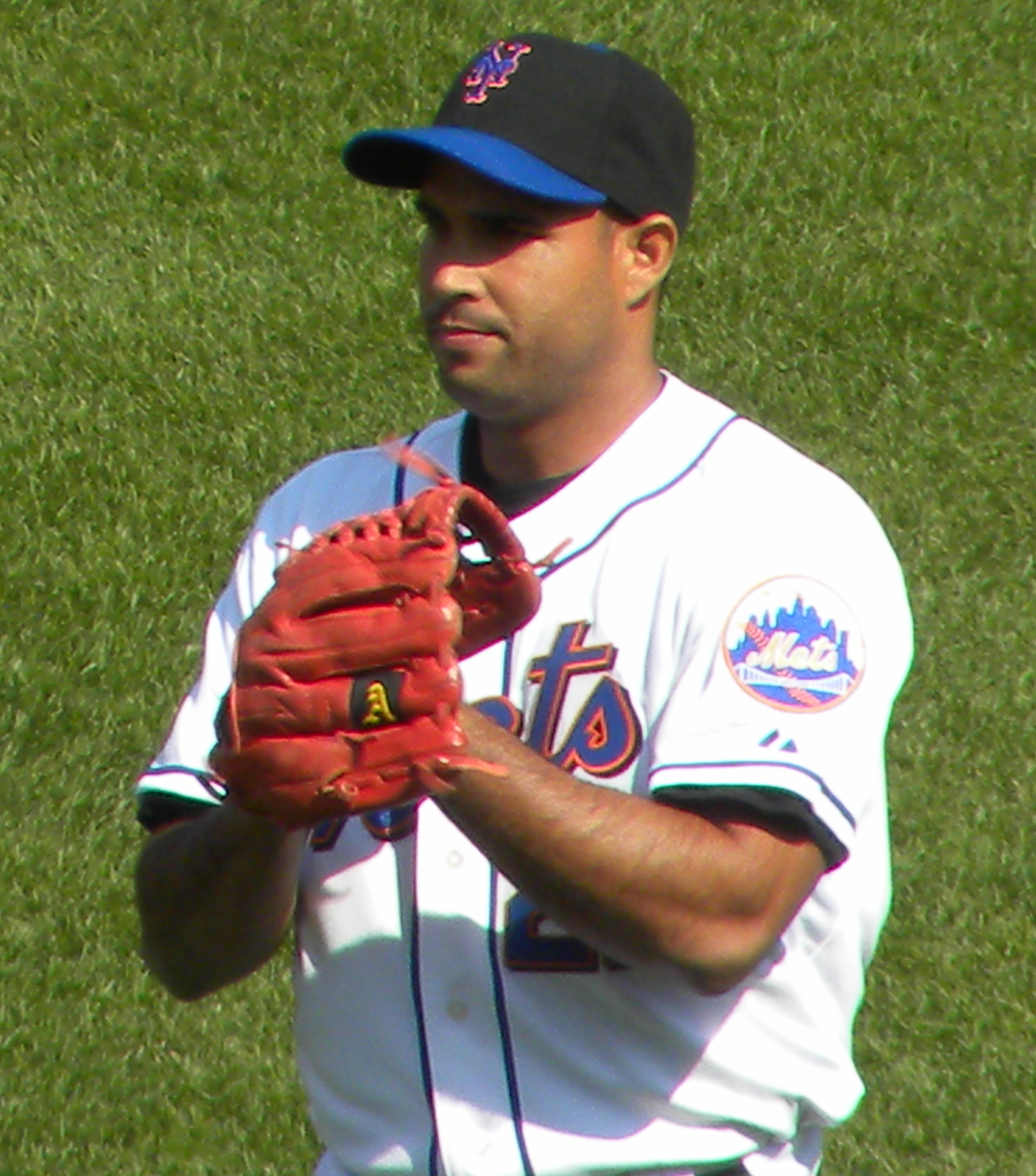
- Valdés with the New York Mets in 2010
- Pitcher
- Born: November 27, 1977 (age 48); Havana, Cuba
- Batted: Left Threw: Left

Professional debut
- MLB: April 11, 2010, for the New York Mets
- NPB: March 28, 2015, for the Chunichi Dragons

Last appearance
- MLB: May 3, 2014, for the Houston Astros
- NPB: August 25, 2017, for the Chunichi Dragons

MLB statistics
- Win–loss record: 7–7
- Earned run average: 5.13
- Strikeouts: 147

NPB statistics
- Win–loss record: 17–24
- Earned run average: 3.49
- Strikeouts: 279
- Stats at Baseball Reference

Teams
- New York Mets (2010); St. Louis Cardinals (2011); New York Yankees (2011); Philadelphia Phillies (2012–2013); Houston Astros (2014); Chunichi Dragons (2015–2017)

Career highlights and awards
- NPB All-Star (2017)
Medals
Men's baseball
Representing Dominican Republic
Olympic Games
Bronze medal – third place	2020 Tokyo	Team

Raúl Valdés Rubio (born November 27, 1977) is a Cuban-Dominican former professional baseball pitcher. He played in Major League Baseball (MLB) for the New York Mets, St. Louis Cardinals, New York Yankees, Philadelphia Phillies and Houston Astros, and in Nippon Professional Baseball (NPB) for the Chunichi Dragons.

== Professional career ==
=== Chicago Cubs ===
In 2003, Valdés defected from Cuba, where he was a member of the Cuban National team. He signed with the Chicago Cubs as a non-drafted free agent in 2004, and was assigned to the Cubs farm team of the Dominican Summer League. He posted a 7–2 record with a 0.51 earned run average in 16 games for the Dominican Cubs, holding the opponents to a .127 batting average. He also saw action as an outfielder, batting .241 with 12 doubles and 26 runs batted in in 50 games, and was selected for the DSL Post-Season All-Star.

Valdés opened 2005 with the Double-A West Tenn Diamond Jaxx, but was promoted rapidly to the Triple–A Iowa Cubs on May 9. He went 2–0 in five starts, struck out 18 batters and issued just three walks over 23 innings of work for West Tenn. While in Iowa, he was 6–7 with a save in 25 appearances (17 starts), working six or more innings in six of his starts, ending 5–0 with a 2.15 ERA in those outings.

In 2006, Valdés dropped to 1–3 with a 7.59 ERA in 32 innings for Iowa before being released.

=== Independent leagues ===
Valdés joined the independent Can-Am League, going 2–1 with a 5.09 ERA in four games for the Nashua Pride and 7–3 with a 2.81 ERA in 17 games, including 12 starts, for the New Jersey Jackals.

=== New York Mets ===
Valdés signed a minor league contract with the New York Mets after the end of the season. He started 2007 with the High–A St. Lucie Mets and later was promoted to the Double–A Binghamton Mets. He combined for a 0–2 record with a 4.17 ERA and one save in 23 games (one start), before being released.

Since 2008, Valdés has pitched winter baseball for the Gigantes del Cibao of the Dominican League and Navegantes del Magallanes of the Venezuelan League. He represented the Dominican team in the 2010 Caribbean Series, in which he led all pitchers in wins (two) and strikeouts (13) and was selected to the All-Star Team.

Valdés was invited to spring training with the Mets in 2010. He was sent to the Triple–A Buffalo Bisons to start the season, but was quickly promoted to the major leagues. On May 11, Valdés got his first major league victory in an 8–6 win over the Washington Nationals. On July 6, Valdés was called back as the Mets placed Fernando Tatís on the 15-day disabled list. On August 13, Valdés was optioned to Triple–A along with Ryota Igarashi to make room for Pat Misch and Francisco Rodríguez. On November 5, Valdés was sent outright to Buffalo and became a free agent after refusing the minor league assignment.

=== St. Louis Cardinals ===
On November 23, 2010, Valdés signed a minor league contract with an invitation to spring training with the St. Louis Cardinals. Valdés made seven appearances for St. Louis, pitching in 5 1/3 innings and allowing two earned runs on six hits. He was designated for assignment on August 12, 2011.

=== New York Yankees ===
On August 16, 2011, Valdés was claimed off waivers by the New York Yankees. On August 18, he was assigned to the Triple-A Scranton/Wilkes-Barre Yankees. Valdés declared for free agency on October 11.

=== Philadelphia Phillies ===
On November 10, 2011, Valdés signed a minor league contract with an invitation to spring training with the Philadelphia Phillies. After opening the 2012 season with the Triple–A Lehigh Valley IronPigs, Valdés' contract was purchased by the Phillies on May 11, adding him to the club's 25-man active roster.

=== Houston Astros ===
Valdés was claimed off waivers by the Houston Astros on October 2, 2013. He was designated for assignment on March 27, 2014. Valdés had his contract purchased by the Astros on April 17, and was placed on the club's 25–man roster. He was designated for assignment on May 4, and sent outright to the Triple–A Oklahoma City RedHawks on May 6.

=== Toronto Blue Jays ===
Valdés was traded to the Toronto Blue Jays on May 19, 2014, for a player to be named later or cash considerations, and he was assigned to the Triple-A Buffalo Bisons. He elected free agency after the season ended.

=== Chunichi Dragons ===
On the December 2, 2014, Valdés signed a $400,000, one–year contract with the Chunichi Dragons of Nippon Professional Baseball.

On September 26, 2017, it was announced that Valdés had been released by the Dragons.

=== Saraperos de Saltillo ===
On April 3, 2018, Valdés signed with the Saraperos de Saltillo of the Mexican League. In 9 starts for the team, he compiled a 7–1 record and 2.50 ERA with 53 strikeouts across 54 innings of work. Valdés was released by Saltillo on July 3.

=== Toros de Tijuana ===
On October 16, 2018, Valdes signed with the Toros de Tijuana of the Mexican League for the 2019 season. On April 30, 2019, during a game against the Saraperos de Saltillo, umpires detected a foreign substance on his left arm, which appeared to be pine tar. He was ejected from the game, and later suspended for 10 games and fined an undisclosed amount for the incident. Valdés was released on November 28.

== See also ==
- List of baseball players who defected from Cuba
