= Mike Jacobs (first baseman) =

American baseball player & coach (born 1980)

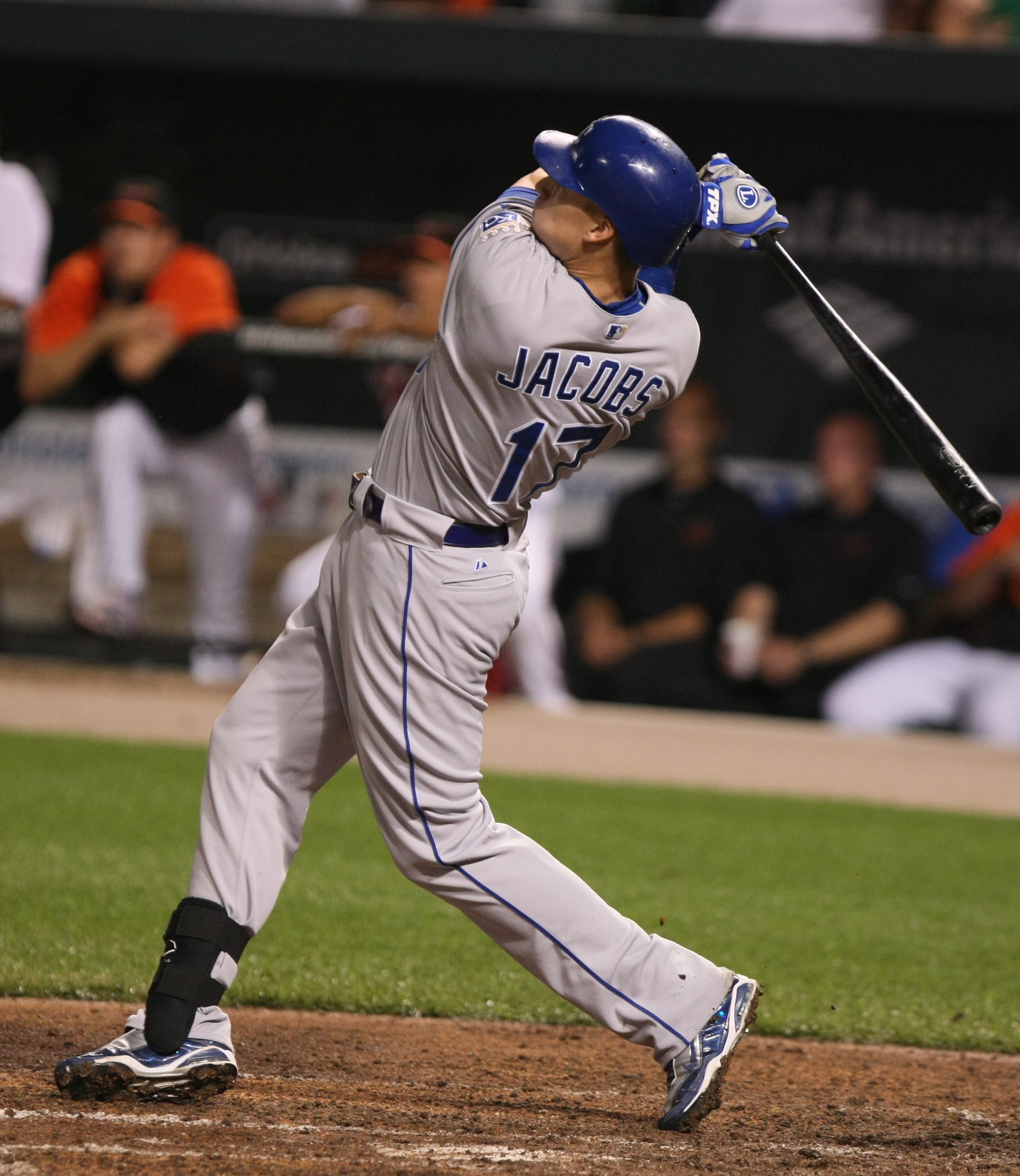
- Jacobs with the Kansas City Royals in 2009
- First baseman
- Born: October 30, 1980 (age 45); Chula Vista, California, U.S.
- Batted: Left Threw: Right

MLB debut
- August 21, 2005, for the New York Mets

Last MLB appearance
- October 3, 2012, for the Arizona Diamondbacks

MLB statistics
- Batting average: .253
- Home runs: 100
- Runs batted in: 312
- Stats at Baseball Reference

Teams
- New York Mets (2005); Florida Marlins (2006–2008); Kansas City Royals (2009); New York Mets (2010); Arizona Diamondbacks (2012)

Michael James Jacobs (born October 30, 1980) is an American former professional baseball first baseman. He played in Major League Baseball (MLB) for the New York Mets, Florida Marlins, Kansas City Royals, and Arizona Diamondbacks.

== Playing career ==
=== Minor Leagues ===
Mike Jacobs graduated from Hilltop High School in Chula Vista and spent one season at Grossmont College in El Cajon, California before being selected by the New York Mets in the 38th round of the 1999 Major League Baseball draft.

Originally signed as a catcher, Jacobs batted .333 with four home runs and 30 runs batted in his first professional season with the Gulf Coast League Mets. He quickly blossomed into a solid power-hitting prospect and, in 2003, after a successful year with the Double-A Binghamton Mets, won an award.

In May 2004, while playing for the Triple-A Norfolk Tides, Jacobs suffered an arm injury and underwent surgery for a torn labrum, which ended his season prematurely. Because of his injury and mediocre defensive skills behind the plate, when Jacobs returned to Binghamton in 2005, he spent much of the season learning to play first base. He batted .321 with 25 home runs and 93 RBIs while learning his new position and going on to win the MVP award.

On December 18, 2010, Jacobs was signed by the Colorado Rockies and played for the Triple-A Colorado Springs Sky Sox. While there, Jacobs was suspended for fifty games after testing positive for HGH. Jacobs was released from the Colorado Rockies on August 18, 2011.

=== New York Mets ===
Jacobs made his major league debut with the Mets on August 21, 2005, hitting a three-run pinch-hit home run against Esteban Loaiza of the Washington Nationals in his first ever Major League at-bat. Jacobs rather instantly assumed the position of everyday first baseman and continued to hit, tallying four home runs through three games, during the Mets' 4-game drubbing of the Arizona Diamondbacks. During this stretch the Mets were able to pull within a half-game of the National League Wild Card lead, but faded quickly, dropping two straight games at home to the Philadelphia Phillies and promptly falling out of the race. Jacobs continued to play well, increasing his stock as a trade chip by slugging a monstrous .710 in his five weeks as a major leaguer.

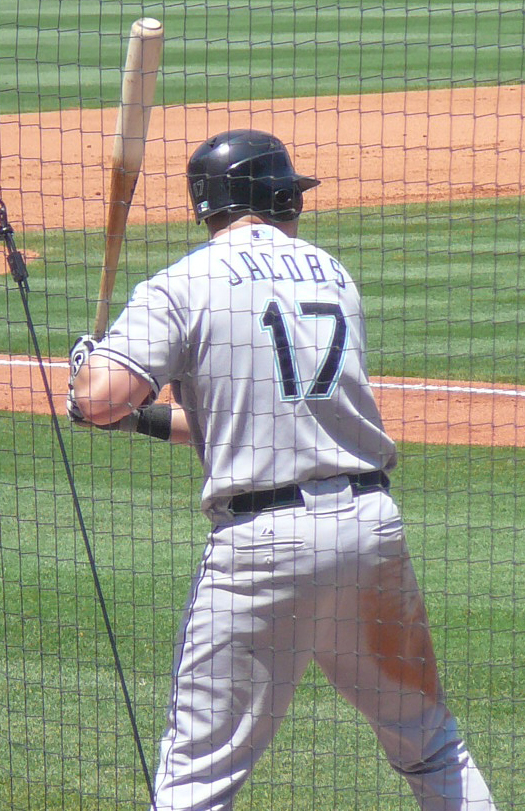
Jacobs with the Florida Marlins in 2008

=== Florida Marlins ===
In only 30 games and 100 at-bats, Jacobs hit an impressive 11 home runs and 23 RBI. Many people penciled him in as the Mets' first baseman for the 2006 season. However, on November 23, 2005, the Mets traded him and a minor league pitcher, Yusmeiro Petit, to the Florida Marlins in exchange for Carlos Delgado and $7 million.

In 2006 with the Marlins, Jacobs played in 136 games while hitting .262 with 20 home runs and 77 RBI. In 2007, he only played in 114 games, but still improved on his batting average hitting .265 that season including 17 home runs and 54 RBI. In 2008 Jacobs saw increased playing time and had a break out season in power with 32 home runs and 93 RBI but his batting average slipped to .247.

=== Kansas City Royals ===
After the 2008 season, Jacobs was traded to the Kansas City Royals for pitcher Leo Núñez. While initially thought to split time at first base with Billy Butler, he was mostly the team's DH due to inconsistent play on the field. Following the season, Jacobs was released by the Royals on December 10.

=== New York Mets (second stint) ===
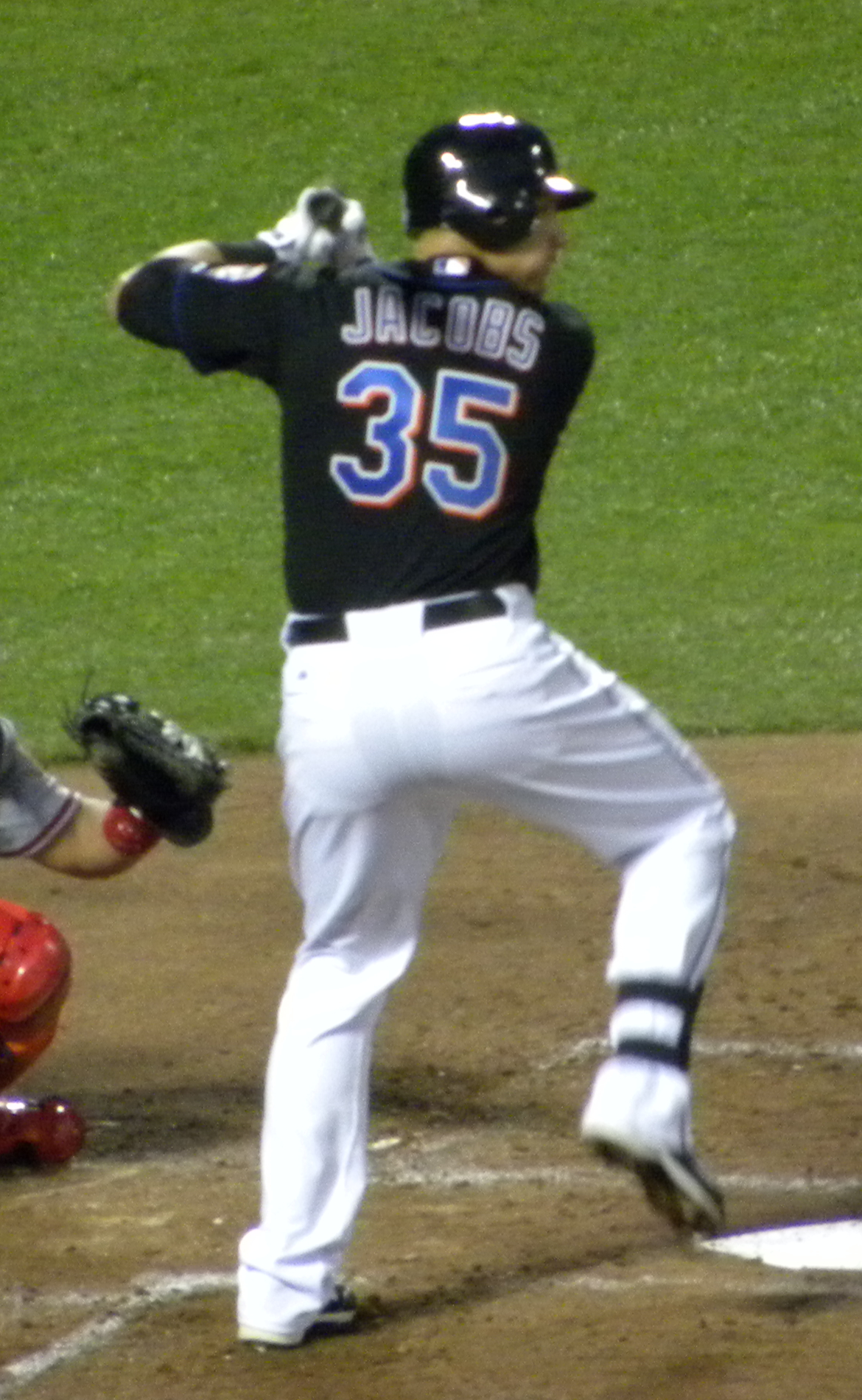
Jacobs with the New York Mets in 2010

On February 10, 2010, the Mets signed Mike Jacobs to a minor league contract. He was selected as the Mets' opening day first baseman after Daniel Murphy went on the disabled list with a strained MCL.

On April 18, Jacobs was designated for assignment.

On April 25, 2010, Jacobs cleared waivers and accepted assignment to the AAA Buffalo Bisons of the International League.

=== Toronto Blue Jays ===
On July 30, 2010, he was acquired by the Toronto Blue Jays for a player to be named later. He was released at the end of the 2010 season.

=== Colorado Rockies ===
Jacobs signed as a minor league free agent with the Colorado Rockies on December 18, 2010.

On August 18, 2011, while playing for the Triple-A Colorado Springs Sky Sox, Jacobs was suspended for 50 games after testing positive for Human Growth Hormone. In response, Jacobs was released by the Rockies.

=== Arizona Diamondbacks ===
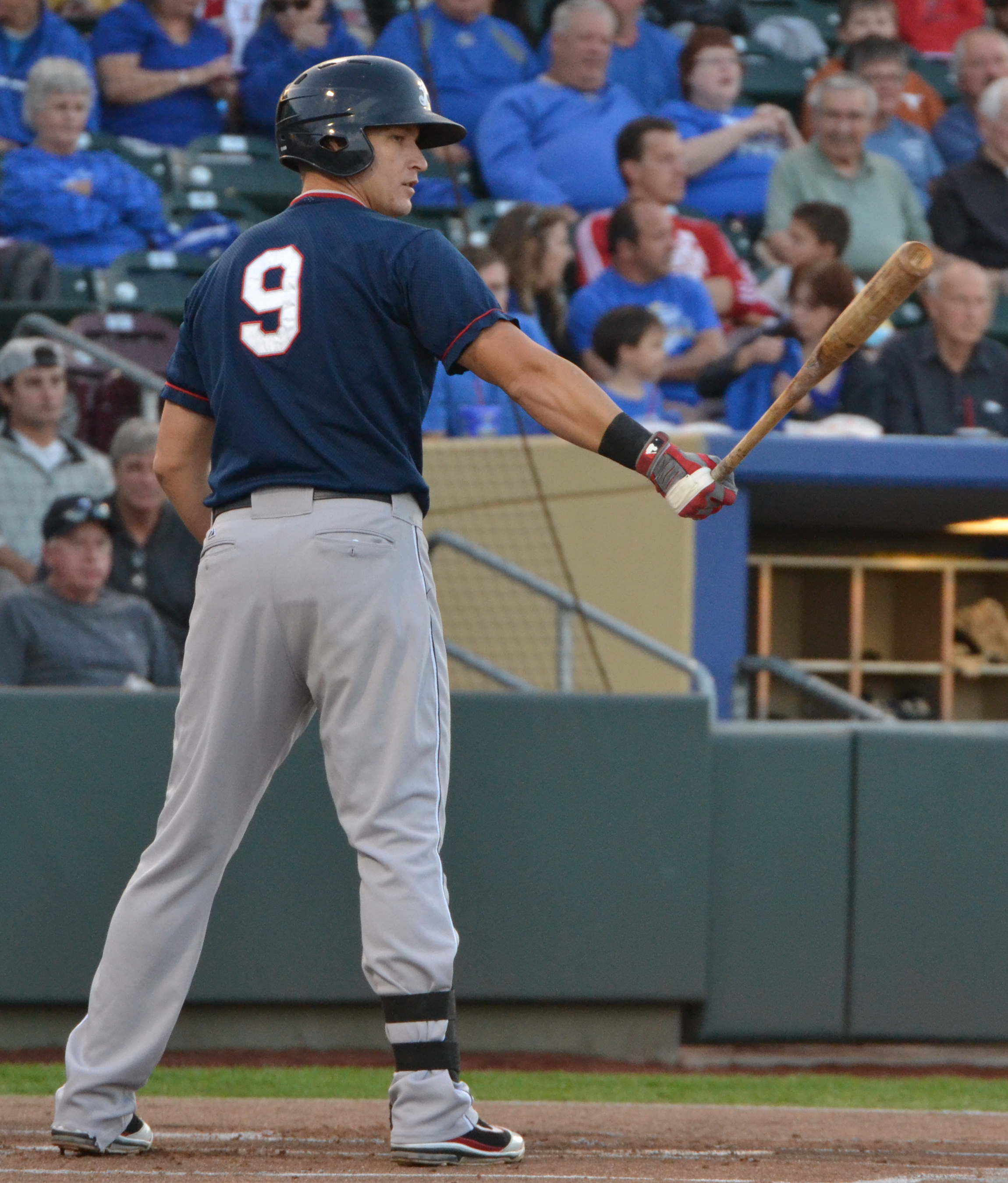
Jacobs during his tenure with for the Reno Aces, the Triple-A affiliate of the Arizona Diamondbacks, in 2012

On January 4, 2012, Jacobs signed a minor league contract with the Arizona Diamondbacks. On September 19, he was called up and played his first Major League game since April 17, 2010. In 13 appearances for the Diamondbacks, Jacobs batted .211/.348/.263 with two RBI and four walks. On October 25, Jacobs was removed from the 40-man roster and sent outright to the Triple-A Reno Aces.

=== Seattle Mariners ===
On January 3, 2013, Jacobs signed a minor league contract with the Seattle Mariners. On March 23, he was released by the Mariners organization.

=== Guerreros de Oaxaca ===
On April 13, 2013, Jacobs signed with the Guerreros de Oaxaca of the Mexican League. In 36 appearances for Oaxaca, he batted .275/.367/.565 with 10 home runs and 30 RBI. Jacobs was released by the Guerreros on June 2.

=== Arizona Diamondbacks (second stint) ===
On June 4, 2013, the Arizona Diamondbacks signed Jacobs back to a minor league contract. Jacobs returned to the Triple-A Reno Aces for the 2014 season; he participated in the Triple-A Home Run Derby as well.

=== Guerreros de Oaxaca (second stint) ===
On March 26, 2015, it was reported that Jacobs had signed on to return to play for the Guerreros de Oaxaca of the Mexican League. In 111 games he hit .276/.353/.436 with 14 home runs, 83 RBI, and two stolen bases.

=== Lancaster Barnstormers ===
On March 25, 2016, Jacobs signed with the Lancaster Barnstormers. In 79 appearances for Lancaster, he hit .236/.320/.326 with five home runs, 24 RBI, and one stolen base.

=== Toros de Tijuana ===
On May 3, 2016, Jacobs signed with the Toros de Tijuana of the Mexican League. He made 43 appearances for the Toros, slashing .295/.412/.514 with six home runs, 21 RBI, and one stolen base. Jacobs was released by Tijuana on June 28.

== Coaching career ==
=== Miami Marlins organization ===
Jacobs retired after 2016 season and was hired by the Miami Marlins to manage their Class A Short-Season Batavia Muckdogs.

Jacobs managed the Clinton LumberKings of the Midwest League in 2019.

For the 2021 season Jacobs managed the Beloit Snappers.

=== Cincinnati Reds organization ===
He was named game planning coach for the Louisville Bats in 2023.

In 2025, Jacobs was named as hitting coach for the Chattanooga Lookouts the Double-A affiliate of the Cincinnati Reds.

== Personal life ==
Jacobs got married in December 2006 and resides in Chula Vista during the baseball offseason. He has four daughters, Havana, Isabella, Sophia and Juliana.

Contrary to popular belief, Jacobs is not Jewish. This was apparently not known to the Marlins when, on May 28, 2006, as part of the team's Jewish Heritage Day promotion, they gave Jacobs T-shirts to young fans who attended the game. In reference to this, Jewish sports podcast Menschwarmers refers to non-Jews with Jewish-sounding names as "Mike Jacobs All Stars."

== See also ==
- List of Major League Baseball players with a home run in their first major league at bat
