= Jon Niese =

American baseball player (born 1986)

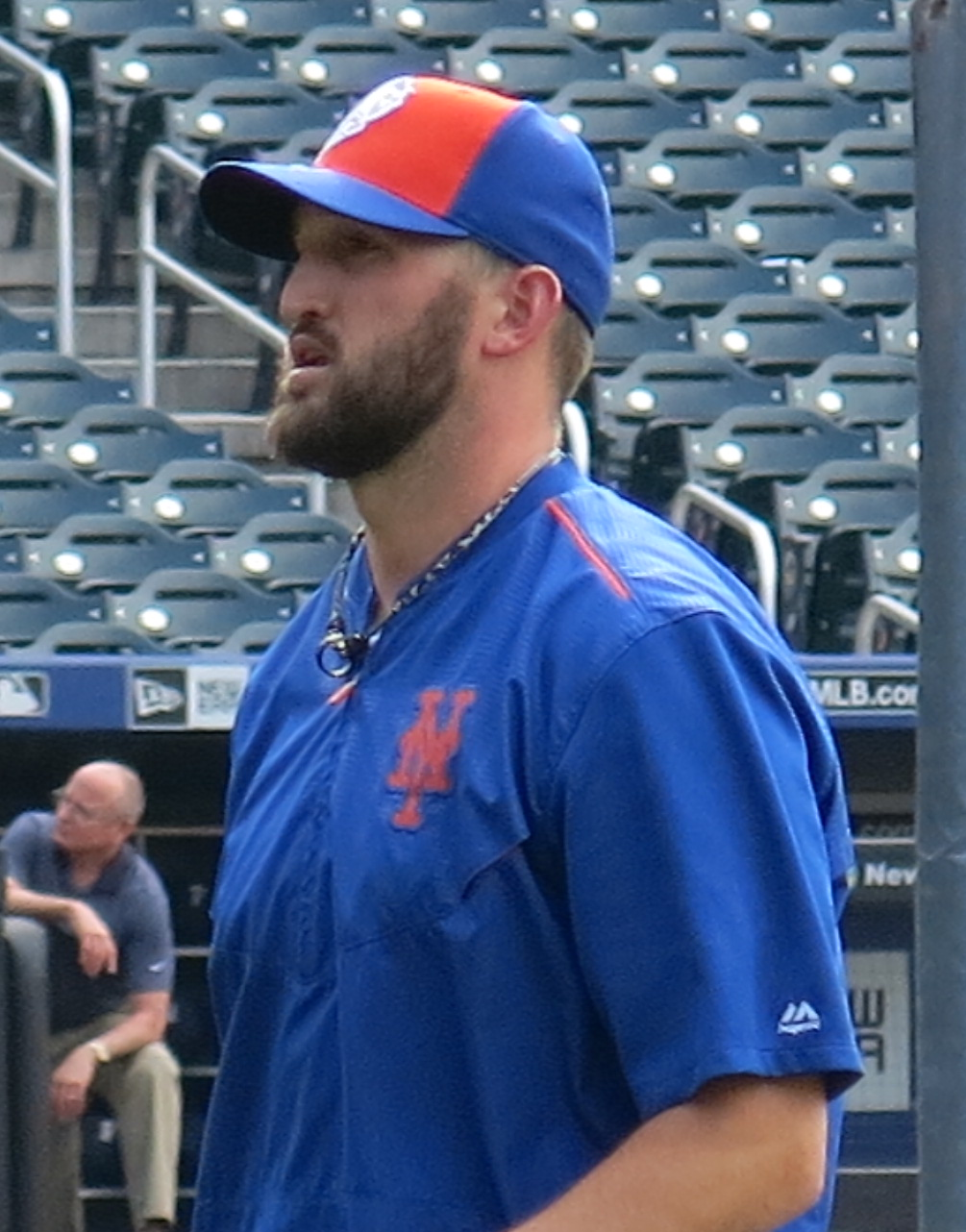
- Niese with the Mets in 2016
- Pitcher
- Born: October 27, 1986 (age 40); Lima, Ohio, U.S.
- Batted: Left Threw: Left

MLB debut
- September 2, 2008, for the New York Mets

Last MLB appearance
- August 23, 2016, for the New York Mets

MLB statistics
- Win–loss record: 69–68
- Earned run average: 4.07
- Strikeouts: 914
- Stats at Baseball Reference

Teams
- New York Mets (2008–2015); Pittsburgh Pirates (2016); New York Mets (2016)

Jonathon Joseph Niese (born October 27, 1986) is an American former professional baseball pitcher. He played in Major League Baseball (MLB) for the New York Mets and Pittsburgh Pirates.

== Early life ==
Niese was born to Jeffery and Annette Niese in Lima, Ohio, on October 27, 1986, the same day that the Mets won their second World Series. He was brought up in Defiance, Ohio, where he attended Defiance High School. He played soccer all four years of high school and was named Third Team All-State during his junior year. In 2004 and 2005, he was named the state's baseball Player of the Year, becoming the first athlete to win the award in consecutive seasons. In Little League (and later in high school), Niese was a teammate of Major League pitcher Chad Billingsley. In the 2005 Major League Baseball draft, the Mets chose Niese 209th overall (ninth pick of the seventh round).

== Professional career ==
=== Minor leagues ===
Niese began his career in the minors in 2005 pitching for the Gulf Coast Mets of the Gulf Coast League, where he pitched in 7 games including 5 starts while earning one win and zero losses. In 2006, Niese was moved up to Single-A where he split time between the St. Lucie Mets in Port St. Lucie, Florida, and the Hagerstown Suns. In 2007, he pitched the entire season for the St. Lucie Mets where he went 11–7 with a 4.39 earned run average (ERA). In 2008, Niese gained another level beginning the year with the Double-A Binghamton Mets.

Niese was promoted to the Triple-A New Orleans Zephyrs in July 2008. He made his debut for the Zephyrs on July 30, 2008, striking out seven and allowing only one run in seven innings.

=== New York Mets ===
==== 2008 ====
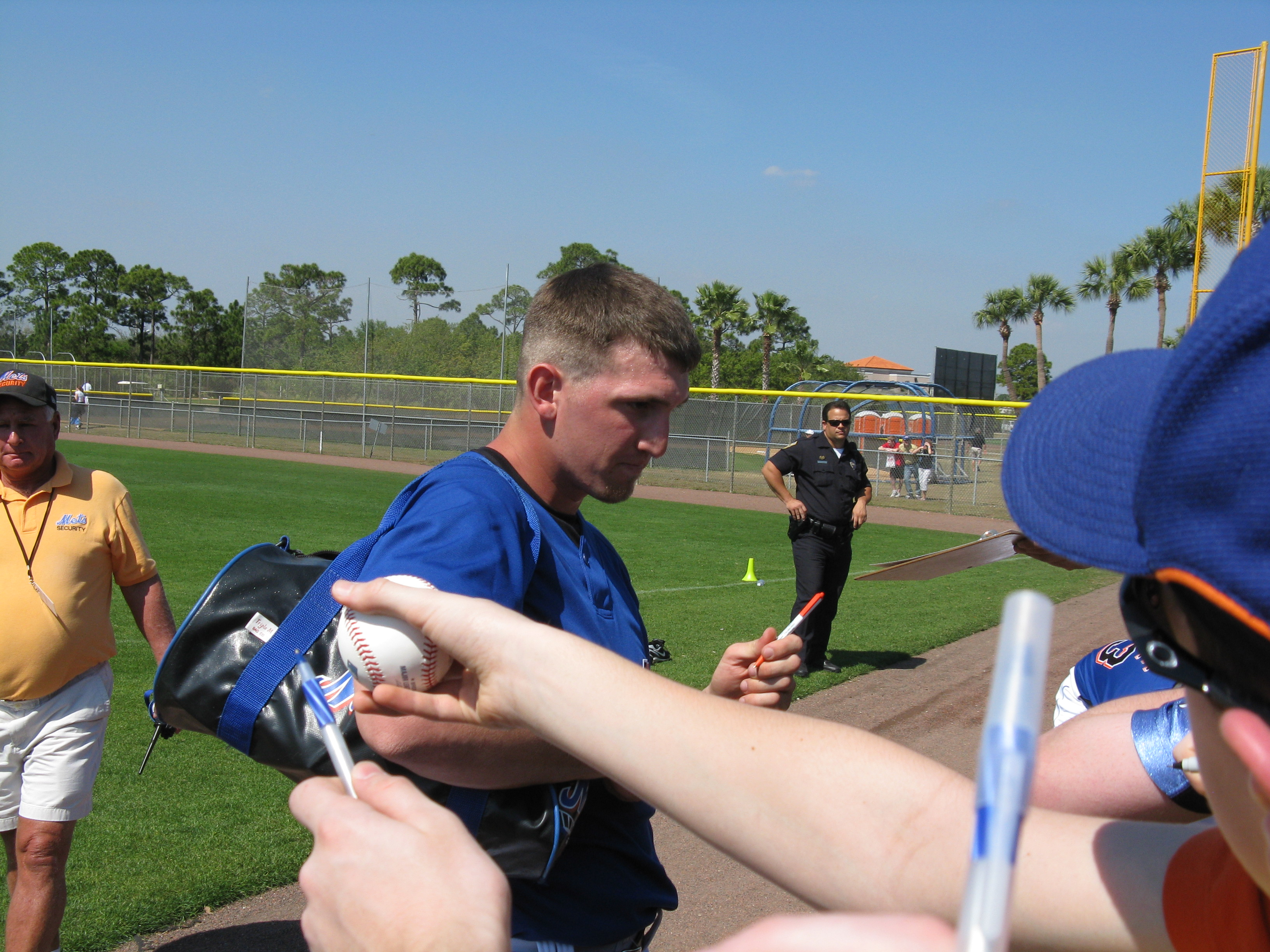
Niese signing autographs in the Mets' spring training facility

Niese made his major league debut on September 2, 2008, against the Milwaukee Brewers. He gave up a home run to the first batter he faced, Rickie Weeks. It was the first time in Mets history that a pitcher gave up a home run to the first batter he faced in his career. He ended the day giving up five runs in three innings. In his second start, on September 13, 2008, he earned his first Major League victory pitching eight shutout innings against the Atlanta Braves in a 5–0 victory. In his last start of the season he lost to the Chicago Cubs, ending his inaugural season at 1–1 with a 7.07 ERA in 3 starts.

==== 2009 ====
On May 6, Niese was called up from Triple-A Buffalo Bisons to replace the injured starting pitcher Oliver Perez. His first start of the season was a success. He pitched 6 innings, giving up two runs, no walks, and struck out 5 against the Pittsburgh Pirates. On July 25, Niese replaced the injured Fernando Nieve in the starting rotation pitching seven innings and giving up only one run against the Houston Astros. Then on August 5, Niese was injured trying to reach for a ball at first base against the St. Louis Cardinals. After taking a test pitch, he collapsed on his right leg and was taken out of the game. He suffered a complete tear of the hamstring tendon and had season-ending surgery. In 5 major league starts, Niese went 1–1 with a 4.21 ERA in 25.2 innings.

==== 2010 ====
The 2010 campaign was Niese's first full season as major league starter. He finished at 9–10, with a 4.20 ERA in 173.2 innings pitched. He was named one of the five starting pitchers on Baseball America's 2010 All-Rookie Team. The most memorable game of the season was on June 10, when Niese pitched a complete game one-hit shutout against the San Diego Padres. The only hit was a Chris Denorfia double in the third inning. After the game Mets' catcher Rod Barajas said (about Niese) "I can't tell you how impressive and how good this guy can be." The one-hitter was only the second time in New York Mets history that a pitcher has pitched to one batter above the minimum. Niese went on to pitch his second complete game against the Pittsburgh Pirates on August 21, yet it was a 5 inning rain shortened game. Niese enjoyed much success nearing the end of August, compiling an 8–5 record with a 3.33 ERA over his first 23 starts. Yet, Niese went 1–5 over his last 7 starts of the season and inflated his ERA to 4.20.

==== 2011 ====
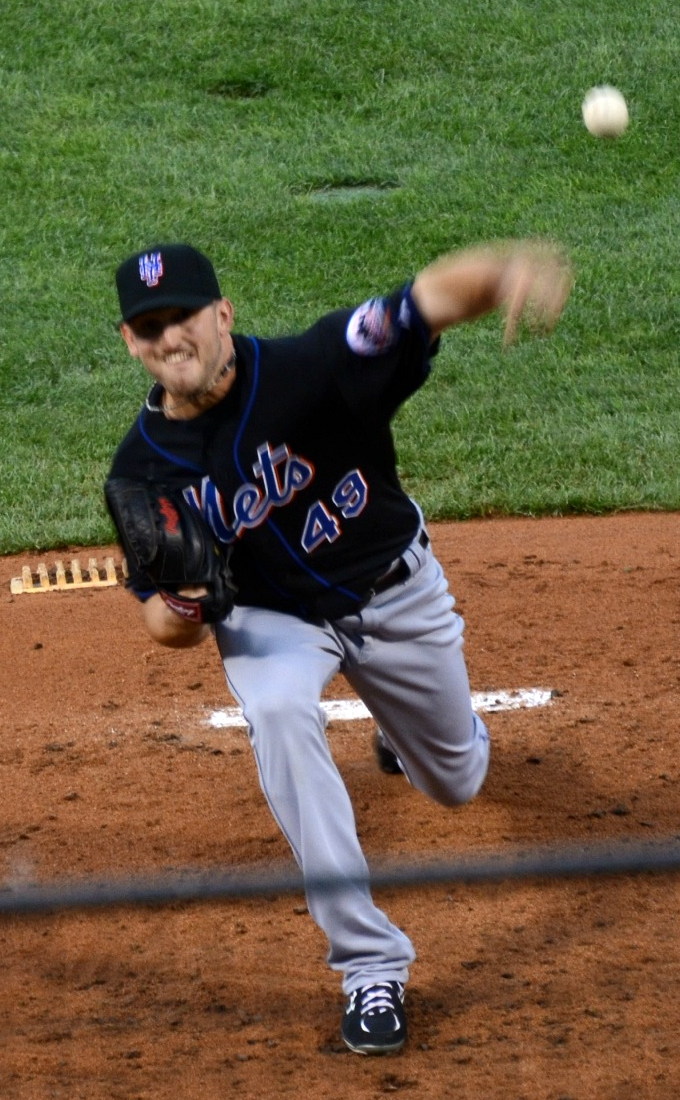
Niese pitching for the Mets in 2011

Niese ended his second major league season at 11–11, with a 4.40 ERA in 157.1 innings pitched. His season was cut short after injuring his rib cage on August 23. Before his injury, Terry Collins was going to limit him to 180 innings pitched. To begin the season, Niese struggled posting a 1–4 record through April. Yet, Niese improved to 10–8 through July before faltering in August to end at 11–11.

==== 2012 ====
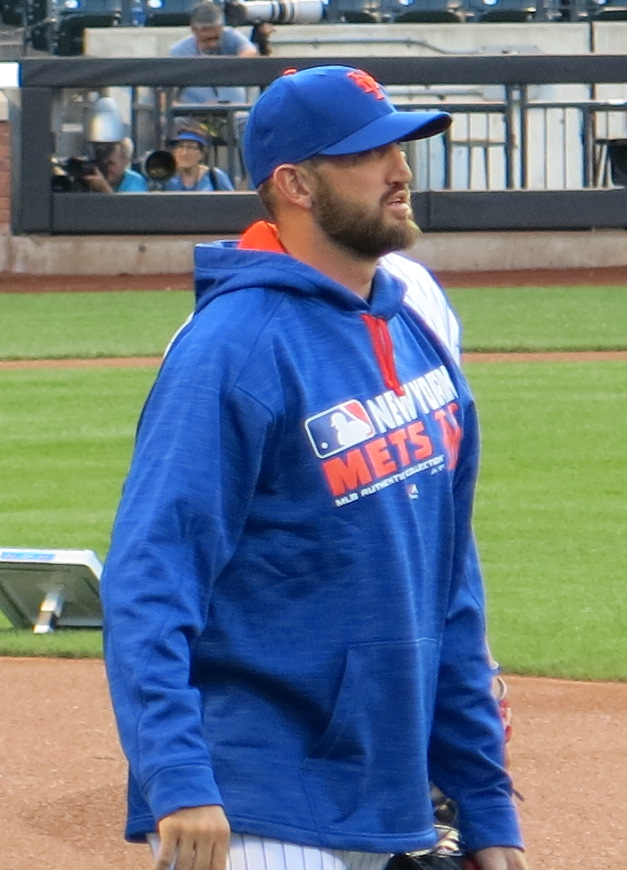
Niese with the Mets in 2016

Before the season began Niese had rhinoplasty performed at the expense of former teammate Carlos Beltrán, who offered to pay for the procedure. Niese has stated that since the procedure his breathing has improved. Jon Niese and the Mets agreed to a 5-year $25.5 million contract extension on April 4. On June 3, Niese struck-out a career high 10 batters against the St. Louis Cardinals to place the Mets in a three-way tie for 1st place.

On September 29, Niese completed his final game of the season with seven innings of one-run ball against the Atlanta Braves, finishing with a 13–9 record and 3.40 ERA. It was the first season that he completed without struggles in September.

==== 2013 ====
Niese was named the Mets opening day starter for 2013 due to an injury to Johan Santana. On August 27 he hit a three-run double and allowed only three hits and one walk over nine scoreless innings against the Philadelphia Phillies at Citi Field, becoming one of only 24 pitchers in the National League to pitch a shutout in the 2013 season. He missed several starts in 2013 due to injuries to his rotator cuff.

==== 2014 ====
Niese began the 2014 season on the disabled list due to inflammation in his pitching elbow. Upon returning from the injury, he performed well in 66 innings pitched but was forced back on the DL again in early July. He finished the season with a 3.40 ERA in 30 starts, rather consistent with his career numbers. In 2014, Niese was the longest-tenured Mets pitcher on the team's roster. Only he and Bobby Parnell remained on the pitching staff from the team's last winning season in 2008.

==== 2015 ====
Niese made adjustments to his pitching motion during Spring Training in order to alleviate some of the strain which had led to injuries to his pitching arm in the past. In a game on April 24 in the Subway Series at New Yankee Stadium in which Niese was not scheduled to appear, he was ejected from the dugout for arguing balls and strikes with home plate umpire Doug Eddings during a Juan Lagares plate appearance. It was Niese's first career MLB ejection.

=== Pittsburgh Pirates ===
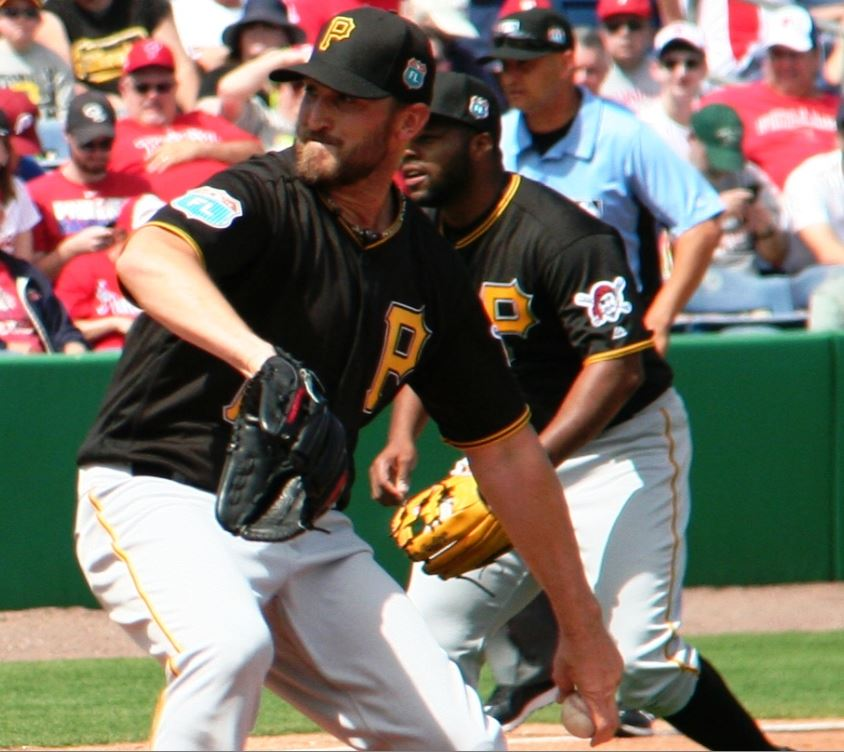
Niese with the Pirates in 2016

On December 9, 2015, the Mets traded Niese to the Pittsburgh Pirates for Neil Walker. Niese began the season in the Pirates rotation but after the all star break he was sent to the bullpen. He finished his stint with Pittsburgh with an 8-6 record and a 4.91 ERA in 21 games, 16 starts.

=== Return to Mets ===
On August 1, 2016, the Pirates traded Niese back to the Mets in exchange for Antonio Bastardo. On August 24, Niese picked up only one out in a start at Busch Stadium before exiting with knee pain. The next day, the Mets placed him on the disabled list and announced that he would undergo arthroscopic surgery on his knee. Following the season, the Mets declined their option on Niese's contract, paying him a $500,000 buyout and granting him free agency. Niese was the only MLB pitcher to give up two bases-loaded triples in 2016, one for the Pirates and one for the Mets. He became a free agent following the season.

=== New York Yankees ===
On February 20, 2017, Niese signed a minor league contract with the New York Yankees. He was released on March 25. He re-signed on a new minor league contract three days later and then was released a second time on June 7.

=== Texas Rangers ===
On January 30, 2018, Niese signed a minor league contract with the Texas Rangers. He was released on March 16.

=== Seattle Mariners ===
On April 1, 2019, Niese was drafted by the Long Island Ducks of the Atlantic League of Professional Baseball at the 2019 ALPB Player Showcase. On April 24, his contract was purchased by the Seattle Mariners and he was assigned to the Triple-A Tacoma Rainiers. In 14 games (13 starts) for the Rainiers, he compiled a 4–2 record and 5.12 ERA with 38 strikeouts across 70 1/3 innings pitched. Niese was released by the Mariners organization on July 15.

== Pitching style ==
Niese throws five pitches:

- Four-seam fastball (89–92 mph)
- Two-seam fastball (89–91)
- Cutter (87–89)
- Curveball (73–77)
- Changeup (83–86)

Niese uses all five of his pitches against right-handed hitters, but he tends not to use the two-seamer and changeup against lefties, or in 2-strike counts.

== Personal life ==
Jon Niese is married to Leah Eckman. They have two children.

On March 26, 2012 Cardinals center fielder and ex-teammate Carlos Beltran paid $10,000 for Niese to get a nose job. Niese's motivation for the nose job originally was cosmetic, but he said he has been breathing better since the elective procedure. Said Niese: "He wanted me to have a new nose. So he offered to pay for it. I was just like, 'All right.' Then it turned into seeing doctors and to getting it fixed."
