= Tobi Stoner =

German baseball player (born 1984)

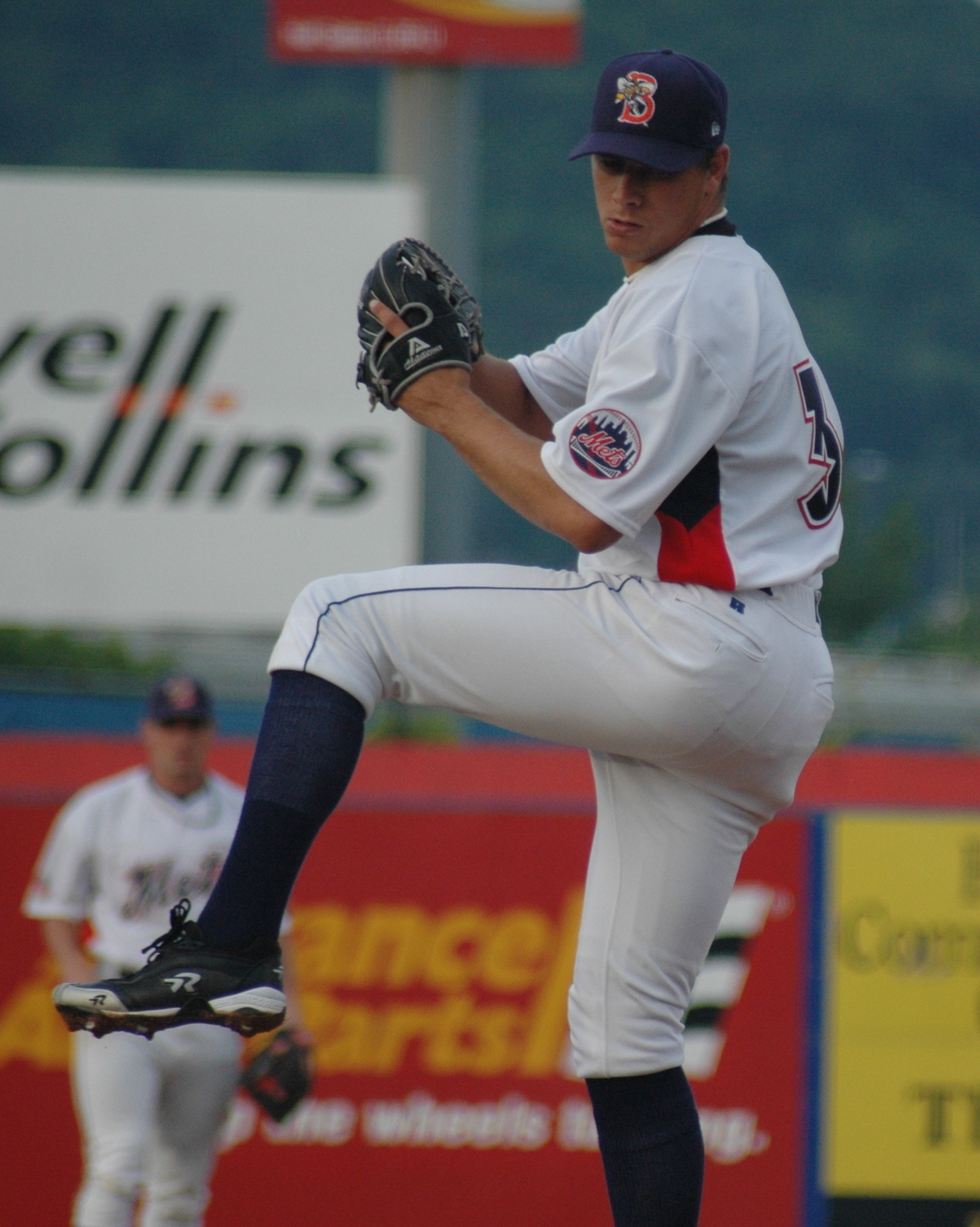
- Stoner with the Binghamton Mets in 2008
- Pitcher
- Born: December 3, 1984 (age 40); Landstuhl, West Germany
- Batted: Switch Threw: Right

MLB debut
- September 8, 2009, for the New York Mets

Last MLB appearance
- April 18, 2010, for the New York Mets

MLB statistics
- Win–loss record: 0–1
- Earned run average: 3.97
- Strikeouts: 5
- Stats at Baseball Reference

Teams
- New York Mets (2009–2010)

Tobi Neal Stoner (born December 3, 1984) is a former Major League Baseball pitcher who last played for the New York Mets.

== Early life and education ==
Stoner was born in Landstuhl, Germany. He attended Garrett College in McHenry, Maryland to play junior college baseball and then played his last two years at Davis & Elkins College in Elkins, West Virginia, graduating in 2006. The Mets then drafted Stoner in the 16th round of the 2006 MLB draft.

Stoner, a 2002 graduate of Southern Garrett High School in Oakland Maryland, had his baseball jersey #13 retired by the school in 2010.

== Baseball career ==
Stoner was called up to the Mets Major League club on September 8, 2009, and on April 18, 2010. He pitched in four games as a reliever for the Mets in 2009 and made one relief appearance in 2010.

On April 10, 2012, Stoner signed with the Bridgeport Bluefish of the Atlantic League of Professional Baseball. He was released on June 23. In 11 starts 59.1 innings he struggled immensely going 1-8 with a 7.43 ERA and 38 strikeouts.

On July 3, 2012, Stoner signed with the Somerset Patriots of the Atlantic League of Professional Baseball. In 1 start 5 innings he went 1-0 giving up 6 hits 4 earned runs (7.20 ERA) with 9 strikeouts.
