= Pat Misch =

American baseball player (born 1981)

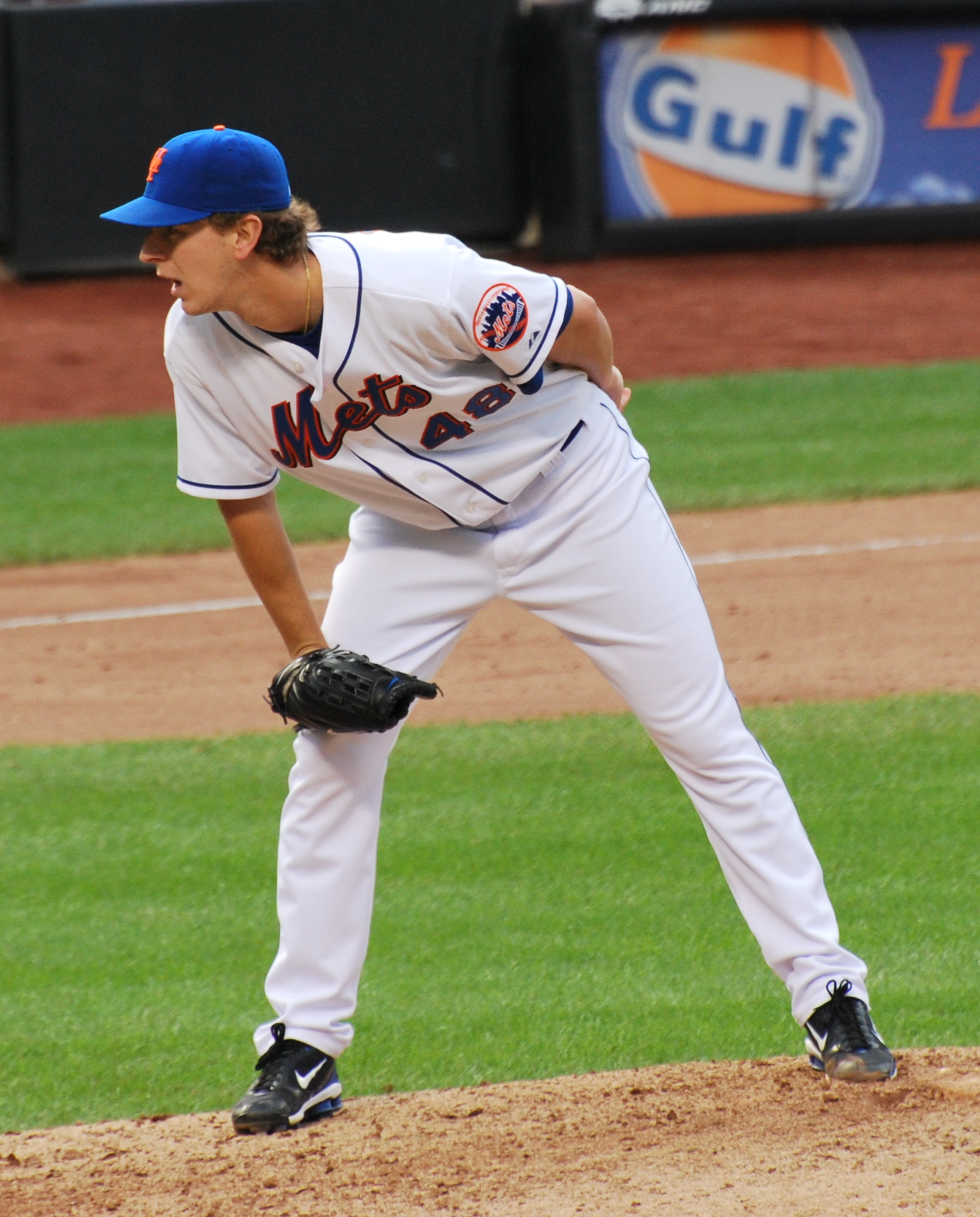
- Misch with the New York Mets
- Pitcher
- Born: August 18, 1981 (age 45); Northbrook, Illinois, U.S.
- Batted: Right Threw: Left

Professional debut
- MLB: September 21, 2006, for the San Francisco Giants
- CPBL: August 15, 2015, for the Lamigo Monkeys
- NPB: April 9, 2016, for the Orix Buffaloes

Last appearance
- MLB: May 26, 2011, for the New York Mets
- CPBL: October 12, 2015, for the Lamigo Monkeys
- NPB: July 11, 2016, for the Orix Buffaloes

MLB statistics
- Win–loss record: 4–15
- Earned run average: 4.80
- Strikeouts: 116

CPBL statistics
- Win–loss record: 6–1
- Earned run average: 2.96
- Strikeouts: 50

NPB statistics
- Win–loss record: 0–1
- Earned run average: 8.44
- Strikeouts: 2
- Stats at Baseball Reference

Teams
- San Francisco Giants (2006–2009); New York Mets (2009–2011); Lamigo Monkeys (2015); Orix Buffaloes (2016)

Career highlights and awards
- Pitched a CPBL postseason no-hitter on October 25, 2015; Taiwan Series champion (2015)

Patrick Theodore Joseph Misch (born August 18, 1981) is an American former professional baseball pitcher. He pitched in Major League Baseball (MLB) for the San Francisco Giants and New York Mets.

== Early life ==
Misch was born in Northbrook, Illinois. He is a graduate of Glenbrook North High School in Northbrook and was twice named to the All-Mid-American Conference Second Team while attending Western Michigan University. In 2001 and 2002, he played collegiate summer baseball with the Falmouth Commodores of the Cape Cod Baseball League.

== Professional career ==
=== San Francisco Giants ===
He was selected by Houston in the fifth round (161st overall selection) of the 2002 Major League Baseball draft, but opted not to sign with the Astros. The San Francisco Giants made him their seventh round selection (the 213th player selected) in the 2003 Major League Baseball draft and signed him June 8 of that year.

In his first four seasons in the Giants farm system (through the end of 2006), Misch compiled a 30-28 won-lost record and a 3.52 ERA in 96 games (95 starts). He made his major league debut September 21, 2006, pitching a scoreless inning of relief and striking out the first batter he faced—Milwaukee Brewers' rookie left fielder Drew Anderson.

Misch began the 2007 season pitching out of the bullpen of the former Giants' Triple-A, Pacific Coast League affiliate Fresno Grizzlies. He was recalled to San Francisco July 3 when reliever Vinnie Chulk was placed on the bereavement list.

Misch was the starting pitcher for the Giants on August 4, 2007, against the San Diego Padres. It was in this game that Barry Bonds hit his 755th home run, tying Hank Aaron for most all-time career home runs.

=== New York Mets ===
Misch was claimed off waivers by the New York Mets from the Giants on June 5, 2009, and was called up on June 22. On September 3, he achieved his first win as a starting pitcher, holding the Colorado Rockies to two hits in 6 and 2/3 innings. In his previous start, Misch became only the second pitcher in major league history to begin his careers with 12 starts in which his team lost all 12 games. The first pitcher to do this was John Cummings of the 1993-1994 Mariners.

On September 27, 2009, Misch threw his first complete game shutout against the Florida Marlins, it was also the Mets' first complete game shutout of the year.

The Buffalo Bisons gave Misch the Most Valuable Pitcher award for the 2010 season.

Misch had his contract purchased by the Mets on April 16, 2011, after Chris Young was placed on the disabled list. He was designated for assignment the following day to make room for Dillon Gee. The Mets purchased his contract again on May 8, however, he was designated for assignment again on May 27. After the 2011 season, he elected for free agency.

=== Philadelphia Phillies/Detroit Tigers ===
He signed a minor league contract with the Philadelphia Phillies on November 29, 2011. Misch joined the Detroit Tigers on a minor league contract in January 2013, underwent Tommy John surgery in August 2013, and left the organization at the end of the year. He spent most of 2014 recovering from the operation and the 2014–15 Puerto Rico Baseball League season pitching for the Cangrejeros de Santurce. Misch finished 0–1 with a 3.41 ERA, and won a league championship.

=== Lamigo Monkeys ===
Misch attempted a comeback by signing a minor league contract with the Miami Marlins in January 2015. He played most of the season with the Triple A New Orleans Zephyrs and set a Pacific Coast League record on May 4, 2015, by hitting four straight batters with pitches in the first inning. The Marlins released Misch in July. He subsequently signed with the Lancaster Barnstormers of the Atlantic League of Professional Baseball, and was sold to the Lamigo Monkeys of Taiwan's Chinese Professional Baseball League later that month. Misch started Game One of the 2015 Taiwan Series, pitching seven innings and yielding three earned runs in an 8–6 victory. He also started Game 4, throwing 80 pitches over three innings. The Monkeys trailed the Chinatrust Brothers 3–1 in the series, but forced a seventh and final game, which Misch won with a no-hitter. This was the first no-hitter in the Taiwan Series. The 11–0 final score was also the largest margin of victory in series history.

=== Milwaukee Brewers ===
Misch signed a minor league contract with the Milwaukee Brewers on January 8, 2016. He was released on February 18, 2016.

=== Orix Buffaloes ===
Misch signed a one-year contract with the Orix Buffaloes of Nippon Professional Baseball on February 23, 2016. The deal is worth $550,000 and includes performance incentives.

=== Southern Maryland Blue Crabs ===
On March 30, 2017, Misch signed with the Southern Maryland Blue Crabs of the Atlantic League of Professional Baseball. According to the Atlantic League web site, Southern Maryland released him May 4, 2017.
