= Status lists of players in professional sports =

Some team sports put players on different official lists according to circumstances for that player, for example if they are injured. There can be different rules for players on different lists, and the details vary between sports.

== NFL ==
- Injured reserve
- Physically Unable to Perform
- Suspended

== MLB ==
- Active list – also called the active roster, it is composed of the players who are currently eligible to play for their major league team. These players are the only ones who may take the field in a game at any time. The active roster limit is currently 26 players (historically, 25 players), although exceptions exist (for example, MLB allows teams playing a doubleheader to have one additional player active). Players on the active roster are also on the 40-man roster.
- Reserve list – the reserve list (or extended roster) is commonly known as the 40-man roster. Players on this list are eligible to be added to their team's active roster. Decisions to move eligible players on and off the active roster are made by a team's manager or general manager, based on various factors such as performance and injury. Reserve players not on the active roster typically are in a team's farm system, often at the highest level (Triple-A).
- Bereavement list – major league players may be placed on the bereavement list due to severe illness or death of that player's or his spouse's immediate family. Minimum period is 3 days, maximum 7 days. Players on this list are counted towards the Reserve List Limit but not the Active List Limit.
- Designated list – when the Active or Reserve List limit has been reached for a particular club and the club desires to add additional players, a corresponding number must be designated for assignment, meaning they must be removed from the 40-man roster by being “outrighted” to the minor leagues, traded, or released within 10 days. Players designated for assignment do not count towards active or reserve list limits, but cannot participate in games until released or assigned.
- Injured list – 15-day (historically 10-day, and historically known as the "disabled list"): The player must remain off the active roster for a minimum number of calendar days, starting on the day following the player's last game. 60-day: Same rules apply, however, this may only be used when the team's 40-man roster is full. Any player placed on the 60-day injured list after August 1 may not play for the remainder of the season, including any post-season game.
- Emergency injured list – maximum number of players on list at one time-no limit. Minimum period of inactivity-sixty (60) calendar days. Players placed on this list after August 1 shall remain there for the balance of the season. This list may only be used when a club is at the maximum limit of 40 players.
- Disqualified list – players who violate their player contract. Players on this list do not count towards the Reserved List or Active List limits. A player may remain on this list for two consecutive years before he is removed. A player who is "Disqualified" is deemed "suspended" on the official MLB transaction report.
- Ineligible list – players found guilty of serious misconduct (gambling, tanking, bribery, violence to umpires). Players on this list do not count towards the Reserved List or Active List limits. A player may remain on this list for two consecutive years before he is removed.
- Military list – players with definite orders to report for military service. Players on this list do not count towards the Reserved List or Active List limits. Upon learning that a player has separated from military service, a team must immediately notify the Commissioner.
- Restricted list – players who are not available, either because of a player's own action (such as declining to play or getting arrested) or when "unusual circumstances exist." Players on this list do not get paid, and do not count towards the Reserved List or Active List limits. A player may remain on this list for two consecutive years before he is removed. Often, placing a player on the Restricted List is akin to releasing him without fully relinquishing his rights.
- Suspended list – player may be suspended by his club or the league for insubordination, misconduct, or failure to report in playing condition. A player on this lists counts both towards the Reserve List and the Active List limits.
- Temporarily inactive list – players not able to render active service due to: (1) necessary temporary absence due to family member's illness; (2) absence excused for personal obligations; or (3) awaiting release for the purpose of allowing the player to sign with a foreign league. Minimum placement is 3 days. Players on the TIA count towards the Reserve List limit but not the Active List limit.
- Voluntarily retired list – player under contract who retires is placed on the Voluntarily Retired List. If a player desires to return, he may not be reinstated until 60 days after the season in which he retired. He may also not play baseball elsewhere without obtaining consent from the club owning his rights. Players on this list do not count towards the Reserved List or Active List limits. A player may remain on this list for two consecutive years before he is removed.

== NBA ==
- Active List
- Suspended list

== NHL ==
- Injured reserve list
