= Hisanori Takahashi =

Japanese baseball player (born 1975)

Hisanori Takahashi 高橋 尚成
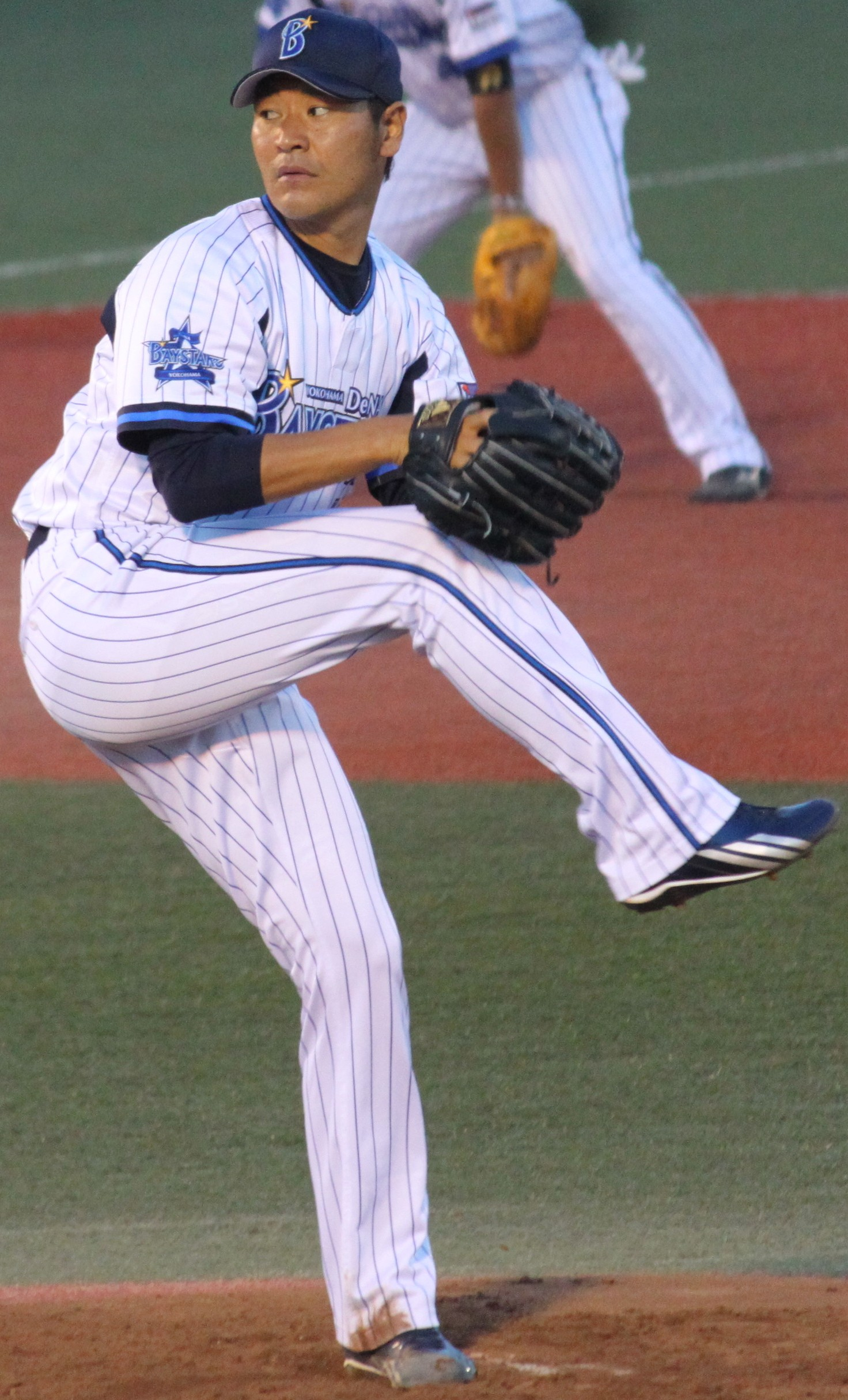
- Takahashi with the Yokohama DeNA BayStars in 2014
- Pitcher
- Born: April 2, 1975 (age 51); Sumida, Tokyo, Japan
- Batted: Left Threw: Left

Professional debut
- NPB: April 6, 2000, for the Yomiuri Giants
- MLB: April 7, 2010, for the New York Mets

Last appearance
- MLB: April 11, 2013, for the Chicago Cubs
- NPB: October 2, 2015, for the Yokohama DeNA BayStars

NPB statistics
- Win–loss record: 79–73
- Earned run average: 3.79
- Strikeouts: 1,069

MLB statistics
- Win–loss record: 14–12
- Earned run average: 3.99
- Strikeouts: 221
- Stats at Baseball Reference

Teams
- Yomiuri Giants (2000–2009); New York Mets (2010); Los Angeles Angels of Anaheim (2011–2012); Pittsburgh Pirates (2012); Chicago Cubs (2013); Yokohama DeNA BayStars (2014–2015)
Medals
Men's baseball
Representing Japan
Asian Games
Silver medal – second place	1998 Bangkok	Team competition

Hisanori Takahashi (高橋 尚成, Takahashi Hisanori; born April 2, 1975) is a Japanese former professional baseball pitcher. He began his professional career in NPB with the Yomiuri Giants, and played in Major League Baseball for the New York Mets, Los Angeles Angels of Anaheim, Pittsburgh Pirates, and Chicago Cubs.

== Career ==
=== Nippon Professional Baseball ===
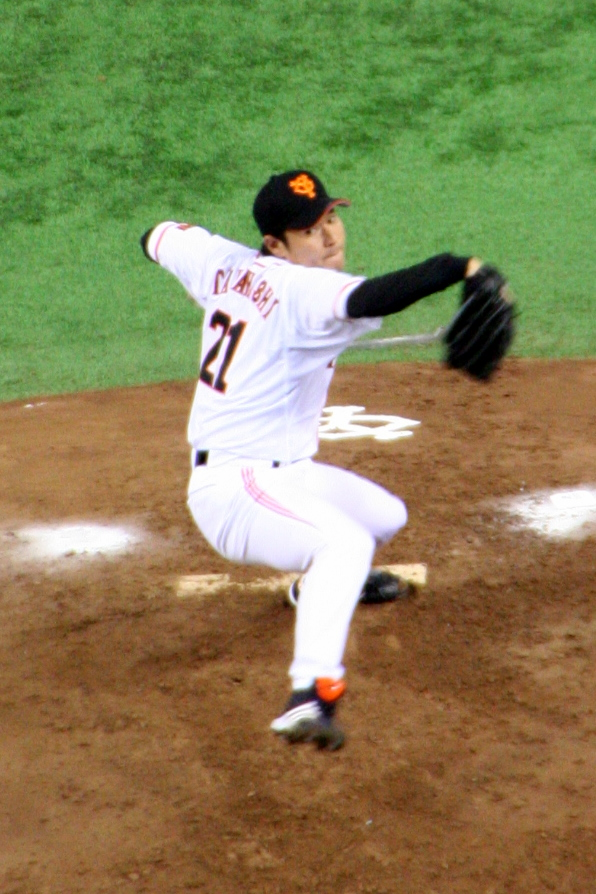
Takahashi with the Yomiuri Giants in 2007

Takahashi debuted in Nippon Professional Baseball with the Yomiuri Giants in 2000. He was a finesse starting pitcher in Japan, featuring an 86–89 mph fastball (tops out at 92 mph), slider, curveball, and a screwball as his out pitch.

=== Major League Baseball ===
==== New York Mets ====
On February 11, 2010, Takahashi signed a minor league contract with the New York Mets. Takahashi included a clause in his contract stipulating that the Mets must release him to free agency by October 31, 2010. Takahashi started the 2010 season in the Mets' bullpen. On May 21, he made his first appearance as a starting pitcher against the New York Yankees, picking up a no decision with 6 scoreless innings. With the loss of Francisco Rodríguez to injury, Takahashi served as the closer for the Mets and recorded his first major league save on August 16 against the Houston Astros.

==== Los Angeles Angels of Anaheim ====
On December 2, 2010, Takahashi signed a two-year $8 million contract with the Los Angeles Angels of Anaheim.

On July 28, 2012, Takahashi was optioned to the Triple-A Salt Lake Bees to make room for recently acquired starting pitcher Zack Greinke.

==== Pittsburgh Pirates ====
Takahashi was claimed by the Pittsburgh Pirates in August 2012. The Pirates granted Takahashi his unconditional release on October 31, 2012.

==== Chicago Cubs ====
On December 27, 2012 he signed a minor league contract with the Chicago Cubs that included an invitation to spring training. He made the opening day roster as a relief pitcher. He was designated for assignment on April 16, 2013.

==== Colorado Rockies ====
On June 22, 2013 Takahashi was traded to the Rockies for a player to be named later. Takahashi elected to become a free agent following the season after compiling a 6.66 ERA over 25.2 innings pitched with the Triple-A Colorado Springs Sky Sox.

=== Yokohama DeNA BayStars ===
Following the 2013 season, Takahashi signed with the Yokohama DeNA BayStars. In September 2015, Takahashi announced that he would retire from baseball following the 2015 season. He failed to record a win in either of his two seasons in Yokohama.
