= Fernando Nieve =

Venezuelan baseball player (born 1982)

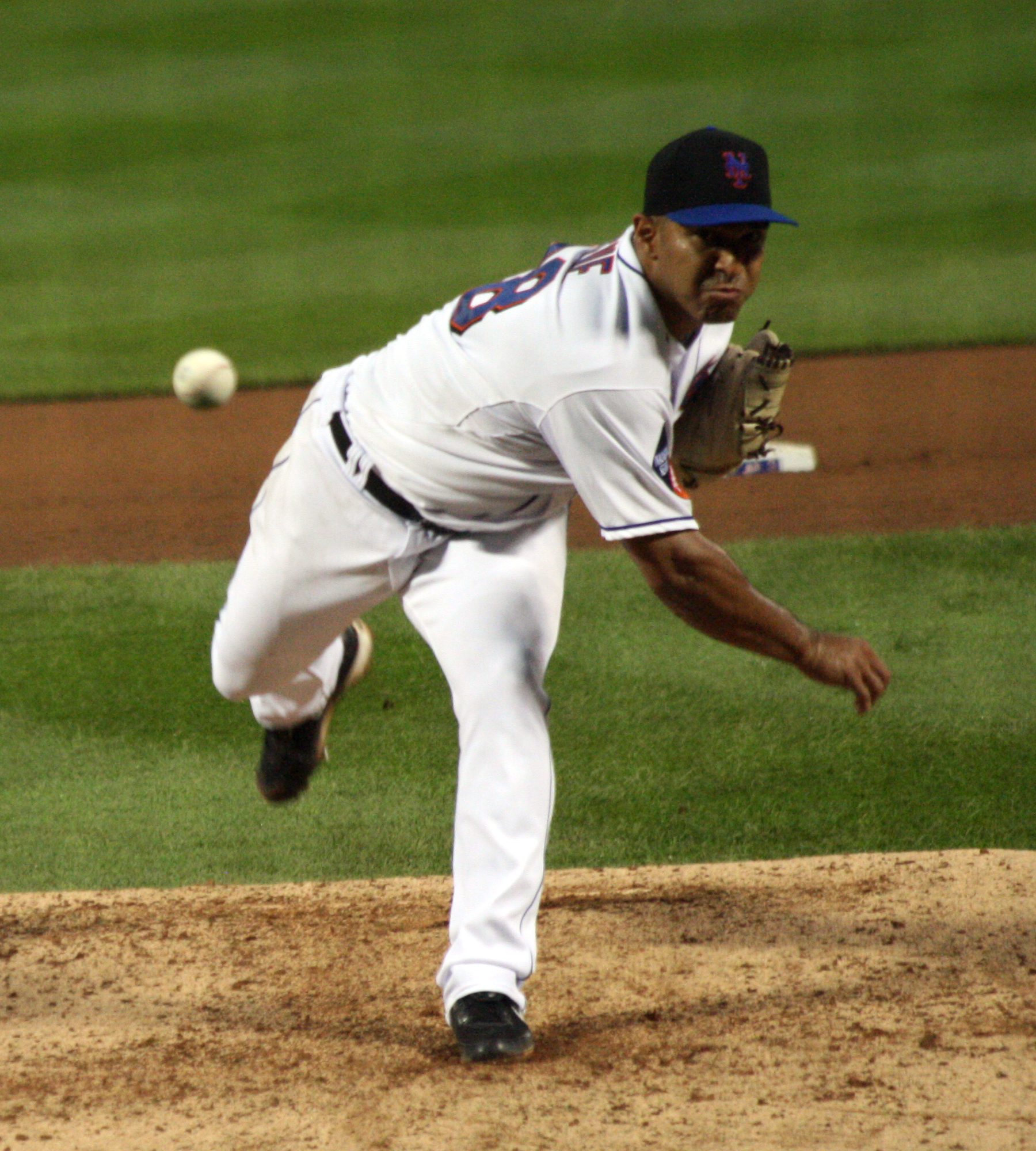
- Nieve while with the New York Mets
- Pitcher
- Born: July 15, 1982 (age 44); Puerto Cabello, Venezuela
- Batted: Right Threw: Right

Professional debut
- MLB: April 4, 2006, for the Houston Astros
- KBO: May 7, 2011, for the Doosan Bears

Last appearance
- MLB: July 21, 2010, for the New York Mets
- KBO: October 6, 2011, for the Doosan Bears

MLB statistics
- Win–loss record: 8–11
- Earned run average: 4.61
- Strikeouts: 143

KBO statistics
- Win–loss record: 3–6
- Earned run average: 6.09
- Strikeouts: 66
- Stats at Baseball Reference

Teams
- Houston Astros (2006, 2008); New York Mets (2009–2010); Doosan Bears (2011)

Fernando Alexis Nieve [knee-EH-veh] (born July 15, 1982) is a Venezuelan former right-handed professional baseball pitcher. He played in Major League Baseball (MLB) for the Houston Astros and New York Mets, and in the KBO League for the Doosan Bears. He currently serves as a minor league pitching coach for the Washington Nationals.

== Playing career ==
=== Houston Astros ===
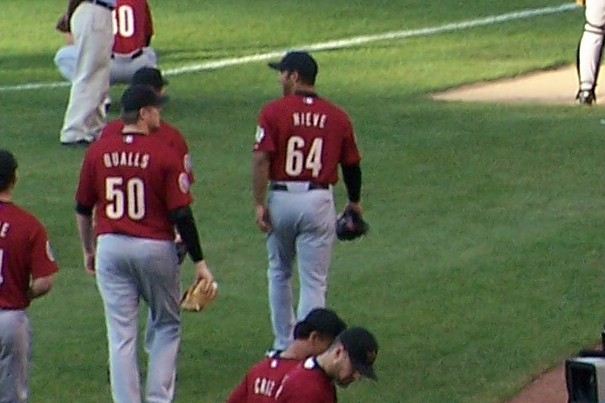
Nieve (64) with the Astros in 2006.

Nieve was signed by the Houston Astros as an amateur free agent in 1999. After two seasons in the Venezuelan Summer League he came to the U.S. to play for the rookie league Martinsville Astros. He was a Texas League all-star in 2005 with the Corpus Christi Hooks, when he was 4–2 with a 2.65 ERA in 14 starts. He made his major league debut with the Houston Astros on April 4, 2006 against the Florida Marlins. He made his first start on April 16 against the Arizona Diamondbacks and picked up his first win on May 2 against the Milwaukee Brewers. He was 3–3 in 40 appearances, 11 starts with the Astros in 2006, with a 4.20 ERA. He missed the 2007 season with after undergoing Tommy John surgery and returned to appear in 11 games in 2008, all in relief and as 0–1 with an 8.44 ERA.

=== New York Mets ===
In March 2009, Nieve was claimed off waivers by the New York Mets and was called to the major league team in June when reliever J. J. Putz was placed on the disabled list. In, 2010, due to his early workload, Mets' TV announcers began referring to him as "Nightly" Nieve. He was designated for assignment on July 23, 2010. After he was let go by the Mets, he rejoined the organization and pitched in the Buffalo Bisons rotation.

=== Pittsburgh Pirates ===
On December 1, 2010, Nieve signed a minor league contract with the Pittsburgh Pirates, which included an invite to spring training. He was released by the Pirates on March 22, 2011.

=== Return to Astros ===
On March 24, 2011, Nieve signed a minor league contract with the Houston Astros. He was released a month later.

=== Doosan Bears ===
After being granted his release by the Astros on April 27, 2011, Nieve signed with the Doosan Bears in South Korea.

=== Los Angeles Dodgers ===
Nieve signed a minor league contract with the Los Angeles Dodgers on December 14, 2011. He was assigned to the Triple-A Albuquerque Isotopes. Nieve made 25 starts for the Isotopes and was 7-9 with a 5.96 ERA.

=== Cleveland Indians ===
Nieve was a non-roster invitee to the Indians' spring training camp in 2013. His contract was purchased by the Indians on April 21, 2013. He was designated for assignment the next day without making an appearance.

=== Oakland Athletics ===
Nieve was traded to the Oakland Athletics for cash considerations on August 3, 2013. He was assigned to the Triple-A Sacramento River Cats. He became a free agent on October 1. Nieve re-signed with Oakland on November 18, 2013.

=== Los Angeles Angels of Anaheim ===
On June 13, 2014, Nieve signed a minor league contract with the Los Angeles Angels of Anaheim.

=== Sugar Land Skeeters ===
Nieve signed with the Sugar Land Skeeters of the Atlantic League of Professional Baseball for the 2015 season.

=== Guerreros de Oaxaca ===
On April 10, 2016, Nieve signed with the Guerreros de Oaxaca of the Mexican League. He was released by the Guerreros on September 23.

=== Rojos del Águila de Veracruz ===
On April 11, 2017, Nieve signed with the Rojos del Águila de Veracruz of the Mexican League. He was released by the Rojos on June 24.

=== Generales de Durango ===
On July 11, 2017, Nieve signed with the Generales de Durango of the Mexican League.

=== T&A San Marino ===
On August 10, 2017, Nieve signed with the T&A San Marino of the Italian Baseball League.

=== Tecolotes de los Dos Laredos ===
On July 2, 2018, Nieve signed with the Tecolotes de los Dos Laredos of the Mexican League. He was released by the Tecolotes on August 13.

== Coaching career ==
=== Pittsburgh Pirates ===
Nieve retired and became the pitching coach of the rookie-level Gulf Coast League Pirates for the 2019 season. He was named pitching coach of the Greensboro Grasshoppers for the 2023 season. Nieve was named pitching coach of the Double-A affiliated Altoona Curve for the 2024 season. He was named as the pitching coach of the Florida Complex League Pirates, the rookie-level affiliate of the Pittsburgh Pirates, for the 2025 season.

=== Washington Nationals ===
On January 29, 2026, Nieve was announced as the pitching coach for the Rochester Red Wings, the Triple-A affiliate of the Washington Nationals.

== See also ==
- List of Major League Baseball players from Venezuela
