= 2008 New York Mets season =

2008 New York Mets
- League: National League
- Division: East
- Ballpark: Shea Stadium
- City: New York
- Record: 89–73 (.549)
- Divisional place: 2nd
- Owners: Fred Wilpon
- General manager: Omar Minaya
- Managers: Willie Randolph; Jerry Manuel
- Television: SportsNet New York; WPIX (CW 11)
- Radio: WFAN; WADO (Spanish)

The 2008 New York Mets season was the franchise's 47th season. The Mets finished the season with an 89–73 record, second place in the National League East, three games behind the Philadelphia Phillies, and one game worse than the wild card winners, the Milwaukee Brewers. The Mets were eliminated from postseason play on their last day of the regular season by the Florida Marlins for the second straight year, which also left New York without a team in the postseason for the first time since 1993, as the crosstown rival Yankees were eliminated from contention just five days prior.

2008 was also the Mets' 45th and final year at Shea Stadium. They moved to Citi Field in 2009.

== Offseason ==
After dropping 12 out of their final 17 games of the 2007 season to lose the National League East to the Philadelphia Phillies on their last day of the regular season, the Mets front office was expected to make big moves in the offseason to give hope for the next season.

Needing to make a decision within five days after the Mets' last game, Tom Glavine declined his $13 million player option. He eventually signed with his former team, the Atlanta Braves, agreeing to a one-year contract worth $8 million on November 18.

On October 31, the Mets took care of two of their own potential free agents. Left fielder Moisés Alou's option year on his contract was picked up for $7.5 million despite Alou only playing in 87 games due to a left quadriceps injury. He did, however, lead the Mets with a .341 batting average and seven outfield assists. Alou also set a franchise record with a 30-game hitting streak after he came off the disabled list. Utility player Damion Easley was re-signed for one year at $950,000. He was on the disabled list two separate times due to a left quadriceps strain on May 11 and a left ankle sprain which ended his season on August 18.

When the free agency period began, the Mets first looked to catcher Yorvit Torrealba to replace 2007 starter Paul Lo Duca. After agreeing to the structure of a three-year contract worth $14.4 million with Torrealba, the Mets suddenly changed their minds on November 17 and retracted the offer, seemingly because of Torrealba's sore shoulder, as the Mets only needed to see the results of his physical to officially complete the deal. Lo Duca never appeared to be the first choice for the Mets, so they continued their search for a starter from another team rather than re-sign Lo Duca, who went on to sign with the Washington Nationals.

After the Torrealba deal fell through, the Mets focused on one of their own free agents. On November 18, second baseman Luis Castillo agreed to a four-year, $25 million contract. The Mets explored the possibility of signing David Eckstein to start at second base, but determined his contract demands were too lofty.

On November 20, the Mets traded relief pitcher Guillermo Mota to the Milwaukee Brewers for catcher Johnny Estrada. This trade ended up just being a salary dump, as Estrada, who was arbitration-eligible, was not offered a new contract, therefore becoming a free agent. The Mets wanted to be rid of Mota and his $3.2 million salary because he pitched to a 5.72 ERA in 2007 after being suspended for 50 games for steroid use.

In response to the Mets' need for a starting catcher, General Manager Omar Minaya made his first significant trade of the offseason on December 1, acquiring catcher Brian Schneider and outfielder Ryan Church from the Nationals for outfielder Lastings Milledge. Once considered the Mets top prospect, Milledge had fallen out of favor with players and management due to his on and off-field antics. Minaya made the trade to acquire two players who, in his mind, would be starters for the Mets.

The Mets made a small move on January 5, 2008, to shore up their outfield depth, acquiring Ángel Pagán from the Chicago Cubs for two minor-league players, outfielder Corey Coles and pitcher Ryan Meyers. Pagán was a fourth-round draft pick by the Mets in 1999, and he was sent to the Cubs on January 25, 2006, for cash.

The Mets' biggest trade of the offseason would come on January 29, when they agreed to a trade for two-time Cy Young Award-winning pitcher Johan Santana from the Minnesota Twins. Minaya agreed to trade outfielder Carlos Gómez and pitchers Philip Humber, Kevin Mulvey, and Deolis Guerra to the Twins. Three days later, to complete the trade, Santana agreed to a six-year contract extension worth $137.5 million, with an option worth an extra $19.5 million for 2014, which can be triggered by performance. This contract was a record amount for an MLB pitcher.

Starting pitcher Óliver Pérez's arbitration case was settled on February 22 and scored a win for Pérez, as the Mets found out they would have to pay him $6.5 million for the 2008 season. This gave Pérez a raise of over $4 million and was $1.775 million more than the Mets offered to pay him.

Another player signed during the offseason was relief pitcher Duaner Sánchez. Sánchez missed all of 2007 due to a broken bone in his left shoulder suffered during a taxi accident in 2006, but the Mets hoped he could still return to be an important part of the bullpen, signing him to a one-year deal for $850,000.

Players who made it to the Mets in 2008 after being signed to minor-league contracts include pitcher Tony Armas Jr., catcher Robinson Cancel, and utility player Fernando Tatís.

== Spring training ==
The Mets entered spring training with questions about their pitching staff due to injury and age. Duaner Sánchez was still recovering from his shoulder injury, and older starters Pedro Martínez and Orlando Hernández were coming off of seasons when they missed significant time due to injury. Martínez made it to Opening Day healthy, but Sánchez and Hernández opened the regular season on the disabled list.

During spring training, the team suffered several injuries to players that they had pegged to play with the Mets when the season opened on March 31. On March 1, Ryan Church collided with Marlon Anderson while trying to catch a fly ball, leaving Church with a concussion and Anderson with a bruised sternum. Ramón Castro aggravated his right hamstring on March 16, ending up with a sprain. It was more severe than first thought, keeping Castro out of play through the beginning of the season. Carlos Beltrán and Luis Castillo were late to start playing because they were both still recovering from offseason knee surgery, while Moisés Alou was held out of action because of hernia surgery. Other players suffered minor injuries that held them out of many exhibition games, but they returned before the first game that counted.

John Maine had the strongest spring training performance from the pitching staff, leading all National League pitchers with a 1.53 ERA. Maine went 3–1 over 29 1/3 innings, with 33 strikeouts and five walks. Ángel Pagán was a surprising force on offense, batting .329 to win the starting left field competition that was open due to Alou's injury.

Coming out of spring training, the Mets set their starting rotation with Johan Santana, Pedro Martínez, John Maine, Óliver Pérez, and Mike Pelfrey in place of Orlando Hernández. The bullpen consisted of Billy Wagner, Aaron Heilman, Pedro Feliciano, Scott Schoeneweis, Matt Wise, and Joe Smith, who beat Brian Stokes for a spot on the roster. Brian Schneider, Carlos Delgado, Luis Castillo, José Reyes, David Wright, Ángel Pagán, Carlos Beltrán, and Ryan Church started in the field.

Marlon Anderson, Damion Easley, and Endy Chávez were set as the bench players, joined by Brady Clark and Raúl Casanova. These decisions caused Rubén Gotay to lose his spot on the roster after playing in 98 games in 2007, so the Mets placed him on waivers, where he was claimed by the Atlanta Braves on March 28.

== Regular season ==
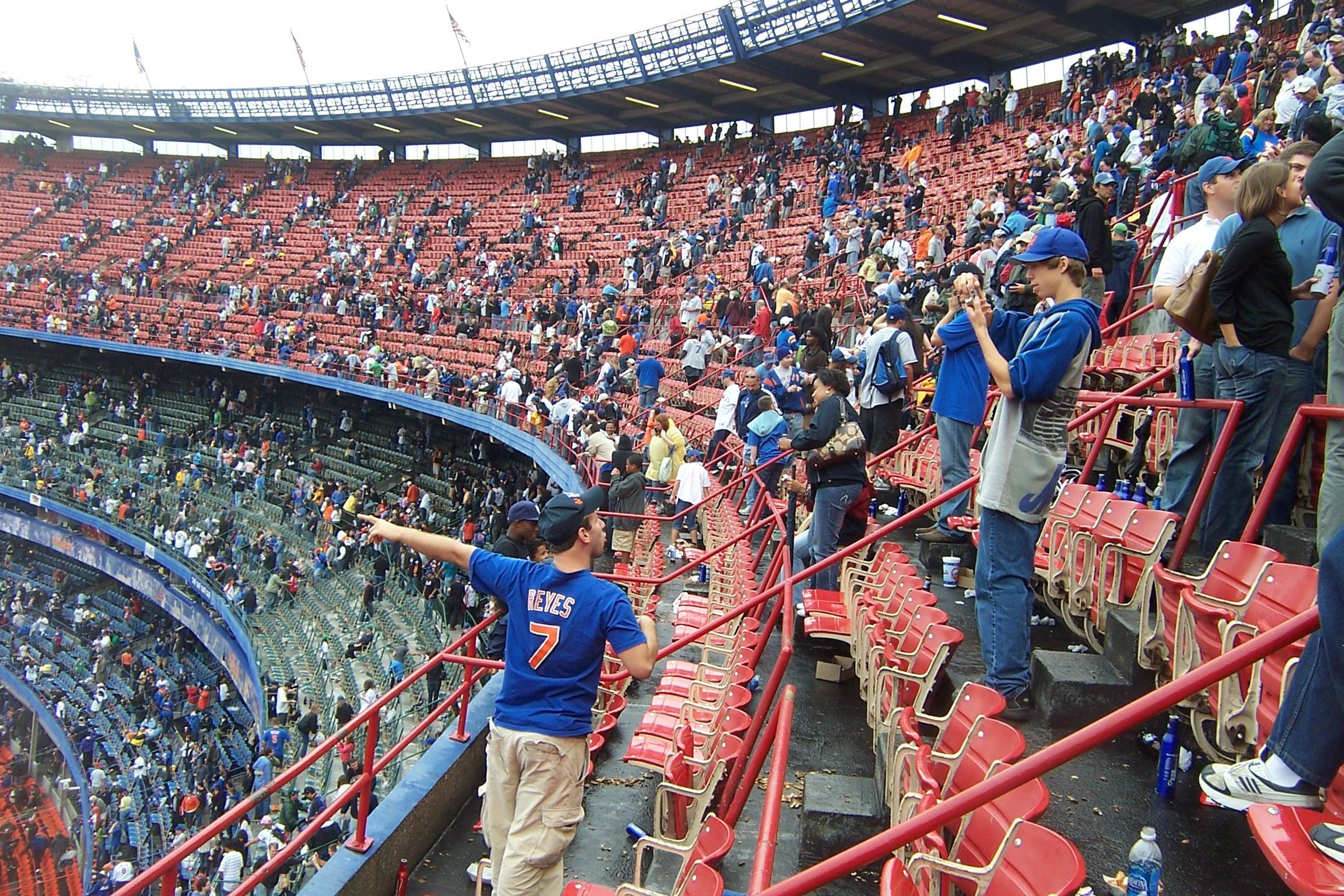
September 27: Fans staying after conclusion of the second-to-last game ever at Shea Stadium (and last Mets win), taking pictures and one last look.

=== Bullpen problems ===
The weakest part of the Mets team was their bullpen, which struggled throughout the season. If all the games played by the Mets ended after the 8th inning the team would have won the NL East by 12 games.

=== Roster changes ===
- On June 13, 2008, the Mets acquired Trot Nixon via trade from the Arizona Diamondbacks. The move was deemed necessary due to multiple injuries in the Mets outfield.
- The Mets fired manager Willie Randolph as well as pitching coach Rick Peterson and first base coach Tom Nieto just two hours after the team's 9–6 victory over the Los Angeles Angels of Anaheim on June 16, 2008. They were replaced by interim manager Jerry Manuel and coaches Ken Oberkfell, Dan Warthen, and Luis Aguayo.

=== Season standings ===
NL East
Team	W	L	Pct.	GB	Home	Road
Philadelphia Phillies	92	70	.568	—	48‍–‍33	44‍–‍37
New York Mets	89	73	.549	3	48‍–‍33	41‍–‍40
Florida Marlins	84	77	.522	7½	45‍–‍36	39‍–‍41
Atlanta Braves	72	90	.444	20	43‍–‍38	29‍–‍52
Washington Nationals	59	102	.366	32½	34‍–‍46	25‍–‍56

=== Record vs. opponents ===
2008 National League record Source: MLB Standings Grid – 2008
Team	AZ	ATL	CHC	CIN	COL	FLA	HOU	LAD	MIL	NYM	PHI	PIT	SD	SF	STL	WAS	AL
Arizona	–	3–5	2–4	2–4	15–3	2–7	4–2	8–10	2–5	3–3	3–4	4–3	10–8	11–7	3–4	4–2	6–9
Atlanta	5–3	–	0–6	3–3	4–3	10–8	3–3	4–2	3–6	11–7	4–14	2–5	5–1	2–5	2–5	6–12	8–7
Chicago	4–2	6–0	–	8–7	5–1	4–3	8–9	5–2	9–7	4–2	3–4	14–4	5–2	4–3	9–6	3–3	6–9
Cincinnati	4–2	3–3	7–8	–	1–5	6–2	3–12	1–7	10–8	3–4	3–5	6–9	4–3	5–1	5–10	4–3	9–6
Colorado	3–15	3–4	1–5	5–1	–	5–3	3–3	8–10	4–3	3–6	0–5	5–2	9–9	11–7	3–4	4–3	7–8
Florida	7–2	8–10	3–4	2–6	3–5	–	4–2	3–4	5–1	8–10	10–8	3–2	4–2	3–3	2–5	14–3	5–10
Houston	2–4	3–3	9–8	12–3	3–3	2–4	–	4–3	7–8	5–2	3–4	8–8	3–3	7–1	7–8	4–2	7–11
Los Angeles	10–8	2–4	2–5	7–1	10–8	4–3	3–4	–	4–2	3–4	4–4	5–2	11–7	9–9	2–4	3–3	5–10
Milwaukee	5–2	6–3	7–9	8–10	3–4	1–5	8–7	2–4	–	2–4	1–5	14–1	4–3	6–0	10–5	6–2	7–8
New York	3–3	7–11	2–4	4–3	6–3	10–8	2–5	4–3	4–2	–	11–7	4–3	2–5	5–1	4–3	12–6	9–6
Philadelphia	4–3	14–4	4–3	5–3	5–0	8–10	4–3	4–4	5–1	7–11	–	4–2	4–2	3–3	5–4	12–6	4–11
Pittsburgh	3–4	5–2	4–14	9–6	2–5	2–3	8–8	2–5	1–14	3–4	2–4	–	3–4	4–2	10–7	3–4	6–9
San Diego	8–10	1–5	2–5	3–4	9–9	2–4	3–3	7–11	3–4	5–2	2–4	4–3	–	5–13	1–6	5–1	3–15
San Francisco	7–11	5–2	3–4	1–5	7–11	3–3	1–7	9–9	0–6	1–5	3–3	2–4	13–5	–	4–3	7–0	6–12
St. Louis	4–3	5–2	6–9	10–5	4–3	5–2	8–7	4–2	5–10	3–4	4–5	7–10	6–1	3–4	–	5–1	7–8
Washington	2–4	12–6	3–3	3–4	3–4	3–14	2–4	3–3	2–6	6–12	6–12	4–3	1–5	0–7	1–5	–	8–10

=== Roster ===
2008 New York Mets
Roster
Pitchers: 44 Tony Armas Jr.; 56 Luis Ayala; 25 Pedro Feliciano; 27 Nelson Figueroa; 48 Aaron Heilman; 28,44 Brandon Knight; 44 Eddie Kunz; 33 John Maine; 45 Pedro Martínez; 32 Carlos Muñiz; 49 Jonathan Niese; 39 Bobby Parnell; 34 Mike Pelfrey; 46 Óliver Pérez; 73 Ricardo Rincón; 50 Duaner Sánchez; 57 Johan Santana; 60 Scott Schoeneweis; 35 Joe Smith; 29 Jorge Sosa; 43 Brian Stokes; 39 Claudio Vargas; 13 Billy Wagner; 38 Matt Wise	Catchers: 4,40 Robinson Cancel; 30 Raul Casanova; 11 Ramón Castro; 6,29 Gustavo Molina; 23 Brian Schneider; Infielders: 1 Luis Castillo; 21 Carlos Delgado; 3 Damion Easley; 22 Ramón Martínez; 4 Argenis Reyes; 7 José Reyes; 5 David Wright	Outfielders: 29 Chris Aguila; 18 Moisés Alou; 9 Marlon Anderson; 15 Carlos Beltrán; 10 Endy Chávez; 19 Ryan Church; 44 Brady Clark; 6 Nick Evans; 28 Daniel Murphy; 6 Trot Nixon; 16 Ángel Pagán; 29 Andy Phillips; 17 Fernando Tatís; Other batters: 6 Abraham Núñez	Manager: 53 Jerry Manuel; 12 Willie Randolph; Coaches: 51 Luis Aguayo (third base); 90 Sandy Alomar Jr. (catching); 2 Sandy Alomar Sr. (third base/bench); 52 Guy Conti (bullpen); 20 Howard Johnson (hitting); 53 Jerry Manuel (bench); 55 Tom Nieto (first base); 55 Ken Oberkfell (first base); 51 Rick Peterson (pitching); 59 Dan Warthen (pitching)

=== Game log ===
Legend
Mets Win	Mets Loss	Game postponed	Eliminated from playoff spot

2008 Game Log
March: 1–0

#	Date	Opponent	Score	Win	Loss	Save	Attendance	Record
1	March 31	@ Marlins	7–2	Santana (1–0)	Hendrickson (0–1)		38,308	1–0

April: 13–12

#	Date	Opponent	Score	Win	Loss	Save	Attendance	Record
2	April 1	@ Marlins	5–4 (10)	J. Miller (1–0)	Wise (0–1)		15,117	1–1
3	April 2	@ Marlins	13–0	Pérez (1–0)	A. Miller (0–1)		13,720	2–1
—	April 4	@ Braves	Postponed (rain) Rescheduled for May 20					
4	April 5	@ Braves	11–5	Hudson (1–0)	Maine (0–1)		36,130	2–2
5	April 6	@ Braves	3–1	Smoltz (1–0)	Santana (1–1)	Soriano (1)	39,414	2–3
6	April 8	Phillies	5–2	Moyer (1–0)	Schoeneweis (0–1)	Gordon (1)	56,350	2–4
7	April 9	Phillies	8–2	Pelfrey (1–0)	Kendrick (1–1)		47,127	3–4
8	April 10	Phillies	4–3 (12)	Sosa (1–0)	Gordon (0–2)		49,049	4–4
9	April 11	Brewers	4–2	Figueroa (1–0)	Parra (1–1)	Wagner (1)	46,214	5–4
10	April 12	Brewers	5–3	Sheets (2–0)	Santana (1–2)	Gagné (2)	54,701	5–5
11	April 13	Brewers	9–7	Torres (2–0)	Sosa (1–1)	Gagné (3)	52,794	5–6
12	April 15	Nationals	6–0	Pelfrey (2–0)	Pérez (0–3)		46,567	6–6
13	April 16	Nationals	5–2	Maine (1–1)	Chico (0–3)	Wagner (2)	46,106	7–6
14	April 17	Nationals	3–2 (14)	Sosa (2–1)	Hanrahan (0–1)		47,785	8–6
15	April 18	@ Phillies	6–4	Santana (2–2)	Hamels (2–2)	Wagner (3)	45,156	9–6
16	April 19	@ Phillies	4–2	Pérez (2–0)	Moyer (1–1)	Wagner (4)	45,149	10–6
17	April 20	@ Phillies	5–4	Romero (1–0)	Feliciano (0–1)	Lidge (3)	45,173	10–7
18	April 21	@ Cubs	7–1	Zambrano (3–1)	Maine (1–2)		40,582	10–8
19	April 22	@ Cubs	8–1	Lilly (1–3)	Figueroa (1–1)		40,503	10–9
20	April 23	@ Nationals	7–2	Santana (3–2)	Redding (3–2)		32,780	11–9
21	April 24	@ Nationals	10–5	O'Connor (1–0)	Pérez (2–1)		29,750	11–10
22	April 25	Braves	6–3	Jurrjens (3–2)	Pelfrey (2–1)		52,495	11–11
23	April 26	Braves	4–3	Maine (2–2)	Hudson (3–2)	Wagner (5)	51,339	12–11
24	April 27	Braves	6–3	Figueroa (2–1)	Smoltz (3–2)	Wagner (6)	53,487	13–11
—	April 28	Pirates	Postponed (rain) Rescheduled for August 11					
25	April 29	Pirates	5–4 (11)	Sosa (3–1)	Van Benschoten (0–1)		46,982	14–11
26	April 30	Pirates	13–1	Gorzelanny (2–3)	Pérez (2–2)		46,788	14–12

May: 13–15

#	Date	Opponent	Score	Win	Loss	Save	Attendance	Record
27	May 2	@ Diamondbacks	7–2	Maine (3–2)	Owings (4–1)		35,682	15–12
28	May 3	@ Diamondbacks	10–4	Webb (7–0)	Pelfrey (2–2)		34,744	15–13
29	May 4	@ Diamondbacks	5–2	Sosa (4–1)	Qualls (0–2)	Wagner (7)	37,593	16–13
30	May 5	@ Dodgers	5–1	Billingsley (2–4)	Pérez (3–2)		44,181	16–14
31	May 6	@ Dodgers	5–4	Kuo (2–1)	Figueroa (2–2)	Saito (5)	43,927	16–15
32	May 7	@ Dodgers	12–1	Maine (4–2)	Penny (5–3)		40,696	17–15
—	May 9	Reds	Postponed (rain) Rescheduled for May 10					
33	May 10	Reds	12–6	Santana (4–2)	Belisle (1–3)		55,186	18–15
34	May 10	Reds	7–1	Arroyo (2–4)	Pelfrey (2–3)		47,673	18–16
35	May 11	Reds	8–3	Pérez (3–3)	Cueto (2–4)		49,264	19–16
36	May 12	Nationals	10–4	Pérez (1–3)	Figueroa (2–3)		45,321	19–17
37	May 13	Nationals	6–3	Maine (5–2)	Lannan (3–4)	Wagner (8)	46,618	20–17
38	May 14	Nationals	5–3	Redding (5–3)	Vargas (0–1)	Rauch (8)	48,529	20–18
39	May 15	Nationals	1–0	Bergmann (1–1)	Pelfrey (2–4)	Rauch (9)	51,769	20–19
—	May 16	@ Yankees	Postponed (rain) Rescheduled for June 27					
40	May 17	@ Yankees	7–4	Santana (5–2)	Pettitte (3–5)	Wagner (9)	55,093	21–19
41	May 18	@ Yankees	11–2	Pérez (4–3)	Wang (6–2)		55,012	22–19
42	May 20	@ Braves	6–1	Glavine (2–1)	Maine (5–3)		26,873	22–20
43	May 20	@ Braves	6–2	Campillo (1–0)	Vargas (0–2)	Acosta (3)	25,590	22–21
44	May 21	@ Braves	11–4	Jurrjens (5–3)	Pelfrey (2–5)		30,335	22–22
45	May 22	@ Braves	4–2	Hudson (7–3)	Santana (5–3)	Ohman (1)	30,348	22–23
46	May 23	@ Rockies	6–5 (13)	Buchholz (2–2)	Heilman (0–1)		33,341	22–24
47	May 24	@ Rockies	9–2	Vargas (1–2)	Francis (1–5)		38,142	23–24
48	May 25	@ Rockies	4–1	Cook (7–3)	Maine (5–4)		42,123	23–25
49	May 26	Marlins	7–3	Nolasco (4–3)	Pelfrey (2–6)		51,489	23–26
50	May 27	Marlins	5–3	Santana (6–3)	A. Miller (4–4)	Wagner (10)	47,093	24–26
51	May 28	Marlins	7–6 (12)	Sánchez (1–0)	J. Miller (1–2)		47,769	25–26
52	May 29	Dodgers	8–4	Vargas (2–2)	Penny (5–6)		52,886	26–26
53	May 30	Dodgers	9–5	Park (2–1)	Heilman (0–2)		52,176	26–27
54	May 31	Dodgers	3–2	Sánchez (2–0)	Broxton (2–2)	Wagner (11)	53,528	27–27

June: 13–15

#	Date	Opponent	Score	Win	Loss	Save	Attendance	Record
55	June 1	Dodgers	6–1	Santana (7–3)	Kuroda (2–5)		50,263	28–27
56	June 2	@ Giants	10–2	Sánchez (4–3)	Pérez (4–4)		36,126	28–28
57	June 3	@ Giants	9–6	P. Martínez (1–0)	Zito (1–9)	Wagner (12)	35,228	29–28
58	June 4	@ Giants	5–3	Maine (6–4)	Cain (2–4)	Wagner (13)	35,646	30–28
59	June 5	@ Padres	2–1	Hoffman (1–4)	Schoeneweis (0–2)		28,867	30–29
60	June 6	@ Padres	2–1	Wolf (4–4)	Santana (7–4)	Hoffman (13)	27,749	30–30
61	June 7	@ Padres	2–1 (10)	Adams (1–0)	Feliciano (0–2)		38,972	30–31
62	June 8	@ Padres	8–6	Guevara (1–0)	Wagner (0–1)	Hoffman (14)	31,992	30–32
63	June 10	Diamondbacks	9–5	Qualls (1–5)	Smith (0–1)		45,808	30–33
64	June 11	Diamondbacks	5–3 (13)	Vargas (3–2)	González (1–3)		46,503	31–33
65	June 12	Diamondbacks	5–4 (10)	Lyon (2–1)	Heilman (0–3)		47,042	31–34
66	June 13	Rangers	7–1	Pérez (5–4)	Feldman (1–3)		49,880	32–34
—	June 14	Rangers	Postponed (rain) Rescheduled for June 15					
67	June 15	Rangers	8–7	Millwood (5–3)	Maine (6–5)	Wilson (13)	55,438	32–35
68	June 15	Rangers	4–2	P. Martínez (2–0)	Gabbard (1–3)	Wagner (14)	55,438	33–35
69	June 16	@ Angels	9–6	Pelfrey (3–6)	Weaver (6–7)	Wagner (15)	39,229	34–35
70	June 17	@ Angels	6–1	Lackey (4–1)	Santana (7–5)	Shields (2)	40,122	34–36
71	June 18	@ Angels	5–4 (10)	Sánchez (3–0)	Speier (0–4)	Wagner (16)	43,138	35–36
72	June 20	@ Rockies	7–2	Maine (7–5)	Cook (10–4)		30,411	36–36
73	June 21	@ Rockies	7–1	Jiménez (2–7)	P. Martínez (2–1)		35,637	36–37
74	June 22	@ Rockies	3–1	Pelfrey (4–6)	Reynolds (2–5)	Wagner (17)	45,019	37–37
75	June 23	Mariners	5–2	Rowland-Smith (2–1)	Santana (7–6)	Rhodes (1)	49,789	37–38
76	June 24	Mariners	11–0	Dickey (2–3)	Pérez (5–5)		49,386	37–39
77	June 25	Mariners	8–2	Maine (8–5)	Batista (3–10)		52,154	38–39
78	June 27	@ Yankees	15–6	Pelfrey (5–6)	Giese (1–3)		54,978	39–39
79	June 27	Yankees	9–0	Ponson (5–1)	P. Martínez (2–2)		56,308	39–40
80	June 28	Yankees	3–2	Pettitte (9–5)	Santana (7–7)	Rivera (22)	56,172	39–41
81	June 29	Yankees	3–1	Pérez (6–5)	Rasner (4–6)	Wagner (18)	56,277	40–41
82	June 30	@ Cardinals	7–1	Lohse (10–2)	Maine (8–6)		42,206	40–42

July: 18–8

#	Date	Opponent	Score	Win	Loss	Save	Attendance	Record
83	July 1	@ Cardinals	7–4	Armas (1–0)	Wellemeyer (7–3)	Wagner (19)	42,425	41–42
84	July 2	@ Cardinals	8–7	Franklin (3–2)	Muñiz (0–1)		40,995	41–43
85	July 3	@ Cardinals	11–1	Pelfrey (6–6)	Boggs (3–1)		43,099	42–43
86	July 4	@ Phillies	3–2	Lidge (2–0)	Sánchez (3–1)		44,922	42–44
87	July 5	@ Phillies	9–4	Feliciano (1–2)	Romero (4–2)		45,190	43–44
88	July 6	@ Phillies	4–2 (12)	Smith (1–1)	Durbin (2–2)		45,203	44–44
89	July 7	@ Phillies	10–9	P. Martínez (3–2)	Eaton (3–7)	Wagner (20)	44,655	45–44
90	July 8	Giants	7–0	Pelfrey (7–6)	Lincecum (10–2)		48,887	46–44
91	July 9	Giants	5–0	Santana (8–7)	Sánchez (8–5)		48,896	47–44
92	July 10	Giants	7–3	Schoeneweis (1–2)	Romo (0–1)		48,755	48–44
93	July 11	Rockies	2–1	Feliciano (2–2)	Buchholz (3–3)	Wagner (21)	49,016	49–44
94	July 12	Rockies	3–0	Muñiz (1–1)	Jiménez (4–9)	Wagner (22)	54,137	50–44
95	July 13	Rockies	7–0	Pelfrey (8–6)	Redman (2–5)		51,293	51–44
96	July 17	@ Reds	10–8	Sánchez (4–1)	Cordero (4–2)	Wagner (23)	23,681	52–44
97	July 18	@ Reds	5–2	Arroyo (8–7)	Maine (8–7)	Cordero (20)	31,922	52–45
98	July 19	@ Reds	7–2	Fogg (2–2)	Pérez (6–6)		41,959	52–46
99	July 20	@ Reds	7–5 (10)	Sánchez (5–1)	Bray (2–1)	Wagner (24)	31,195	53–46
100	July 22	Phillies	8–6	Durbin (3–2)	Smith (1–2)	Lidge (22)	55,081	53–47
101	July 23	Phillies	6–3	Maine (9–7)	Madson (2–1)	Wagner (25)	53,444	54–47
102	July 24	Phillies	3–1	Heilman (1–3)	Romero (4–3)	Wagner (26)	50,962	55–47
103	July 25	Cardinals	7–2	Pelfrey (9–6)	Boggs (3–2)		55,372	56–47
104	July 26	Cardinals	10–8 (14)	Thompson (3–2)	Heilman (1–4)		53,799	56–48
105	July 27	Cardinals	9–1	Santana (9–7)	Lohse (12–3)		53,691	57–48
106	July 28	@ Marlins	7–3	Waechter (3–2)	Smith (1–3)		23,165	57–49
107	July 29	@ Marlins	4–1	Pérez (7–6)	Olsen (6–6)	Wagner (27)	25,032	58–49
108	July 30	@ Marlins	7–5	Johnson (1–0)	Pelfrey (9–7)	Gregg (23)	25,902	58–50

August: 18–11

#	Date	Opponent	Score	Win	Loss	Save	Attendance	Record
109	August 1	@ Astros	7–3	Brocail (5–5)	Heilman (1–5)		41,083	58–51
110	August 2	@ Astros	5–4	Valverde (5–3)	Heilman (1–6)		39,152	58–52
111	August 3	@ Astros	4–0	Wolf (7–10)	Pérez (7–7)		38,602	58–53
112	August 5	Padres	6–5	Pelfrey (10–7)	Adams (1–1)	Schoeneweis (1)	52,130	59–53
113	August 6	Padres	4–2	Baek (4–6)	P. Martínez (3–3)	Hoffman (24)	48,018	59–54
114	August 7	Padres	5–3	Heilman (2–6)	Bell (6–5)		49,352	60–54
115	August 8	Marlins	3–0	Pérez (8–7)	Nolasco (11–7)	Heilman (1)	50,307	61–54
116	August 9	Marlins	8–6	Schoeneweis (2–2)	Olsen (6–7)	Heilman (2)	52,484	62–54
117	August 10	Marlins	8–2	Johnson (3–0)	Pelfrey (10–8)		54,242	62–55
118	August 11	Pirates	7–5	D. Bautista (4–2)	Heilman (2–7)	Grabow (2)	53,534	62–56
119	August 12	@ Nationals	4–3	Santana (10–7)	Rivera (3–5)	Feliciano (1)	32,186	63–56
120	August 13	@ Nationals	12–0	Maine (10–7)	Bergmann (2–9)	Stokes (1)	30,814	64–56
121	August 14	@ Nationals	9–3	Pérez (9–7)	Balester (2–5)		31,058	65–56
122	August 15	@ Pirates	2–1	Pelfrey (11–8)	Davis (1–2)	Heilman (3)	36,418	66–56
123	August 16	@ Pirates	7–4	P. Martínez (4–3)	Duke (4–11)	Feliciano (2)	37,506	67–56
124	August 17	@ Pirates	4–0	Santana (11–7)	Karstens (2–2)		36,483	68–56
125	August 18	@ Pirates	5–2	Burnett (1–1)	Feliciano (2–3)	Grabow (4)	19,066	68–57
126	August 19	Braves	7–3	Heilman (3–7)	Bennett (2–5)		50,589	69–57
127	August 20	Braves	6–3	Pelfrey (12–8)	Jurrjens (11–9)		50,178	70–57
128	August 21	Braves	5–4	Ayala (2–8)	Núñez (0–1)		51,952	71–57
129	August 22	Astros	3–0	Santana (12–7)	Oswalt (11–9)	Ayala (1)	52,008	72–57
130	August 23	Astros	8–3	Backe (8–12)	Maine (10–8)		51,766	72–58
131	August 24	Astros	6–4 (10)	Hawkins (3–1)	Feliciano (2–4)	Valverde (33)	49,758	72–59
132	August 25	Astros	9–1	Pelfrey (13–8)	Moehler (9–5)		49,791	73–59
133	August 26	@ Phillies	8–7 (13)	Seánez (5–3)	Schoeneweis (2–3)		45,204	73–60
134	August 27	@ Phillies	6–3	Stokes (1–0)	Seánez (5–4)	Ayala (2)	45,138	74–60
135	August 29	@ Marlins	5–4	Smith (2–3)	Gregg (6–8)	Ayala (3)	20,043	75–60
136	August 30	@ Marlins	4–3	Lindstrom (2–2)	Heilman (3–8)		28,830	75–61
137	August 31	@ Marlins	6–2	P. Martínez (5–3)	Olsen (6–9)		16,123	76–61

September: 13–12

#	Date	Opponent	Score	Win	Loss	Save	Attendance	Record
138	September 1	@ Brewers	4–2	Figueroa (3–3)	Gagné (4–3)	Ayala (4)	41,476	77–61
139	September 2	@ Brewers	6–5 (10)	Smith (3–3)	Torres (6–4)	Ayala (5)	36,587	78–61
140	September 3	@ Brewers	9–2	Pérez (10–7)	Bush (9–10)		26,236	79–61
141	September 5	Phillies	3–0	Myers (9–10)	Pelfrey (13–9)	Lidge (34)	48,302	79–62
—	September 6	Phillies	Postponed (rain) Rescheduled for September 7					
142	September 7	Phillies	6–2	Moyer (13–7)	P. Martínez (5–4)		55,797	79–63
143	September 7	Phillies	6–3	Santana (13–7)	Hamels (12–9)		54,980	80–63
144	September 9	Nationals	10–8	Smith (4–3)	Manning (1–3)	Ayala (6)	50,382	81–63
145	September 10	Nationals	13–10	Smith (5–3)	Rivera (5–6)	Ayala (7)	52,431	82–63
—	September 12	Braves	Postponed (rain) Rescheduled for September 13					
146	September 13	Braves	3–2	Ridgway (1–0)	Schoeneweis (2–4)	González (10)	54,705	82–64
147	September 13	Braves	5–0	Niese (1–0)	Reyes (3–11)		54,705	83–64
148	September 14	Braves	7–4	Julio (2–0)	Ayala (2–9)	González (11)	56,041	83–65
149	September 15	@ Nationals	7–2	Lannan (9–13)	P. Martínez (5–5)		21,759	83–66
150	September 16	@ Nationals	1–0	Pérez (7–10)	Pelfrey (13–10)	Hanrahan (9)	24,997	83–67
151	September 17	@ Nationals	9–7	Knight (1–0)	Martis (0–3)	Ayala (8)	25,019	84–67
152	September 18	@ Nationals	7–2	Santana (14–7)	Redding (10–10)		25,426	85–67
153	September 19	@ Braves	9–5	Feliciano (3–4)	Tavárez (1–4)		42,803	86–67
154	September 20	@ Braves	4–2	Campillo (8–7)	P. Martínez (5–6)	González (12)	50,124	86–68
155	September 21	@ Braves	7–6	Julio (3–0)	Schoeneweis (2–5)	González (13)	49,222	86–69
156	September 22	Cubs	9–5	Marquis (11–9)	Niese (1–1)	Wood (33)	51,137	86–70
157	September 23	Cubs	6–2	Santana (15–7)	Gaudin (4–2)	Ayala (9)	50,615	87–70
158	September 24	Cubs	9–6	Howry (7–4)	Ayala (2–10)	Wood (34)	54,416	87–71
159	September 25	Cubs	7–6	Smith (6–3)	Hart (2–2)		51,174	88–71
160	September 26	Marlins	6–1	Volstad (6–4)	Pelfrey (13–11)		49,545	88–72
161	September 27	Marlins	2–0	Santana (16–7)	Nolasco (15–8)		54,920	89–72
162	September 28	Marlins	4–2	Nelson (3–1)	Schoeneweis (2–6)	Lindstrom (5)	56,059	89–73

== Player stats ==
=== Batting ===
Legend: G = Games played; AB = At-bats; H = Hits; BA = Batting average; OBP = On-base percentage; HR = Home runs; RBI = Runs batted in; R = Runs scored; SB = Stolen bases; bold = league leader

Player	G	AB	H	BA	OBP	HR	RBI	R	SB
Chris Aguila	8	12	2	.167	.286	0	0	0	0
Moisés Alou	15	49	17	.347	.389	0	9	4	1
Marlon Anderson	87	138	29	.210	.255	1	10	16	2
Tony Armas Jr.	3	3	0	.000	.000	0	0	0	0
Carlos Beltrán	161	606	172	.284	.376	27	112	116	25
Robinson Cancel	27	49	12	.245	.288	1	5	5	1
Raul Casanova	20	55	15	.273	.344	1	6	5	0
Luis Castillo	87	298	73	.245	.355	3	28	46	17
Ramón Castro	52	143	35	.245	.312	7	24	15	0
Endy Chávez	133	270	72	.267	.308	1	12	30	6
Ryan Church	90	319	88	.276	.346	12	49	54	2
Brady Clark	7	8	2	.250	.400	0	1	0	1
Carlos Delgado	159	598	162	.271	.353	38	115	96	1
Damion Easley	113	316	85	.269	.322	6	44	33	0
Nick Evans	50	109	28	.257	.303	2	9	18	0
Nelson Figueroa	16	12	1	.083	.214	0	0	0	0
Aaron Heilman	75	1	0	.000	.000	0	0	0	0
Brandon Knight	4	3	0	.000	.000	0	0	0	0
John Maine	26	46	5	.109	.212	0	3	3	0
Pedro Martínez	20	39	6	.154	.154	0	4	3	0
Ramón Martínez	7	16	4	.250	.333	0	0	3	0
Gustavo Molina	2	7	1	.143	.250	0	0	0	0
Daniel Murphy	49	131	41	.313	.397	2	17	24	0
Jon Niese	3	6	1	.167	.167	0	0	0	0
Trot Nixon	11	35	6	.171	.293	1	1	2	1
Abraham Núñez	2	2	0	.000	.000	0	0	0	0
Ángel Pagán	31	91	25	.275	.346	0	13	12	4
Mike Pelfrey	30	59	5	.085	.156	0	2	4	0
Óliver Pérez	32	56	6	.107	.167	0	3	2	1
Andy Phillips	4	5	1	.200	.200	0	0	1	0
Argenis Reyes	49	110	24	.218	.259	1	3	13	2
José Reyes	159	688	**204**	.297	.358	16	68	113	56
Johan Santana	32	78	11	.141	.173	0	1	5	0
Brian Schneider	110	335	86	.257	.339	9	38	30	0
Scott Schoeneweis	71	1	0	.000	.000	0	0	0	0
Joe Smith	82	1	0	.000	.000	0	0	0	0
Jorge Sosa	20	1	0	.000	.500	0	0	0	0
Brian Stokes	24	3	2	.667	.667	0	0	0	0
Fernando Tatís	92	273	81	.297	.369	11	47	33	3
Claudio Vargas	10	8	0	.000	.000	0	0	1	0
David Wright	160	626	189	.302	.390	33	124	115	15
**Team totals**	**162**	**5606**	**1491**	**.266**	**.340**	**172**	**751**	**799**	**138**

=== Pitching ===
Legend: G = Games pitched; GS = Games started; IP = Innings pitched; W = Wins; L = Losses; SV = Saves; ERA = Earned run average; H = Hits allowed; SO = Strikeouts; BB = Walks; S = Saves; bold = league leader

Player	G	GS	IP	W	L	SV	ERA	H	SO	BB
Luis Ayala	19	0	18	1	2	9	5.50	23	14	2
Tony Armas Jr.	3	1	8 1/3	1	0	0	7.56	11	6	1
Pedro Feliciano	**86**	0	53 1/3	3	4	2	4.05	57	50	26
Nelson Figueroa	16	6	45 1/3	3	3	0	4.57	48	36	26
Aaron Heilman	78	0	76	3	8	3	5.21	75	80	46
Brandon Knight	4	2	12	1	0	0	5.25	14	10	7
Eddie Kunz	4	0	2 2/3	0	0	0	13.50	5	1	1
John Maine	25	25	140	10	8	0	4.18	122	122	67
Pedro Martínez	20	20	109	5	6	0	5.61	127	87	44
Carlos Muñiz	18	0	23 1/3	1	1	0	5.40	24	16	7
Jon Niese	3	3	14	1	1	0	7.07	20	11	8
Bobby Parnell	6	0	5	0	0	0	5.40	3	3	2
Mike Pelfrey	32	32	200 2/3	13	11	0	3.72	209	110	64
Óliver Pérez	34	34	194	10	7	0	4.22	167	180	105
Ricardo Rincón	8	0	4	0	0	0	4.50	4	3	1
Duaner Sánchez	66	0	58 1/3	5	1	0	4.32	54	44	23
Johan Santana	34	**34**	234 1/3	16	7	0	**2.53**	206	206	53
Scott Schoeneweis	73	0	56 2/3	2	6	1	3.34	55	34	23
Joe Smith	82	0	63 1/3	6	3	0	3.55	51	52	31
Jorge Sosa	20	0	21 2/3	4	1	0	7.06	30	12	11
Brian Stokes	24	1	33 1/3	1	0	1	3.51	35	26	8
Claudio Vargas	11	4	37	3	2	0	4.62	33	20	11
Billy Wagner	45	0	47	0	1	27	2.30	32	52	10
Matt Wise	8	0	7	0	1	0	6.43	10	6	3
**Team totals**	**162**	**162**	**1464.1**	**89**	**73**	**43**	**4.07**	**1415**	**1181**	**590**

== Farm system ==
Level	Team	League	Manager
AAA	New Orleans Zephyrs	Pacific Coast League	Ken Oberkfell and Marty Scott
AA	Binghamton Mets	Eastern League	Mako Oliveras
A	St. Lucie Mets	Florida State League	Tim Teufel
A	Savannah Sand Gnats	South Atlantic League	Donovan Mitchell
A-Short Season	Brooklyn Cyclones	New York–Penn League	Edgar Alfonzo
Rookie	Kingsport Mets	Appalachian League	Nick Leyva and Pedro López
Rookie	GCL Mets	Gulf Coast League	Juan López

Preceded by 2007	New York Mets seasons 2008	Succeeded by 2009
