= Ike Davis =

American baseball player (born 1987)

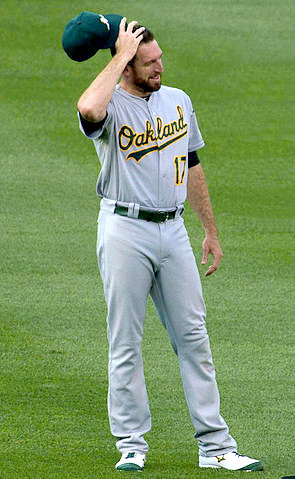
- Davis with the Oakland Athletics in 2015
- First baseman
- Born: March 22, 1987 (age 39); Edina, Minnesota, U.S.
- Batted: Left Threw: Left

MLB debut
- April 19, 2010, for the New York Mets

Last MLB appearance
- June 24, 2016, for the New York Yankees

MLB statistics
- Batting average: .239
- Home runs: 81
- Runs batted in: 291
- Stats at Baseball Reference

Teams
- New York Mets (2010–2014); Pittsburgh Pirates (2014); Oakland Athletics (2015); New York Yankees (2016)
Medals
Men's baseball
Representing United States
Baseball World Cup
Gold medal – first place	2009 Nettuno	Team
World Youth Baseball Championship
Gold medal – first place	2003 Kaohsiung	Team

Isaac Benjamin Davis (born March 22, 1987) is an American former professional baseball first baseman. From 2010 through 2016, he played in Major League Baseball (MLB) for the New York Mets, Pittsburgh Pirates, Oakland Athletics, and New York Yankees.

Davis led his high school team to three straight Arizona state championships as a pitcher and first baseman. As a hitter he batted .447, while as a pitcher he recorded a 23–0 win–loss record, a 1.85 earned run average (ERA), and 14 saves. He also pitched for the gold medal-winning U.S.A. Youth National Team in the 2003 World Youth Championships, and was the most valuable player of the 2004 AFLAC All-American High School Baseball Classic.

Ranked second in the nation as a freshman for Arizona State University by both Baseball America and Collegiate Baseball, he was named Pac-10 Conference Freshman of the Year, as he became the first freshman ever to lead the conference in runs batted in (RBIs). He hit .353 with a .605 slugging percentage in college, threw a fastball that reached 94 miles per hour, and was a two-time All-American and a three-time All-Pac-10 selection.

Davis was drafted 18th overall in the first round of the 2008 MLB draft. In the minor leagues, he batted .288 with a .371 on-base percentage (OBP), and a .467 slugging percentage, and was the Mets 2009 Organizational Player of the Year.

The Mets called him up to the majors in April 2010. His 11 home runs prior to the All-Star break that season tied him for the second-most ever by a Mets rookie. He set the Mets rookie record for total bases (230), and tied the Mets rookie records for bases on balls (72) and extra-base hits (53). He was named the first baseman on Baseball America's 2010 All-Rookie Team. During a 2011 season shortened by an ankle injury, Davis batted .302. In 2012, he batted .227, but his 32 home runs were 5th-best in the National League. In 2013, he split his time between the Mets and AAA Las Vegas. He was traded to the Pirates in April 2014, and traded to the Athletics after the season. He played for Team Israel at the 2017 World Baseball Classic.

== Early years ==
Davis was born in Edina, Minnesota, to Millie (née Gollinger) Davis and Ron Davis. His father was a major league pitcher who pitched in 481 games in the majors in his 11-year career. His father was a power relief pitcher, and an American League All-Star in 1981. He pitched from 1978 to 1988, starting with the New York Yankees (1978–81, going 27–10 with 22 saves, primarily as the setup man for Rich Gossage). He pitched for the Minnesota Twins, Chicago Cubs, Los Angeles Dodgers, and San Francisco Giants. His father retired at the age of 32 in 1988, however, so Ike remembers more from old-timers' games, such as the one where, at age 12, he met Derek Jeter. He and his father are the 197th father-son combination to have both played in the major leagues.

Davis is Jewish through his mother. His mother, the youngest daughter of Bernard and Harriet Gollinger, is Jewish, and his father is Baptist. Davis embraces both sides of his family’s ancestry. His mother's family was from Lithuania and immigrated to the United States in the early 20th century. Of those who stayed behind, most of her family were murdered in The Holocaust during World War II.

Davis had a great aunt on his mother’s side who was a Holocaust survivor. Davis said: "She was the one who knew everything that happened. She was able to come to the United States, and she brought the story with her." Davis' paternal grandfather was an American paratrooper in the United States Army who landed in France on D-Day in 1944. He later helped liberate one of the Nazi concentration camps.

Davis' given names are Isaac and Benjamin (after his mother's grandfathers). Davis does not practice Judaism and is non-religious, but he stated: "I am really proud of my Jewish heritage." He describes himself as "culturally Jewish." He reflected: "It's funny about Judaism; It doesn’t matter if you're ultra-religious or not, as long as you know that it's in you or you're a part of it, everyone accepts you." He often uses the Jewish greeting "shalom." Davis says: "I'm glad Jewish kids get to see they can grow up to be professional baseball players."

As a youth, he attended a five-day baseball fundamentals camp that his father continues to run for children ages 5–14. His father was also his little league coach until Davis was 14.

His father said:

People would say Ike was good because his dad was a player. But it's not that easy.... I can tell Ike how to swing, I can teach him to pitch, [teach] the game of baseball, but he's the only one to make it to the big leagues. You can't teach heart and soul. That's what it takes to play in the game.

== High school ==
Davis attended Chaparral High School in Scottsdale, Arizona, where he won three state titles (2003–05). His father would throw him batting practice. He hit .559 as a sophomore, the school record, ahead of Paul Konerko's .558 in 1994. He also hit a school-record 23 doubles, breaking Konerko's record of 18. He followed that up by batting .425 as a junior (when he was also Arizona 4A Pitcher of the Year), and .450 as a senior. As a senior, he had a 92–93 mph fastball, to complement his changeup and slider. He was ranked 12th in the country by Baseball America, and was a high school All-American.

In 2003, he also pitched for the U.S.A. Youth National Team (16-under) in international play. They won the gold medal in the International Baseball Federation XI "AA" World Youth Championships in Taiwan. In 2004, he played on the U.S.A. Junior National Team (18-under). In his two seasons playing for Team U.S.A., he batted .404.

In 2004, he was one of 40 players from across the country chosen to play in the AFLAC All-American High School Baseball Classic. He won the MVP Award for the game, hitting the go-ahead home run for his team. The following year, he was MVP in the all star 2005 High School American Game.

By November 2004, the 17-year-old Davis was already 6 ft 4 in (1.93 m) and 194 pounds. In 2005, despite his having indicated he was going to go to college, he was drafted in the 19th round by the Tampa Bay Devil Rays. He elected not to sign.

Davis graduated from high school with a .447 batting average in 320 at bats, with 48 doubles (a school record, ahead of Konerko's 44), 12 home runs, and 106 runs batted in (RBIs) (third in school history). As a pitcher he was a perfect 23–0, with a 1.85 ERA, 14 saves, and 213 strikeouts (a school record) in 174 innings. His teams were 95–8 over his sophomore, junior, and senior years.

== College baseball career ==
=== Freshman year (2006) ===
Davis chose to attend Arizona State University (ASU). In October 2005, he was ranked the # 2 freshman in the nation by both Baseball America and Collegiate Baseball. He pitched (as the team's Friday night starter; the role given the "ace" of a college rotation), was the designated hitter, and played first base and corner outfield. In March 2006, he was named a Louisville Slugger National Player of the Week, Pac-10 Conference Player of the Week, and College Baseball Foundation National Honor Roll Player of the Week for a week in which he batted .588 and drove in 13 runs, in four games.

In 2006, with 65 RBIs in 227 at bats he became the first freshman ever to lead the Pac-10 in runs batted in during the regular season, and set the ASU freshman RBI record. Batting clean-up, he hit .329 with 79 hits (third all-time, for an ASU freshman), 23 doubles (tied for the Pac-10 lead, and tying the ASU record for doubles by a freshman), and a .542 slugging percentage in 58 games. His 9 home runs tied him with Bob Horner (1976) for third all-time by a Sun Devil freshman, 2 behind Barry Bonds (11, in 1983). He was also the team's opening day starter, and pitched a team-high 12 starts. He was named a Collegiate Baseball Louisville Slugger Freshman All-American, Rivals.com First-Team Freshman All-American, Baseball America Second-Team Freshman All-American, Jewish Sports Review First-Team All-American, American Baseball Coaches Association (ABCA) First-Team All-West Region, Pac-10 Freshman of the Year, and a member of the First-Team All-Pac-10.

Davis spent the first part of the summer of 2006 with Team USA. He then played in 22 games for the Anchorage Bucs of the Alaska Baseball League, and was named the # 10 prospect in the league by Baseball America.

=== Sophomore year (2007) ===
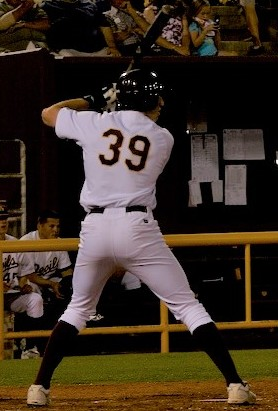
Davis at Arizona State in 2007

Davis demonstrated his versatility in an April 2007 game. He came to the mound with his team trailing 5–4, ended the inning by striking out a batter, and in the next half-inning stole home as the lead runner in a triple steal. For his sophomore season, he primarily played right field (batting .349 with 23 doubles—tied for the conference lead—and 61 RBIs, in 62 games) and pitched as a middle reliever (sporting a 1.35 ERA). He again received First-Team All-Pac-10 honors, and was named a Collegiate Baseball Louisville Slugger Third Team All-American, a National Collegiate Baseball Writers Association (NCBWA) Third-Team All-American, and again a Jewish Sports Review First-Team All-American.

In the summer of 2007, he played for the Wareham Gatemen in the Cape Cod League. A bone spur in his left wrist required surgery over the summer.

=== Junior year (2008) ===
He was named a pre-season 2008 All-Pac-10 outfielder by Rivals.com, and a pre-season Third-Team All-American by both the NCBWA and Collegiate Baseball. In consecutive weeks in March 2008 he was named both the Louisville Slugger National Player of the Week and the Pac-10 Conference Player of the Week. In the first week he hit .450 and struck out all four batters he faced. In the second week he batted .529 with a 1.412 slugging percentage, and recorded five outs from the mound, four by strikeout, without giving up a hit. He was the first Sun Devil to win the Pac-10-award in consecutive weeks since Travis Buck in 2004. The College Baseball Foundation named him to its National All-Star Lineup.

For his junior season, Davis hit .385, with a .457 on-base percentage and a .742 slugging percentage. He hit 23 doubles (tied for the Pac-10 lead), 16 home runs, and 76 RBIs in 213 at bats over 52 games, while missing 10 games with a rib oblique muscle strain. He was 4–1 as a pitcher, with a 2.25 ERA, 4 saves, 20 strikeouts in 24 innings against 4 walks, and hit 94 miles per hour on the radar gun. He also threw out four runners from right field. He was named ASU On Deck Circle Most Valuable Player; prior winners included Dustin Pedroia, Willie Bloomquist, Paul Lo Duca, and Barry Bonds. He received First-Team All-Pac-10 honors for the third straight year. He was also named a First Team All-American by Baseball America, Collegiate Baseball, the NCBWA, Rivals.com, and the ABCA. Four of his Sun Devils teammates that season went on to play in the major leagues: Brett Wallace, Jake Elmore, Jason Kipnis, and Mike Leake.

He hit .353 in his college career, with a .605 slugging percentage (10th-best in ASU history). He totaled 159 runs (8th-best), 244 hits, 33 homers (5th), 69 doubles (2nd, behind Dustin Pedroia), and 202 RBIs (3rd). On the mound, he ended his college career as the Sun Devils closer, and totaled a 7–5 mark with 4 saves and 78 strikeouts in his career. Davis was also a part of two Pac-10 Championship teams, and went to the College World Series in 2007. He was named to the ASU All-Decade team.

Scouts felt he was at his best as a batter when he used the whole field. They noted that his bat speed allowed him to wait on pitches and drive them the other way, and that he was quick enough to catch up to good fastballs. Mark Schlereth of ESPN observed: "The bigger the game, the better he plays."

== Minor leagues ==
Davis was the 18th player taken in the first round of the 2008 Major League Baseball draft, chosen by the New York Mets in his junior year as compensation for the Mets' loss of Tom Glavine to the Atlanta Braves in free agency. He was drafted for his power bat. Baseball America ranked him the third-best college power hitter in the draft, and The New York Times indicated that he projects to hit 25–30 home runs. He signed for $1.575 million.

Davis said, "It was a huge thrill. I was excited to be picked by New York." He received fatherly advice from his dad, and recalled:

He just said they've got the best fans, and it's a blast because every game is live or die for them. It's a great environment to grow up playing baseball, and learning how to play under pressure in front of all those people. He loved it, and I'm looking forward to it, too.

Davis was assigned to the Single-A Brooklyn Cyclones. On defense, he excelled, as he committed only one error in 492 total chances at first base, for a league-leading .998 fielding percentage. Uncharacteristically, he struggled on offense, batting only .256, without a home run in 58 games. Asked the following year to name his most embarrassing professional moment, he replied: "Not hitting one home run in my first professional season." He noted:

It was first time I ever swung wood full time. I was learning how to play pro ball. I had never played every day in my life. That's totally different.... You have to learn to conserve your energy. In college, you just left it all out on the field every game. In pro ball, you do that and you'll wear out, because you play every single day.

In 2009, Davis started the year with the St. Lucie Mets. He began to turn it around, hitting .289 with 7 home runs in 59 games. He was then promoted to the Double-A Binghamton Mets, where he came into his own, hitting .309 with 13 home runs, 41 RBIs, and a .565 slugging percentage in half a season. Mako Oliveras, the B-Mets manager, described him by saying: "Very live bat; the ball jumps off his bat when he makes contact. And as for defense, he's like a vacuum cleaner." For 2009, Davis was named the Mets Organizational Player of the Year.

After the season the Mets assigned him to the Surprise Rafters of the Arizona Fall League, where he hit .391. He was named to the Arizona Fall League's all star Rising Stars Game. In September 2009, he played for the gold-medal-winning U.S.A. World Cup team. In the off-season, Baseball America rated him the Mets’ No. 4 prospect.

Promoted to the Buffalo Bisons, the Mets' Triple-A affiliate, to start the 2010 season, he hit .364 with a .500 on-base percentage in 10 games.

For the week ending June 24, 2013, Davis was the Pacific Coast League's Player of the Week. In 2013, in 10 games with the AAA Las Vegas 51s, he batted .364 with a .500 on-base percentage and a .636 slugging percentage.

In his minor league career, he batted .289, with a .376 OBP and a .487 slugging percentage in 752 at bats.

== Major leagues ==
=== New York Mets ===
==== 2010 ====
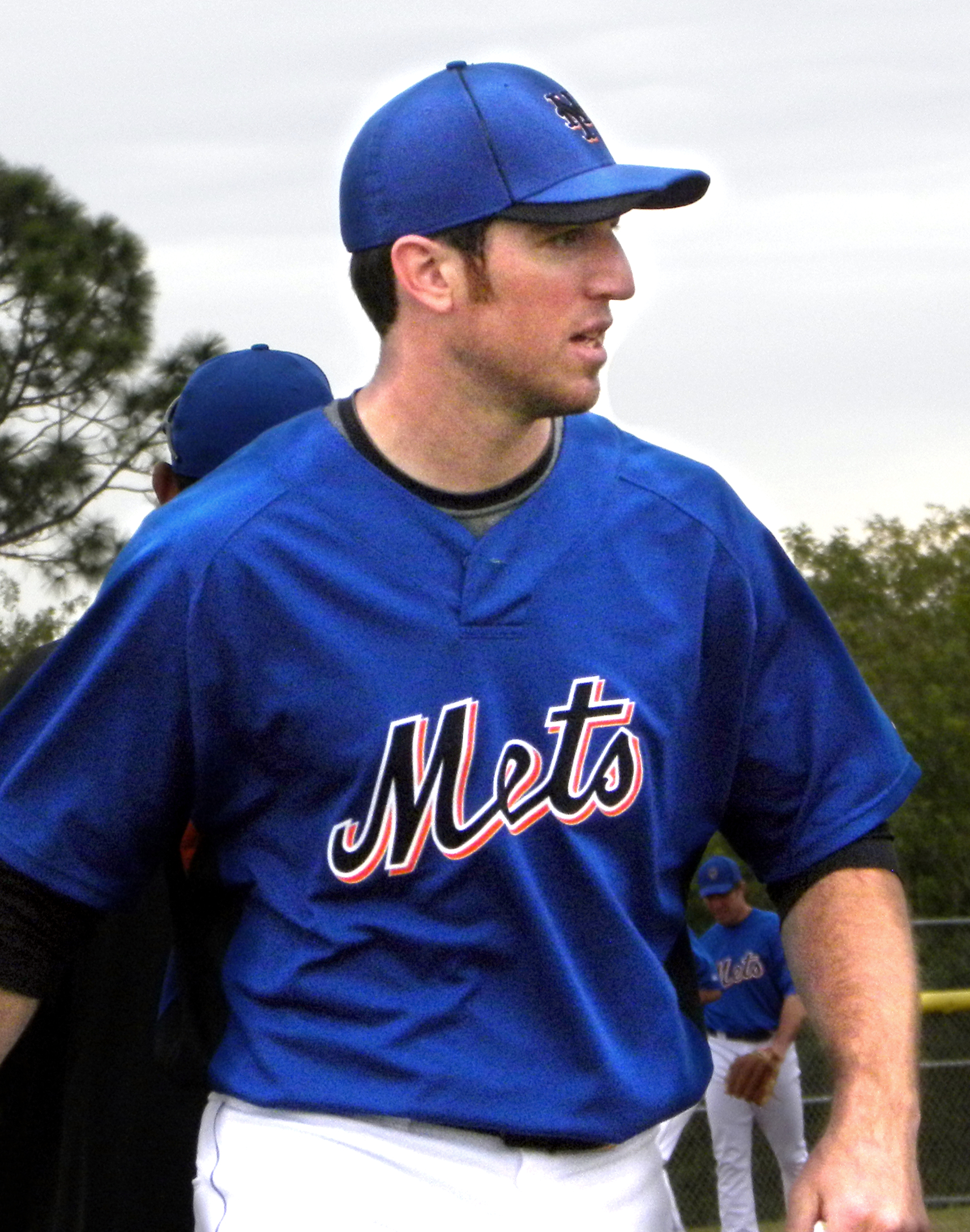
Ike Davis at 2010 spring training

Davis played in spring training with the Mets in 2010, and led the team with a .480 average as he hit 3 homers. He also sparkled on defense, prompting José Reyes to observe: "People talk about his hitting, but he is one of the best defensive first basemen you will ever see for a player his age." Many Mets players were rooting for Davis to break camp with the team, but he was sent down to the minors at the end of spring training. On April 19, however, the Mets purchased Davis's minor league contract. At that point Davis had played only 65 games in his life above the Single-A level.

Davis made his debut at Citi Field on April 19 against the Chicago Cubs. He singled in his first at bat, and had two singles in four at bats in a Mets win. "This is awesome," he gushed. In a sign of acceptance and welcome, after the victory Mets veteran Jeff Francoeur slapped a shaving-cream pie in his face. Davis had two multi-hit games in his first four games. In his fifth game, on April 23, he hit his first home run. It traveled 450 feet (140 m), onto Shea Bridge at Citi Field, and was the longest home run of any Met at Citi Field. He had his first multi-home-run game on May 7.

A gifted, slick-fielding defensive first baseman, in 3 of his first 21 games he made spectacular catches of foul pop-ups, bracing himself against the railing in front of the first base dugout, and then flipping over the railing as he caught the ball. The 6 ft 4 in (1.93 m) Davis said: "I'm going to try to catch any ball I can. I've got long arms, I guess. I'd rather end the game, than worry about getting a bruise."

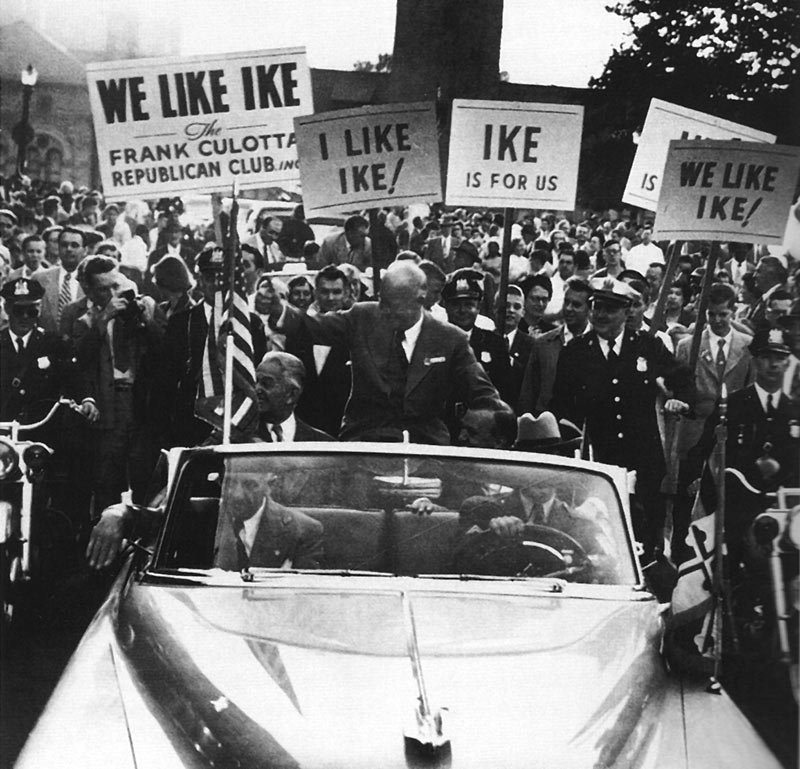
"I Like Ike" banners during Eisenhower's 1952 presidential campaign; the banners were reprised in Davis's rookie season

The Met fans began to treat him like a folk hero. The New York Post described him as a "cult hero." Within a month of his debut, he had become a fan favorite. "I Like Ike" banners began appearing at Citi Field, a phrase once used in the decades-prior presidential campaigns of Dwight D. Eisenhower. Weeks later, he recalled:

I had such nerves the first few days. I didn't even have an approach. It was just see the ball, hit the ball. Only now am I settling in, getting the chance to think about how a pitcher is going to approach me.

While the Mets had appeared uncertain whether Davis could handle the pressure of the major leagues as spring training ended, by mid-May—just a month after calling him up to the majors—they moved him to the cleanup spot in the batting order. Manager Jerry Manuel said: "I think we're going to try to leave him there for a while. I think he's ready to handle that."

On June 8, Davis hit his first career walk off home run, against the Padres' Edward Mujica. His 11 home runs prior to the All Star break tied with Benny Agbayani (1999) for the second-most by a Mets rookie, behind Ron Swoboda (15, in 1965).

By September 26, as advanced defense metrics reflected a "UZR/150" (ultimate zone rating) of 12.5, putting him second in baseball behind Oakland's Daric Barton, sportswriter Mike Silva mused as to whether he could win a Gold Glove. Using the advanced metric Defensive Runs Saved, sportswriter John Dewan indicated that Davis was best in the NL and second-best in baseball, having saved 14 runs, again behind only Barton in the majors. He showed good range, and saved a number of throws with his soft hands on scoops.

For the season, he was second among all NL rookies in runs (73), doubles (33), walks (72), extra-base hits (53), on-base percentage (.351), and OPS (.791). He was also third in RBIs (71) and slugging percentage (.440), and tied for third in home runs (19).

He set the Mets rookie record for total bases (230). He also tied Lee Mazzilli's 1977 Mets rookie record in walks (72) and Ty Wigginton's 2003 Mets rookie record in extra-base hits (53). He was second among rookies in Mets history with 33 doubles (behind Wigginton), his 19 home runs tied for second-most with Ron Swoboda (1965), behind Darryl Strawberry (1983), his 71 RBIs tied for second with Wigginton, behind Strawberry, and his 138 hits were 4th on the Mets all-time list (behind Jay Payton—2000, Ron Hunt—1963, and Wigginton).

Davis was named the first baseman on Baseball America's 2010 All-Rookie Team. He came in 7th in the voting for 2010 NL Rookie of the Year, receiving two third-place votes.

==== 2011 ====
Davis started the 2011 season by establishing a Mets record, with at least one RBI in 9 of his first 10 games. On May 10, he sustained a left ankle sprain and bone bruise, initially misdiagnosed by the Mets as a strained calf, in a collision with third baseman David Wright. The injury occurred on a routine popup near the pitcher's mound, with Davis rolling his ankle in an injury that didn't appear very serious at the time. On June 22, he was told that the injury might require season-ending surgery. On September 6, ESPN reported that Davis was rehabbing his ankle and would not need surgery.

During his injury-shortened 2011 season, Davis batted .302 with a .925 OPS, in 139 at bats in 36 games. He hit 7 home runs, and had 25 RBIs.

In 2011, Davis also appeared on an episode of the fourth season of MTV's game show Silent Library.

==== 2012 ====
In early March 2012, Davis was diagnosed with valley fever, a rare dust-borne fungal infection endemic in the American southwest. The effects of it lingered with him for years.

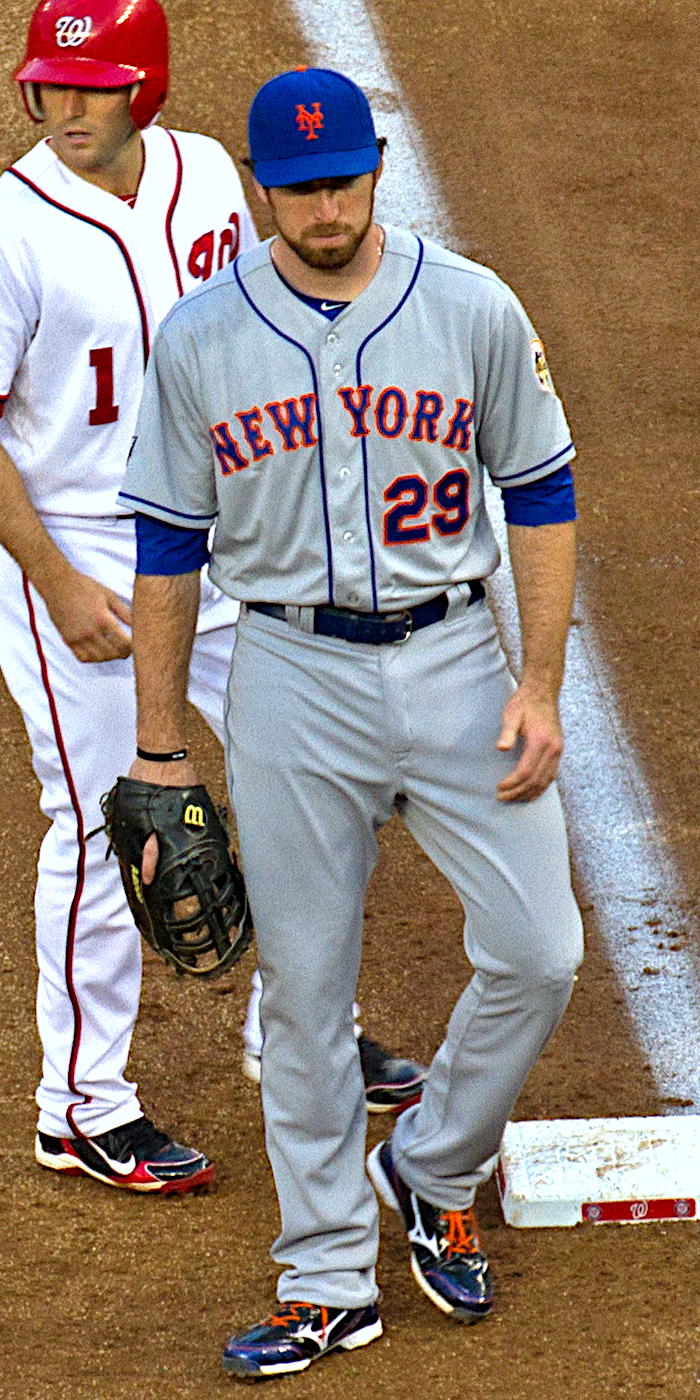
Davis playing for the New York Mets in 2012

Davis started the season slowly, but then began hitting, getting one homer in each of three games of a four-game span in mid-April. On May 24, he had the second-lowest batting average (.159) of all qualified major leaguers. As of June 15, he had raised his batting average to .188. On June 18, Davis hit his first career grand slam against Jake Arrieta of the Orioles. The grand slam also extended his hitting streak to 9 games, and Davis hit .462 (12-for-26) during the span. After the hot streak Davis cooled and again struggled. Davis was ejected from a Major League game for the first time in his career on June 26, when he argued with umpire Manny Gonzalez after Steve Clevenger was ruled safe at first on a pickoff attempt. In June, he had 10 consecutive extra-base hits (five home runs and five doubles), the second-longest such streak in Mets history.

On July 28, Davis hit home runs in his first three at bats (all solo home runs) against the Arizona Diamondbacks' Ian Kennedy, eventually going 4-for-4 (adding a single in his final at bat). Davis became only the 9th Met in history to hit 3 home runs in one game. The 3 homers in one game were also a career high for Davis; with them he also reached 20 home runs for the season, breaking his prior year high of 19 home runs.

He ended the 2012 season with a .227 batting average, 32 home runs (5th in the National League), and 90 RBIs, as his home-run-every-16.2-at-bats was 3rd in the NL behind Giancarlo Stanton and Ryan Braun. He became the 16th Met to surpass 30 home runs in a season. On defense, his fielding percentage of .994 at first base was 5th-best in the league.

==== 2013 ====
Davis struggled early in 2013 and became a subject of criticism for many Mets fans and sports analysts. In June, Davis was sent down to Triple-A Las Vegas for 10 games, in which he batted .364. He was recalled in early July. He tied a team record set by John Olerud in 1998, by reaching base at least twice in 12 straight starts from July 29 – August 13. He recovered to hit .286 in the second half, with a .449 on-base percentage. For the season, he batted .205 with 9 home runs and 33 RBIs for the Mets, in 103 games.

==== 2014 ====
Davis was the 2014 Opening Day starting first baseman for the Mets. Early in the season he was platooned with Lucas Duda and Josh Satin. On April 4, Mets' manager Terry Collins announced that Duda would get the bulk of the playing time at first base. On April 5, Davis hit a walk-off grand slam coming off the bench against the Cincinnati Reds.

=== Pittsburgh Pirates ===
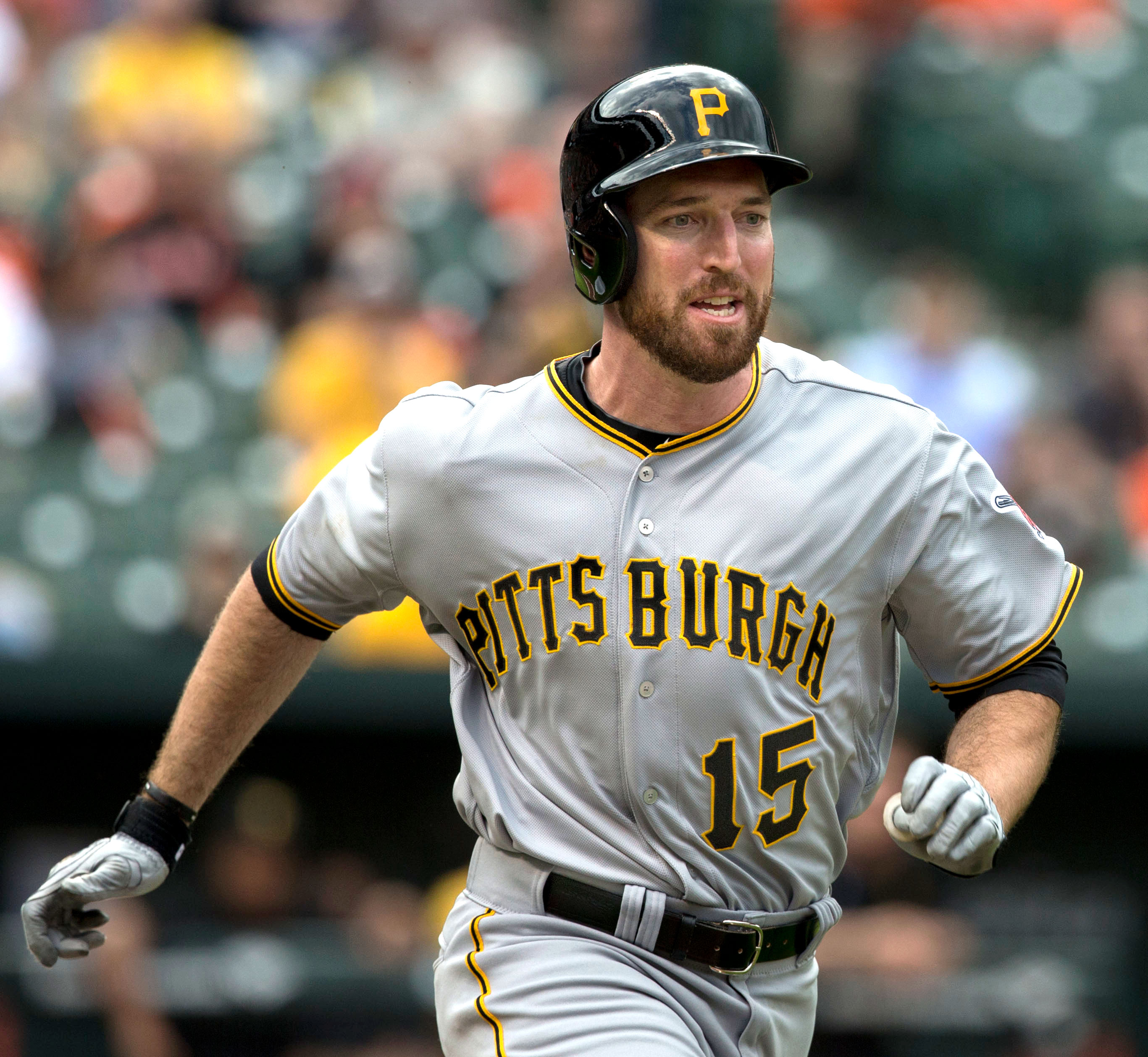
Davis during his tenure with the Pittsburgh Pirates in 2014

On April 18, 2014, the Mets traded Davis to the Pittsburgh Pirates in exchange for Zack Thornton and a player to be named later, Blake Taylor. Davis hit another grand slam against the Reds on April 21, becoming the third player in MLB history to switch teams midseason and hit a grand slam against the same opponent (following Ray Boone in 1953, and Mike Piazza in 1998), and the first player to hit grand slams for different teams in the same April. Overall, in Pittsburgh he hit .235 with 10 home runs and 46 RBIs in 336 at-bats, splitting time with Gaby Sanchez at first.

For the season, on defense he had the best Range Factor/9 Innings of all major league first basemen, at 10.59. With the bases loaded, he tied for second in the National League in grand slams (2), and tied for fourth in RBIs (17). As a pinch hitter, he tied for second in the NL in home runs (3) and RBIs (12).

Davis was designated for assignment by the Pirates on November 20, 2014.

=== Oakland Athletics ===
On November 23, 2014, the Pirates traded Davis to the Oakland Athletics in exchange for bonus slots for use in signing international free agents.

On April 21, 2015, Davis pitched a perfect eighth inning in the losing side of a blowout against the Los Angeles Angels of Anaheim, retiring all 3 batters he faced, all on ground balls, using only 9 pitches. Davis in high school was 23–0 with a 1.85 ERA and was the Arizona High School Pitcher of the Year, and in college he had a 2.25 ERA as a pitcher. Against the Angels he threw his fastball as high as 88 miles per hour, threw a slider in the high 70s, and threw a cutter. It was the first time the A’s had a position player pitch since Frank Menechino in 2000.

On August 21, 2015, it was announced Davis would undergo surgery to repair a torn hip labrum, ending his season.

=== Texas Rangers ===
On February 15, 2016, Davis signed a minor league contract with the Texas Rangers. Hampered by injuries throughout spring training, Davis was assigned to the Triple-A Round Rock Express to begin the season. On June 12, Davis was released from his contract in order to pursue a major league opportunity elsewhere. In 39 games with the Express, Davis hit .268/.350/.437 with 4 HR, 25 RBI, and 37 strikeouts.

=== New York Yankees ===
On June 12, 2016, Davis agreed to a major league contract with the New York Yankees. The Yankees' depth at first base was very thin, with four first basemen on the disabled list, and middle infielder Rob Refsnyder manning the position at the major league level at the time of his signing. Overall, for the Yankees Ike hit .214 with no home runs and 1 RBI in 14 at-bats. He was designated for assignment by the Yankees on June 25. Two days later, he was outrighted from the 40-man roster to the Scranton/Wilkes-Barre RailRiders of the Triple-A International League. On August 10, Davis was released by the organization.

=== Los Angeles Dodgers ===
Davis signed a minor league contract with the Los Angeles Dodgers on January 27, 2017. He began the 2017 season playing first base for the Oklahoma City Dodgers of the AAA Pacific Coast League. In 35 games, he hit .212/.258/.412 for Oklahoma City. After the season, Jeff Passan of Yahoo Sports ranked him the 13th-best free agent first baseman.

In midseason, Davis switched to pitching and made his debut on the mound for the Arizona League Dodgers, pitching one scoreless inning, striking out the side as his fastball was in the 88-92 mph range. He pitched in six games in the Arizona League at the end of the season, allowing no runs and only three hits in 5 2/3 innings, with six strikeouts. Dodgers catcher Kyle Farmer said: "He has a live fastball, really good changeup, and he’s working on his slider right now." On November 6, he elected to be a free agent. He retired in November 2018.

== Team Israel ==
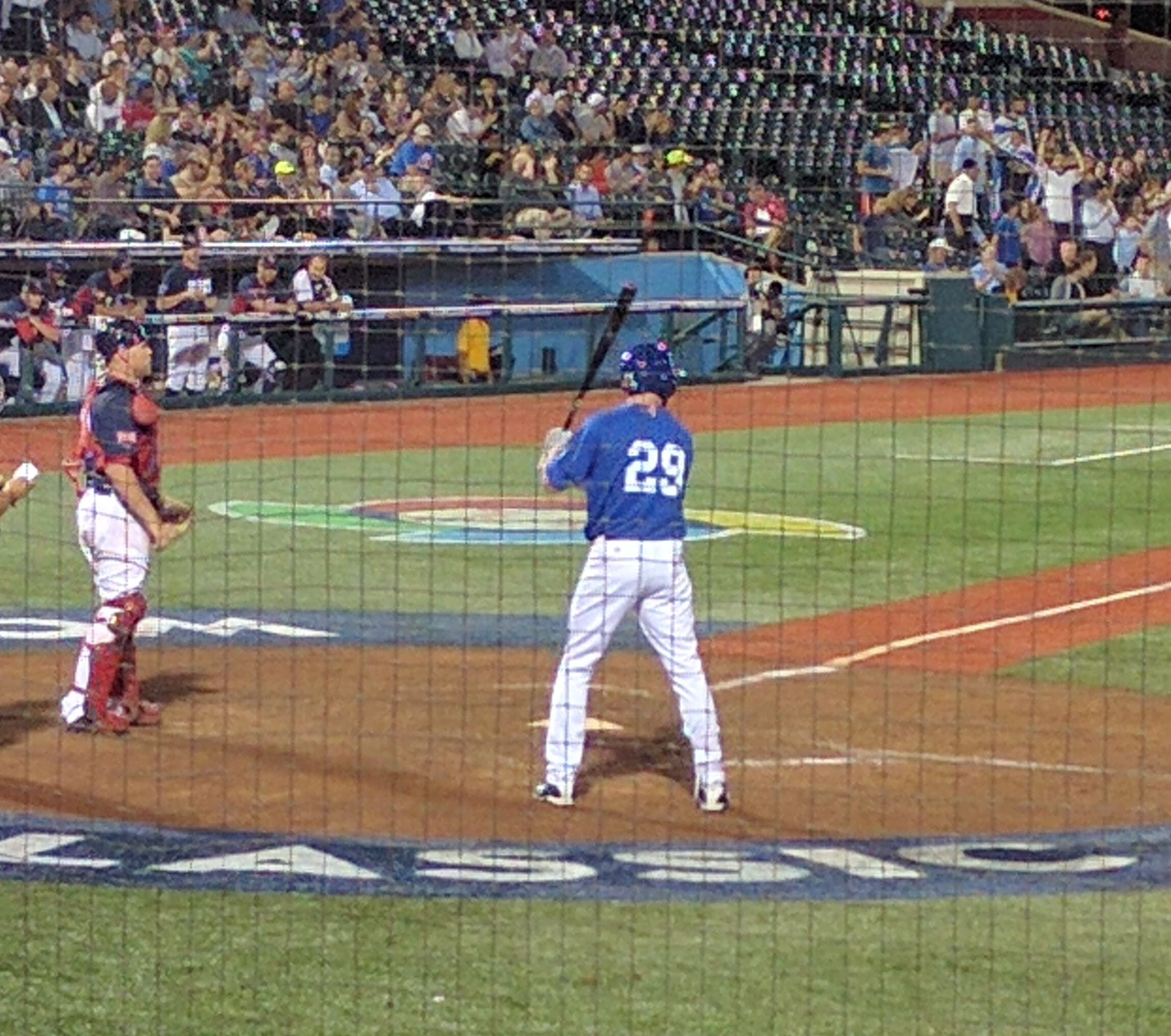
Davis playing for Israel at the 2017 World Baseball Classic qualifier

Davis, although eligible to play for Israel at the 2013 World Baseball Classic was unable to participate in the qualifying round due to being an active player for the Mets. Israel was ultimately eliminated during the qualifying round, eliminating the chance for Davis to play for them during the 2013 tournament.

Davis played in the qualifying round for Israel at the 2017 World Baseball Classic. During game one, Davis came on as a pinch hitter in the bottom of the 7th. After facing a 3-2 count, Davis fouled off three straight pitches before picking up an RBI single that drove in Zach Borenstein to give Israel a 4-2 lead. In the second game, Davis started at first, going 0-2 with two walks and a stolen base. During the third and final game, Davis was the starting DH, going 0-3 before being taken out for pinch hitter Charlie Cutler.

Davis played for Israel at the 2017 World Baseball Classic in March 2017. He batted .471/.571/.706 with 2 doubles and a triple, scoring 5 runs and driving in 3 RBIs in 17 at bats.

== See also ==
- List of Jewish Major League Baseball players
- List of second-generation Major League Baseball players

Preceded by Daniel Murphy and Nick Evans	Mets Organizational Player of the Year; 2009	Succeeded by Lucas Duda
