= Nick Evans (baseball) =

American baseball player (born 1986)

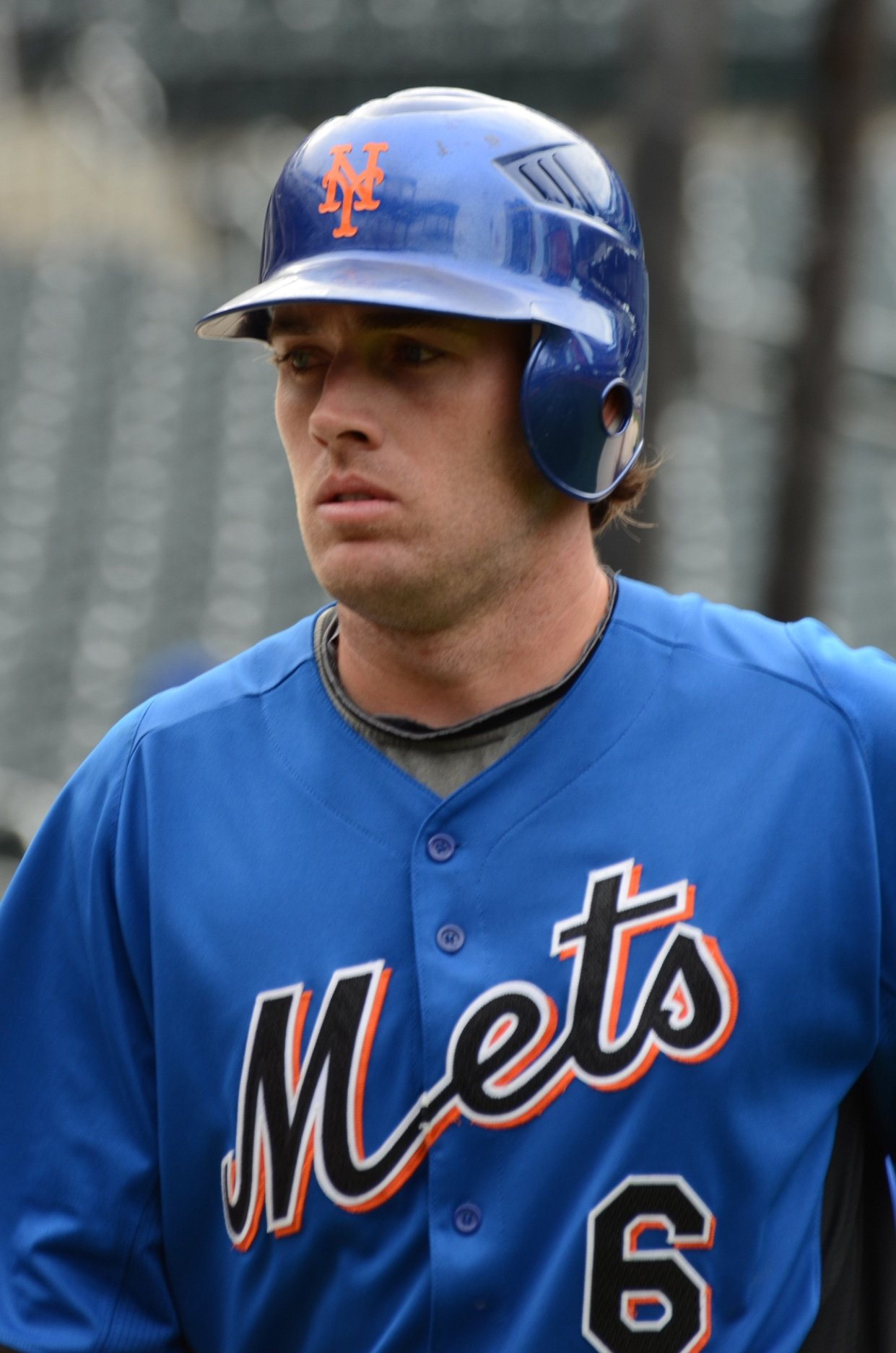
- Evans with the New York Mets
- First baseman / Left fielder
- Born: January 30, 1986 (age 40); Glendale, Arizona, U.S.
- Batted: Right Threw: Right

Professional debut
- MLB: May 24, 2008, for the New York Mets
- NPB: August 5, 2014, for the Tohoku Rakuten Golden Eagles
- KBO: April 1, 2016, for the Doosan Bears

Last appearance
- MLB: July 27, 2014, for the Arizona Diamondbacks
- NPB: August 13, 2014, for the Tohoku Rakuten Golden Eagles
- KBO: October 3, 2017, for the Doosan Bears

MLB statistics
- Batting average: .257
- Home runs: 10
- Runs batted in: 53

NPB statistics
- Batting average: .111
- Home runs: 0
- Runs batted in: 1

KBO statistics
- Batting average: .301
- Home runs: 51
- Runs batted in: 171
- Stats at Baseball Reference

Teams
- New York Mets (2008–2011); Arizona Diamondbacks (2014); Tohoku Rakuten Golden Eagles (2014); Doosan Bears (2016–2017)

Career highlights and awards
- Korean Series champion (2016)

Nicholas Reginald Evans (born January 30, 1986) is an American former professional baseball infielder. He played in Major League Baseball (MLB) for the New York Mets and Arizona Diamondbacks, in Nippon Professional Baseball for the Tohoku Rakuten Golden Eagles, and in the KBO League for the Doosan Bears.

Evans primarily played first base in the minor leagues, only beginning to play the outfield in the 2008 season.

== Professional career ==
=== New York Mets ===
Evans was born in Glendale, Arizona. He was selected out of St. Mary's High School in Phoenix, Arizona, by the Mets in the fifth round of the 2004 MLB draft.

Evans was called up from Double-A Binghamton on May 24, 2008, to replace Marlon Anderson, who had been placed on the disabled list. He started in left field for the Mets and batted eighth.

In Evans' first career at bat, he doubled off Colorado Rockies pitcher Jeff Francis. He finished the game with three doubles, the first Met to hit three extra-base hits in his major league debut since Kazuo Matsui in 2004. Evans became the first player in National League history to hit three doubles in his first game.

Evans was optioned back down to Binghamton on June 6 after batting .174 in nine games when the Mets decided to call upon Abraham Núñez for infield depth. Evans was again recalled on July 8 after Ryan Church went on the disabled list.

Evans finally received his first Major League start at first base, his natural position, on August 7, 2008, after only previously playing one inning there with the Mets.

On August 31, 2008, Evans hit his first career Major League home run against the Florida Marlins off pitcher Scott Olsen.

Evans began the 2009 season in Triple-A Buffalo, but was eventually sent down to Double-A Binghamton. On June 19, Evans was called up by the Mets. He hit his first home run of the year on June 24.

On August 25, 2009, Nick was recalled along with pitcher Pat Misch when Billy Wagner was traded to the Boston Red Sox, and Johan Santana was placed on the 15-day disabled list.

On May 18, 2011, he was recalled to replace David Wright after he went on the 15-day disabled list with a stress fracture in his back. On June 10, Evans was designated for assignment to make room for Lucas Duda. He had his contract purchased again on July 7, after Jose Reyes went on the 15-day disabled list. He was designated for assignment again on July 22.

On November 22, 2011, Evans signed a minor league contract with the Pittsburgh Pirates. On April 30, 2012, in a game between the Indianapolis Indians and the Durham Bulls, Evans left the game in the eighth inning after injuring his wrist. He dove for a ball in foul territory, and landed on his wrist after his glove bent backwards on the ground. Evans immediately left the field and was replaced by Jake Fox. He broke three bones in his left hand. Evans underwent surgery on May 3, to insert pins in his broken left hand. He began a rehab assignment with the Gulf Coast League Pirates on August 2, 2012. However, he did not return to Indianapolis before the season ended. In November 2012, Evans became a free agent.

=== Los Angeles Dodgers ===
He signed a minor league contract with the Los Angeles Dodgers on November 20, 2012, which contained an invitation to spring training. On March 18, 2013, he was released by the Dodgers after failing to win a job with the team.

=== Arizona Diamondbacks ===
Evans signed with the Arizona Diamondbacks on March 29, 2013. He was assigned to the Double-A Mobile BayBears to regain his form after a lost 2012 season. In 133 games for the BayBears at first and third base, he hit .267 with 19 home runs (fourth in the Southern League) and 81 RBI (third). He was also a mid-season All-Star as the South Division's starting designated hitter. Evans began 2014 with Triple-A Reno, where in 44 games, he was hitting .335 with 11 home runs and 44 RBI until earning a promotion. Evans, a native of Glendale, Arizona, grew up rooting for the Dbacks.

On May 28, 2014, Evans was called up to replace outfielder Alfredo Marte. He appeared in his first major league game since September 28, 2011, that night as a defensive replacement for first baseman Paul Goldschmidt. Evans recorded his first hit with Arizona in his first start on June 3. On June 12, Evans was designated for assignment to make room for recently claimed Jordan Pacheco. He cleared waivers and was sent outright to the Triple-A Reno Aces on June 16. Evans was called back up on June 27. He was released by the Diamondbacks on July 28.

=== Tohoku Rakuten Golden Eagles ===
Evans signed with the Tohoku Rakuten Golden Eagles of Nippon Professional Baseball on July 28, 2014.

=== Doosan Bears ===
Evans signed a minor league contract with the San Diego Padres in November 2015. However, only a few weeks later, he decided to sign with the Doosan Bears of the Korea Baseball Organization for a one-year contract worth $550,000.

== Coaching career ==
Evans retired and was named as a coach for the Visalia Rawhide of the Arizona Diamondbacks organization for the 2019 season. On January 24, 2026, Evans was announced as an assistant director in the player development department for Arizona.

Preceded by Anderson Hernández	Mets Organizational Player of the Year (with Daniel Murphy); 2009	Succeeded by Ike Davis
