= Daniel Murphy (baseball) =

American baseball player (born 1985)

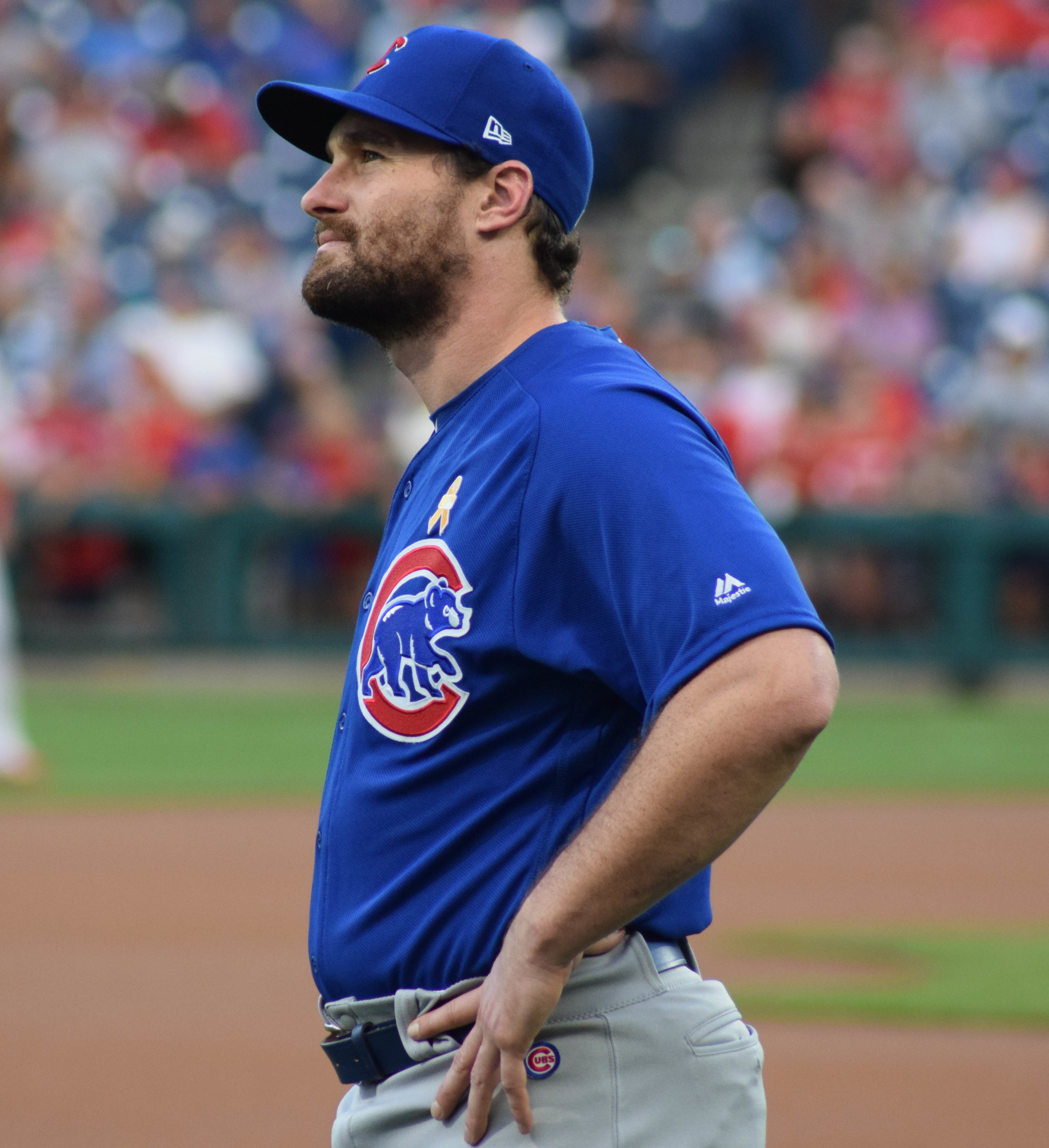
- Murphy with the Chicago Cubs in 2018
- Second baseman / First baseman
- Born: April 1, 1985 (age 41); Jacksonville, Florida, U.S.
- Batted: Left Threw: Right

MLB debut
- August 2, 2008, for the New York Mets

Last MLB appearance
- September 26, 2020, for the Colorado Rockies

MLB statistics
- Batting average: .296
- Home runs: 138
- Runs batted in: 735
- Stats at Baseball Reference

Teams
- New York Mets (2008–2009, 2011–2015); Washington Nationals (2016–2018); Chicago Cubs (2018); Colorado Rockies (2019–2020)

Career highlights and awards
- 3× All-Star (2014, 2016, 2017); NLCS MVP (2015); 2× Silver Slugger Award (2016, 2017)
Medals
Men's baseball
Representing United States
World Baseball Classic
Gold medal – first place	2017 Los Angeles	Team

Daniel Thomas Murphy (born April 1, 1985) is an American former professional baseball second baseman and first baseman. He played in Major League Baseball (MLB) for the New York Mets, Washington Nationals, Chicago Cubs, and Colorado Rockies. While primarily a second baseman, he also played first base, third base, and left field. Murphy was an MLB All-Star in 2014, 2016, and 2017. Internationally, Murphy represents the United States. In the 2017 World Baseball Classic (WBC), he helped win Team USA's first gold medal in a WBC tournament.

En route to leading the Mets to their fifth World Series appearance in franchise history, he won the National League Championship Series MVP Award in 2015, setting a record for consecutive postseason games with a home run with six.

== Early life ==
Daniel Murphy was born in Jacksonville, Florida, to Tom and Sharon Murphy. Murphy has a younger brother, Jonathan, and a sister, Tricia. Murphy began playing baseball at the age of five years and played his high school ball at Englewood High School in Jacksonville. Jacksonville University was the only four-year school to offer Murphy a scholarship.

== College baseball ==
Murphy attended Jacksonville University, where he played college baseball for the Dolphins under head coach Terry Alexander. In college, he was regarded as a strong hitter, but a below-average fielder. As a freshman, when asked to introduce himself and name what position he played (implying his defensive position), Murphy instead gave his preferred position in the batting order: "I'm Daniel Murphy from Jacksonville and I hit third." He mostly played third base but was also slotted into right field to minimize the defensive liability. As a junior in 2006, Murphy posted a .398 batting average en route to being named the A-Sun Baseball Player of the Year.

== Professional baseball career ==
=== New York Mets ===
The New York Mets selected Murphy in the 13th round, with the 394th overall pick, of the 2006 MLB draft. The first two months of Murphy's professional career were spent rehabilitating a knee injury he suffered late in his college career.

==== 2007–2011 ====
Murphy spent the entire 2007 season with the High-A St. Lucie Mets of the Florida State League. He began the 2008 season with the Double-A Binghamton Mets. On August 2, 2008, a day after being promoted to the Triple-A New Orleans Zephyrs, the Mets left-handed reserve outfielder Marlon Anderson was placed on the disabled list, and Murphy was called up to the majors. In his first major league at bat, against three-time All-Star Roy Oswalt, Murphy hit a single. Later in the same game, he made a difficult catch against the left field wall, throwing out Hunter Pence at second base for a double play to end the inning. As of August 9, Murphy was only the fifth Mets rookie to record 10 hits in his first 20 at bats. Murphy hit his first home run in the bottom of the sixth inning against the Florida Marlins at Shea Stadium on August 9. He finished the season batting .313, with two home runs and 17 runs batted in (RBIs).

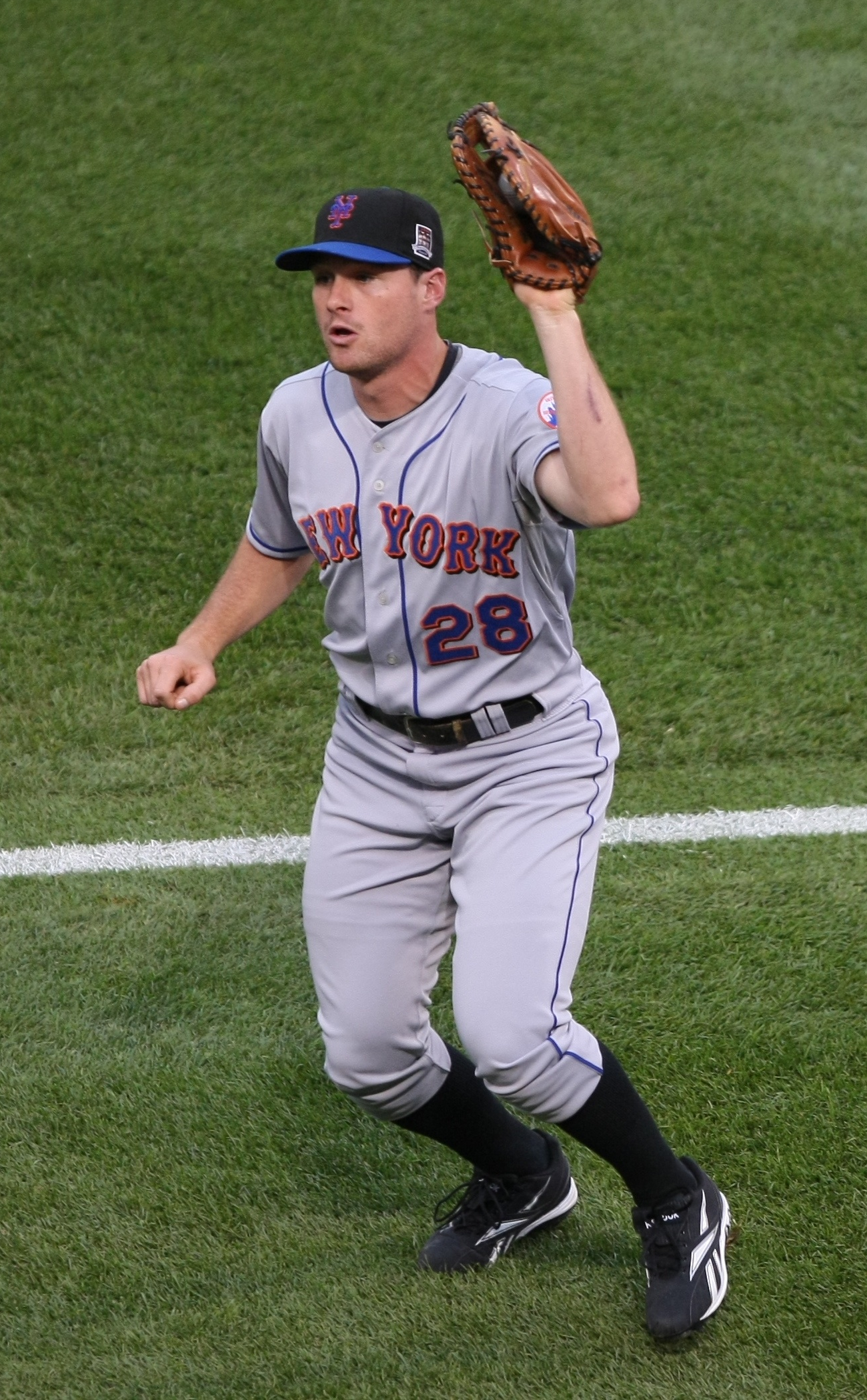
Murphy with the New York Mets in 2009

Although he is a natural third baseman, Murphy began to play left field in 2008, and continued in 2009, due to the presence of David Wright on the Mets. Murphy had a hard time transitioning to left field. In May, Carlos Delgado underwent hip surgery and Murphy moved to first base. Murphy led the Mets in home runs, with 12. This tied 1977 as the season with the fewest home runs to lead a Mets team in franchise history.

On March 30, 2010, Murphy hurt his knee in a spring training game against the St. Louis Cardinals in a rundown between third base and home plate. On June 2, while playing second base for the Buffalo Bisons, the Mets' Triple-A affiliate, he suffered a "high-grade" MCL tear while trying to turn a double play. Although surgery was not needed, he was expected to miss 4–6 months.

The following year, Murphy suffered a season-ending injury to his MCL on August 7, 2011 after a collision with the Atlanta Braves' José Constanza. At the time of his season-ending injury, Murphy had the 3rd highest batting average in the National League. However, Murphy did not have enough at-bats to qualify as a league leader at the conclusion of the 2011 season.

==== 2012–2014 ====
Murphy began the 2012 season as the Mets' starting second baseman after recovering from his MCL injury from 2011. On April 9, 2012, he hit a walk-off single against the Washington Nationals to give the Mets a 4–3 victory, and their first 4–0 start since 2007. After going 352 at-bats since his last home run on July 16, 2011, Murphy hit two against the Chicago Cubs on June 27. Murphy was named as the Mets nominee for the 2012 MLBPAA Heart & Hustle Award, which was ultimately won by Mike Trout of the Los Angeles Angels of Anaheim.

Murphy had a strained muscle on his right side during spring training. He returned to training on February 20, said he didn't have a timetable for his return to regular workouts. For the period ending September 1, Murphy was named the National League Player of the Week after accumulating five doubles, seven runs and 13 hits. Murphy had a strong 2013, establishing himself as one of the best offensive 2nd basemen in the league. He played in 161 games and batted .286. He also finished 2nd in the National League with 188 hits. Murphy also contributed 13 home runs and 78 RBIs. Murphy led the NL in stolen base success rate, swiping 23/26 bases, an 88.4 percent success rate. Following the season, he was again nominated for the MLBPAA Heart & Hustle Award, this time losing out to Boston Red Sox second baseman Dustin Pedroia. Murphy was named to his first MLB All-Star Game in 2014 as the backup to starter Chase Utley. His roster position was announced on July 6, at which time he had 105 hits (second in the NL) and a .295 batting average.

==== 2015 ====
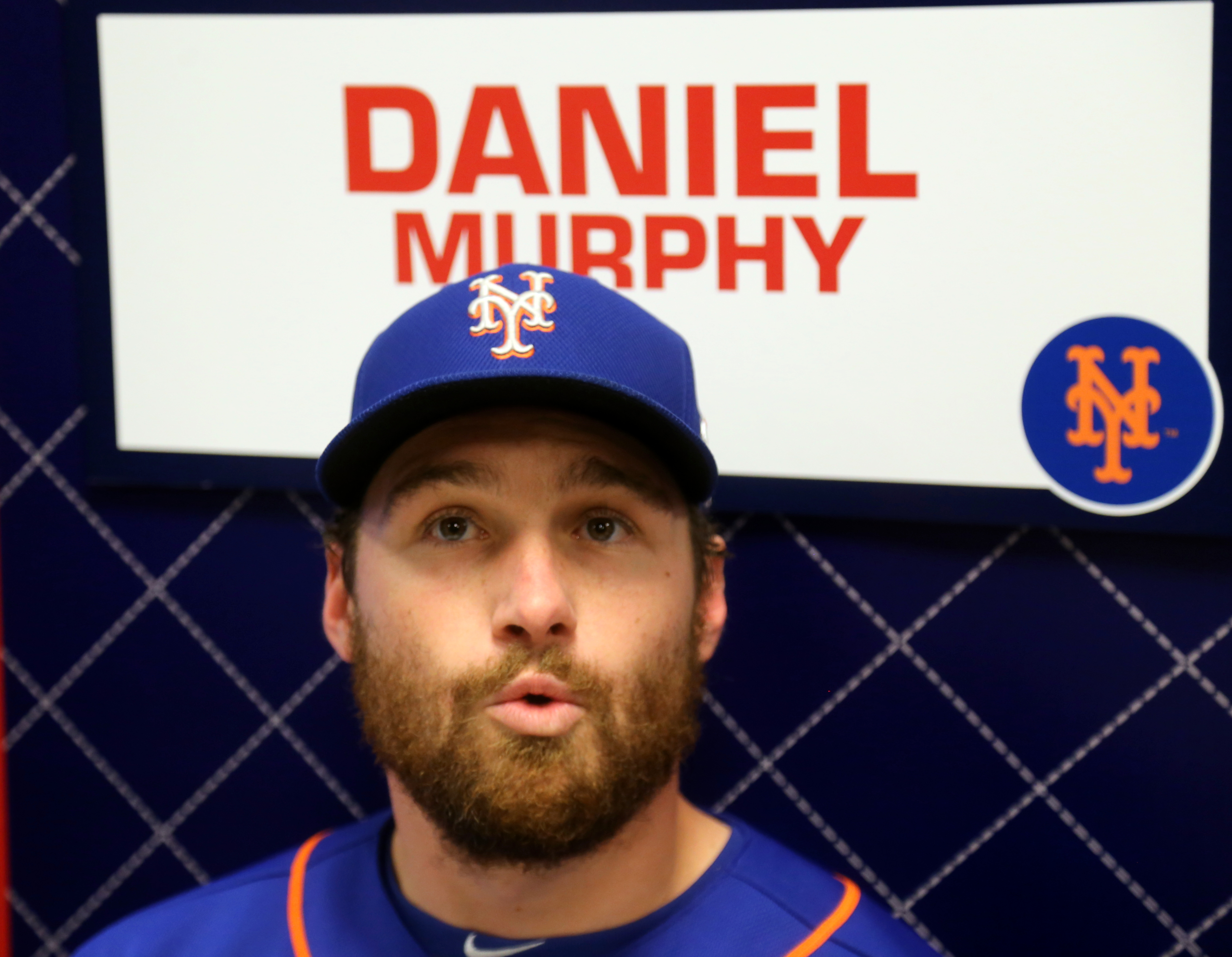
Murphy on 2015 World Series Media Day

In 2015, after an injury to David Wright, Murphy was moved to third base on June 4. He spent the regular season splitting his time between first base, second base, and third base. Murphy hit the 225th and 226th doubles of his career in a game against the Atlanta Braves on September 22, giving him the second-most doubles in Mets franchise history, ahead of Ed Kranepool and behind Wright. In the deciding 5th game of the National League Division Series (NLDS) against the Los Angeles Dodgers, Murphy had three hits, including the game-winning home run in the sixth inning, to lead the Mets to a 3–2 win. He had also scored the Mets' second run of the game, after singling, going first-to-third on a walk, and scoring on a sacrifice foul-out. For the entire NLDS, Murphy had five RBI and seven hits in 21 at-bats, three of them being home runs and one of them being a double, giving him a 1.143 OPS.

Over the course of the NLDS and National League Championship Series (NLCS), Murphy became the first person in MLB history to hit a home run in six consecutive postseason games, beating a record set by Carlos Beltrán, and became the second person, after Lou Gehrig, to have a hit, a run, and an RBI in seven consecutive postseason games. He also broke a Mets franchise record for most home runs in the postseason, previously held by Mike Piazza. He hit .529 with four home runs, a double and six RBI and was named the 2015 NLCS MVP.

During the eighth inning of Game 4 of the World Series against the Kansas City Royals, the Mets, having lost two of the first three games, were trying to hold onto a 3–2 lead with two runners on base for the Royals. Eric Hosmer hit a grounder that needed Murphy to try and make a fielding play. However, Murphy made a key fielding error that not only led to a run scoring but also kept two runners on base with one out. Baseball Reference determined the play was the biggest moment in change of win probability (32%). The Royals went on to win 5–3 after scoring two more runs in the 8th inning. Murphy tallied two errors and only three hits in his 20 at-bats as the Mets lost the series in five games.

During the offseason, the Mets offered Murphy a one-year, $15.8 million qualifying offer. On November 13, Murphy rejected the offer, thus becoming a free agent. This ensured the Mets a compensation draft pick if he signed with another team.

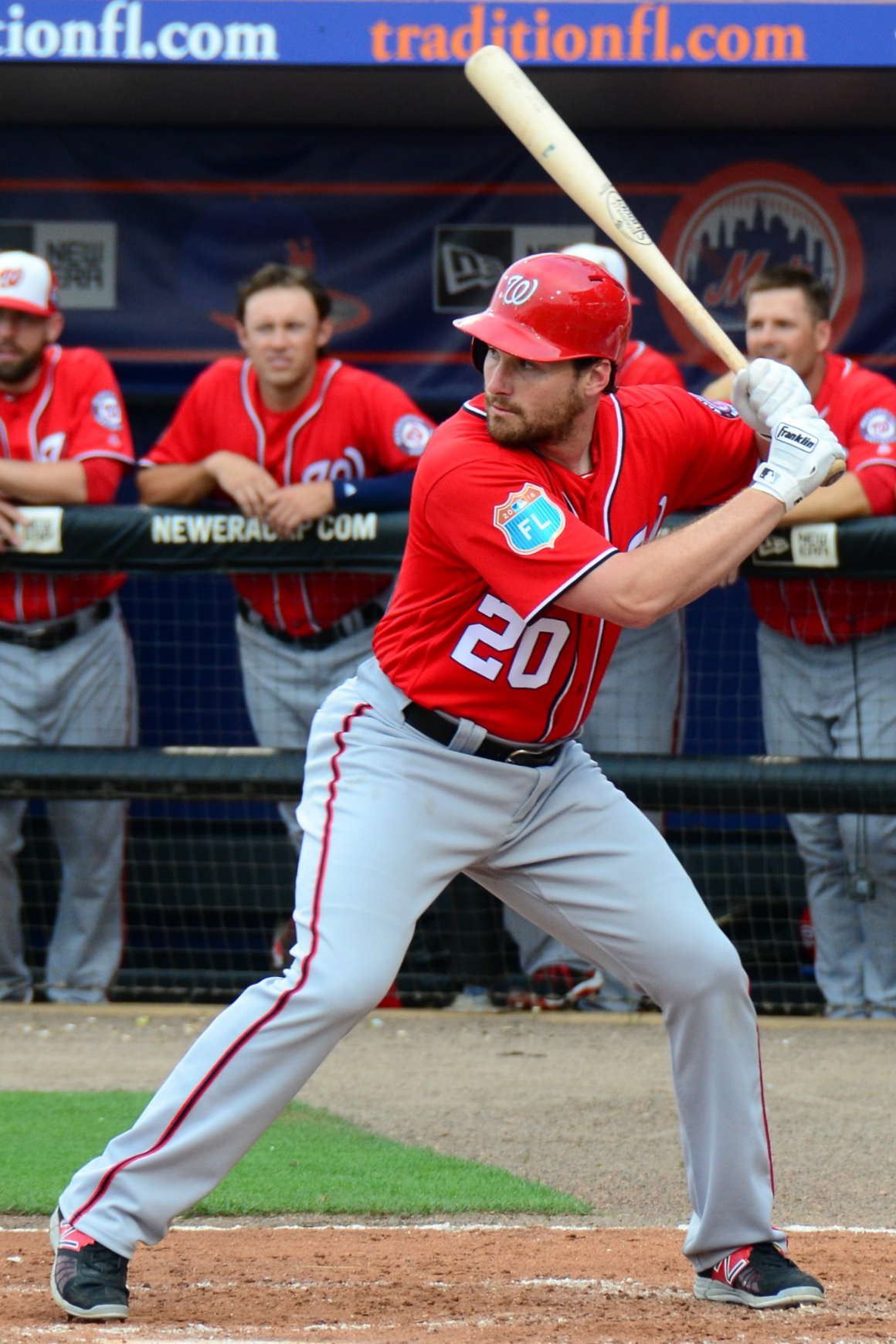
Murphy batting for the Washington Nationals in 2016 spring training

=== Washington Nationals (2016–2018) ===
On December 24, 2015, Murphy agreed to a three-year, $37.5 million contract with the Washington Nationals. The Mets gained a draft pick from the Nationals since Murphy turned down New York's qualifying offer. The Mets also got a compensation pick between the first and second rounds.

On May 2, 2016, Murphy recorded his 1,000th career hit in a game against the Kansas City Royals. On June 5, Murphy was selected to his second All-Star Game. He was nearly voted a starter by fans, losing to the Cubs' Ben Zobrist by just 88 votes. In 142 games, Murphy finished the year with a .347 batting average, 25 home runs, and 104 RBI. He led the NL in doubles (47), slugging percentage (.595), and on-base plus slugging (OPS) percentage (.985). He won his first Silver Slugger Award, being named the best offensive National League second baseman of 2016. He finished second in the NL MVP voting behind Kris Bryant. On September 20, Murphy was the last batter that Miami Marlins pitcher José Fernández faced in the major leagues. Fernández died in a boating accident five days later.

The following year, Murphy was voted in as a starter in his third All-Star Game. In 144 games, he finished the year with a .322 batting average, 23 home runs, and 93 RBI, despite battling a knee injury for at least part of the season. His batting average was best among National League second basemen and second-best in the National League overall, and his .928 on-base plus slugging (OPS) percentage was the best by a NL second basemen and more than 130 points higher than the next-best OPS among them. He won his second consecutive Silver Slugger Award as an NL second baseman.

Murphy underwent microfracture surgery on his knee in the offseason, and began the 2018 season on the 60-day disabled list. On June 12, 2018, he was activated off of the DL.

=== Chicago Cubs ===
On August 21, 2018, Murphy was traded to the Chicago Cubs in exchange for minor league infielder Andruw Monasterio and either a player to be named later or cash. In 35 games for the Cubs, Murphy batted .297/.329/.471 with 6 home runs and 13 RBI.

=== Colorado Rockies ===
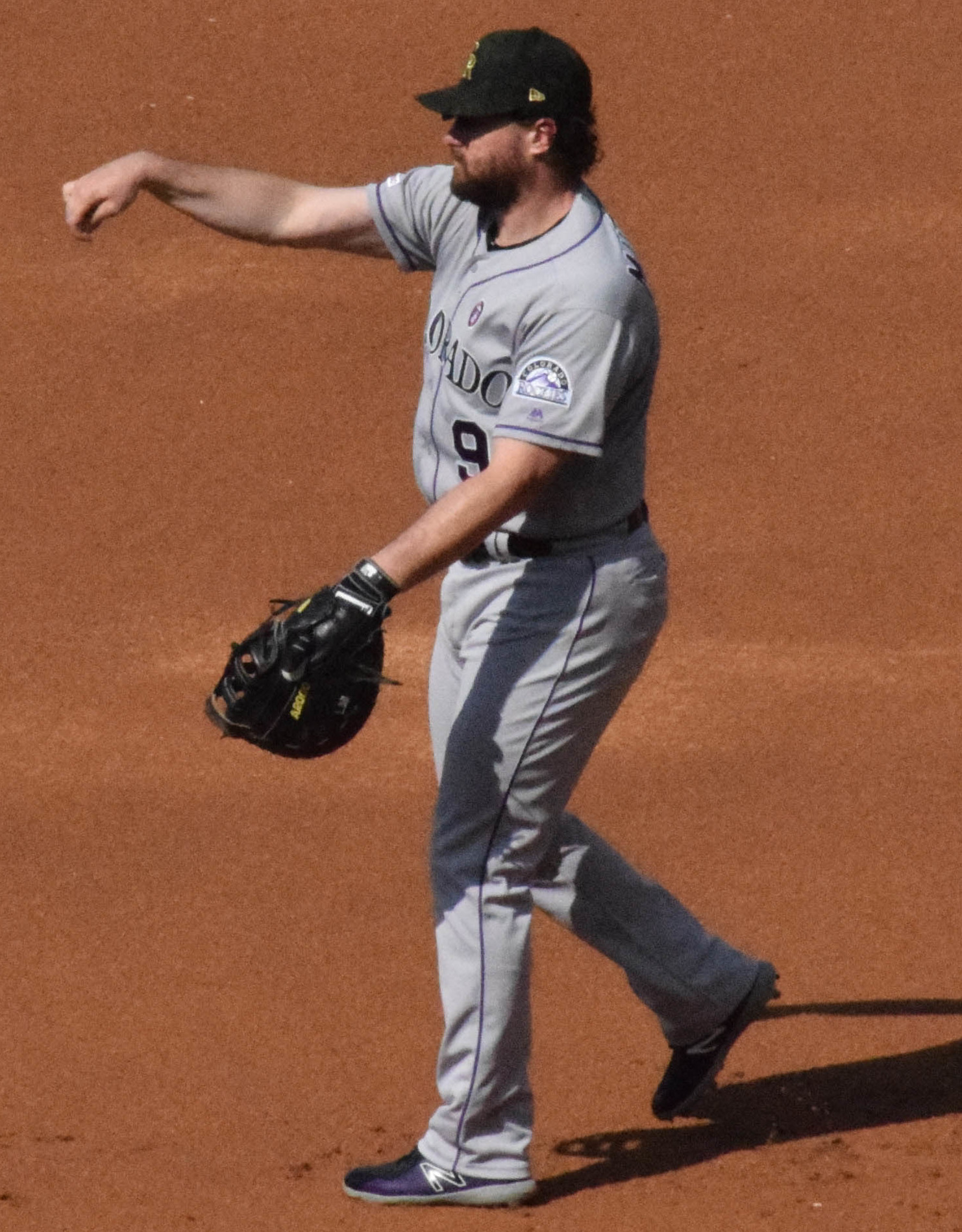
Murphy with the Rockies in 2019

On December 21, 2018, Murphy signed a two-year, $24 million contract with the Colorado Rockies with a $12 million option for the 2021 season. In 2019, he batted .279/.328/.452.

On October 28, 2020, Murphy became a free agent following the 2020 season. There was no official word whether Murphy or the Rockies declined to exercise his mutual option for the following season. He received a $6 million buyout and ended his Rockies career with a batting line of .269/.316/.426.

On January 29, 2021, Murphy announced his retirement at the age of 35.

=== Long Island Ducks ===
On March 29, 2023, Murphy came out of retirement and signed with the Long Island Ducks of the Atlantic League of Professional Baseball. In 37 games for the Ducks, Murphy batted .331/.410/.451 with 2 home runs and 19 RBI.

=== Los Angeles Angels ===
On June 12, 2023, Murphy signed a minor league contract with the Los Angeles Angels. He played for the Salt Lake Bees, appearing in 38 games and batting .295/.379/.362 with one home run and 25 RBI. On August 15, Murphy again retired from professional baseball.

== Broadcasting ==
Murphy signed on to announce some Mets games, backing up regular announcers, during 2024 spring training. He was also part of the SNY broadcast booth for two games in the 2024 season.

== Personal life ==
Daniel's younger brother, Jonathan, also played college baseball at Jacksonville University as an outfielder and was selected in the 19th round (580th overall) of the 2012 Major League Baseball draft by the Minnesota Twins. In August 2014, the Twins organization released Jonathan from the Cedar Rapids Kernels.

Murphy married his longtime girlfriend, Victoria "Tori" Ahern, on December 1, 2012, in Florida. The couple has two sons and a daughter.

When Murphy took a three-day leave of absence from the team to attend the birth of his child, he received heavy criticism from New York City radio commentators Boomer Esiason and Craig Carton on their show for doing so. While they were roundly criticized for their comments, including a statement by Mets manager Terry Collins where he told them to "look in the mirror," Murphy himself said only that he was aware of the comments.

In 2011, Murphy and fellow major leaguers Shane Victorino and Clay Buchholz appeared on a special Veterans Day episode of the ABC television series Extreme Makeover: Home Edition.

On June 9, 2014, Murphy was invited to speak at the Working Families Summit at the White House.

In March 2015, Major League Ambassador for Inclusion Billy Bean visited the Mets spring training clubhouse. Murphy, a devout Christian, made controversial comments when he remarked on Bean, who is gay: "I do disagree with the fact that Billy is a homosexual. That doesn't mean I can't still invest in him and get to know him" and "You can still accept them but I do disagree with the lifestyle, 100%." The next day Bean responded in an article on MLB.com, "I appreciate that Daniel spoke his truth. I really do. I was visiting his team, and a reporter asked his opinion about me. He was brave to share his feelings, and it made me want to work harder and be a better example that someday might allow him to view things from my perspective, if only for just a moment." Murphy announced the same day he would no longer talk to the media about his religious beliefs, and said he would "stick to baseball."

Preceded by Anderson Hernández	Mets Organizational Player of the Year (with Nick Evans); 2009	Succeeded by Ike Davis
