= Robinson Cancel =

Puerto Rican baseball player (born 1976)

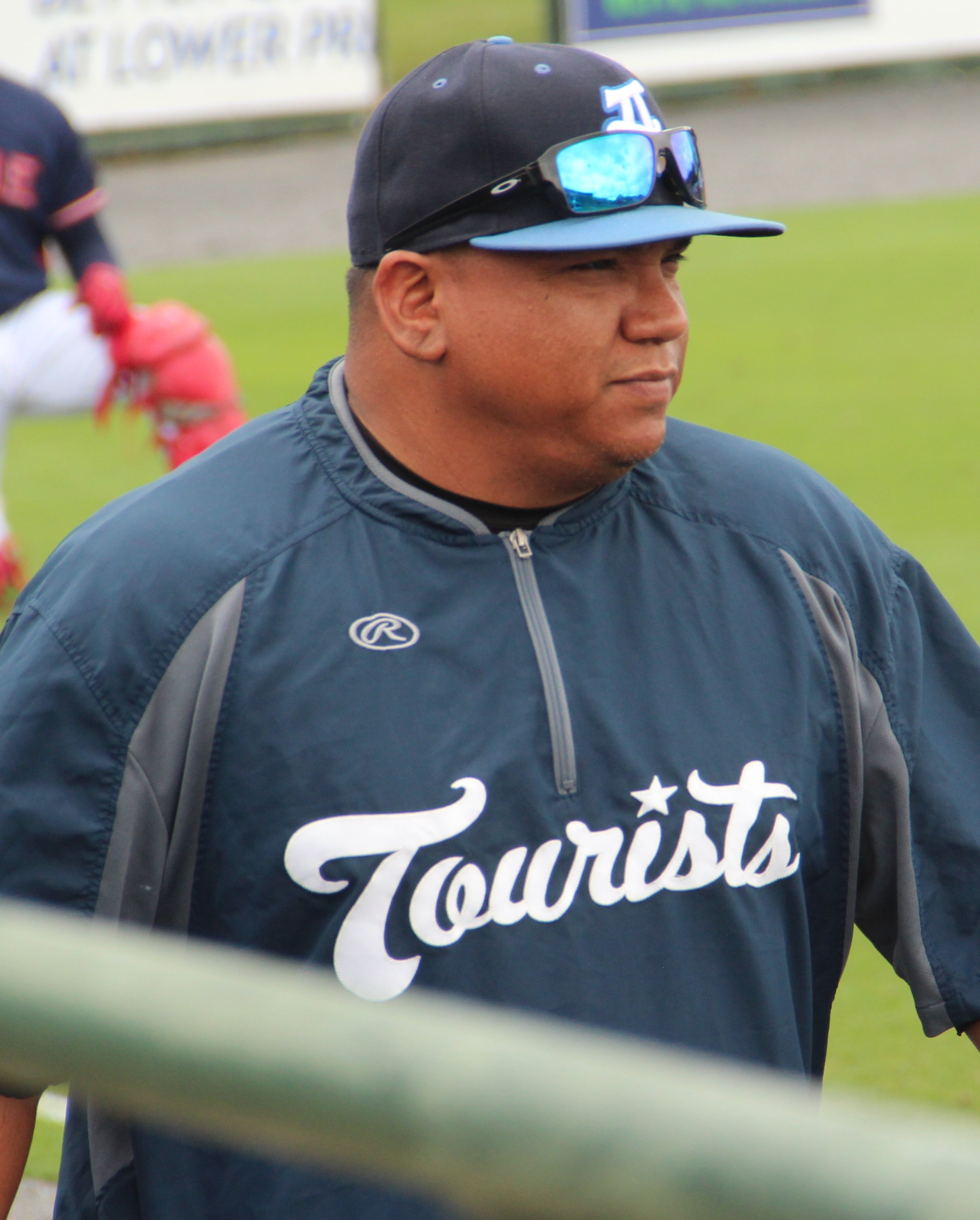
- Cancel with the Asheville Tourists in 2018
- Catcher
- Born: May 4, 1976 (age 50); Mayagüez, Puerto Rico
- Batted: Right Threw: Right

MLB debut
- September 3, 1999, for the Milwaukee Brewers

Last MLB appearance
- June 5, 2011, for the Houston Astros

MLB statistics
- Batting average: .200
- Home runs: 1
- Runs batted in: 10
- Stats at Baseball Reference

Teams
- Milwaukee Brewers (1999); New York Mets (2008–2009); Houston Astros (2011)

Robinson Cancel Castro (born May 4, 1976) is a Puerto Rican former professional baseball catcher. He played in Major League Baseball (MLB) from 1999 to 2011 for the Milwaukee Brewers, New York Mets, and Houston Astros.

== Early life ==
Cancel was born on May 4, 1976, in Mayagüez, Puerto Rico. He grew up in nearby Lajas, attending Leonides Morales Rodriguez High School.

== Playing career ==
Cancel made his Major League Baseball debut for the Milwaukee Brewers on September 3, 1999. He would not appear at the major league level again until June 4, 2008, when he was called up by the New York Mets.

On June 15, 2008, Cancel pinch-hit for Pedro Martínez in the bottom of the sixth inning with the bases loaded. Cancel singled to center field, driving in two runs; this single was the game-winning hit, giving Martínez his 211th career win. It was Cancel's first hit in the majors since 1999.

Cancel hit his first career home run as a member of the Mets on August 11, 2008, against Zach Duke of the Pittsburgh Pirates, coming almost nine years after Cancel's Major-League debut with the Brewers. He began the 2009 season in the minors, and was called up on July 30.

Cancel spent the 2010 season with the Long Island Ducks of the Atlantic League of Professional Baseball until the Houston Astros signed him in March 2011. On May 28, 2011, Cancel was called up after Humberto Quintero was placed on the 15-day disabled list with a high right ankle sprain.

== Coaching career ==
Cancel retired in 2013. The Atlanta Braves hired Cancel to manage the Gulf Coast League Braves club for 2015 season. Cancel later served as the manager of the Spokane Indians minor league baseball team.

In 2026, Cancel was promoted to be the manager of the Hartford Yard Goats, the Double-A affiliate of the Colorado Rockies.

== See also ==
- List of Major League Baseball players from Puerto Rico
