= Carlos Muñiz =

American baseball player (born 1981)

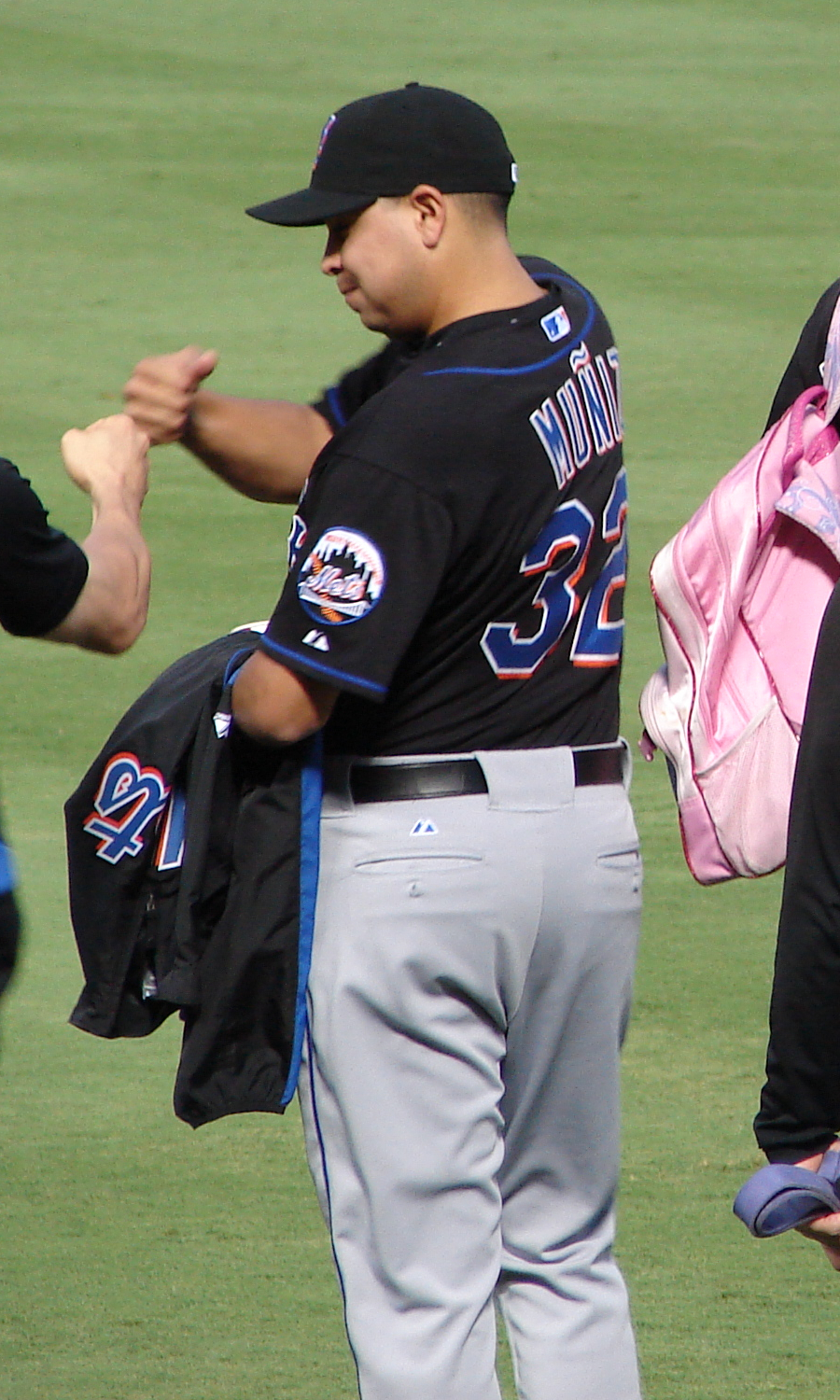
- Muñiz in 2008
- Pitcher
- Born: March 12, 1981 (age 45); Torrance, California, U.S.
- Batted: Right Threw: Right

MLB debut
- September 25, 2007, for the New York Mets

Last MLB appearance
- August 10, 2008, for the New York Mets

MLB statistics
- Win–loss record: 1–1
- Earned run average: 5.61
- Strikeouts: 18
- Stats at Baseball Reference

Teams
- New York Mets (2007–2008)

Carlos Javier Muñiz (born March 12, 1981) is an American former Major League Baseball relief pitcher.

Muñiz made his major league debut on September 25, 2007. He threw 1.1 innings and gave up 2 earned runs.

Muñiz was called up to the Mets on May 27, 2008, to replace injured pitcher Matt Wise in the bullpen. He was then sent back down to the New Orleans Zephyrs, which was the Mets Triple-A affiliate prior to 2009. He was then recalled on June 25 when Claudio Vargas was designated for assignment.
