= 2011 New York Mets season =

2011 New York Mets
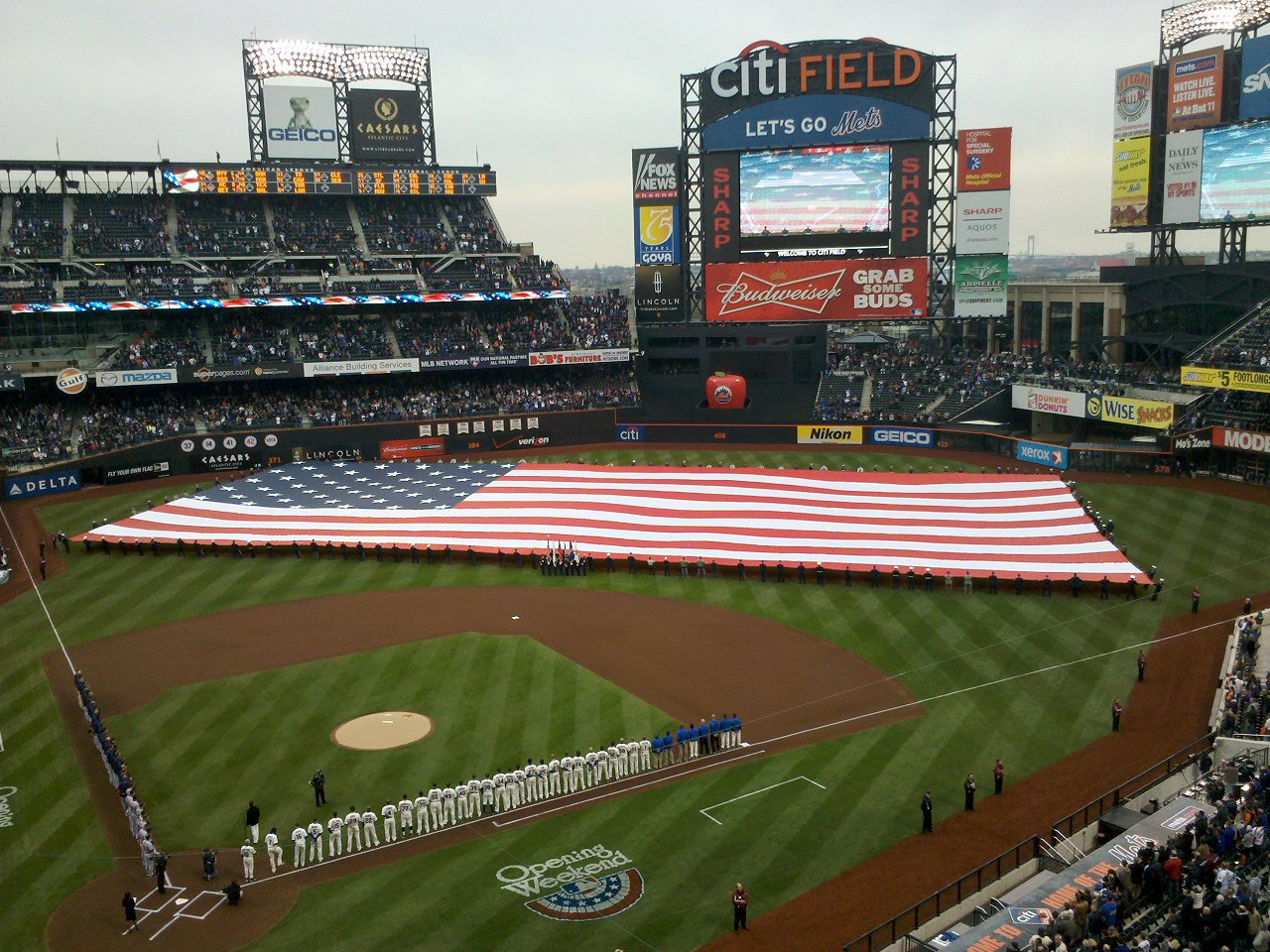
- Citi Field on Opening Day in 2011
- League: National League
- Division: East
- Ballpark: Citi Field
- City: New York, New York
- Record: 77–85 (.475)
- Divisional place: 4th
- Owners: Fred Wilpon
- General manager: Sandy Alderson
- Manager: Terry Collins
- Television: SportsNet New York; WPIX (CW affiliate)
- Radio: WFAN (English); WQBU-FM (Spanish)

The 2011 New York Mets season was the franchise's 50th season and its third at Citi Field. Following a poor 2010 season, the Mets sought their first postseason appearance since 2006. However, they failed to make the playoffs for the fifth straight season. The Mets finished with a record of 77–85 and fourth place in the National League East.

== Offseason ==
On October 4, 2010, one day after the conclusion of the 2010 season, the Mets fired Manager Jerry Manuel, along with general manager Omar Minaya. On October 29, the team hired former Oakland Athletics, San Diego Padres and MLB executive Sandy Alderson to replace Minaya as general manager. On November 23, Terry Collins was hired as manager.

In December 2010, Mets owner Fred Wilpon was named in a lawsuit filed on behalf of the victims of Bernie Madoff's Ponzi scheme, and on January 28, 2011, Wilpon issued a statement in which he intends to seek "one or more strategic partners" to buy a 20 to 25% interest in the Mets to offset pending losses due to litigation. As a result, the Mets were unable to sign any high priced free agents as they did during the Minaya era.

In March 2011, the Mets released Luis Castillo and Óliver Pérez from the team. The two players became the target of the fans' wrath in the previous two seasons due to their poor performance on the field.

== Regular season ==
The team began the season with high-priced stars Johan Santana and Jason Bay on the disabled list. Santana never played for the Mets in 2011, while Bay returned on April 21.

After seeing limited action in spring training following a 2010 knee injury, Carlos Beltrán started on Opening Day and played the full game.

The initial five-man rotation consisted of, in order, Mike Pelfrey, Jon Niese, R. A. Dickey, Chris Young and Chris Capuano.

The Mets started 2011 with a 3-1 record but, after losing consecutive doubleheaders on April 14 and 16, their record was 4-11, tying for third-worst in Mets history. Only the 1962 and 1964 Mets were worse after 15 games. The seven-game losing streak was the longest since 2004 and the consecutive doubleheader losses were the first since 1982. However, the Mets went 7–5 to close out the month of April, with the return of Jason Bay and offensive power.

The Mets began the month of May with a memorable 2–1, 14-inning win over the division rival Philadelphia Phillies at Citizens Bank Park on May 1. The Mets' Daniel Murphy was batting as a pinch-hitter against Phillies' reliever Ryan Madson when the fans started chanting "U-S-A!" in response to the news that Osama bin Laden, the mastermind of the September 11 attacks, had been killed by US Special Forces in Abbottabad, Pakistan. After the Mets won the game, Terry Collins said that catcher Ronny Paulino's game-winning RBI double in his Mets debut delivered "a good win for us, and obviously a huge win for America tonight." This win also conjured up parallels to their 3–2 win over the Atlanta Braves on September 21, 2001 in the first major professional sporting event held in New York City since the attacks. Appropriately, the Mets also hosted a Sunday night game on ESPN on September 11 to mark the tenth anniversary of the attacks.

Justin Turner contributed to the Mets' success in the month of May, becoming the first Met to be named the NL Rookie of the Month since the award's creation in 2001. On May 26, the Mets agreed to sell a portion of the team to hedge fund manager David Einhorn for $200 million, making him a minority owner of the team. The deal with Einhorn ultimately fell through.

On June 28 against the Detroit Tigers, Jason Bay and Carlos Beltrán both hit grand slams in a 14-3 rout. It marked only the second time in Mets history that the team hit two grand slams in the same game (the other time coming in 2006 when Beltran and Cliff Floyd connected in the same inning against the Chicago Cubs). It also broke a drought in which the Mets had not hit a grand slam in 299 team games, during which the Mets were out-grand slammed 18-0.

On July 12, the Mets dealt closer Francisco Rodríguez to the Milwaukee Brewers for cash, Adrian Rosario and Danny Herrera. On July 27, the Mets agreed to trade Carlos Beltrán to the San Francisco Giants for minor league pitching prospect Zack Wheeler.

On September 1, the Mets announced that they will not sell minority ownership of the team to Einhorn.

The pregame ceremonies on September 11, fittingly, featured members of the 2001 team. Singer Marc Anthony sang the national anthem, like he did on September 21, 2001. Throwing out the ceremonial first pitch was John Franco, the closer on their 2001 team to Mike Piazza, the catcher on their 2001 team.

José Reyes became the first player in Mets history to win the National League batting title by hitting .337.

=== Season standings ===
==== National League East ====
NL East
Team	W	L	Pct.	GB	Home	Road
Philadelphia Phillies	102	60	.630	—	52‍–‍29	50‍–‍31
Atlanta Braves	89	73	.549	13	47‍–‍34	42‍–‍39
Washington Nationals	80	81	.497	21½	44‍–‍36	36‍–‍45
New York Mets	77	85	.475	25	34‍–‍47	43‍–‍38
Florida Marlins	72	90	.444	30	31‍–‍47	41‍–‍43

==== National League Wild Card ====
Division leaders
Team	W	L	Pct.
Philadelphia Phillies	102	60	.630
Milwaukee Brewers	96	66	.593
Arizona Diamondbacks	94	68	.580

Wild Card team (Top team qualifies for postseason)
Team	W	L	Pct.	GB
St. Louis Cardinals	90	72	.556	—
Atlanta Braves	89	73	.549	1
San Francisco Giants	86	76	.531	4
Los Angeles Dodgers	82	79	.509	7½
Washington Nationals	80	81	.497	9½
Cincinnati Reds	79	83	.488	11
New York Mets	77	85	.475	13
Colorado Rockies	73	89	.451	17
Florida Marlins	72	90	.444	18
Pittsburgh Pirates	72	90	.444	18
Chicago Cubs	71	91	.438	19
San Diego Padres	71	91	.438	19
Houston Astros	56	106	.346	34

=== Record vs. opponents ===
2011 National League record Source: MLB Standings Grid – 2011
Team	AZ	ATL	CHC	CIN	COL	FLA	HOU	LAD	MIL	NYM	PHI	PIT	SD	SF	STL	WSH	AL
Arizona	–	2–3	3–4	4–2	13–5	5–2	6–1	10–8	4–3	3–3	3–3	3–3	11–7	9–9	3–4	5–3	10–8
Atlanta	3–2	–	4–3	3–3	6–2	12–6	5–1	2–5	5–3	9–9	6–12	4–2	4–5	6–1	1–5	9–9	10–5
Chicago	4–3	3–4	–	7–11	2–4	3–3	8–7	3–3	6–10	4–2	2–5	8–8	3–3	5–4	5–10	3–4	5–10
Cincinnati	2–4	3–3	11–7	–	3–4	3–3	9–6	4–2	8–8	2–5	1–7	5–10	4–2	5–2	9–6	4–2	6–12
Colorado	5–13	2–6	4–2	4–3	–	3–3	5–2	9–9	3–6	5–2	1–4	4–3	9–9	5–13	2–4	4–3	8–7
Florida	2–5	6–12	3–3	3–3	3–3	–	6–1	3–3	0–7	9–9	6–12	6–0	0–7	4–2	2–6	11–7	8–10
Houston	1–6	1–5	7–8	6–9	2–5	1–6	–	4–5	3–12	3–3	2–4	7–11	3–5	4–3	5–10	3–3	4–11
Los Angeles	8–10	5–2	3–3	2–4	9–9	3–3	5–4	–	2–4	2–5	1–5	6–2	13–5	9–9	4–3	4–2	6–9
Milwaukee	3–4	3–5	10–6	8–8	6–3	7–0	12–3	4–2	–	4–2	3–4	12–3	3–2	3–3	9–9	3–3	6–9
New York	3–3	9–9	2–4	5–2	2–5	9–9	3–3	5–2	2–4	–	7–11	4–4	4–3	2–4	3–3	8–10	9–9
Philadelphia	3–3	12–6	5–2	7–1	4–1	12–6	4–2	5–1	4–3	11–7	–	4–2	7–1	4–3	3–6	8–10	9–6
Pittsburgh	3–3	2–4	8–8	10–5	3–4	0–6	11–7	2–6	3–12	4–4	2–4	–	2–4	3–3	7–9	4–4	8–7
San Diego	7–11	5–4	3–3	2–4	9–9	7–0	5–3	5–13	2–3	3–4	1–7	4–2	–	6–12	3–3	3–4	6–9
San Francisco	9–9	1–6	4–5	2–5	13–5	2–4	3–4	9–9	3–3	4–2	3–4	3–3	12–6	–	5–2	3–4	10–5
St. Louis	4–3	5–1	10–5	6–9	4–2	6–2	10–5	3–4	9–9	3–3	6–3	9–7	3–3	2–5	–	2–4	8–7
Washington	3–5	9–9	4–3	2–4	3–4	7–11	3–3	2–4	3–3	10–8	10–8	4–4	4–3	4–3	4–2	–	8–7

=== Game log ===
Legend
Mets Win	Mets Loss	Game postponed

2011 Game Log
April (11–16)

#	Date	Opponent	Score	Win	Loss	Save	Attendance	Record	Report
1	April 1	@ Marlins	2–6	Johnson (1–0)	Pelfrey (0–1)		41,237	0–1	Boxscore
2	April 2	@ Marlins	6–4 (10)	Rodríguez (1–0)	Webb (0–1)	Boyer (1)	32,495	1–1	Boxscore
3	April 3	@ Marlins	9–2	Dickey (1–0)	Vázquez (0–1)		18,936	2–1	Boxscore
4	April 5	@ Phillies	7–1	Young (1–0)	Hamels (0–1)		45,365	3–1	Boxscore
5	April 6	@ Phillies	7–10	Bastardo (1–0)	Boyer (0–1)	Contreras (1)	45,061	3–2	Boxscore
6	April 7	@ Phillies	0–11	Halladay (1–0)	Niese (0–1)		45,468	3–3	Boxscore
7	April 8	Nationals	2–6	Zimmermann (1–1)	Dickey (1–1)		41,075	3–4	Boxscore
8	April 9	Nationals	8–4	Capuano (1–0)	Gorzelanny (0–1)	Rodríguez (1)	31,696	4–4	Boxscore
9	April 10	Nationals	3–7 (11)	Storen (1–1)	Boyer (0–2)		35,157	4–5	Boxscore
10	April 11	Rockies	6–7	Belisle (2–0)	Parnell (0–1)	Street (5)	24,865	4–6	Boxscore
--	April 12	Rockies	Game Postponed (rain) (to be made up as a doubleheader on 4/14)						
11	April 13	Rockies	4–5	Rogers (2–0)	Niese (0–2)	Street (6)	25,878	4–7	Boxscore
12	April 14	Rockies	5–6	Reynolds (1–0)	Dickey (1–2)	Lindstrom (2)		4–8	Boxscore
13	April 14	Rockies	4–9	de la Rosa (2–0)	Capuano (1–1)		25,758	4–9	Boxscore
--	April 15	@ Braves	Game Postponed (rain) (to be made up as a doubleheader on 4/16)						
14	April 16	@ Braves	2–4	Lowe (2–2)	Carrasco (0–1)	Kimbrel (4)		4–10	Boxscore
15	April 16	@ Braves	0–4	Jurrjens (1–1)	Pelfrey (0–2)		31,383	4–11	Boxscore
16	April 17	@ Braves	3–2	Gee (1–0)	Hanson (1–2)	Rodríguez (2)	29,625	5–11	Boxscore
17	April 19	Astros	1–6	Rodríguez (1–2)	Niese (0–3)		27,032	5–12	Boxscore
18	April 20	Astros	3–4	Melancon (2–1)	Dickey (1–3)	Lyon (4)	27,380	5–13	Boxscore
19	April 21	Astros	9–1	Capuano (2–1)	Happ (1–3)		32,819	6–13	Boxscore
20	April 22	Diamondbacks	4–1	Pelfrey (1–2)	Vásquez (0–1)	Rodríguez (3)	26,546	7–13	Boxscore
21	April 23	Diamondbacks	6–4	Gee (2–0)	Enright (0–2)	Rodríguez (4)	25,581	8–13	Boxscore
22	April 24	Diamondbacks	8–4	Niese (1–3)	Galarraga (3–1)		22,232	9–13	Boxscore
23	April 26	@ Nationals	6–4	Igarashi (1–0)	Zimmermann (1–4)	Rodríguez (5)	14,603	10–13	Boxscore
24	April 27	@ Nationals	6–3	Beato (1–0)	Burnett (0–1)	Rodríguez (6)	13,568	11–13	Boxscore
25	April 28	@ Nationals	3–4	Hernández (3–2)	Capuano (2–2)	Storen (4)	15,142	11–14	Boxscore
26	April 29	@ Phillies	3–10	Worley (1–0)	Pelfrey (1–3)		45,613	11–15	Boxscore
27	April 30	@ Phillies	1–2	Halladay (4–1)	Niese (1–4)		45,598	11–16	Boxscore

May (14–13)

#	Date	Opponent	Score	Win	Loss	Save	Attendance	Record	Report
28	May 1	@ Phillies	2–1 (14)	Buchholz (1–0)	Kendrick (1–2)		45,713	12–16	Boxscore
29	May 3	Giants	6–7 (10)	Lopez (1–0)	Buchholz (1–1)	Wilson (9)	32,288	12–17	Boxscore
30	May 4	Giants	0–2	Lincecum (3–3)	Capuano (2–3)	Wilson (10)	29,333	12–18	Boxscore
31	May 5	Giants	5–2	Pelfrey (2–3)	Sánchez (2–2)	Rodríguez (7)	23,433	13–18	Boxscore
32	May 6	Dodgers	6–3	Igarashi (2–0)	Kuroda (3–3)	Rodríguez (8)	35,948	14–18	Boxscore
33	May 7	Dodgers	4–2	Byrdak (1–0)	MacDougal (0–1)	Rodríguez (9)	31,464	15–18	Boxscore
34	May 8	Dodgers	2–4	Kershaw (4–3)	Dickey (1–4)	Padilla (2)	26,312	15–19	Boxscore
35	May 9	@ Rockies	1–2	Belisle (3–2)	Capuano (2–4)	Street (12)	31,885	15–20	Boxscore
36	May 10	@ Rockies	4–3	Pelfrey (3–3)	Hammel (3–2)	Rodríguez (10)	31,007	16–20	Boxscore
–	May 11	@ Rockies	Postponed (rain) Rescheduled for May 12						
37	May 12	@ Rockies	9–5	Niese (2–4)	Jiménez (0–3)		21,422	17–20	Boxscore
38	May 13	@ Astros	6–4	Misch (1–0)	Fulchino (0–1)	Rodríguez (11)	28,791	18–20	Boxscore
39	May 14	@ Astros	3–7	Happ (3–4)	Dickey (1–5)		31,140	18–21	Boxscore
40	May 15	@ Astros	7–4	Capuano (3–4)	Rodríguez (0–2)	Rodríguez (12)	28,406	19–21	Boxscore
41	May 16	Marlins	1–2 (11)	Badenhop(1–0)	Igarashi(2–1)	Núñez (15)	23,721	19–22	Boxscore
–	May 17	Marlins	Postponed (rain) Rescheduled for July 18						
42	May 18	Nationals	3–0	Niese (3–4)	Gorzelanny(2–3)	Rodríguez (13)	24,527	20–22	Boxscore
43	May 19	Nationals	1–0	Gee (3–0)	Hernández (3–6)	Rodríguez (14)	26,835	21–22	Boxscore
44	May 20	@ Yankees	2–1	Dickey (2–5)	García (2–4)	Rodríguez (15)	47,874	22–22	Boxscore
45	May 21	@ Yankees	3–7	Burnett (5–3)	Capuano (3–5)		48,286	22–23	Boxscore
46	May 22	@ Yankees	3–9	Ayala (1–0)	Pelfrey (3–4)		48,293	22–24	Boxscore
47	May 24	@ Cubs	1–11	Dempster (3–4)	Niese (3–5)		35,707	22–25	Boxscore
48	May 25	@ Cubs	7–4 (7)	Gee (4–0)	Coleman (2–4)		36,666	23–25	Boxscore
49	May 26	@ Cubs	3–9	Zambrano (5–2)	Beato (1–1)		33,378	23–26	Boxscore
50	May 27	Phillies	4–6	Bastardo (3–0)	Rodríguez (1–1)	Madson (10)	33,882	23–27	Boxscore
51	May 28	Phillies	2–5	Hamels (7–2)	O'Connor (0–1)	Madson (11)	29,337	23–28	Boxscore
52	May 29	Phillies	9–5	Niese (4–5)	Worley (2–1)		30,791	24–28	Boxscore
53	May 30	Pirates	7–3	Gee (5–0)	McCutchen (1–1)		24,490	25–28	Boxscore
54	May 31	Pirates	1–5	Meek (1–1)	Dickey (2–6)		26,198	25–29	Boxscore

June (16–11)

#	Date	Opponent	Score	Win	Loss	Save	Attendance	Record	Report
55	June 1	Pirates	3–9	Correia (8–4)	Capuano (3–6)		25,234	25–30	Boxscore
56	June 2	Pirates	9–8	Isringhausen (1–0)	Veras (1–2)	Rodríguez (16)	30,074	26–30	Boxscore
57	June 3	Braves	3–6	Venters (4–0)	Rodríguez (1–2)	Kimbrel (17)	28,301	26–31	Boxscore
58	June 4	Braves	5–0	Gee (6–0)	Jurrjens (7–2)		28,114	27–31	Boxscore
59	June 5	Braves	6–4	Dickey (3–6)	Hudson (4–5)		21,015	28–31	Boxscore
60	June 7	@ Brewers	2–1	Capuano (4–6)	Estrada (1–2)	Rodríguez (17)	27,064	29–31	Boxscore
61	June 8	@ Brewers	6–7	Axford (2–1)	Thayer (0–1)		26,144	29–32	Boxscore
62	June 9	@ Brewers	4–1	Niese (5–5)	Gallardo (8–3)	Rodríguez (18)	30,632	30–32	Boxscore
63	June 10	@ Pirates	8–1	Gee (7–0)	Morton (6–3)		24,653	31–32	Boxscore
64	June 11	@ Pirates	2–3	McDonald (4–4)	Dickey (3–7)	Hanrahan (16)	39,273	31–33	Boxscore
65	June 12	@ Pirates	7–0	Capuano (5–6)	Correia (8–5)		26,452	32–33	Boxscore
66	June 13	@ Pirates	1–3	Malholm (3–7)	Pelfrey (3–5)	Hanrahan (17)	15,555	32–34	Boxscore
67	June 14	@ Braves	4–3	Niese (6–5)	Jurrjens (8–3)	Rodríguez (19)	32,161	33–34	Boxscore
68	June 15	@ Braves	4–0	Parnell (1–1)	Hudson (5–6)		31,161	34–34	Boxscore
69	June 16	@ Braves	8–9 (10)	Linebrink (3–1)	Carrasco (0–2)		26,077	34–35	Boxscore
70	June 17	Angels	3–4	Piñeiro (3–3)	Capuano (5–7)	Walden (16)	29,513	34–36	Boxscore
71	June 18	Angels	6–1	Pelfrey (4–5)	Haren (6–5)		31,538	35–36	Boxscore
72	June 19	Angels	3–7	Chatwood (4–4)	Niese (6–6)		36,213	35–37	Boxscore
73	June 21	Athletics	3–7	Outman (3–1)	Gee (7–1)	Balfour (2)	37,019	35–38	Boxscore
74	June 22	Athletics	3–2 (13)	Parnell (2–1)	Ziegler (2–1)		38,813	36–38	Boxscore
75	June 23	Athletics	4–1	Capuano (6–7)	Godfrey (1–1)	Rodríguez (20)	30,168	37–38	Boxscore
76	June 24	@ Rangers	1–8	Harrison (6–6)	Pelfrey (4–6)		46,092	37–39	Boxscore
77	June 25	@ Rangers	14–5	Niese (7–6)	Ogando (7–3)		37,292	38–39	Boxscore
78	June 26	@ Rangers	8–5	Gee (8–1)	Holland (6–3)		37,879	39–39	Boxscore
79	June 28	@ Tigers	14–3	Dickey (4–7)	Porcello (6–6)		28,480	40–39	Boxscore
80	June 29	@ Tigers	16–9	Capuano (7–7)	Coke (1–8)		26,338	41–39	Boxscore
81	June 30	@ Tigers	2–5	Verlander (11–3)	Pelfrey (4–7)	Valverde (19)	31,861	41–40	Boxscore

July (14–13)

#	Date	Opponent	Score	Win	Loss	Save	Attendance	Record	Report
82	July 1	Yankees	1–5	Nova (8–4)	Niese (7–7)		42,020	41–41	Boxscore
83	July 2	Yankees	2–5	Colón (6–3)	Gee (8–2)		42,042	41–42	Boxscore
84	July 3	Yankees	3–2 (10)	Rodríguez (2–2)	Ayala (1–2)		41,513	42–42	Boxscore
85	July 4	@ Dodgers	5–2	Capuano (8–7)	De La Rosa (3–4)	Rodríguez (21)	56,000	43–42	Boxscore
86	July 5	@ Dodgers	6–0	Pelfrey (5–7)	Lilly (5–9)		32,329	44–42	Boxscore
87	July 6	@ Dodgers	5–3	Niese (8–7)	Kuroda (6–10)	Rodríguez (22)	31,005	45–42	Boxscore
88	July 7	@ Dodgers	0–6	Kershaw (9–4)	Gee (8–3)		56,000	45–43	Boxscore
89	July 8	@ Giants	5–2	Beato (2–1)	Wilson (6–2)	Rodríguez (23)	41,028	46–43	Boxscore
90	July 9	@ Giants	1–3	Lincecum (7–7)	Capuano (8–8)	Romo (1)	42,117	46–44	Boxscore
91	July 10	@ Giants	2–4	Cain (8–5)	Pelfrey (5–8)	Wilson (26)	42,123	46–45	Boxscore
92	July 15	Phillies	2–7	Worley (5–1)	Dickey (4–8)		37,304	46–46	Boxscore
93	July 16	Phillies	11–2	Niese (9–7)	Hamels (11–5)		41,166	47–46	Boxscore
94	July 17	Phillies	5–8	Kendrick (5–4)	Pelfrey (5–9)	Bastardo (6)	34,695	47–47	Boxscore
95	July 18	Marlins	1–4	Hensley (1–2)	Capuano (8–9)	Núñez (27)	32,411	47–48	Boxscore
96	July 19	Cardinals	4–2	Gee (9–3)	Lohse (8–7)	Isringhausen (1)	35,448	48–48	Boxscore
97	July 20	Cardinals	6–5 (10)	Isringhausen (2–0)	Salas(5–4)		30,770	49–48	Boxscore
98	July 21	Cardinals	2–6	Westbrook (8–4)	Niese (9–8)		37,416	49–49	Boxscore
99	July 22	@ Marlins	7–6	Parnell (3–1)	Mujica (8–3)	Isringhausen (2)	21,304	50–49	Boxscore
100	July 23	@ Marlins	5–8	Badenhop (2–1)	Capuano (8–10)		26,345	50–50	Boxscore
101	July 24	@ Marlins	2–5	Choate (1–1)	Parnell (3–2)	Núñez (28)	20,416	50–51	Boxscore
102	July 25	@ Reds	4–2	Dickey (5–8)	Leake (8–6)	Isringhausen (3)	25,480	51–51	Boxscore
103	July 26	@ Reds	8–6	Niese (9–8)	Cueto (6–4)	Byrdak (1)	27,552	52–51	Boxscore
104	July 27	@ Reds	8–2	Pelfrey (6–9)	Arroyo (7–9)		23,616	53–51	Boxscore
105	July 28	@ Reds	10–9	Capuano (9–10)	Bailey (5–5)	Isringhausen (4)	25,400	54–51	Boxscore
106	July 29	@ Nationals	8–5	Gee (10–3)	Wang (0–1)	Isringhausen (5)	30,114	55–51	Boxscore
107	July 30	@ Nationals	0–3	Maya (1–1)	Dickey (5–8)	Storen (26)	35,414	55–52	Boxscore
108	July 31	@ Nationals	2–3	Storen (6–2)	Parnell (3–3)		25,307	55–53	Boxscore

August (10–16)

#	Date	Opponent	Score	Win	Loss	Save	Attendance	Record	Report
109	August 1	Marlins	3–7 (10)	Núñez (1–2)	Isringhausen (2–1)		28,862	55–54	Boxscore
110	August 2	Marlins	3–4	Cishek (2–1)	Isringhausen (2–2)	Núñez (31)	33,297	55–55	Boxscore
—	August 3	Marlins	Game Postponed (rain) (to be made up on August 29 as part of a doubleheader)						
111	August 5	Braves	1–4	Hudson (11–7)	Dickey (5–10)	Kimbrel (33)	30,607	55–56	Boxscore
112	August 6	Braves	11–7	Niese (11–8)	Hanson (11–7)		33,556	56–56	Boxscore
113	August 7	Braves	5–6	Venters (6–1)	Parnell (3–4)	Kimbrel (34)	29,853	56–57	Boxscore
114	August 8	Padres	9–8	Isringhausen (3–2)	Bell (2–4)		21,814	57–57	Boxscore
115	August 9	Padres	5–4	Carrasco (1–2)	Qualls (5–6)	Isringhausen (6)	24,619	58–57	Boxscore
116	August 10	Padres	5–9	Harang (11–3)	Dickey (5–11)		39,589	58–58	Boxscore
117	August 11	Padres	2–3	Qualls (6–6)	Niese (11–9)	Bell (32)	32,348	58–59	Boxscore
118	August 12	@ Diamondbacks	3–4	Kennedy (15–3)	Gee (10–4)	Putz (28)	25,701	58–60	Boxscore
119	August 13	@ Diamondbacks	4–6	Hudson (12–8)	Carrasco (1–3)	Putz (29)	33,552	58–61	Boxscore
120	August 14	@ Diamondbacks	3–5	Duke (3–4)	Capuano (9–11)	Hernandez (11)	30,148	58–62	Boxscore
121	August 15	@ Padres	5–4 (10)	Acosta (1–0)	Spence (0–2)	Isringhausen (7)	30,094	59–62	Boxscore
122	August 16	@ Padres	1–6	Luebke (5–6)	Niese (11–10)		24,212	59–63	Boxscore
123	August 17	@ Padres	7–3	Gee (11–4)	Latos (6–12)		22,089	60–63	Boxscore
124	August 19	Brewers	1–6	Marcum (11–3)	Pelfrey (6–10)		24,470	60–64	Boxscore
125	August 20	Brewers	9–11	Rodríguez (5–2)	Isringhausen (3–3)	Axford (37)	28,234	60–65	Boxscore
126	August 21	Brewers	2–6	Gallardo (14–8)	Acosta (1–1)		25,949	60–66	Boxscore
127	August 22	@ Phillies	0–10	Lee (14–7)	Gee (11–5)		45,783	60–67	Boxscore
128	August 23	@ Phillies	4–9	Worley (9–1)	Niese (11–11)		45,770	60–68	Boxscore
129	August 24	@ Phillies	7–4	Pelfrey (7–10)	Kendrick (7–6)	Parnell (1)	45,689	61–68	Boxscore
130	August 26	Braves	6–0	Capuano (10–11)	Hudson (13–8)		22,736	62–68	Boxscore
—	August 27	Braves	Games Postponed (Hurricane Irene) (to be made up on September 8 as a doubleheader)						
—	August 28	Braves	Games Postponed (Hurricane Irene) (to be made up on September 8 as a doubleheader)						
131	August 29	Marlins	2–1	Dickey (6–11)	Sánchez (7–7)	Parnell (2)		63–68	Boxscore
132	August 29	Marlins	5–1	Gee (12–5)	Nolasco (9–10)		29,335	64–68	Boxscore
133	August 30	Marlins	0–6	Vázquez (8–11)	Pelfrey (7–11)		30,806	64–69	Boxscore
134	August 31	Marlins	3–2	Acosta (2–1)	Volstad (5–12)	Parnell (3)	27,905	65–69	Boxscore

September (9–13)

#	Date	Opponent	Score	Win	Loss	Save	Attendance	Record	Report
135	September 1	Marlins	7–5	Batista (4–2)	Hensley (2–6)	Parnell (4)	27,562	66–69	Boxscore
136	September 2	@ Nationals	7–3	Dickey (7–11)	Detwiler (2–5)		27,907	67–69	Boxscore
137	September 3	@ Nationals	7–8	Burnett (5–5)	Parnell (3–5)		34,821	67–70	Boxscore
138	September 4	@ Nationals	6–3	Igarashi (3–1)	Hernández (8–13)	Parnell (5)	29,679	68–70	Boxscore
139	September 5	@ Marlins	3–9	Vázquez (9–11)	Capuano (10–12)		21,112	68–71	Boxscore
140	September 6	@ Marlins	7–4 (12)	Igarashi (4–1)	Ceda (0–1)	Stinson (1)	22,318	69–71	Boxscore
141	September 7	@ Marlins	1–0	Dickey (8–11)	Hand (1–6)	Acosta (1)	21,303	70–71	Boxscore
142	September 8	Braves	5–6	Minor (5–2)	Schwinden(0–1)	Kimbrel (43)	25,953	70–72	Boxscore
143	September 8	Braves	1–5	Teherán (1–1)	Gee (12–6)		25,953	70–73	Boxscore
144	September 9	Cubs	5–4	Acosta (3–1)	Marshall (6–6)		27,639	71–73	Boxscore
145	September 10	Cubs	4–5	Wood (3–5)	Parnell (3–6)	Mármol (34)	30,443	71–74	Boxscore
146	September 11	Cubs	6–10	Ortiz (1–2)	Stinson (0–1)		33,502	71–75	Boxscore
147	September 12	Nationals	2–3	Coffey (5–1)	Dickey (8–12)	Storen (35)	27,015	71–76	Boxscore
148	September 13	Nationals	2–3	Stammen (1–1)	Thayer (0–2)	Storen (36)	25,359	71–77	Boxscore
149	September 14	Nationals	0–2	Peacock	Pelfrey (7–12)	Storen (37)	26,885	71–78	Boxscore
150	September 15	Nationals	1–10	Milone (1–0)	Schwinden (0–2)		22,205	71–79	Boxscore
151	September 16	@ Braves	12–2	Capuano (11–12)	Lowe (9–15)		43,901	72–79	Boxscore
152	September 17	@ Braves	0–1	Hudson (15–10)	Dickey (8–13)	Kimbrel (45)	46,763	72–80	Boxscore
153	September 18	@ Braves	7–5	Byrdak (2–0)	Venters (6–2)	Acosta (2)	39,862	73–80	Boxscore
154	September 20	@ Cardinals	6–11	Dotel (4–3)	Stinson (0–2)		37,746	73–81	Boxscore
155	September 21	@ Cardinals	5–6	Garcia (13–7)	Herrera (0–1)	Motte (8)	40,658	73–82	Boxscore
156	September 22	@ Cardinals	8–6	Acosta (4–1)	Rzepczynski (2–6)	Parnell (6)	35,992	74–82	Boxscore
157	September 23	Phillies	Game Postponed (rain) rescheduled for September 24						
157	September 24	Phillies	6–3	Gee (13–6)	Herndon (1–4)	Acosta (4)	32,437	75–82	
158	September 24	Phillies	2–1	Parnell (4–6)	Lidge (0–2)	Acosta (5)	33,961	76–82	
159	September 25	Phillies	4–9	Halladay (19–6)	Pelfrey (7–13)		32,796	76–83	
160	September 26	Reds	5–6	Ondrusek (5–5)	Byrdak (2–1)	Cordero (36)	28,651	76–84	
161	September 27	Reds	4–5	LeCure (2–1)	Thayer (0–3)	Cordero (37)	30,027	76–85	
162	September 28	Reds	3–0	Batista (5–2)	Volquez (5–7)		28,816	77–85	

=== Roster ===
2011 New York Mets
Roster
Pitchers: 36,46 Manny Acosta; 47 Miguel Batista; 27 Pedro Beato; 23 Blaine Boyer; 33 Taylor Buchholz; 40 Tim Byrdak; 38 Chris Capuano; 77 D. J. Carrasco; 43 R. A. Dickey; 35 Dillon Gee; 19 Danny Herrera; 18 Ryota Igarashi; 45 Jason Isringhausen; 48 Patrick Misch; 49 Jon Niese; 50 Mike O'Connor; 39 Bobby Parnell; 34 Mike Pelfrey; 75 Francisco Rodríguez; 63 Chris Schwinden; 64 Josh Stinson; 46,36 Dale Thayer; 55 Chris Young	Catchers: 13 Mike Nickeas; 9 Ronny Paulino; 30 Josh Thole; Infielders: 29 Ike Davis; 21 Lucas Duda; 4 Brad Emaus; 6 Nick Evans; 25 Chin-lung Hu; 28 Daniel Murphy; 15 Valentino Pascucci; 7 José Reyes; 3 Josh Satin; 11 Rubén Tejada; 2 Justin Turner; 5 David Wright; Outfielders: 23 Mike Baxter; 44 Jason Bay; 15 Carlos Beltrán; 12 Scott Hairston; 22 Willie Harris; 26 Fernando Martínez; 16 Ángel Pagán; 20 Jason Pridie	Manager: 10 Terry Collins; Coaches: 56 Jon Debus (bullpen); 51 Chip Hale (third base); 52 Dave Hudgens (hitting); 58 Ken Oberkfell (bench); 78 Eric Langill (bullpen catcher); 54 Dave Racaniello (bullpen catcher); 59 Dan Warthen (pitching); 1 Mookie Wilson (first base)

== Player stats ==
=== Batting ===
Note: G = Games played; AB = At bats; R = Runs scored; H = Hits; 2B = Doubles; 3B = Triples; HR = Home Runs; RBI = Runs batted in; SB = Stolen bases; BB = Base on balls; AVG = Batting average;

Player	G	AB	R	H	2B	3B	HR	RBI	SB	BB	AVG
Mike Baxter	22	34	6	8	2	1	1	4	0	5	.235
Jason Bay	123	444	59	109	19	1	12	57	11	56	.245
Carlos Beltrán	98	353	61	102	30	2	15	66	3	60	.289
Lucas Duda	100	301	38	88	21	3	10	50	1	33	.292
Ike Davis	36	129	20	39	8	1	7	25	0	17	.302
Brad Emaus	14	37	2	6	0	0	0	1	0	4	.162
Nick Evans	59	176	26	45	10	2	4	25	0	15	.256
Scott Hairston	79	132	20	31	8	1	7	24	1	11	.235
Willie Harris	126	240	36	59	11	0	2	23	5	36	.246
Chin-lung Hu	22	20	2	1	0	0	0	1	1	1	.050
Fernando Martinez	11	22	3	5	2	0	1	2	0	1	.227
Daniel Murphy	109	391	49	125	28	2	6	49	5	24	.320
Mike Nickeas	21	53	4	10	1	0	1	6	0	4	.189
Ángel Pagán	123	478	68	125	24	4	7	56	32	44	.262
Valentino Pascucci	10	11	1	3	0	0	1	2	0	0	.273
Ronny Paulino	78	228	19	61	13	0	2	19	0	15	.268
Jason Pridie	101	208	28	48	11	3	4	20	7	24	.231
José Reyes	126	537	101	181	31	16	7	44	39	43	.337
Josh Satin	15	25	3	5	1	0	0	2	0	1	.200
Rubén Tejada	96	328	31	93	15	1	0	36	5	35	.284
Josh Thole	114	340	22	91	17	0	3	40	0	38	.268
Justin Turner	117	435	49	113	30	0	4	51	7	39	.260
David Wright	102	389	60	99	23	1	14	61	13	52	.254
Pitcher Totals	162	289	10	30	4	1	0	12	0	13	.104
Team totals	162	5600	718	1477	309	39	108	676	130	571	.264

=== Pitching ===
Note: W = Wins; L = Losses; ERA = Earned run average; G = Games pitched; GS = Games started; SV = Saves; IP = Innings pitched; H = Hits allowed; R = Runs allowed; ER = Earned runs allowed; BB = Walks allowed; SO = Strikeouts

Player	W	L	ERA	G	GS	SV	IP	H	R	ER	BB	SO
Manny Acosta	4	1	3.45	44	0	4	47.0	50	21	18	15	46
Miguel Batista	2	0	2.64	9	4	0	30.2	22	9	9	14	15
Pedro Beato	2	1	4.30	60	0	0	67.0	59	41	32	27	39
Blaine Boyer	0	2	10.80	5	0	1	6.2	13	8	8	1	1
Taylor Buchholz	1	1	3.12	23	0	0	26.0	22	10	9	7	26
Tim Byrdak	2	1	3.82	72	0	1	37.2	34	20	16	19	47
Chris Capuano	11	12	4.55	33	31	0	186.0	195	99	94	53	168
D.J. Carrasco	1	3	6.02	42	1	0	49.1	67	35	33	16	27
R.A. Dickey	8	13	3.28	33	32	0	208.2	202	85	76	54	134
Dillon Gee	13	6	4.43	30	27	0	160.2	150	85	79	71	114
Danny Herrera	0	1	1.13	16	0	0	8.0	7	1	1	2	5
Ryota Igarashi	4	1	4.66	45	0	0	38.2	43	20	20	28	42
Jason Isringhausen	3	3	4.05	53	0	7	46.2	36	23	21	24	44
Patrick Misch	1	0	10.29	6	0	0	7.0	11	8	8	4	5
Jon Niese	11	11	4.40	27	26	0	157.1	178	88	77	44	138
Michael O'Connor	0	1	2.70	9	0	0	6.2	5	2	2	3	8
Bobby Parnell	4	6	3.64	60	0	6	59.1	60	29	24	27	64
Mike Pelfrey	7	13	4.74	34	33	0	193.2	220	111	102	65	105
Francisco Rodríguez	2	2	3.16	42	0	23	42.2	44	15	15	16	46
Chris Schwinden	0	2	4.71	4	4	0	21.0	23	13	11	6	17
Josh Stinson	0	2	6.92	14	0	1	13.0	14	10	10	7	8
Dale Thayer	0	3	3.48	11	0	0	10.1	12	4	4	0	5
Chris Young	1	0	1.88	4	4	0	24.0	12	5	5	11	22
Team totals	77	85	4.19	162	162	43	1448.0	1482	742	674	514	1126

== Farm system ==
Level	Team	League	Manager
AAA	Buffalo Bisons	International League	Tim Teufel
AA	Binghamton Mets	Eastern League	Wally Backman
A	St. Lucie Mets	Florida State League	Pedro López
A	Savannah Sand Gnats	South Atlantic League	Ryan Ellis
A-Short Season	Brooklyn Cyclones	New York–Penn League	Rich Donnelly
Rookie	Kingsport Mets	Appalachian League	Frank Fultz
Rookie	GCL Mets	Gulf Coast League	Luis Rojas
