= Josh Stinson =

American baseball player (born 1988)

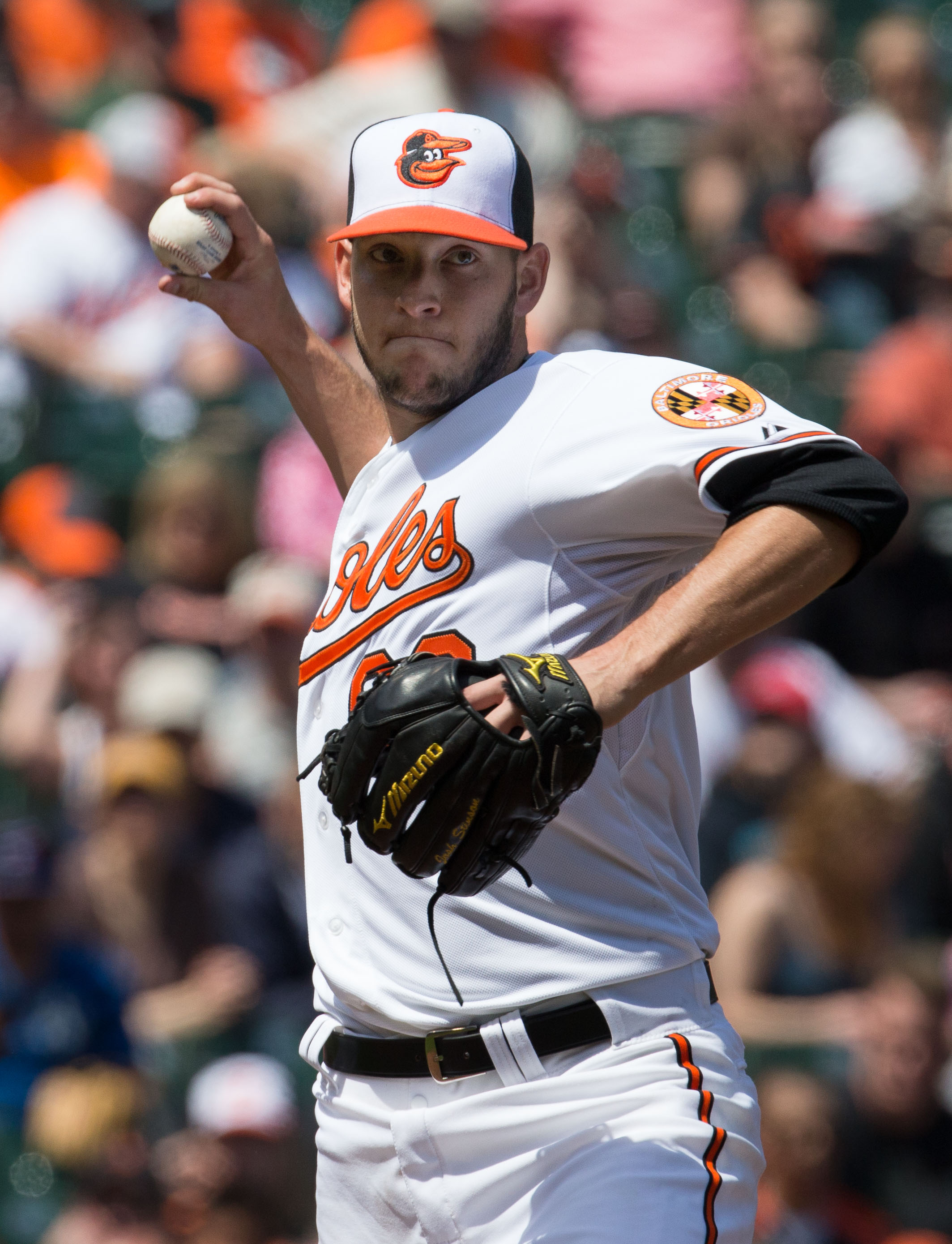
- Stinson with the Baltimore Orioles
- Pitcher
- Born: March 14, 1988 (age 38); Shreveport, Louisiana, U.S.
- Batted: Right Threw: Right

Professional debut
- MLB: September 2, 2011, for the New York Mets
- KBO: April 1, 2015, for the Kia Tigers

Last appearance
- MLB: June 13, 2014, for the Baltimore Orioles
- KBO: October 6, 2015, for the Kia Tigers

MLB statistics
- Win–loss record: 0–2
- Earned run average: 4.47
- Strikeouts: 29

KBO statistics
- Win–loss record: 11-10
- Earned run average: 4.96
- Strikeouts: 93
- Stats at Baseball Reference

Teams
- New York Mets (2011); Milwaukee Brewers (2012); Baltimore Orioles (2013–2014); Kia Tigers (2015)

Joshua Randall Stinson (born March 14, 1988) is an American former professional baseball pitcher. He played in Major League Baseball (MLB) for the New York Mets, Milwaukee Brewers and Baltimore Orioles. He also played in the KBO League for the Kia Tigers.

== Career ==
Prior to playing professionally, Stinson attended Northwood High School in Shreveport, Louisiana.

=== New York Mets ===
He was drafted by the New York Mets in the 37th round of the 2006 MLB draft and began his professional career that season.

He split 2006 between the GCL Mets and the Hagerstown Suns, going a combined 1–3 with a 1.79 ERA in 12 games (seven starts). In 2007, he pitched for the Savannah Sand Gnats and went 3–11 with a 4.86 ERA in 26 games (21 starts). With the Sand Gnats and St. Lucie Mets in 2008, Stinson posted a record of 3–8 with a 3.96 ERA in 28 games (eight starts). In 2009, he pitched for the Sand Gnats and St. Lucie Mets and went 5–3 with a 2.86 ERA in 50 games (only one start). He pitched for the Binghamton Mets and the Buffalo Bisons in 2010, going 11–5 with a 3.90 ERA in 36 games (18 starts).

Stinson made his major league debut on September 2, 2011 for the Mets against the Washington Nationals. He pitched 1 2/3 innings, giving up two hits and no runs. He also drew a walk in his first plate appearance.

=== Milwaukee Brewers ===
The Mets waived Stinson at the end of 2012 spring training, and he was claimed by the Milwaukee Brewers. He spent the 2012 season with Milwaukee's Double-A affiliate Huntsville Stars.

=== Oakland Athletics ===
Stinson was claimed off waivers by the Oakland Athletics on March 29, 2013.

=== Baltimore Orioles ===
On April 4, 2013, the Baltimore Orioles claimed Stinson off waivers, and optioned him to the Triple-A Norfolk Tides. He was recalled from the Single-A Frederick Keys on April 24 to start against the Toronto Blue Jays. He was optioned to Norfolk after the game.

Stinson was recalled from Norfolk by the Orioles on August 17, 2013, and optioned back to Norfolk on August 19. He was recalled again on September 3 after the major league rosters expanded.

Stinson was outrighted to Triple-A Norfolk on May 1, 2014. He was added to the roster again on June 9. Stinson was designated for assignment by Baltimore on June 17. He cleared waivers and was sent outright to Norfolk on June 21. Stinson elected free agency in October 2014.

=== Kia Tigers ===
Stinson signed a minor league deal with the Pittsburgh Pirates on October 23, 2014 but on December 29, he signed a one-year contract with the Kia Tigers of the KBO League.
