= Chris Capuano =

American baseball player (born 1978)

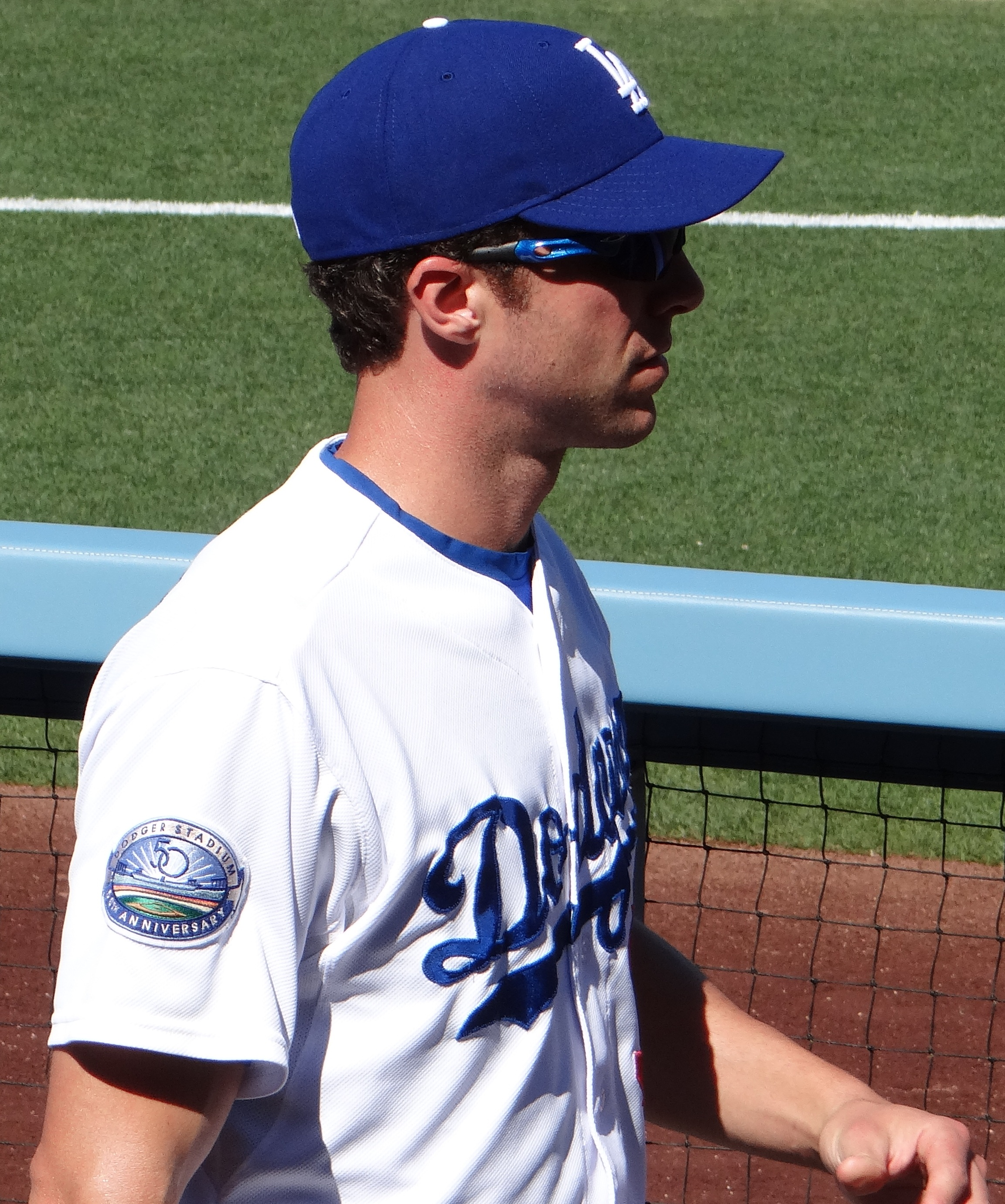
- Capuano with the Dodgers in 2012
- Pitcher
- Born: August 19, 1978 (age 48); West Springfield, Massachusetts, U.S.
- Batted: Left Threw: Left

MLB debut
- May 4, 2003, for the Arizona Diamondbacks

Last MLB appearance
- May 25, 2016, for the Milwaukee Brewers

MLB statistics
- Win–loss record: 77–92
- Earned run average: 4.38
- Strikeouts: 1,199
- Stats at Baseball Reference

Teams
- Arizona Diamondbacks (2003); Milwaukee Brewers (2004–2007, 2010); New York Mets (2011); Los Angeles Dodgers (2012–2013); Boston Red Sox (2014); New York Yankees (2014–2015); Milwaukee Brewers (2016)

Career highlights and awards
- All-Star (2006)
Medals
Men's baseball
Representing United States
Baseball World Cup
Silver medal – second place	2001 Taipei	National team

Christopher Frank Capuano (born August 19, 1978) is an American former professional baseball pitcher who played 12 seasons in Major League Baseball (MLB). He was selected by the Arizona Diamondbacks in the eighth round of the 1999 MLB draft. During his career, Capuano played for the Diamondbacks, Milwaukee Brewers, New York Mets, Los Angeles Dodgers, Boston Red Sox, and New York Yankees, and was named an MLB All-Star in 2006.

== Early life ==
Capuano was born and raised in West Springfield, Massachusetts. During his youth, he was a multi-sport athlete, competing in baseball, basketball, and soccer. He grew up as a fan of the Boston Red Sox and recalls playing whiffle ball as a child in his backyard with friends, imagining themselves pitching at Fenway Park in Boston.

Capuano attended St. Thomas the Apostle School in West Springfield from kindergarten through eighth grade and graduated as valedictorian from Cathedral High School in Springfield in 1996.

== College career ==
Capuano was selected by the Pittsburgh Pirates in the 45th round of the 1996 MLB draft out of high school but chose not to sign, instead accepting a baseball scholarship to Duke University over offers from Dartmouth and Yale. While at Duke, he played for the Blue Devils baseball team and was a member of the Xi chapter of the Alpha Tau Omega fraternity. Following his junior year, he was drafted by the Arizona Diamondbacks in the eighth round of the 1999 MLB draft. Having signed a professional contract, NCAA rules rendered him ineligible to play college baseball during his senior year. He completed his studies as a regular student and graduated from Duke in 2000 with a degree in economics, earning a 3.86 GPA and election to Phi Beta Kappa. Over his collegiate career from 1997 to 1999, Capuano made 33 starts for the Blue Devils, ranking ninth in school history with 251 strikeouts, behind Marcus Stroman’s record of 290.

Capuano played collegiate summer baseball with the Cotuit Kettleers of the Cape Cod Baseball League during the summers of 1997 and 1998, and returned in 1999 to play for the Bourne Braves.

== Professional career ==
=== Draft and minor leagues ===
Capuano was selected 238th overall by the Arizona Diamondbacks in the eighth round of the 1999 MLB draft. He played for the South Bend Silver Hawks of the Class A Midwest League in 2000 and the El Paso Diablos of the Class AA Texas League in 2001. Capuano began the 2002 season with the Tucson Sidewinders of the Class AAA Pacific Coast League (PCL), posting a 4–1 record with a 2.72 ERA before undergoing Tommy John surgery on May 17, which sidelined him for the remainder of the season.

=== Arizona Diamondbacks (2003) ===
Capuano made his MLB debut with the Arizona Diamondbacks on May 4, 2003, against the Atlanta Braves, absorbing the loss in a two-inning relief appearance during extra innings. He made his first major league start on May 17 against the Pittsburgh Pirates, lasting only 4 2/3 innings while allowing seven earned runs and taking the loss. Following that start, he was optioned back to the minors but was called up again for a spot start on July 9 against the San Diego Padres. In that outing, he pitched seven innings, allowed just one unearned run, and earned his first major league win. Afterward, he returned to the minors where he made 23 starts for the Sidewinders, posting a 9–5 record with a 3.34 ERA, which earned him Pacific Coast League All-Star honors. Capuano was recalled to the Diamondbacks in September when rosters expanded and finished the season with nine MLB appearances, including five starts, compiling a 2–4 record with a 4.64 ERA.

=== Milwaukee Brewers (2004–2007, 2010) ===
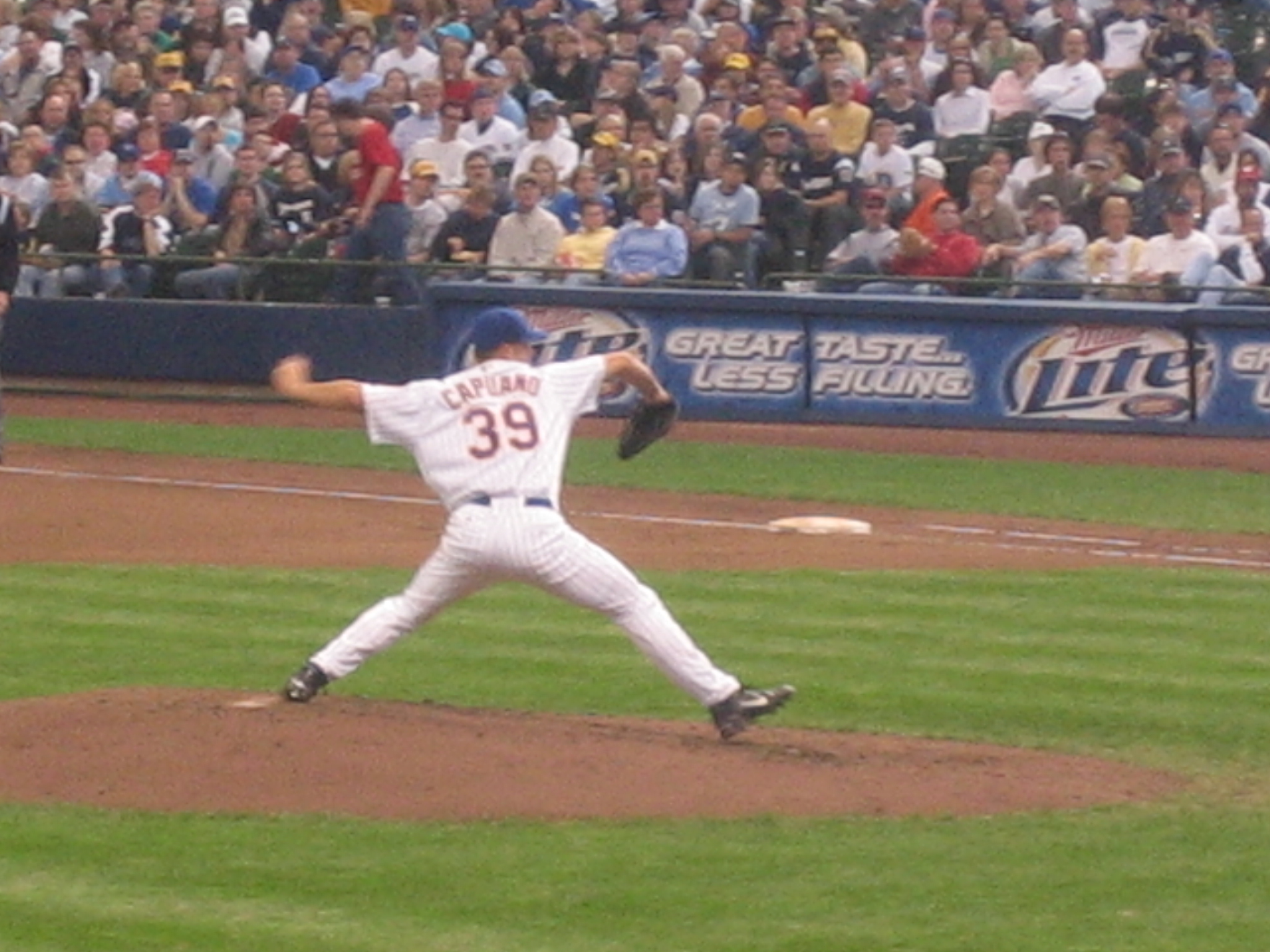
Capuano pitching for the Milwaukee Brewers in 2006.

On December 1, 2003, Capuano was traded to the Milwaukee Brewers (along with Craig Counsell, Lyle Overbay, Junior Spivey, Jorge de la Rosa and Chad Moeller) for Shane Nance, Richie Sexson and minor leaguer Noochie Varner. He made 17 starts for the Brewers in 2004 and was 6–8 with a 4.99 ERA.

His 2005 season with the Brewers proved to be a break-out year as he posted 18 wins, the highest total for a Brewer since Teddy Higuera in 1987. He also led the National League in quality starts during the 2005 season. In 2006, Capuano continued his excellent pitching by taking over as the team's new ace with Ben Sheets injured and was named to the 2006 Major League Baseball All-Star Game as a replacement for Tom Glavine. Capuano, however, ended up with only 11 wins in 2006.

Capuano started the 2007 season 5–0 and then the Milwaukee Brewers lost the next 22 games Capuano pitched in from May 12 to September 28. In June he hit his first major league home run against the Florida Marlins.

Before the start of the 2008 season, he underwent Tommy John surgery for the second time in his career and missed the entire season.

The Brewers non-tendered Capuano following the 2008 season, making him a free agent but re-signed him to a minor league deal shortly after. He was ultimately limited to just a handful of games in the Brewers rookie leagues as part of his rehab. After becoming a free agent at the end of the season, Capuano was re-signed to a minor league contract with the Brewers on November 23, 2009.

Capuano was invited to the Milwaukee Brewers' spring training for the 2010 season, but early on he complained of arm soreness and was placed in extended spring training. He would start the regular season with the Single A, Brevard County Manatees of the Florida State League. Capuano would only need 3 appearances with the Manatees before being promoted to the Triple-A Nashville Sounds. In those 3 appearances, Capuano registered a 2–0 record with a 1.23 ERA and 17 strikeouts in 14 2/3 innings pitched. On May 28, 2010, Capuano made his final start for the Sounds, and was pulled after four innings. After the game, it was announced the Brewers had purchased his minor league contract and he was recalled to the majors.

Capuano started the Brewers' June 3, 2010, game against the Florida Marlins in Miami, giving up three runs on seven hits in 3 2/3 innings while striking out four and walking one. He was charged with the loss in the 3–2 Marlins win. On July 3, he appeared in a Brewers victory against the St. Louis Cardinals in St. Louis. This snapped the streak of 26 straight losses he had appeared in between 2007 and 2010. He held the Pittsburgh Pirates to one run on three hits over five innings on July 19 to get his first win since 2007.

=== New York Mets (2011) ===
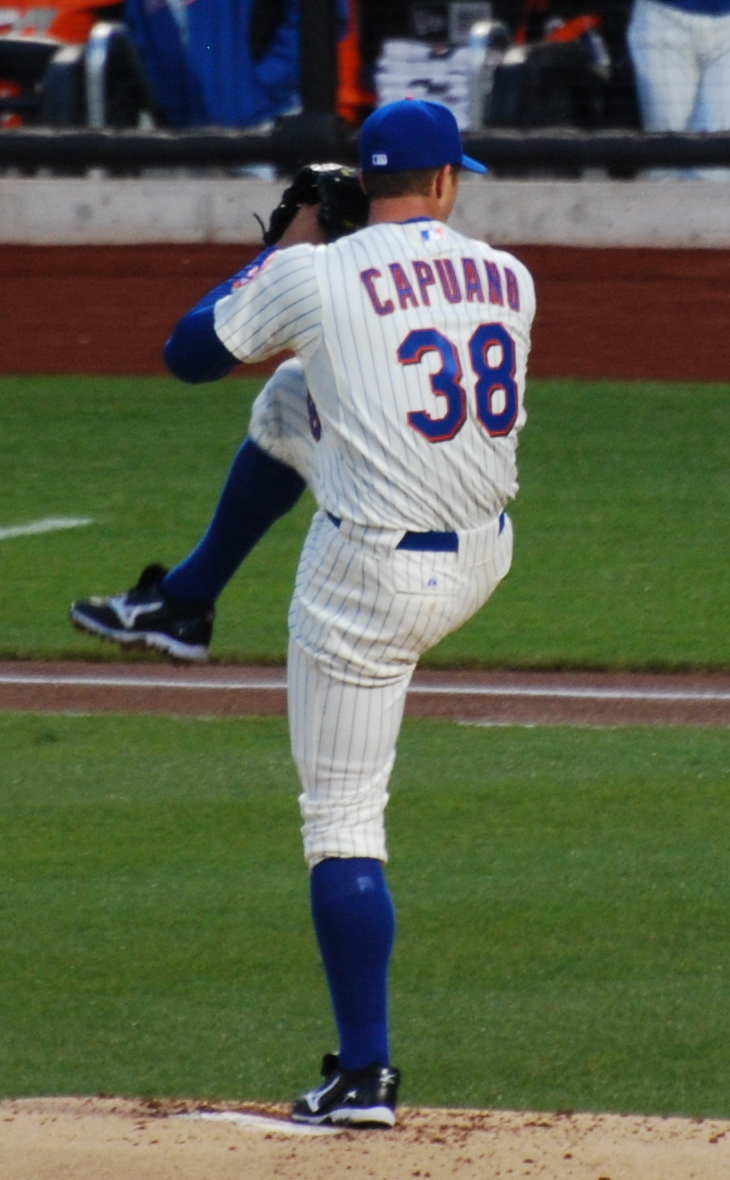
Capuano pitching for the New York Mets in 2011.

Capuano signed with the New York Mets prior to the 2011 season. On August 26, 2011, while pitching against the Atlanta Braves, he threw his first complete game shutout since 2005, setting a career-high with 13 strikeouts in the game. During the 2011 season, Capuano made 31 starts for the Mets—his most since 2006—and also appeared twice in relief. He finished the season with an 11–12 record and a 4.55 ERA.

=== Los Angeles Dodgers (2012–2013) ===
On December 2, 2011, Capuano signed a two-year deal with the Los Angeles Dodgers. He started the 2012 season strong, with a 9–4 record and 2.91 in his first 18 starts but went only 3–8 with a 4.76 in his last 15 starts. Overall, he was 12–12 with a 3.72 in 33 starts.

Capuano began the 2013 season in the bullpen due to the Dodgers having too many starting pitchers. He got the start on April 16 due to an injury to Zack Greinke but suffered a strained left calf and only lasted three innings. He wound up making 20 starts for the team in 2013, despite missing time with various injuries. He also appeared in four games out of the bullpen. His final record was 4–7 with a 4.26 ERA. He pitched out of the bullpen in the playoffs.

=== Boston Red Sox (2014) ===
On February 20, 2014, Capuano reportedly agreed to a $2.25 million, one-year contract with the Boston Red Sox. He passed his physical and the deal was made official on February 22, 2014.

Capuano began the 2014 season with 15 consecutive scoreless innings. From May 3 through June 23, 2014, he allowed 17 runs over 16 2/3 innings. On June 25, he was designated for assignment. He was released on July 1.

Shortly after his release from the Red Sox, Capuano signed a minor league contract with the Colorado Rockies on July 4, 2014. He pitched for the Tulsa Drillers of the Texas League and the Colorado Springs Sky Sox of the PCL, making a total of four starts between the two teams.

=== New York Yankees (2014–2015) ===
On July 24, 2014, Capuano was traded to the New York Yankees from the Rockies for cash considerations. In 12 starts for the Yankees, Capuano went 2–3 with a 4.25 ERA.

Despite being a free agent, Capuano pitched for the MLB All-Star team in the 2014 MLB Japan All-Star Series. Wearing a Yankee uniform, he started two games for the MLB All-Stars, allowing just one earned run on five hits and striking out seven batters.

On December 16, 2014, Capuano re-signed with the Yankees on a one-year, $5 million contract. He was designated for assignment on July 29, 2015. He was called back up by the Yankees on August 12 and designated for assignment again three days later. The Yankees then recalled him again on August 18 to take the place of Bryan Mitchell, who had been injured by a line drive during a spot start the previous evening.

After being designated for assignment once again on August 22, he elected free agency on August 24. However, due to an injury to CC Sabathia, Capuano immediately re-signed with the Yankees. He was designated for assignment yet again the following day when Michael Pineda was activated from the DL. He was called up again on September 7.

=== Milwaukee Brewers (2016) ===
In January 2016, Capuano signed a minor league contract with the Milwaukee Brewers, marking his second stint with the organization. After spring training, he secured a place on the major league roster and performed effectively out of the bullpen during the first two months of the season until sustaining an elbow injury in a game against the Atlanta Braves.

=== Retirement ===
On March 6, 2018, Capuano retired from professional baseball.

== International career ==
Capuano played on Team USA in the 2001 Baseball World Cup and helped the team earn a silver medal.

In the 2006 and 2014 editions of the MLB Japan All-Star Series, Capuano represented the MLB All-Stars in exhibition games against the NPB All-Stars and Samurai Japan, respectively.

== Pitching style ==
Capuano was primarily a finesse pitcher who relied on his deceptive delivery, accuracy, and ability to change speeds. His fastball averaged in the upper 80s, occasionally reaching the low 90s, particularly early in games or later in his career during relief appearances. Capuano also threw a slider and a changeup, and he possessed an excellent pickoff move; in 2005, he led the MLB with 12 pickoffs.

== Personal life ==
Capuano is of Italian descent; his paternal grandparents immigrated to the United States from Italy, and his father, Frank Capuano, was the youngest of 13 children who played college baseball as a shortstop and centerfielder for American International College in Springfield, Massachusetts.

Capuano graduated from Duke University in 2000 with a degree in economics.

While a member of the Milwaukee Brewers, Capuano appeared alongside teammates J.J. Hardy, Bill Hall, and Jeff Suppan in a cameo on an episode of the CBS soap opera The Young and the Restless, which aired on June 20, 2007.

After his playing career, Capuano pursued further education by obtaining an MBA from the MIT Sloan Fellows Program, graduating in 2019. During his time at MIT, he served as a strategy and development advisor for Proteus Motion, initially focusing on its flagship fitness and training technology platform. On July 5, 2019, Capuano was appointed Director of Operations at the Major League Baseball Players Association (MLBPA). In 2022, he was promoted to Senior Director of Operations, Business, and Strategy.

Capuano is married to Annalisa Rotunno, a fellow MIT alumnus and experienced investment banker specializing in mergers and acquisitions and corporate development across the United States and Europe.
