= Matt Garza =

American baseball player (born 1983)

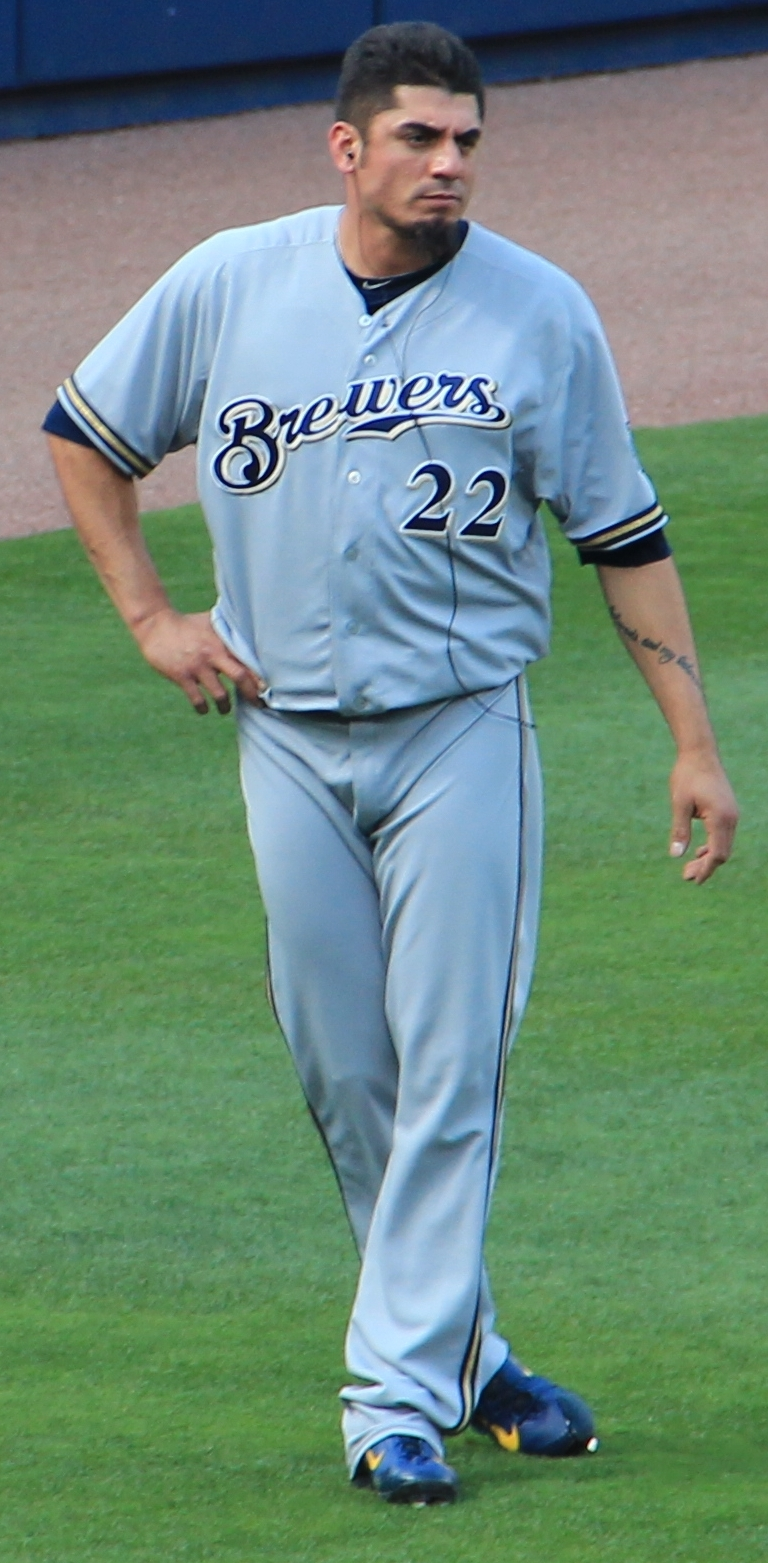
- Garza with the Milwaukee Brewers in 2014
- Pitcher
- Born: November 26, 1983 (age 42); Selma, California, U.S.
- Batted: Right Threw: Right

MLB debut
- August 11, 2006, for the Minnesota Twins

Last MLB appearance
- September 27, 2017, for the Milwaukee Brewers

MLB statistics
- Win–loss record: 93–106
- Earned run average: 4.09
- Strikeouts: 1,380
- Stats at Baseball Reference

Teams
- Minnesota Twins (2006–2007); Tampa Bay Rays (2008–2010); Chicago Cubs (2011–2013); Texas Rangers (2013); Milwaukee Brewers (2014–2017)

Career highlights and awards
- ALCS MVP (2008); Pitched a no-hitter on July 26, 2010

Matthew Scott Garza (born November 26, 1983) is an American former professional baseball pitcher. He made his Major League Baseball (MLB) debut in 2006 with the Minnesota Twins, and also played in MLB for the Tampa Bay Rays, Chicago Cubs, Texas Rangers and Milwaukee Brewers. With the Rays, Garza was named the American League Championship Series Most Valuable Player in 2008, and threw a no-hitter on July 26, 2010.

== Amateur career ==
Born in Selma, California, south of Fresno. Garza attended Washington Union High School in Easton, California, where he starred in baseball and football. Garza continued with baseball at Fresno State. After struggling his first two years at Fresno State, Garza excelled in his junior season, averaging 10 strikeouts per nine innings pitched.

== Professional career ==
=== Minnesota Twins ===
Garza was the 25th pick in the first round of the 2005 Major League Baseball draft, drafted by the Minnesota Twins.

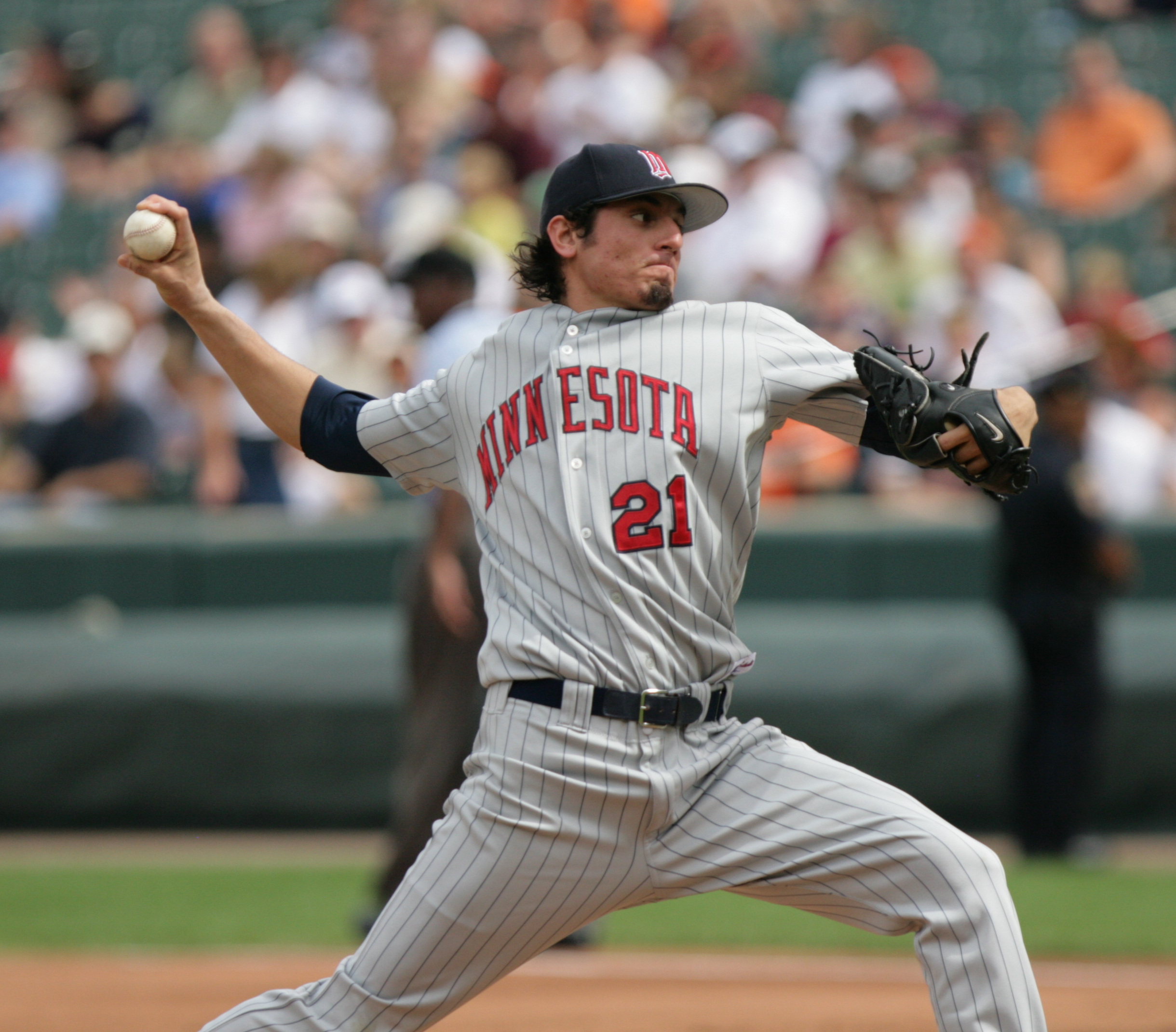
Garza pitching for the Minnesota Twins in 2006.

Entering 2006, Garza was ranked as the Minnesota Twins seventh-best prospect by Baseball America. He gained attention for rising through the ranks of the Twins' minor league system, starting the season at Single-A Fort Myers and ending at the major league level, pitching with the Double-A New Britain Rock Cats and the Triple-A Rochester Red Wings in between. Garza was a combined 14–4 at the three minor league levels in 2006, with a 1.99 ERA and 154 strikeouts in 135 2/3 innings. He earned All-Star berths in the Single-A Florida State League and Double-A Eastern League. Backed by those numbers, Garza earned the USA Today Minor League Player of the Year Award for 2006, the second consecutive year in which a Twin won the award (in 2005, Garza's teammate Francisco Liriano was the winner). On August 8, Minnesota purchased Garza's contract, promoting him to the majors to replace the injured Liriano. Garza is one of a small number of players to advance through the minors and reach the major league level in a single season. On August 11, his major league debut, Garza allowed seven earned runs in 2 2/3 innings to the Toronto Blue Jays. Garza earned his first win on August 23 against the Baltimore Orioles, allowing just one unearned run in six innings.

Entering 2007, Garza was rated as the top prospect in the Twins organization and the 21st-best prospect in Major League Baseball by Baseball America. Garza did not make the Twins rotation out of spring training, being assigned to Rochester instead. He was recalled to the Minnesota Twins on June 28 after being passed by other Twins pitching prospects such as Kevin Slowey and Scott Baker due to disagreements with the club over his pitch selection. He was selected to the 2007 All-Star Futures Game in San Francisco, but did not get to participate due to his call up to the major league club. On July 6, in a game against the Chicago White Sox at U.S. Cellular Field, Garza became the first Twins pitcher to bat in an American League game since Allan Anderson in 1989. Garza was put in the eight-spot when catcher Mike Redmond left the game after his head was cut by Jim Thome's bat on a backswing. Joe Mauer, the designated hitter for the game, replaced Redmond as the catcher, forcing Garza into the lineup. On July 29, Garza recorded a career-high 11 strikeouts in six innings against the Cleveland Indians.

=== Tampa Bay Rays ===
After the 2007 season, the Twins traded Garza, along with Jason Bartlett and Eduardo Morlan to the Tampa Bay Rays for Delmon Young, Jason Pridie, and Brendan Harris. Garza had a successful 2008 season with the Rays, going 11–9 while posting a 3.70 ERA. He also earned MVP honors for the ALCS in which he helped the Rays beat the Boston Red Sox by posting a 1.38 ERA in two starts, and earning the decisive victory in game 7 of the ALCS.

On June 26, 2008, Garza carried a perfect game through six innings against the Florida Marlins before giving up a leadoff home run in the seventh inning to Hanley Ramírez. The home run proved his only blemish as he won the complete game with 10 strikeouts and one walk.

As of the end of July 2009, opposing batters were hitting .222 against Garza, which was the second-lowest batting average in the league; he was just behind Edwin Jackson (.216), and was followed by Jarrod Washburn (.224) and Scott Feldman (.228; .217 as a starter).

In 2009, Garza had the lowest range factor of all starting major league pitchers (0.93).

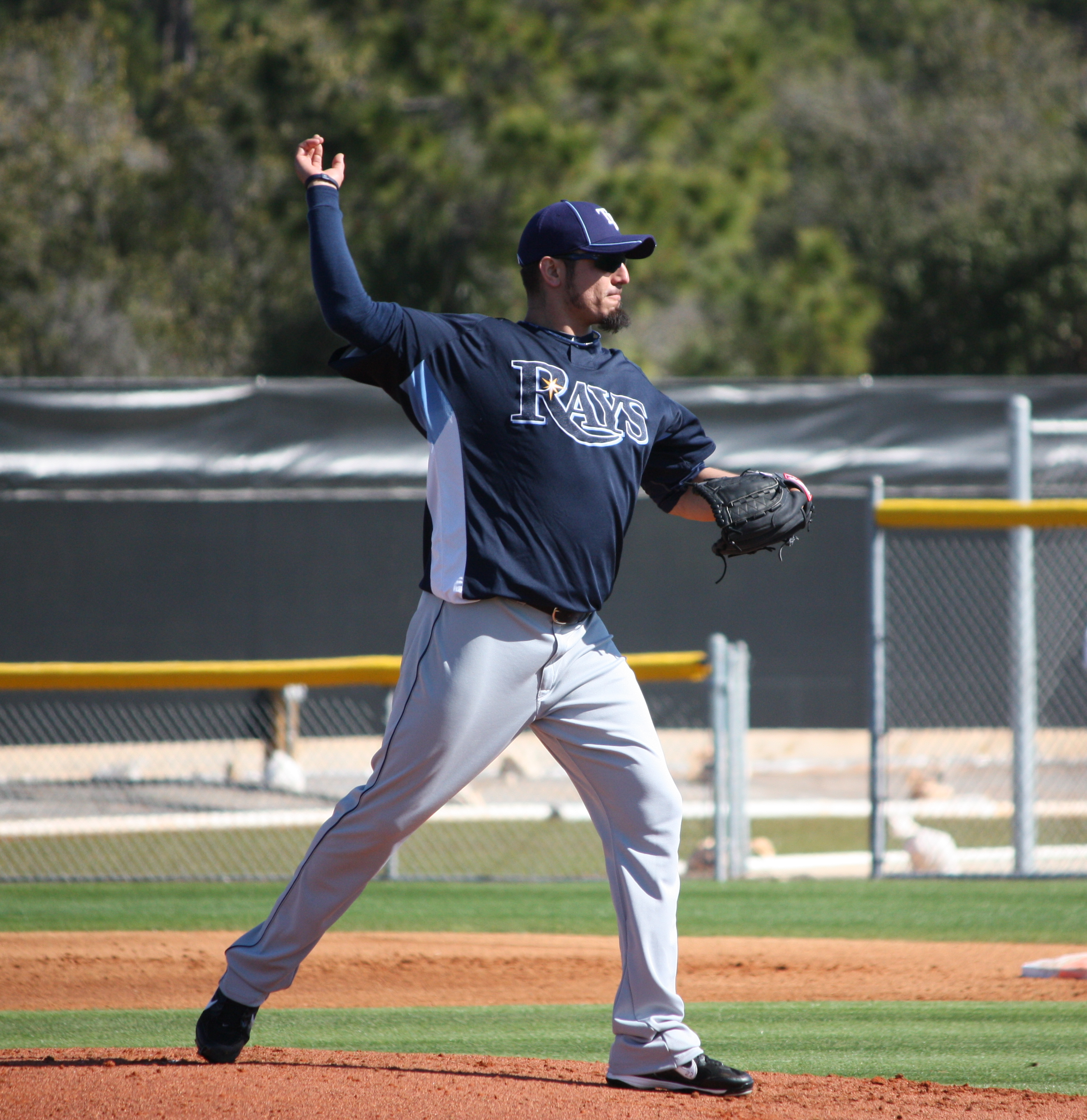
Garza during his tenure with the Tampa Bay Rays in 2010 spring training.

Garza threw a no-hitter on July 26, 2010, at home against the Detroit Tigers, becoming the fifth pitcher that season to throw a no-hitter. It was also the first no-hitter thrown by a Tampa Bay Rays pitcher in the team's history (and so far it remains the only no-hitter in a nine-inning game). He faced the minimum 27 batters as the lone base runner, Brennan Boesch, who drew a one-out second inning walk, was erased on a double play ball hit by Ryan Raburn in the next at-bat. Garza threw 120 pitches, 80 for strikes, and tallied six strikeouts. 101 of his pitches were fastballs.

=== Chicago Cubs ===
On January 7, 2011, Garza was traded from the Rays to the Chicago Cubs as part of an eight-player deal. The Cubs sent outfielder Sam Fuld, and prospects Chris Archer, Hak-Ju Lee, Brandon Guyer, and Robinson Chirinos to the Rays for Garza, outfielder Fernando Perez and minor league left-handed pitcher Zac Rosscup. In spring training, Garza led all pitchers in the major leagues in earned runs given up, with 25, in 21.2 innings. Garza finished the season with a 10–10 record and a 3.32 ERA.

=== Texas Rangers ===
On July 22, 2013, The Cubs traded Garza to the Texas Rangers in exchange for Mike Olt, Justin Grimm, C. J. Edwards, and Neil Ramirez. With the Rangers, Garza had an ERA of 4.38.

=== Milwaukee Brewers ===
After the 2013 season, the Milwaukee Brewers reportedly agreed to sign Garza to what was initially reported as a four-year, $52 million contract. On January 26, 2014, the Brewers announced that the signing was official. The deal is reportedly guaranteed for $50 million over the course of four years, with each season having an additional $1 million in performance bonuses. There is also a performance/appearance based vesting option for a fifth year, worth $13 million, making the total contract worth as much as 5 years and $67 million. With the contract, Garza became the most expensive free agent that the Brewers have ever signed, surpassing Jeff Suppan's four year, $42 million contract signed prior to the 2007 season.

During the 2015 season, it was announced that Garza would be shut down for the rest of the season due to poor performance and the club wanting to look at younger starters. Garza reacted badly to the idea and did not pitch in any of the team's final 28 games. Garza finished his 2016 season 6–8 with a 4.51 ERA. On June 3, 2017, Garza suffered a shoulder injury in a collision with first baseman Jesus Aguilar. He attempted to pitch the rest of the season through it, but struggled badly down the stretch and lost his spot in the rotation, finishing the final year of his contract with a 6–9 record and a 4.94 ERA. After the season, Garza's injury was diagnosed as a torn labrum in the right shoulder. On January 10, 2018, Garza, now a free agent, underwent surgery to repair the labrum, performed by Dr. Neal ElAttrache, and was ruled out for the entire 2018 season.

== Scouting ==
Garza throws a 2-seam fastball that varies from 90 to 92 mph, as well as a 4-seam fastball that varies from 91 to 94 mph that can, on occasion, reach 95 mph. His arsenal also includes a big, breaking curveball that he throws for 72–77 mph, a hard, tight slider in the mid 80s, and an occasional changeup he uses to fool hitters, especially lefties. His slider is considered his best strikeout pitch, and he is capable of throwing it for strikes late in the count to keep batters off balance.

When played for the Rays, pitching coach Jim Hickey commented that Garza had "the best stuff on the staff".

== Personal life ==
Garza is married to his high school sweetheart; together they have six children. Garza is of Mexican descent.

As someone who has had to deal with teen pregnancy (Garza was 18 when his first child was born), he was invited to sit on a panel for The Candie's Foundation in New York City about combating teen pregnancy on May 6, 2009.

== See also ==
- List of Major League Baseball annual shutout leaders

Achievements
Preceded by Edwin Jackson	No-hitter pitcher July 26, 2010	Succeeded by Roy Halladay
