= Eduardo Morlan =

Cuban baseball player (born 1986)

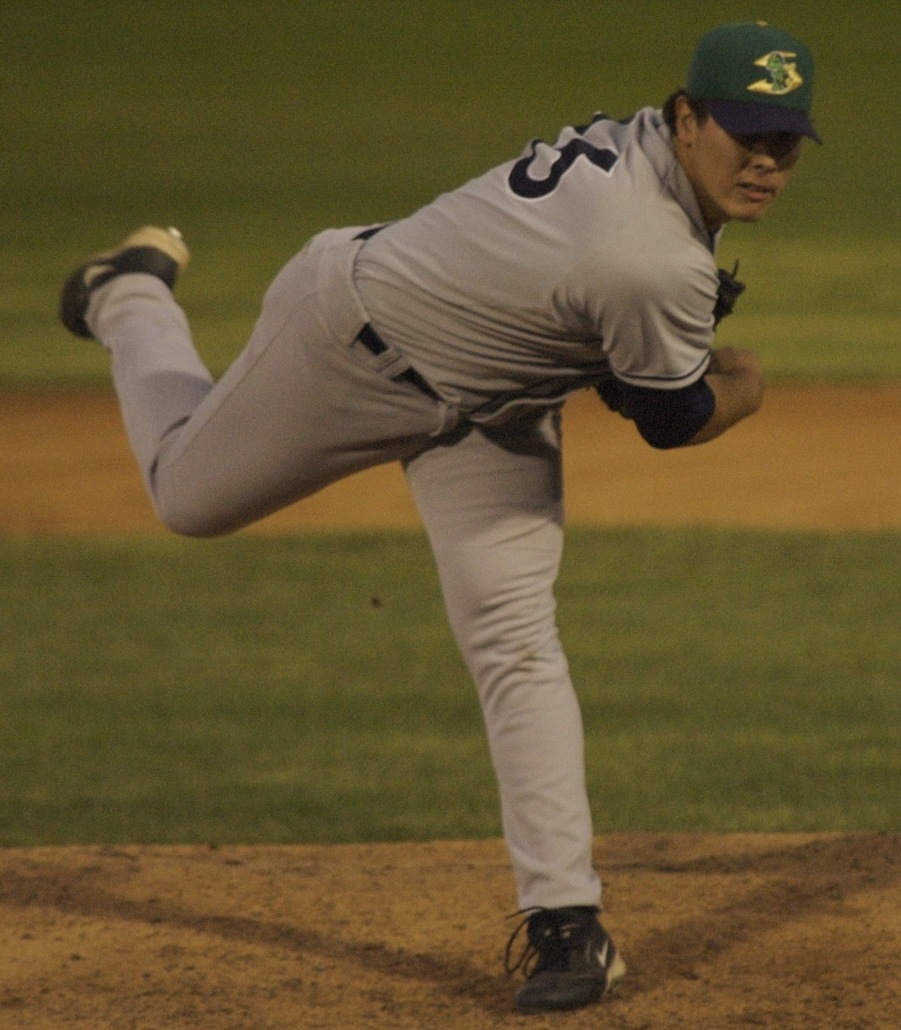
- Morlan with the Beloit Snappers in 2006

Free agent
- Pitcher
- Born: March 1, 1986 (age 40); Havana, Cuba
- Bats: Right Throws: Right
- Stats at Baseball Reference

Eduardo Morlan Del Rio (born March 1, 1986) is a Cuban professional baseball pitcher who is a free agent.

He was drafted by the Minnesota Twins in the third round of the 2004 draft, and was acquired by the Rays after the 2007 season. He started the 2008 season with the Montgomery Biscuits of the Double-A Southern League.

== Baseball career ==
Eduardo Morlan attended Coral Park High School in Miami, Florida, where he played for the school's baseball team. He was drafted by the Minnesota Twins in the third round of the 2004 Major League Baseball draft, and was signed by Hector Otero. After being signed, Morlan was assigned to the Gulf Coast Twins of the Rookie-level Gulf Coast League (GCL).

Morlan made his professional debut as a member of the GCL Twins, and appeared in 11 games, making two starts. Morlan began the 2005 season at Elizabethton Twins of the Rookie-level Appalachian League, and made four starts, posting a 0.82 earned run average (ERA). Morlan spent the entire 2006 season with the Beloit Snappers of the Class-A Midwest League, and appeared in 28 games, making 18 starts. He was named a Midwest League All-Star after he posted a 2.29 ERA in 106 1/3 innings pitched, struck out 125 batters, and held opponents to a .202 batting average. Morlan pitched in 2007 for the Fort Myers Miracle of the Class-A Advanced Florida State League (FSL), When the names were rolled out for the 2007 FSL All-Star Game, Morlan represented the Miracle.

In December 2007, Morlan was included in a deal that sent him, Matt Garza, and Jason Bartlett to the Tampa Bay Rays for Delmon Young, Brendan Harris, and Jason Pridie.

Morlan was assigned to the Montgomery Biscuits of the Class-AA Southern League in 2008, where he served as the team's closer. He missed most of the first half of the 2008 season, injuring his shoulder after six relatively ineffective performances to begin the season. He returned, finishing the season with a 4-2 win–loss record, a 3.64 ERA and one save. He was chosen to represent the World Team in the 2008 All-Star Futures Game.

The Rays did not add Morlan to the 40 man roster after the 2008 season, exposing him to the Rule 5 draft. He was chosen by the Milwaukee Brewers in the Rule 5 draft that winter, and added to their 40-man roster. However, during spring training, he was designated for assignment and returned to the Rays.

He rejoined the Biscuits’ bullpen a few weeks, but has only made five relief appearances since coming back to the team. In 13 innings pitched, he has surrendered 17 hits, two of which were home runs, eight runs (seven earned).

Morlan returned to the Biscuits in 2009, and he was named to the Southern League All-Star Game. He again pitched for Montgomery in 2010.

== Scouting report ==
Morlan’s three-pitch repertoire. The 6 ft 2 in (188 cm) 210 lb (95 kg) righty has been clocked approaching 100 mph (160 km/h) on his fastball. His curveball is rated as one of the five best in the Minnesota organization by Scout.com, and he has confidence to throw both the breaker and his above-average change in fastball counts.

== See also ==
- Rule 5 draft results
