= Brendan Harris =

American baseball player (born 1980)

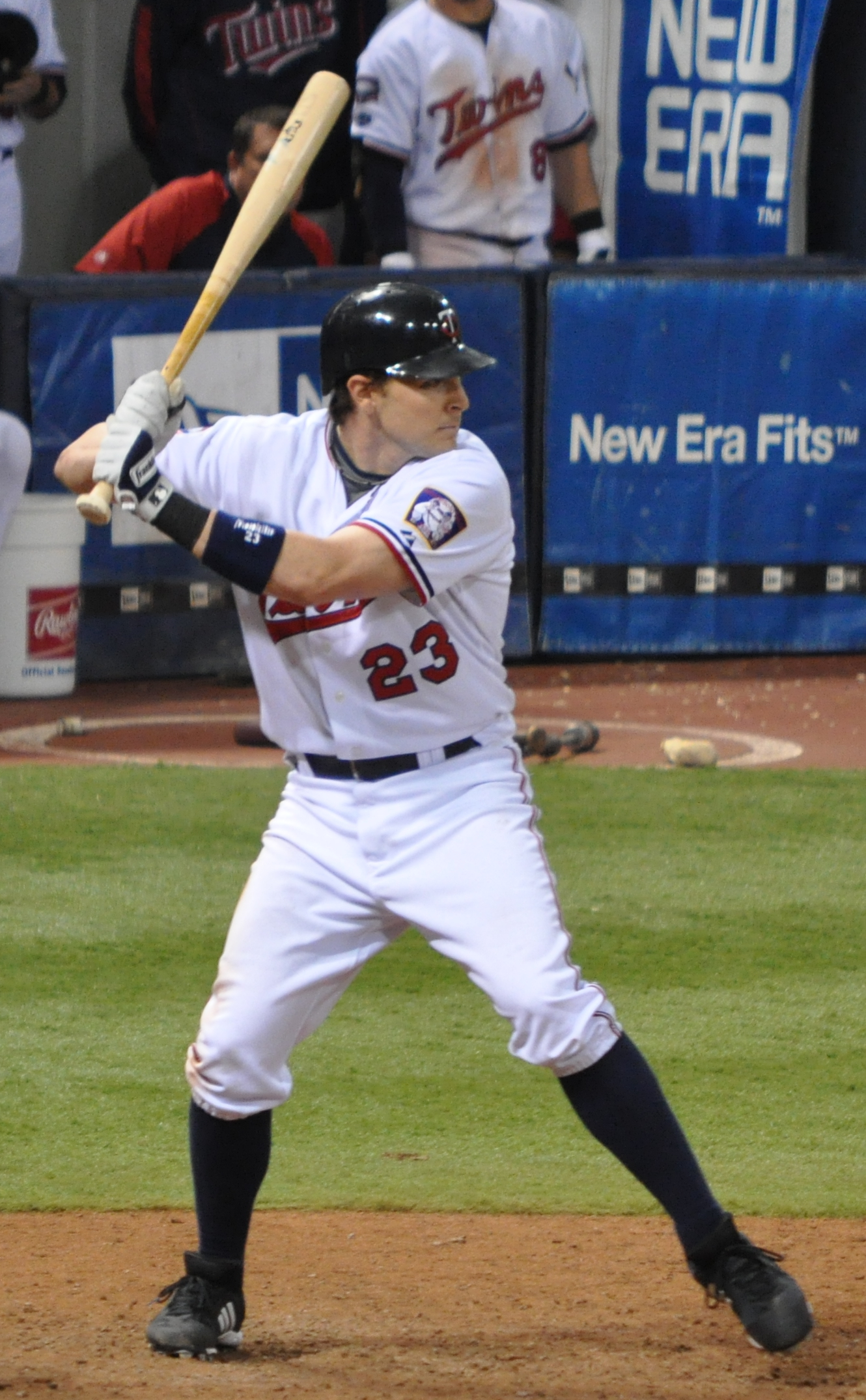
- Harris with the Minnesota Twins
- Infielder
- Born: August 26, 1980 (age 46); Queensbury, New York, U.S.
- Batted: Right Threw: Right

MLB debut
- July 6, 2004, for the Chicago Cubs

Last MLB appearance
- July 10, 2013, for the Los Angeles Angels of Anaheim

MLB statistics
- Batting average: .256
- Home runs: 33
- Runs batted in: 167
- Stats at Baseball Reference

Teams
- Chicago Cubs (2004); Montreal Expos / Washington Nationals (2004–2006); Cincinnati Reds (2006); Tampa Bay Devil Rays (2007); Minnesota Twins (2008–2010); Los Angeles Angels of Anaheim (2013)

Brendan Michael Harris (born August 26, 1980) is an American former professional baseball infielder. He played in Major League Baseball for the Chicago Cubs, Montreal Expos/Washington Nationals, Cincinnati Reds, Tampa Bay Devil Rays, Minnesota Twins, and Los Angeles Angels of Anaheim.

== Early years ==
Harris grew up in Queensbury, New York, and led the Queensbury High School Spartans to the 1996 and 1998 State Baseball Tournament. He subsequently attended the College of William and Mary, where he was a third-team College All-American and Colonial Athletic Association All-Star in 2001, when he hit .390 with 18 home runs and 69 RBI. In 2000 and 2001, he played collegiate summer baseball with the Hyannis Mets of the Cape Cod Baseball League and was named a league all-star in 2000. Harris was selected in the fifth round (138th overall) of the 2001 Major League Baseball draft by the Chicago Cubs and signed with the Cubs on July 21, 2001. He was inducted into the William and Mary Athletic Hall of Fame in 2012 along with fellow alum and current Pittsburgh Steelers head coach Mike Tomlin. Harris was also active with the MLB Players Association as a player representative with the Rays and the Twins.

== Professional career ==
=== Chicago Cubs ===
Harris began his professional career in 2001 with the Single-A Lansing Lugnuts of the Midwest League, batting .274 with four home runs and 22 RBI in 32 games. In 2002, with the Single-A Daytona Cubs, he hit .329 in with 13 homers and 54 RBI in 110 games. He was selected as a Florida State League All-Star and also a High-A All-Star, leading to a promotion to the Double-A West Tenn Diamond Jaxx at the end of the season. In 2003, he played in 120 games with the Diamond Jaxx and hit .281 with five home runs and 52 RBI.

Prior to the 2004 season, Harris was ranked as the Cubs' eighth-best prospect by Baseball America. He began the season with the Triple-A Iowa Cubs in the Pacific Coast League. He hit .311 with eight home runs and 26 RBI in 56 games, leading to his first Major League call-up with the Cubs on July 3.

Harris made his major-league debut on July 6, 2004, as the starting third baseman against the Milwaukee Brewers. In the first inning, he committed an error that led to four unearned runs, but recovered by posting his first Major League hit with an RBI double off Víctor Santos in the third inning. In three games with the Cubs, he was 2-for-9 (.222) with an RBI.

=== Montreal Expos/Washington Nationals ===
On July 31, 2004, Harris was traded to the Montreal Expos as part of an eight-player, four-team trade that sent brought Nomar Garciaparra and Matt Murton to Chicago, Doug Mientkiewicz and Orlando Cabrera to the Boston Red Sox, minor leaguer Justin Jones to the Minnesota Twins and Harris, Francis Beltrán and Alex Gonzalez to Montreal. Harris appeared in 20 games for Montréal, batting .160 with one home run and two RBI in 50 at-bats. His home run, the first of his MLB career, was hit on September 15, off Josias Manzanillo of the Florida Marlins. He also played in 35 games for the Triple-A Edmonton Trappers, batting .285 with six home runs and 24 RBI.

The Expos moved to Washington, D. C. in 2005 and became the Washington Nationals. Harris spent most of 2005 and 2006 with the team's new Triple-A affiliate, the New Orleans Zephyrs. He hit .270 with 13 home runs and 81 RBI in 127 games in 2005, and .283 with five home runs and 32 RBI in 59 games in 2006. With the Nationals, he only appeared in four games in 2005 (3-for-9, one home run, 3 RBI) and 17 games in 2006 (8-for-32, 2 RBI).

=== Cincinnati Reds ===
On July 13, 2006, Harris was sent by Washington along with Gary Majewski, Bill Bray, Daryl Thompson, and Royce Clayton to the Cincinnati Reds in exchange for Felipe López, Austin Kearns, and Ryan Wagner. He played in 43 games with the Triple-A Louisville Bats in the International League, hitting .324 with five home runs and 28 RBI. With the Reds, he appeared in only eight games, and was 2-for-10 (.200) with one home run and one RBI.

=== Tampa Bay Devil Rays ===
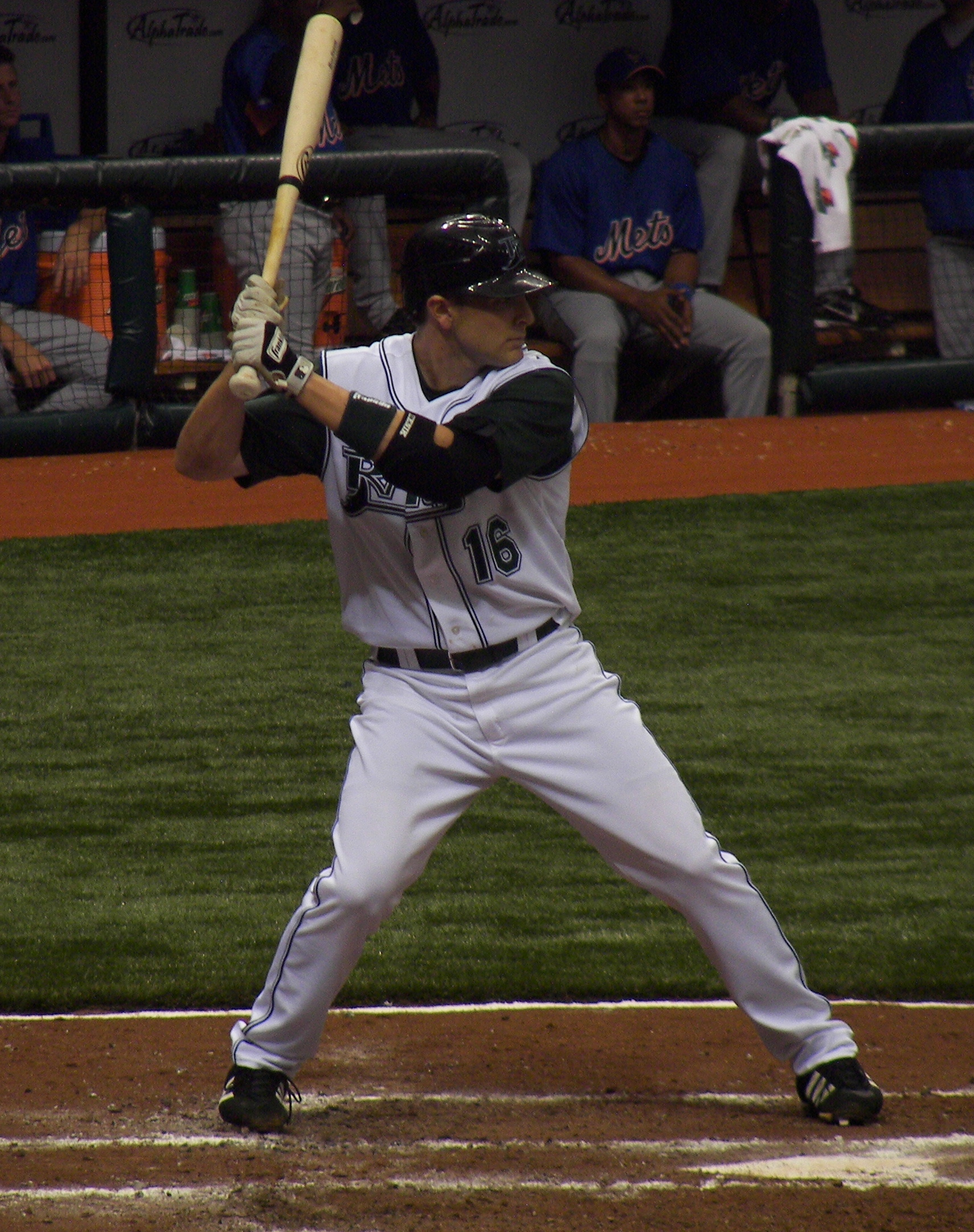
Harris batting for the Tampa Bay Devil Rays in 2007

Harris was sold to the Tampa Bay Devil Rays on January 2, 2007, and spent the majority of the season as the Devil Rays' starting shortstop. In 137 games, he hit .286 with 12 home runs and 59 RBI. He was voted the Rays' Heart and Hustle Award winner at the end of the season.

=== Minnesota Twins ===
On November 28, 2007, the Rays traded Harris (along with Jason Pridie and Delmon Young) to the Minnesota Twins for Matt Garza, Jason Bartlett, and Eduardo Morlan.

Harris saw considerable playing time with the Twins in 2008, 2009, and 2010 as a utility player. He played shortstop, second base and third base and even a few games at first base. Harris also saw his first post-season action when the Twins faced the New York Yankees in the 2009 American League Division Series.

On October 11, 2009, Harris was the last Major League batter in Metrodome history as the Yankees defeated the Twins 4–1 in Game 3, eliminating the Twins from the playoffs.

Harris was the front-runner to start at third base for the Twins in 2010, but Nick Punto got the nod on Opening Day. Punto was later replaced by rookie Danny Valencia and on June 24, Harris was outrighted to Triple-A Rochester after a 5–0 loss to the Milwaukee Brewers.

In three seasons with the Twins, Harris hit .251 with 14 home runs and 90 RBI in 296 games. The Twins were Central Division Champions in 2009 and 2010.

=== Baltimore Orioles ===
On December 9, 2010, the Baltimore Orioles acquired Harris in a trade along with J. J. Hardy for minor-league pitchers Brett Jacobson and Jim Hoey. He spent the entire season in Triple-A with the Norfolk Tides and hit .225 with 10 homers and 50 RBI in 136 games. He became a free agent at the end of the season.

=== Colorado Rockies ===
Harris signed a minor league contract with the Colorado Rockies on January 6, 2012. He played for the Triple-A Colorado Springs Sky Sox and hit .317 with nine homers and 63 RBI in 106 games.

=== Los Angeles Angels of Anaheim ===
On November 15, 2012, Harris signed a Minor League contract with an invitation to Spring Training with the Los Angeles Angels of Anaheim. He made the Angels' Opening Day roster as a utility player, and hit .206 with four home runs and 9 RBI in 44 games for the Angels, while playing shortstop, second base, third base, first base and left field. The Angels designated Harris for assignment on July 20, 2013, and he elected free agency three days later.

=== New York Yankees ===
Harris signed a minor league deal with the New York Yankees on July 26, 2013. He played in 22 games for the Triple-A Scranton/Wilkes-Barre RailRiders, where he hit .233 with a home run and 4 RBI. He was released on August 20.

=== Texas Rangers ===
Harris signed a minor league deal with the Texas Rangers one day later, on August 21. With the Round Rock Express, he appeared in 12 games and batted .244 with two home runs and 5 RBI.

=== Los Angeles Dodgers ===
Harris signed a minor league contract with the Los Angeles Dodgers on November 18, 2013, that included an invitation to spring training. He played in six games for the Triple-A Albuquerque Isotopes and had five hits in 15 at-bats (.333) with an RBI before he was released on April 12, 2014.

=== Long Island Ducks ===
On May 16, 2014, Harris signed with the Long Island Ducks of the Atlantic League of Professional Baseball. He became a free agent following the season. In 111 games he hit .286/.394/.396 with 8 home runs, 53 RBIs and 1 stolen base.

=== Detroit Tigers ===
On March 17, 2015, Harris signed a minor league contract with the Detroit Tigers. He was released on June 29, 2015.

== Post-playing career ==
In February 2016, Harris was hired by the Los Angeles Angels to join their player development department. In May 2016, he enrolled in the MBA for Executives program at The Wharton School of the University of Pennsylvania. He resides in Tennessee.

In November 2019, Harris was hired by x10 Capital, a private equity firm based in San Francisco, CA.
