= Tim Byrdak =

American baseball player (born 1973)

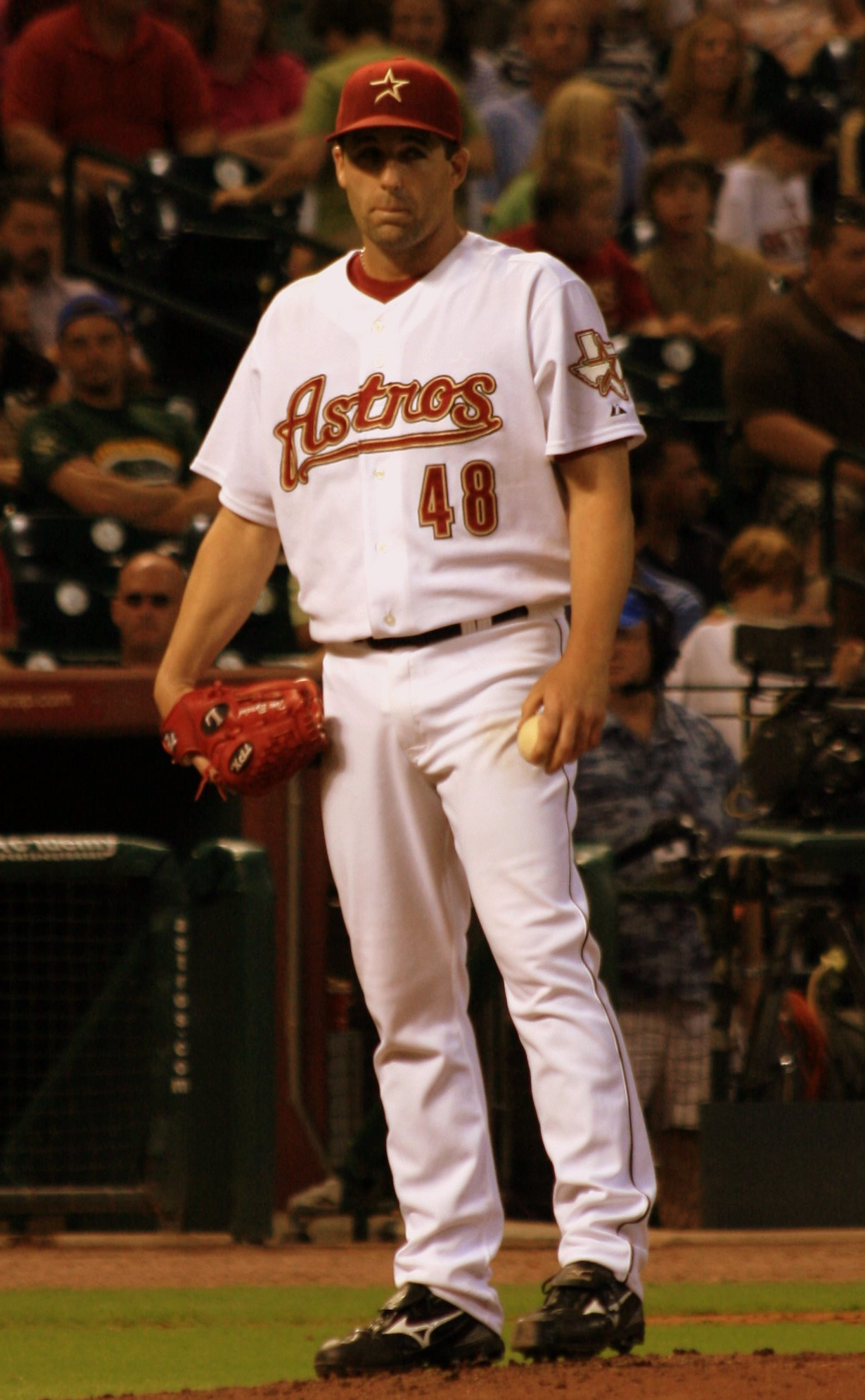
- Byrdak with the Houston Astros in 2009
- Relief pitcher
- Born: October 31, 1973 (age 52); Oak Lawn, Illinois, U.S.
- Batted: Left Threw: Left

MLB debut
- August 7, 1998, for the Kansas City Royals

Last MLB appearance
- September 26, 2013, for the New York Mets

MLB statistics
- Win–loss record: 13–13
- Earned run average: 4.35
- Strikeouts: 326
- Stats at Baseball Reference

Teams
- Kansas City Royals (1998–2000); Baltimore Orioles (2005–2006); Detroit Tigers (2007); Houston Astros (2008–2010); New York Mets (2011–2013)

Timothy Christopher Byrdak (born October 31, 1973) is an American former professional baseball pitcher. He has pitched for the Kansas City Royals, Baltimore Orioles, Detroit Tigers, Houston Astros and New York Mets of Major League Baseball (MLB). A relief pitcher, Byrdak attended Rice University where he played college baseball.

== Career ==
=== Kansas City Royals ===
Byrdak was drafted by the Kansas City Royals in the fifth round of the 1994 MLB draft out of Rice University. He made his MLB debut as a reliever against the New York Yankees on August 7, 1998. In parts of three seasons with the Royals, he was 0–4 with an 8.27 ERA in 48 games. However, he did pick up his first career save on July 4, 1999, against the Cleveland Indians.

=== Cleveland Indians ===
He signed as a minor league free agent with the Indians on February 19, 2001. He only appeared in four games with the AAA Buffalo Bisons in 2001 and 11 with the Kinston Indians and Akron Aeros in 2002 due to injury issues.

=== Northern League ===
In 2003, he pitched in the Northern League with the Gary Southshore Railcats and the Joliet Jackhammers.

While playing for the Rail Cats, he faced 77-year-old Minnie Miñoso leading off the game at St. Paul on July 16, 2003, and got a walk. The plate appearance marked Minoso's seventh decade of professional baseball, and Byrdak was quoted in the "Scorecard" section of Sports Illustrated on his impressions on facing the former White Sox star.

=== San Diego Padres ===
He signed as a minor league free agent with the San Diego Padres on January 30, 2004, and made 20 appearances for the AAA Portland Beavers, where he was 3–0 with a 5.45 ERA.

=== Baltimore Orioles ===
He was traded to the Baltimore Orioles on June 22, 2004, and pitched for the Ottawa Lynx in 2004 and 2005. Byrdak made his first appearance in the Majors in five years when the Orioles purchased his contract and he appeared against the Indians on July 2, 2005. He made 57 appearances for the Orioles Major League team in 2005 and 2006, with a 1–1 record and 5.88 ERA.

=== Detroit Tigers ===
He signed as a free agent with the Detroit Tigers on November 17, 2006. Prior to the 2007 season, Byrdak developed a forkball, a type of pitch that he had previously not thrown. This enabled him to throw three pitches (along with a fastball and curveball).

In his Detroit debut, Byrdak struck out five of six batters in the heart of the powerful Boston Red Sox lineup, including an inning-ending curve to which David Ortiz struck out looking. He pitched in 39 games for the Tigers, and was 3–0 with a 3.20 ERA.

=== Houston Astros ===
He signed as a free agent with the Houston Astros on April 3, 2008. In three seasons with the Astros, he was 5–5 with a 3.53 ERA in 199 appearances.

On September 28, 2010, Byrdak surrendered a walk-off home run to Cincinnati Reds right fielder Jay Bruce that clinched the Reds the National League Central division title.

=== New York Mets ===
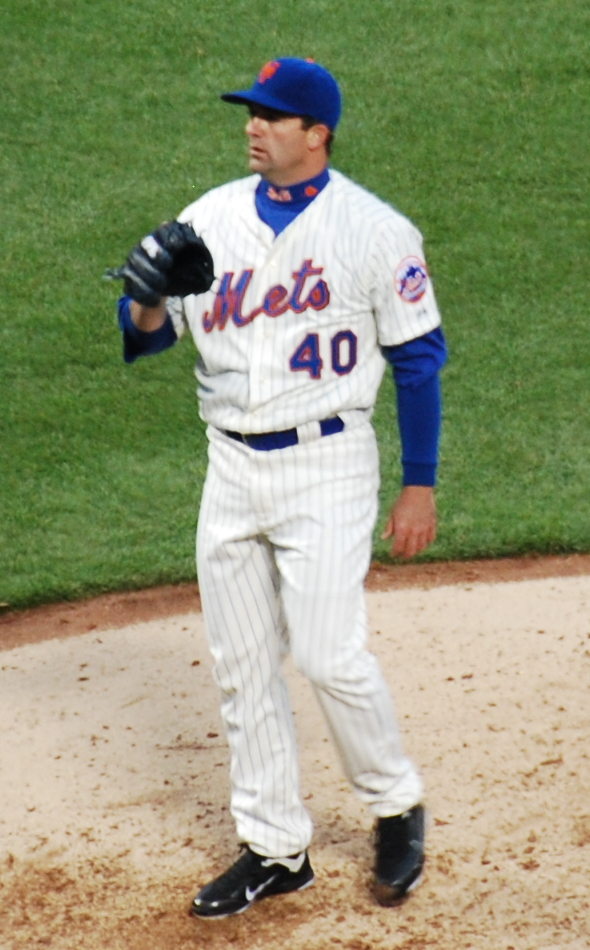
Byrdak during his tenure with the New York Mets in 2011

On January 21, 2011, Byrdak signed with the New York Mets. That season, he had a 2–1 record and 3.82 ERA. Despite some discussion about a possible trade, He was re-signed following the season.

Byrdak had surgery to repair a torn meniscus on March 13, 2012. He was scheduled to miss six weeks. However, on Opening Day, April 5, 2012, Byrdak made his season debut and struck out the only two batters he faced, preserving the Mets 1–0 victory. Through June 16 he had a 2–0 record and 3.44 ERA.

Between May 6 and May 22, 2012, Byrdak appeared in 12 games and retired the only batter he faced in all 12 appearances. These included 5 strikeouts, 1 ground out, and 6 fly outs. This is tied for the third longest streak of games appeared in without allowing a base runner.

On August 6, 2012, it was announced that Byrdak had suffered an anterior capsule injury in his left shoulder. He did not pitch at all for the rest of the season.

On November 26, 2012, Byrdak re-signed with the Mets on a minor league deal with an invitation to spring training.

== Personal life ==
Aside from major league baseball Byrdak works at Tyler Thompson's Elite Sports Facility in Lockport, IL and gives pitching lessons. Tim is married with four children and resides in Lockport, Illinois during the off-season.

Former Pitching coach for Providence Catholic High School in New Lenox, IL. The Celtics hold the record for most IHSA State Championships in baseball.
