= Chris Schwinden =

American baseball player (born 1986)

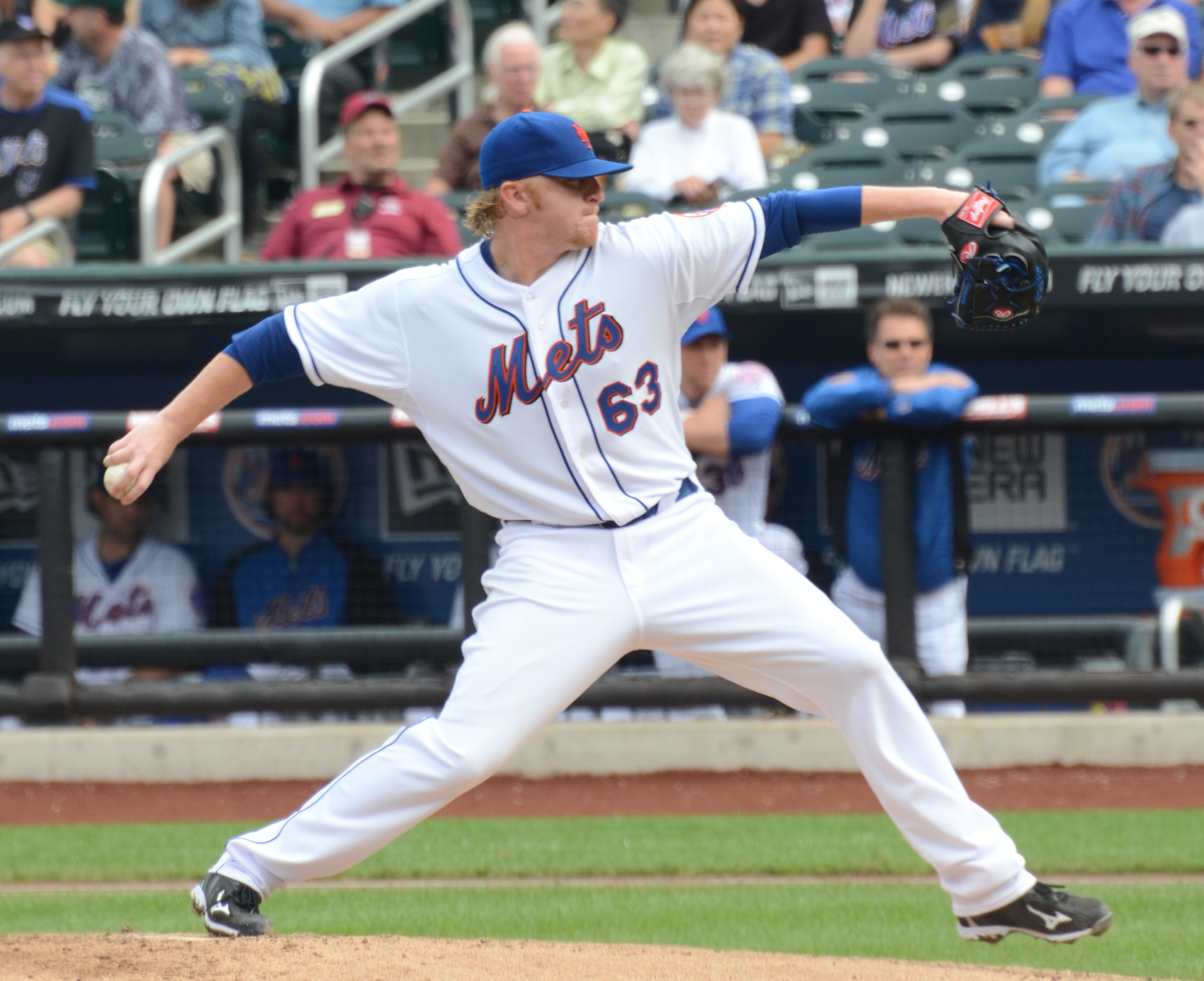
- Schwinden with the New York Mets
- Pitcher
- Born: September 22, 1986 (age 39); Visalia, California, U.S.
- Batted: Right Threw: Right

MLB debut
- September 8, 2011, for the New York Mets

Last MLB appearance
- May 30, 2012, for the New York Mets

MLB statistics
- Win–loss record: 0–3
- Earned run average: 6.98
- Strikeouts: 18
- Stats at Baseball Reference

Teams
- New York Mets (2011–2012)

Christopher Anthony Schwinden (born September 22, 1986) is an American former professional baseball pitcher. He played in parts of two seasons in Major League Baseball (MLB) for the New York Mets.

== Professional career ==
Schwinden was drafted by the Detroit Tigers in the 43rd round of the 2004 Major League Baseball draft out of Golden West High School in Visalia, California, however he did not sign and attended and played baseball at Lewis–Clark State College (Idaho) in 2007; he then attended Fresno Pacific University in 2008.

=== New York Mets ===
Schwinden was drafted by the New York Mets in the 22nd round, with the 674th overall selection, of the 2008 Major League Baseball draft.

He was called up to the majors for the first time on September 5, 2011, after a stellar season for the Triple-A Buffalo Bisons. Schwinden began the season with the Double-A Binghamton Mets but made the most of a spot start on April 17 to secure a spot in the Triple-A rotation. From there, he led the Bisons in starts (26), innings pitched (145 2/3), ERA (3.95), and strikeouts (134) while tying for the team lead with eight wins and being named to the Triple-A All-Star team. Schwinden's 134 strikeouts were the third-most in a single season by a Bisons pitcher in the modern era.

On April 26, 2012, Schwinden was recalled to the Mets to replace Robert Carson on the roster and Mike Pelfrey in the rotation. Schwinden had gone 2–2 with a 2.05 ERA and a complete game in 4 starts with Buffalo. In three appearances (two starts) for the Mets, he struggled to an 0-1 record and 12.46 ERA with one strikeout across 8 2/3 innings pitched. Schwinden was designated for assignment by the Mets on June 1.

=== Toronto Blue Jays ===
On June 2, 2012, Schwinden was claimed off waivers by the Toronto Blue Jays. He made one start for the Triple-A Las Vegas 51s, taking the loss after allowing eight runs on eight hits with two strikeouts over three innings.

=== Cleveland Indians ===
On June 6, 2012, Schwinden was claimed off of waivers by the Cleveland Indians. He was subsequently assigned to the Triple-A Columbus Clippers of the International League, for whom he made three starts, in which he logged a 1-2 record and 5.87 ERA with five strikeouts across 15 1/3 innings pitched. On June 27, the Indians designated Schwinden for assignment following the acquisition of Vinny Rottino.

=== New York Yankees ===
On June 29, 2012, Schwinden was claimed off waivers by the New York Yankees. He made one start for the Triple-A Scranton/Wilkes-Barre RailRiders, taking the loss after allowing four runs on eight hits with two strikeouts over four innings pitched. Schwinden was designated for assignment by the Yankees following the acquisition of Darnell McDonald on July 4.

=== New York Mets (second stint) ===
On July 5, 2012, Schwinden was claimed off waivers by the New York Mets. On July 10, Schwinden was removed from the 40-man roster and sent outright to the Triple-A Buffalo Bisons.

Schwinden spent the entirety of the 2013 campaign in Triple-A, now with the Las Vegas 51s. In 29 appearances (28 starts) for Las Vegas, he compiled a 6-9 record and 5.78 ERA with 89 strikeouts across 146 1/3 innings pitched. Schwinden was released by the Mets organization on March 24, 2014.

=== Texas Rangers ===
On May 17, 2014, Schwinden signed a minor league contract with the Texas Rangers. In three starts for the Triple-A Round Rock Express, he struggled to a 1-2 record and 11.25 ERA with 11 strikeouts over 12 innings of work. Schwinden was released by the Rangers organization on June 9.

=== Lancaster Barnstormers ===
Schwinden spent the majority of the 2014 season with the Lancaster Barnstormers of the Atlantic League of Professional Baseball. He was named the Atlantic League Pitcher of the Year after throwing sixteen quality starts and winning nine of his first twelve starts en route to an Atlantic League championship. Schwinden left baseball on a high note as he retired following the 2014 season. In 25 starts for Lancaster, he had logged a 2.57 ERA with 105 strikeouts across 164 2/3 innings pitched.
