= Jason Pridie =

American baseball player (born 1983)

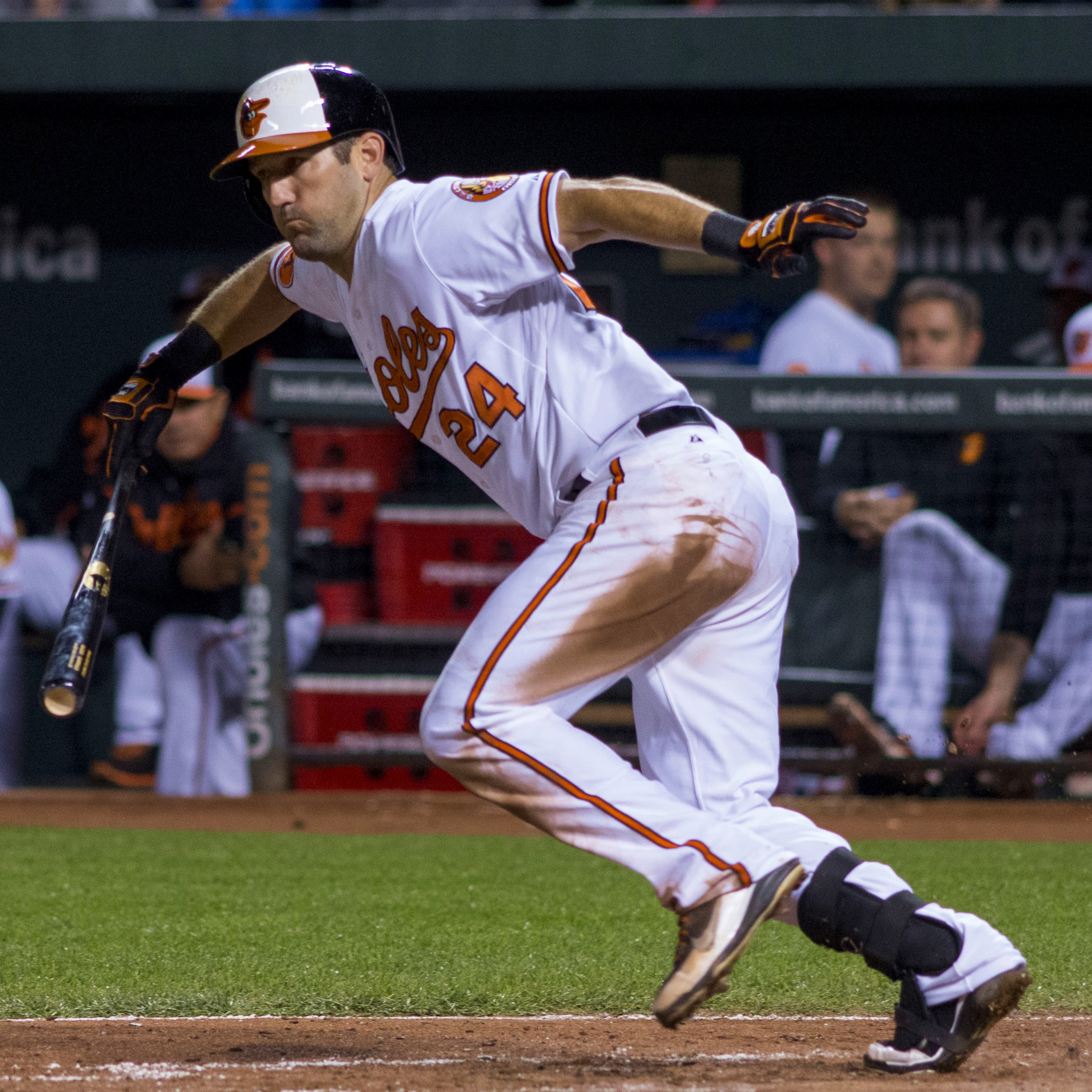
- Pridie with the Baltimore Orioles in 2013
- Outfielder
- Born: October 9, 1983 (age 43); Phoenix, Arizona, U.S.
- Batted: Left Threw: Right

MLB debut
- September 3, 2008, for the Minnesota Twins

Last MLB appearance
- September 29, 2015, for the Oakland Athletics

MLB statistics
- Batting average: .216
- Home runs: 5
- Runs batted in: 24

NPB statistics
- Batting average: .230
- Home runs: 9
- Runs batted in: 40
- Stats at Baseball Reference

Teams
- Minnesota Twins (2008–2009); New York Mets (2011); Philadelphia Phillies (2012); Baltimore Orioles (2013); Colorado Rockies (2014); Oakland Athletics (2015); Hiroshima Toyo Carp (2016)

Jason Orville Pridie (born October 9, 1983) is an American former professional baseball outfielder. He played in Major League Baseball (MLB) with the Minnesota Twins, New York Mets, Philadelphia Phillies, Baltimore Orioles, Colorado Rockies, and Oakland Athletics, and in Nippon Professional Baseball (NPB) for the Hiroshima Toyo Carp.

== Baseball career ==
=== Tampa Bay Rays ===
Pridie was drafted out of Prescott High School, where he hit a record-setting 13 triples, by the Tampa Bay Devil Rays in the second round (43rd overall) of the 2002 Major League Baseball draft. After signing with the Devil Rays, Pridie was assigned to play with the Rookie-level Princeton Devil Rays. In 67 games, he batted.368 with seven home runs and 33 RBI. Pridie was promoted on August 28, 2002, to the Hudson Valley Renegades, the Devil Rays' Single-A team. He finished the season there and batted.344 with a home run in eight games. Baseball America named Pridie to the Rookie League All-Star team and also rated him as the best hitter and the best tools player in the Devil Rays' organization.

In 2003 and 2004, Pridie played the entire two seasons with the Single-A Charleston RiverDogs. Playing in 128 games during both seasons, Pridie hit.260 with seven home runs and 48 RBI in 2003 and .276 with 17 home runs and 86 RBI in 2004. Pridie was also rated by Baseball America as the best defensive outfielder in the Rays' organization. In 2005, he began the season with the Single-A Visalia Oaks. He played just one game before being on the disabled list for three and a half months from April 9 to July 26. Immediately upon being activated from the disabled list, he was promoted to the Double-A Montgomery Biscuits. He finished the season for the Biscuits and played in 28 games for them, batting .213 with three home runs and 8 RBI.

On December 8, 2005, the Minnesota Twins selected Pridie in the Rule 5 draft. Without enough roster room for Pridie, the Twins sent him back to the Rays on March 29, 2006. In the 2006 season, Pridie played in 132 games and batted .230 with five home runs and 34 RBI with the Biscuits. He also began the 2007 season in Double-A, playing in 71 games and batted .290 with four home runs and 27 RBI. After Dustan Mohr's promotion to the Devil Rays on June 27, Pridie was sent to the Triple-A Durham Bulls to take his roster spot. He finished the season with the Bulls, posting a .318 batting average with 10 home runs and 39 RBI in 63 games. While in Durham, Pridie was the focal point of an unofficial Bulls fanclub named "Pridie's Pack."

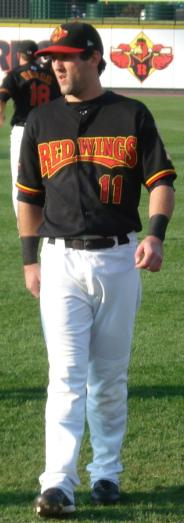
Pridie during his tenure with the Rochester Red Wings, Triple-A affiliates of the Minnesota Twins, in 2008

=== Minnesota Twins ===
On November 20, 2007, the Rays purchased Pridie's contract, protecting him from the Rule 5 draft. Eight days later, the Rays traded Pridie along with Delmon Young and Brendan Harris to the Minnesota Twins for Matt Garza, Jason Bartlett, and Eduardo Morlan.

Pridie began the 2008 season with the Twins' Triple-A Rochester Red Wings. On July 12, he hit a go-ahead grand slam in the top of the ninth, and another go-ahead solo home run in the top of the 13th inning to give the Red Wings a 9–8 win at Durham.

On September 2, 2008, Pridie was promoted to the Twins as part of the team's September call-ups. He made his major league debut on September 3 against the Toronto Blue Jays as a pinch runner for Delmon Young, and later scored on a Joe Mauer double. He remained in the game in right field, and committed a game-tying error with two outs in the ninth inning, allowing the game (eventually won by the Jays) to go into extra innings. He remained with the club for the rest of the season, but did not have a hit in six plate appearances.

Pridie batted .265 with nine home runs and 53 RBI in 121 games for the Red Wings in 2009. His only major league appearance in 2009 was as a pinch runner against the Houston Astros on June 20.

=== New York Mets ===
On February 9, 2010, Pridie was claimed off waivers by the New York Mets. The Mets purchased his contract on April 22, 2011, when starting center fielder Angel Pagan was placed on the 15-day disabled list. On April 23, Pridie collected his first major league hit off Diamondbacks pitcher Barry Enright. The very next day, he hit a three-run home run, the first of his career, off Armando Galarraga. For the season, Pridie hit .231 with four home runs and 20 RBI in 101 games. After the season, he was outrighted to Triple-A Buffalo, but elected free agency.

=== Oakland Athletics ===
The Oakland Athletics signed Pridie to a minor league contract with an invitation to spring training on November 15, 2011. On March 9, 2012, Pridie was suspended for 50 games for violating the minor league drug-testing policy by testing positive for a drug of abuse. He was granted free agency on June 4.

=== Philadelphia Phillies ===
On June 15, the Philadelphia Phillies signed Pridie to a minor league contract, and assigned him to the Triple-A Lehigh Valley IronPigs. After batting .370 in 13 games with Lehigh Valley, Pridie was called up to Philadelphia to fill the roster spot vacated by Jim Thome on June 30. He hit his first home run with the Phillies on July 8 against the Atlanta Braves. Pridie was designated for assignment by the Phillies on July 22. On October 6, he elected free agency.

=== Baltimore Orioles ===
In October 2012, Pridie signed a minor league deal with the Baltimore Orioles for the 2013 season. The Orioles purchased Pridie's contract from the Triple-A Norfolk Tides on September 25 when Manny Machado was placed on the 60-day disabled list. After the season, Pridie was non-tendered by Baltimore, becoming a free agent.

=== Colorado Rockies ===
Pridie signed a minor league deal with the Colorado Rockies on December 5, 2013. He was designated for assignment on August 6, 2014. Pridie elected free agency on October 12, 2014.

=== Oakland Athletics ===
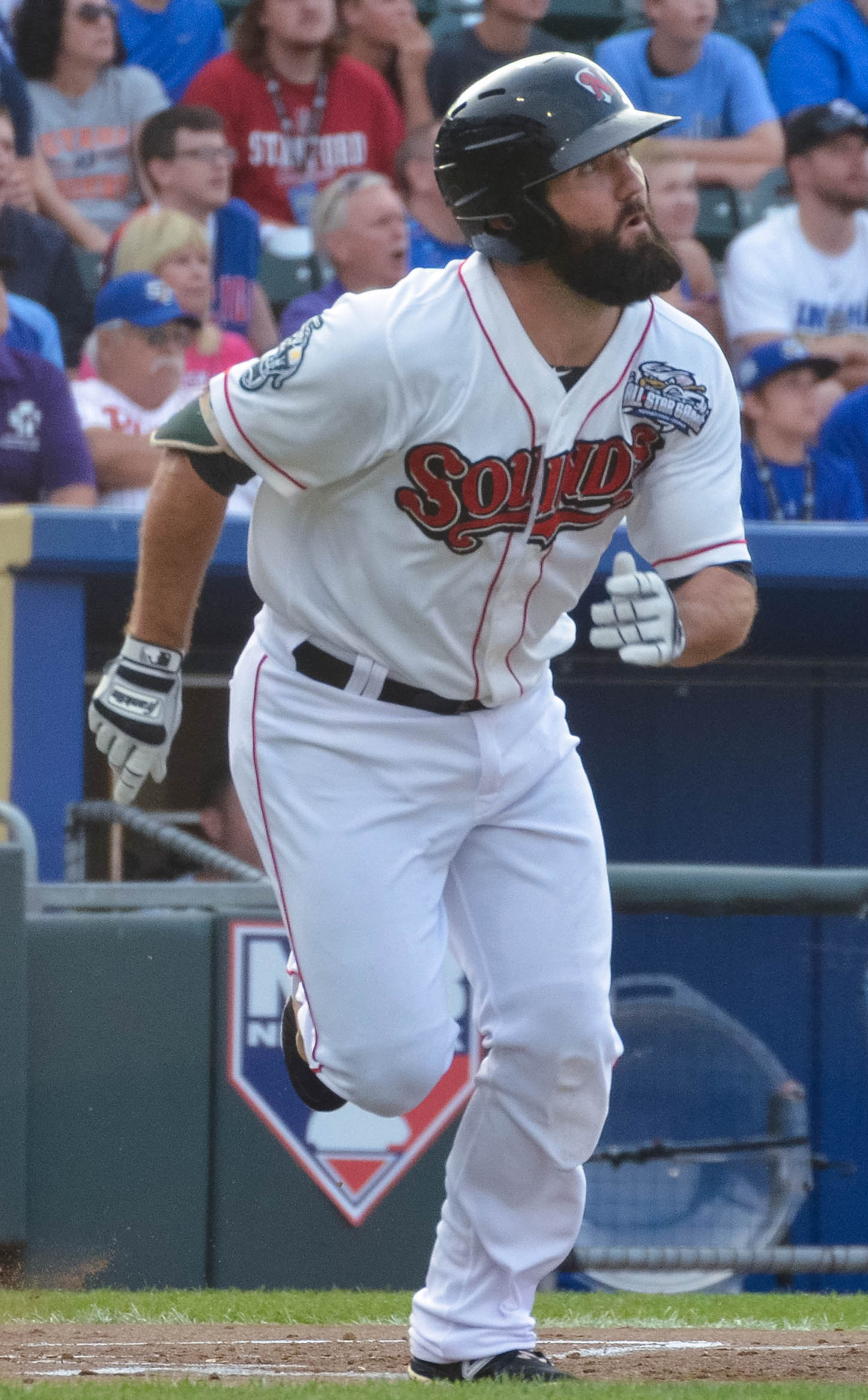
Pridie representing the Nashville Sounds at the 2015 Triple-A All-Star Game

Pridie signed a minor league deal with the Oakland Athletics on January 10, 2015. He played the majority of the 2015 season with the Triple-A Nashville Sounds, but played six games for Oakland (0-for-9, one BB) after being called up to the major league club on September 1. He was released on October 19 in order to pursue an opportunity to play in Japan.

=== Hiroshima Toyo Carp ===
Prior to the 2016 season, Pridie signed with the Hiroshima Toyo Carp of Nippon Professional Baseball. He played in 89 games with the Carp, batting .230 with nine home runs and 40 RBI.

=== Arizona Diamondbacks ===
Pridie signed a minor league deal with the Arizona Diamondbacks on December 9, 2016. He was released on March 29, 2017.

=== Pericos de Puebla ===
On May 7, 2017, Pridie signed with the Pericos de Puebla of the Mexican League. He was released on May 15.
