= 2009 New York Mets season =

2009 New York Mets
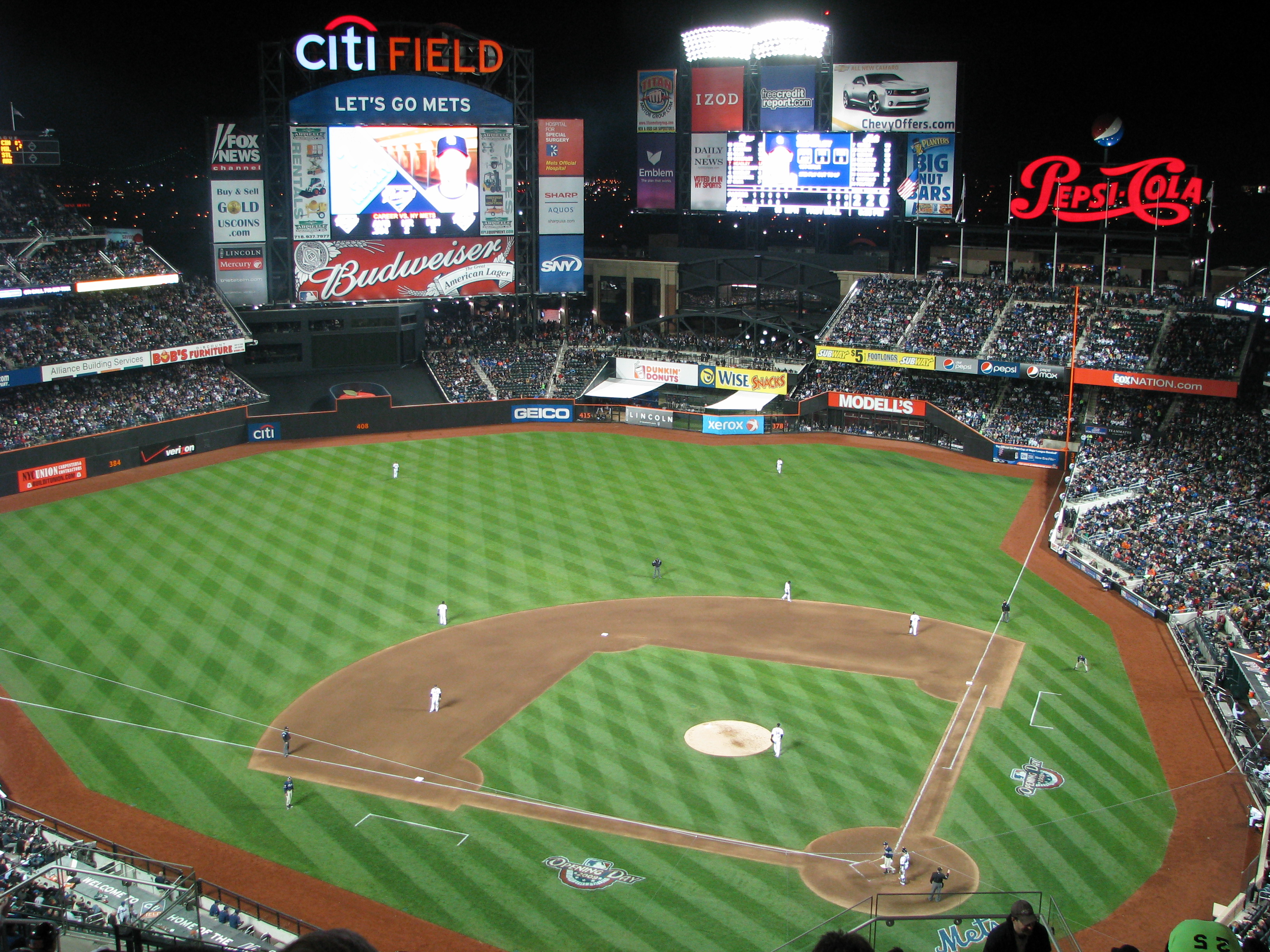
- The first regular season game ever played at Citi Field on April 13, 2009.
- League: National League
- Division: East
- Ballpark: Citi Field
- City: New York, New York
- Record: 70–92 (.432)
- Divisional place: 4th
- Owners: Fred Wilpon
- General manager: Omar Minaya
- Manager: Jerry Manuel
- Television: SportsNet New York; WPIX (CW affiliate); Gary Cohen, Ralph Kiner, Keith Hernandez, Ron Darling, Bob Ojeda
- Radio: WFAN (English); Howie Rose, Wayne Hagin, Ed Coleman

The 2009 New York Mets season was the franchise's 48th season and the team's first year at Citi Field, which opened on April 13 against the San Diego Padres. The Mets finished with a 70–92 record, as the season was plagued by many injuries. This was the Mets' first losing season since 2004.

== Offseason ==
Looking to improve the bullpen after the struggles of the 2008 season, the Mets signed closer Francisco Rodríguez to a three-year, $37 million contract on December 10, 2008. Immediately after, the team acquired reliever J. J. Putz from the Seattle Mariners in a three team trade involving the Mariners and the Cleveland Indians, giving the Mets a setup man for Rodriguez. New York shipped reliever Aaron Heilman, outfielder Endy Chávez, pitcher Jason Vargas and three minor leaguers to Seattle for Putz, center fielder Jeremy Reed and reliever Sean Green, while Mets reliever Joe Smith was acquired by Cleveland.

On December 12, the Mets traded Scott Schoeneweis to the Arizona Diamondbacks for Connor Robertson. On January 12, 2009, the Mets signed RHP Tim Redding to a one-year contract. The Mets signed Alex Cora to a one-year, $2 million contract. Garcia's contract, which was full of incentives, could have reached $8 million if he reached the major league roster. On April 3, the Mets signed outfielder Gary Sheffield after being released by the Detroit Tigers.

=== Roster ===
2009 New York Mets
Roster
Pitchers: 35 Lance Broadway; 64 Elmer Dessens; 25 Pedro Feliciano; 27 Nelson Figueroa; 47 Casey Fossum; 50 Sean Green; 61 Liván Hernández; 33 John Maine; 48 Patrick Misch; 49 Jon Niese; 38 Fernando Nieve; 36 Darren O'Day; 39 Bobby Parnell; 34 Mike Pelfrey; 46 Óliver Pérez; 22 J. J. Putz; 44 Tim Redding; 75 Francisco Rodríguez; 57 Johan Santana; 43 Brian Stokes; 29 Tobi Stoner; 56 Jon Switzer; 36 Ken Takahashi; 13 Billy Wagner	Catchers: 11 Ramón Castro; 9 Omir Santos; 23 Brian Schneider; 30 Josh Thole; 99 Robinson Cancel; Infielders: 4 Ángel Berroa; 1 Luis Castillo; 3 Alex Cora; 21 Carlos Delgado; 29 Andy Green; 11 Anderson Hernández; 6 Ramón Martínez; 28 Daniel Murphy; 11 Argenis Reyes; 7 José Reyes; 4 Wilson Valdéz; 5 David Wright; Outfielders: 15 Carlos Beltrán; 29 Emil Brown; 19 Ryan Church; 6 Nick Evans; 12 Jeff Francoeur; 26 Fernando Martínez; 16 Ángel Pagán; 18 Jeremy Reed; 10 Gary Sheffield; 19 Cory Sullivan; Utility player: 9 Marlon Anderson; 17 Fernando Tatís	Manager: 53 Jerry Manuel; Coaches: 51 Luis Alicea (first base); 58 Sandy Alomar Jr. (catching); 2 Sandy Alomar Sr. (bench); 20 Howard Johnson (hitting); 55 Randy Niemann (bullpen); 52 Razor Shines (third base); 59 Dan Warthen (pitching)

== Regular season ==
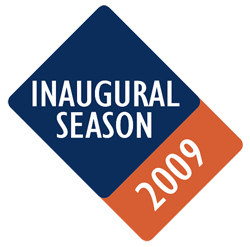
Patch worn on the right sleeve during home games the 2009 season.

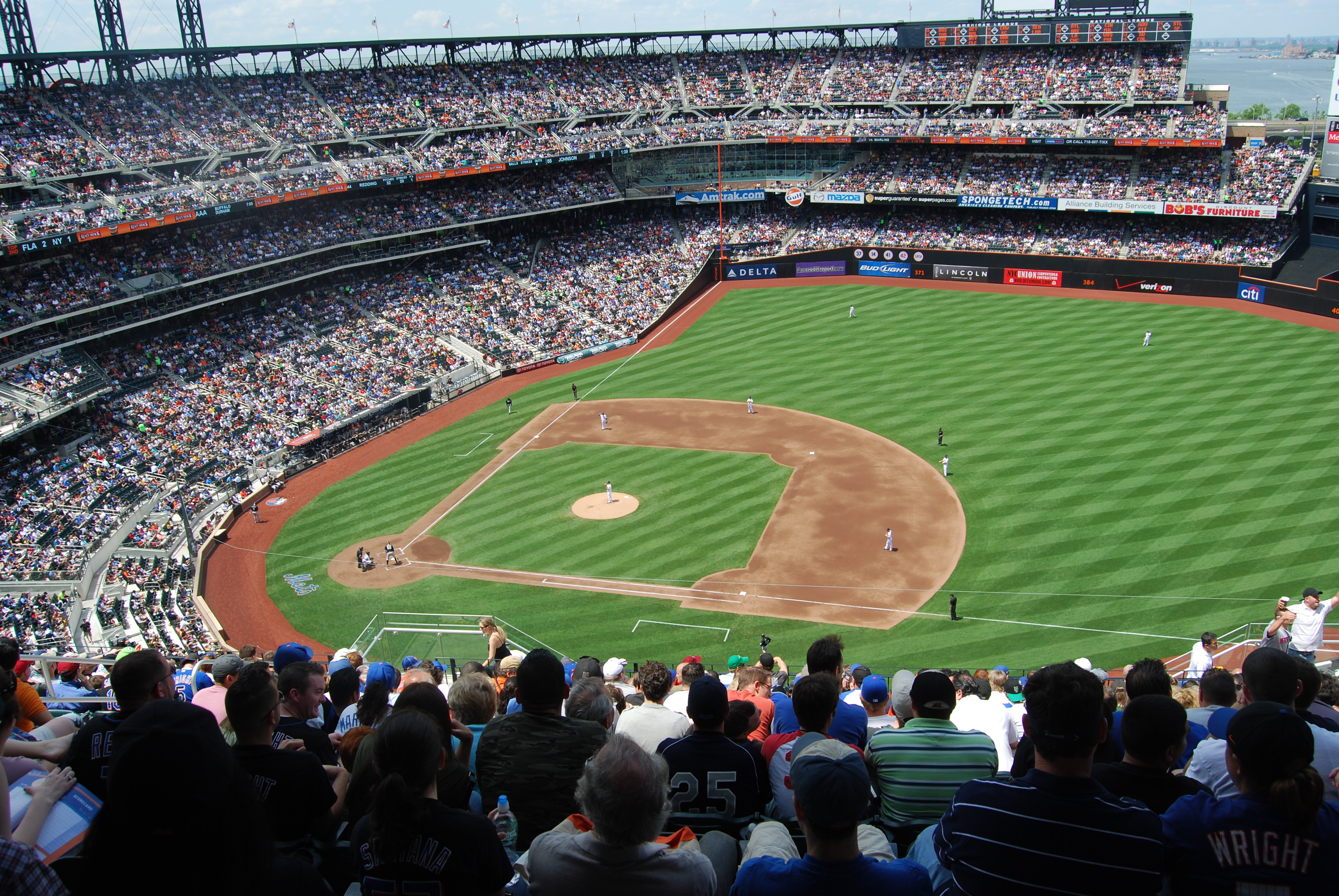
In its opening season, Citi Field drew over 3.1 million fans with a game average of 92.7% of seats filled, 4th best in baseball.

The Mets opened up the season in Cincinnati against the Cincinnati Reds on April 6. The Mets collected the victory, improving their win–loss record on Opening Day. The first ever home game at Citi Field was on April 13 against the San Diego Padres, who spoiled the opener with a 6–5 win against the Mets. In that game, Jody Gerut of the Padres became the first player to open a new ballpark with a leadoff home run.

On April 17, Gary Sheffield hit his 500th home run against the Milwaukee Brewers. On May 10, José Reyes stole his 300th base against the Pittsburgh Pirates. Despite an injury depleted roster, the Mets finished May with a 19–9 record and trailed the Philadelphia Phillies by a half game for the NL East lead.

After finishing April and May with a combined record of 28–21, injuries hurt the Mets in June and they went 9–18, their worst month since September 2003, but lost only 2 1/2 games in the standings, as the Phillies were having their own struggles. Injuries continued to hurt them Mets in July, as they went 12–14, quickly falling to 4th place in the National League East.

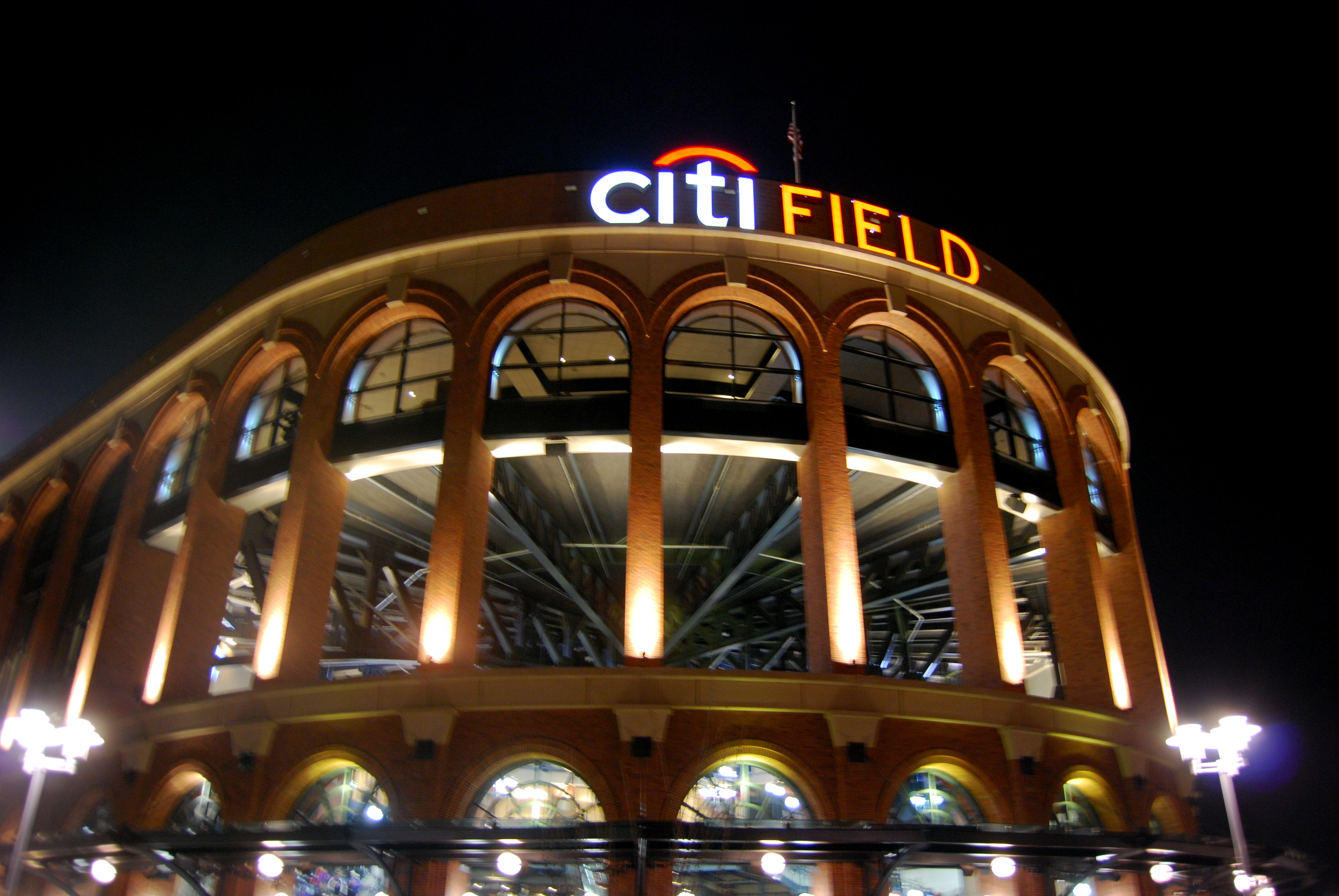
Citi Field, the Mets new stadium.

On July 10, the Mets sent outfielder Ryan Church to the Atlanta Braves for outfielder Jeff Francoeur.

However, the Mets did set a team record during the 2009 season. They had a team-record 10 hits in the fourth inning on August 18 against the Atlanta Braves. They scored eight runs in that inning, on their way to a 9–4 victory.

On August 23, the Mets became the first team in National League history to fall victim to a game-ending unassisted triple play, turned by Eric Bruntlett of the Philadelphia Phillies at Citi Field in the bottom of the 9th inning.

The 2009 Mets season will be remembered as a season marred by injuries. On August 25, it was announced that ace Johan Santana would undergo season-ending elbow surgery on his pitching elbow, and was added to the long list of injured players. Including Santana, the Mets' had 20 players see time on the disabled list at some point during the 2009 season, including David Wright, John Maine, Jon Niese, Fernando Nieve, J. J. Putz, Billy Wagner, Brian Schneider, Carlos Delgado, Ángel Pagán, Gary Sheffield, Óliver Pérez, Ryan Church, Ramón Martínez, José Reyes, Alex Cora, Carlos Beltrán, and Fernando Martinez. Mets players spent more than 1,480 days in the DL in 2009, more than any other team in the majors. However, second-half turnarounds of Francoeur and Daniel Murphy helped the Mets finish the season with the best batting average in the National League, tied with the Los Angeles Dodgers.

On August 25, the Mets traded former all-star closer Billy Wagner to the Boston Red Sox for minor league outfielder Chris Carter and minor league first baseman Eddie Loria. The Mets finished with a 70–92 record and 4th place in the NL East, missing the playoffs for the third straight year.

=== Season standings ===
NL East
Team	W	L	Pct.	GB	Home	Road
Philadelphia Phillies	93	69	.574	—	45‍–‍36	48‍–‍33
Florida Marlins	87	75	.537	6	43‍–‍38	44‍–‍37
Atlanta Braves	86	76	.531	7	40‍–‍41	46‍–‍35
New York Mets	70	92	.432	23	41‍–‍40	29‍–‍52
Washington Nationals	59	103	.364	34	33‍–‍48	26‍–‍55

=== Record vs. opponents ===
2009 National League record Source: MLB Standings Grid – 2009
Team	AZ	ATL	CHC	CIN	COL	FLA	HOU	LAD	MIL	NYM	PHI	PIT	SD	SF	STL	WAS	AL
Arizona	–	3–4	4-2	1–5	7-11	5–3	5–4	7-11	2–5	5–2	1–5	6–1	11-7	5-13	2–4	1–5	5–10
Atlanta	4–3	–	4–2	3–6	4–4	8-10	3-3	4–3	3–3	13–5	10-8	3–4	3–3	3–4	4–2	10-8	7–8
Chicago	2-4	2–4	–	10-5	2–4	4–3	11–6	3–5	10-7	3-3	1–5	10-4	4–5	4-2	6-10	5–2	6–9
Cincinnati	5-1	6-3	5-10	–	0-7	3-3	12-4	1-5	8-7	2-4	2-5	13-5	1-6	3-3	8-8	3-4	6-9
Colorado	11-7	4-4	4-2	7-0	–	2-4	2-5	4-14	6-0	3-4	2-4	6-3	10-8	8-10	6-1	6-0	11-4
Florida	3-5	10-8	3-4	3-3	4-2	–	4–3	3-3	3-4	11-7	9-9	2-4	4-2	3-4	3-3	12-6	10-8
Houston	4–5	3-3	6-11	4-12	5-2	3-4	–	4–3	5-10	1-5	6-2	10-5	6-1	2-4	6-9	3-3	6-9
Los Angeles	11-7	3-4	5-3	5-1	14-4	3-3	3-4	–	3–3	5-1	4-3	4-3	10-8	11-7	2-5	3-2	9-9
Milwaukee	5-2	3-3	7-10	7-8	0-6	4-3	10-5	3-3	–	3-3	4-3	9-5	2-4	4-5	9-9	5-3	5-10
New York	2-5	5-13	3-3	4-2	4-3	7-11	5-1	1-5	3-3	–	6-12	4-3	2-5	5-3	4-5	10-8	5–10
Philadelphia	5-1	8-10	5-1	5-2	4-2	9-9	2-6	3-4	3-4	12-6	–	4-2	5-2	3-4	4-1	15-3	6-12
Pittsburgh	1-6	4-3	4-10	5-13	3-6	4-2	5-10	3-4	5-9	3-4	2-4	–	3-4	2-4	5-10	5-3	8–7
San Diego	7-11	3-3	5-4	6-1	8-10	2-4	1-6	8-10	4-2	5-2	2-5	4-3	–	10-8	1-6	4-2	5–10
San Francisco	13-5	4–3	2–4	3–3	10-8	4–3	4–2	7-11	5-4	3–5	4–3	4–2	8-10	–	4–3	4–2	9–6
St. Louis	4-2	2-4	10-6	8-8	1-6	3-3	9-6	5-2	9-9	5-4	1-4	10-5	6-1	3-4	–	6–1	9–6
Washington	5-1	8-10	2-5	4-3	0-6	6-12	3-3	2-3	3-5	8-10	3-15	3-5	2-4	2-4	1-6	–	7–11

=== Game log ===
2009 Game Log
April (9–12)

#	Date	Opponent	Score	Win	Loss	Save	Attendance	Record
1	April 6	@ Reds	2–1	Santana (1–0)	Harang (0–1)	Rodríguez (1)	42,177	1–0
2	April 8	@ Reds	9–7	Pelfrey (1–0)	Vólquez (0–1)	Rodríguez (2)	13,568	2–0
3	April 9	@ Reds	8–6	Arroyo (1–0)	Pérez (0–1)	Cordero (1)	17,837	2–1
4	April 10	@ Marlins	5–4	Lindstrom (1–0)	Feliciano (0–1)		24,070	2–2
5	April 11	@ Marlins	8–4	Hernández (1–0)	Nolasco (1–1)		39,412	3–2
6	April 12	@ Marlins	2–1	Johnson (2–0)	Santana (1–1)		18,109	3–3
7	April 13	Padres	6–5	Mujica (1–1)	Stokes (0–1)	Bell (4)	41,007	3–4
8	April 15	Padres	7–2	Pérez (1–1)	Correia (0–1)		35,581	4–4
9	April 16	Padres	6–5	Peavy (2–1)	Maine (0–1)	Bell (5)	35,985	4–5
10	April 17	Brewers	5–4	Putz (1–0)	McClung (0–1)		36,436	5–5
11	April 18	Brewers	1–0	Santana (2–1)	Villanueva (1–2)	Rodríguez (3)	36,312	6–5
12	April 19	Brewers	4–2	Suppan (1–2)	Figueroa (0–1)	Coffey (1)	36,124	6–6
13	April 21	@ Cardinals	6–4	Motte (1–1)	Putz (1–1)	Franklin (3)	35,506	6–7
14	April 22	@ Cardinals	5–2	Piñeiro (3–0)	Maine (0–2)	Franklin (4)	35,622	6–8
15	April 23	@ Cardinals	12–8	Lohse (3–0)	Hernández (1–1)		38,522	6–9
16	April 24	Nationals	4–3	Santana (3–1)	Olsen (0–3)	Rodríguez (4)	40,522	7–9
17	April 25	Nationals	8–2	Pelfrey (2–0)	Cabrera (0–2)		39,960	8–9
18	April 26	Nationals	8–1	Zimmermann (2–0)	Pérez (1–2)		40,023	8–10
19	April 27	Marlins	7–1	Maine (1–2)	Sánchez (1–2)		38,573	9–10
20	April 28	Marlins	7–4	Badenhop (1–0)	Green (0–1)	Lindstrom (4)	38,546	9–11
21	April 29	Marlins	4–3	Pinto (1–0)	Putz (1–2)	Lindstrom (5)	39,339	9–12

May (19–9)

#	Date	Opponent	Score	Win	Loss	Save	Attendance	Record
22	May 1	@ Phillies	7–4	Pelfrey (3–0)	Park (0–1)	Rodríguez (5)	44,773	10–12
23	May 2	@ Phillies	6–5 (10)	Taschner (1–0)	Green (0–2)		45,069	10–13
	May 3	@ Phillies	Postponed					
24	May 4	@ Braves	6–4	Maine (2–2)	Vázquez (2–3)	Rodríguez (6)	19,132	11–13
25	May 5	@ Braves	4–3	Hernández (2–1)	Kawakami (1–4)	Rodríguez (7)	21,049	12–13
26	May 6	Phillies	1–0	Santana (4–1)	Eyre (0–1)	Rodríguez (8)	37,600	13–13
27	May 7	Phillies	7–5	Pelfrey (4–0)	Moyer (3–2)	Rodríguez (9)	37,295	14–13
28	May 8	Pirates	7–3	Parnell (1–0)	Yates (0–2)		38,496	15–13
29	May 9	Pirates	10–1	Maine (3–2)	Maholm (3–1)		39,769	16–13
30	May 10	Pirates	8–4	Hernández (3–1)	Snell (1–5)		39,871	17–13
31	May 11	Braves	8–3	Lowe (5–1)	Santana (4–2)		40,497	17–14
32	May 12	Braves	4–3 (10)	Rodríguez (1–0)	Bennett (0–1)		39,408	18–14
33	May 13	Braves	8–7 (12)	Bennett (1–1)	Takahashi (0–1)	González (6)	40,555	18–15
34	May 14	@ Giants	7–4	Parnell (2–0)	Wilson (2–1)	Rodríguez (10)	30,154	19–15
35	May 15	@ Giants	8–6	Stokes (1–1)	Wilson (2–2)	Rodríguez (11)	41,684	20–15
36	May 16	@ Giants	9–6	Santana (5–2)	Johnson (3–4)	Putz (1)	41,336	21–15
37	May 17	@ Giants	2–0	Cain (4–1)	Pelfrey (4–1)	Wilson (9)	43,012	21–16
38	May 18	@ Dodgers	3–2 (11)	Troncoso (1–0)	Stokes (1–2)		37,136	21–17
39	May 19	@ Dodgers	5–3	Billingsley (6–1)	Maine (3–3)	Broxton (10)	37,857	21–18
40	May 20	@ Dodgers	2–1	Leach (1–0)	Putz (1–3)	Broxton (11)	50,761	21–19
41	May 22	@ Red Sox	5–3	Santana (6–2)	Matsuzaka (0–2)	Rodríguez (12)	38,092	22–19
42	May 23	@ Red Sox	3–2	Feliciano (1–1)	Papelbon (0–1)	Putz (2)	37,871	23–19
43	May 24	@ Red Sox	12–5	Wakefield (6–2)	Redding (0–1)		37,446	23–20
44	May 25	Nationals	5–2	Maine (4–3)	Lannan (2–4)	Rodríguez (13)	41,103	24–20
45	May 26	Nationals	6–1	Hernández (4–1)	Stammen (0–1)		39,376	25–20
46	May 27	Nationals	7–4	Santana (7–2)	Zimmermann (2–2)		40,171	26–20
47	May 29	Marlins	2–1 (11)	Feliciano (2–1)	Sanches (1–1)		40,677	27–20
48	May 30	Marlins	7–3	Johnson (4–1)	Redding (0–2)	Núñez (1)	40,727	27–21
49	May 31	Marlins	3–2	Maine (5–3)	Volstad (4–4)	Rodríguez (14)	40,482	28–21

June (9–18)

#	Date	Opponent	Score	Win	Loss	Save	Attendance	Record
50	June 1	@ Pirates	8–5	Gorzelanny (3–1)	Putz (1–4)	Capps (11)	11,812	28–22
51	June 2	@ Pirates	3–1	Duke (6–4)	Santana (7–3)	Capps (12)	10,459	28–23
	June 3	@ Pirates	Postponed					
52	June 4	@ Pirates	11–6	Jackson (1–0)	Pelfrey (4–2)		20,684	28–24
53	June 5	@ Nationals	3–1 (10)	Green (1–2)	Hanrahan (0–3)	Rodríguez (15)	20,353	29–24
54	June 6	@ Nationals	7–1	Lannan (3–5)	Maine (5–4)		31,456	29–25
55	June 7	@ Nationals	7–0	Hernández (5–1)	Stammen (0–2)		31,841	30–25
56	June 9	Phillies	6–5	Santana (8–3)	Condrey (4–1)	Rodríguez (16)	37,152	31–25
57	June 10	Phillies	5–4 (11)	Park (2–1)	Parnell (2–1)	Madson (3)	38,723	31–26
58	June 11	Phillies	6–3 (10)	Eyre (1–1)	Parnell (2–2)	Madson (4)	38,532	31–27
59	June 12	@ Yankees	9–8	Rivera (1–2)	Rodríguez (1–1)		47,967	31–28
60	June 13	@ Yankees	6–2	Nieve (1–0)	Pettitte (6–3)		48,056	32–28
61	June 14	@ Yankees	15–0	Burnett (5–3)	Santana (8–4)		47,943	32–29
62	June 16	@ Orioles	6–4	Pelfrey (5–2)	Guthrie (4–7)	Rodríguez (17)	20,626	33–29
63	June 17	@ Orioles	6–4	Johnson (3–3)	Feliciano (2–2)	Sherrill (13)	31,906	33–30
64	June 18	@ Orioles	5–4	Albers (1–2)	Rodríguez (1–2)		23,009	33–31
65	June 19	Rays	5–3	Nieve (2–0)	Sonnanstine (5–7)	Rodríguez (18)	38,493	34–31
66	June 20	Rays	3–1	Shields (6–5)	Santana (8–5)	Howel (4)	37,992	34–32
67	June 21	Rays	10–6	Nelson (2–0)	Parnell (2–3)		38,791	34–33
68	June 22	Cardinals	6–4	Redding (1–2)	Wellemeyer (6–7)	Rodríguez (19)	38,488	35–33
69	June 23	Cardinals	3–0	Piñeiro (6–8)	Hernández (5–2)		38,903	35–34
70	June 24	Cardinals	11–0	Nieve (3–0)	Thompson (2–3)		39,689	36–34
71	June 25	Cardinals	3–2	Santana (9–5)	Carpenter (5–2)	Rodríguez (20)	41,221	37–34
72	June 26	Yankees	9–1	Sabathia (7–4)	Pelfrey (5–3)		41,278	37–35
73	June 27	Yankees	5–0	Burnett (6–4)	Redding (1–3)		41,302	37–36
74	June 28	Yankees	4–2	Wang (1–6)	Hernández (5–3)	Rivera (18)	41,315	37–37
75	June 29	@ Brewers	10–6	Looper (6–4)	Nieve (3–1)	Hoffman (18)	39,872	37–38
76	June 30	@ Brewers	6–3	Burns (1–1)	Santana (9–6)		35,369	37–39

July (12–14)

#	Date	Opponent	Score	Win	Loss	Save	Attendance	Record
77	July 1	@ Brewers	1–0	Pelfrey (6–3)	Gallardo (8–5)	Rodríguez (21)	35,409	38–39
78	July 2	@ Pirates	9–8 (10)	Rodríguez (2–2)	Capps (1–4)		14,321	39–39
79	July 3	@ Phillies	7–2	López (1–0)	Hernández (5–4)		45,231	39–40
80	July 4	@ Phillies	4–1	Moyer (7–6)	Nieve (3–2)	Lidge (15)	45,141	39–41
81	July 5	@ Phillies	2–0	Blanton (5–4)	Santana (9–7)	Lidge (16)	45,333	39–42
82	July 7	Dodgers	8–0	Kershaw (6–5)	Pelfrey (6–4)		39,696	39–43
83	July 8	Dodgers	5–4	Pérez (2–2)	Kuroda (3–5)	Rodríguez (22)	40,027	40–43
84	July 9	Dodgers	11–2	Wolf (4–3)	Hernández (5–5)		39,865	40–44
85	July 10	Reds	3–0	Arroyo (9–8)	Nieve (3–3)		39,203	40–45
86	July 11	Reds	4–0	Santana (10–7)	Cueto (8–6)		39,396	41–45
87	July 12	Reds	9–7	Pelfrey (7–4)	Harang (5–9)	Rodríguez (23)	40,014	42–45
88	July 16	@ Braves	5–3	Acosta (1–0)	Feliciano (2–3)	Soriano (13)	32,736	42–46
89	July 17	@ Braves	11–0	Jurrjens (8–7)	Pelfrey (7–5)		50,704	42–47
90	July 18	@ Braves	5–1	Santana (11–7)	Kawakami (5–7)		51,175	43–47
91	July 19	@ Braves	7–1	Vasquez (7–7)	Redding (1–4)		34,923	43–48
92	July 20	@ Nationals	6–2	Hernández (6–5)	Martin (0–1)		19,169	44–48
93	July 21	@ Nationals	4–0	Lannan (7–7)	Pérez (2–2)		23,414	44–49
94	July 22	@ Nationals	3–1	Stammen (3–5)	Pelfrey (7–6)	MacDougal (6)	23,583	44–50
95	July 24	@ Astros	4–5	Hampton (6–7)	Santana (11–8)	Valverde (11)	42,967	44–51
96	July 25	@ Astros	10–3	Niese (1–0)	Ortiz (3–5)		43,302	45–51
97	July 26	@ Astros	8–3	Hernández (7–5)	Moehler (7–6)	Green (1)	34,642	46–51
98	July 27	Rockies	7–3	Feliciano (3–3)	Rincón (3–2)		38,936	47–51
99	July 28	Rockies	4–0	Pelfrey (8–6)	Marquis (12–7)		39,126	48–51
	July 29	Rockies	Postponed					
100	July 30	Rockies	7–0	Santana (12–8)	Hammel (5–6)		40,024	49–51
101	July 30	Rockies	4–2	de la Rosa (9–7)	Niese (1–1)	Street (26)	38,962	49–52
102	July 31	Diamondbacks	3–2	Vásquez (2–2)	Green (1–3)	Qualls (19)	38,241	49–53

August (10–19)

#	Date	Opponent	Score	Win	Loss	Save	Attendance	Record
103	August 1	Diamondbacks	9–6	Feliciano (4–3)	Zavada (2–3)	Rodríguez (24)	39,574	50–53
104	August 2	Diamondbacks	5–2	Garland (6–10)	Pelfrey (8–7)		38,374	50–54
105	August 3	Diamondbacks	6–5	Haren (11–6)	Figueroa (0–2)	Qualls (20)	39,320	50–55
106	August 4	Cardinals	12–7 (10)	McClellan (3–2)	Feliciano (4–4)		40,354	50–56
107	August 5	Cardinals	9–0	Figueroa (1–2)	Lohse (4–7)	Parnell (1)	39,781	51–56
108	August 6	@ Padres	8–3	Richard (5–3)	Hernández (7–6)		18,880	51–57
109	August 7	@ Padres	6–2	Bell (4–1)	Rodríguez (2–3)		23,038	51–58
110	August 8	@ Padres	3–1	Latos (4–1)	Parnell (2–4)	Bell (28)	35,184	51–59
111	August 9	@ Padres	5–1	Santana (13–8)	Stauffer (1–4)		27,754	52–59
112	August 10	@ Diamondbacks	7–4	Davis (7–10)	Pelfrey (8–8)		23,069	52–60
113	August 11	@ Diamondbacks	6–2	Scherzer (7–6)	Hernández (7–7)		24,576	52–61
114	August 12	@ Diamondbacks	6–4	Feliciano (5–4)	Rauch (2–1)	Rodríguez (25)	22,320	53–61
115	August 14	Giants	3–0	Parnell (3–4)	Zito (8–11)	Rodríguez (26)	38,997	54–61
116	August 15	Giants	5–4 (10)	Wilson (5–5)	Rodríguez (2–4)		39,652	54–62
117	August 16	Giants	3–2	Rodríguez (3–4)	Romo (3–2)		38,793	55–62
118	August 17	Giants	10–1	Martinez (3–1)	Hernández (7–8)		38,584	55–63
119	August 18	Braves	9–4	Pérez (3–3)	Lowe (12–8)		38,613	56–63
120	August 19	Braves	14–2	Jurrjens (10–8)	Parnell (3–5)		38,602	56–64
121	August 20	Braves	3–2	Kawakami (6–9)	Santana (13–9)	Soriano (18)	39,105	56–65
122	August 21	Phillies	2–4	Pelfrey (9–8)	Hamels (7–8)	Rodríguez (27)	38,243	57–65
123	August 22	Phillies	4–1	Happ (10–2)	Misch (0–1)	Lidge (24)	38,049	57–66
124	August 23	Phillies	9–7	Martínez (2–0)	Pérez (3–4)	Lidge (25)	39,038	57–67
125	August 24	Phillies	6–2	Lee (5–0)	Parnell (3–6)		39,336	57–68
126	August 25	@ Marlins	2–1	West (5–5)	Figueroa (1–3)	Núñez (15)	14,278	57–69
127	August 26	@ Marlins	5–3	Johnson (13–3)	Pelfrey (9–9)	Núñez (16)	16,123	57–70
128	August 27	@ Marlins	10–3	Redding (2–4)	Sánchez (2–5)		12,423	58–70
129	August 28	@ Cubs	5–2	Gregg (5–5)	Stokes (1–3)	Mármol (6)	39,381	58–71
130	August 29	@ Cubs	11–4	Dempster (8–7)	Parnell (3–7)		40,857	58–72
131	August 30	@ Cubs	4–1	Figueroa (2–3)	Zambrano (7–6)	Rodríguez (28)	39,907	59–72

September (8–20)

#	Date	Opponent	Score	Win	Loss	Save	Attendance	Record
132	September 1	@ Rockies	8–3	de la Rosa (13–9)	Pelfrey (9–10)		26,190	59–73
133	September 2	@ Rockies	5–2	Jiménez (13–10)	Stokes (1–4)	Morales (1)	26,276	59–74
134	September 3	@ Rockies	8–3	Misch (1–1)	Marquis (14–10)		22,566	60–74
135	September 4	Cubs	6–2	Stokes (2–4)	Gregg (5–6)	Rodríguez (29)	37,953	61–74
136	September 5	Cubs	5–3	Harden (9–8)	Figueroa (2–4)	Mármol (9)	38,759	61–75
137	September 6	Cubs	4–2	Pelfrey (10–10)	Wells (10–8)	Rodríguez (30)	39,593	62–75
138	September 8	Marlins	4–2	Sanches (4–1)	Redding (2–5)	Núñez (19)	37,474	62–76
139	September 9	Marlins	6–3	Nolasco (11–8)	Misch (1–2)	Núñez (20)	37,312	62–77
140	September 10	Marlins	13–4	Badenhop (7–4)	Parnell (3–8)		37,620	62–78
141	September 11	@ Phillies	4–2	Hamels (9–9)	Figueroa (2–5)	Madson (7)	44,377	62–79
142	September 12	@ Phillies	10–9	Feliciano (6–4)	Madson (5–5)	Rodríguez (31)	45,243	63–79
143	September 13	@ Phillies	5–4	Kendrick (1–1)	Maine (5–5)	Lidge (29)	45,024	63–80
144	September 13	@ Phillies	1–0	Martínez (5–0)	Redding (2–6)	Madson (8)	44,901	63–81
145	September 15	@ Braves	6–0	Hanson (10–3)	Misch (1–3)		25,094	63–82
146	September 16	@ Braves	6–5	O'Flaherty (2–1)	Rodríguez (3–5)		17,988	63–83
147	September 17	@ Braves	7–3	Jurrjens (12–10)	Figueroa (2–6)		20,192	63–84
148	September 18	Nationals	6–5	Martin (5–4)	Pelfrey (10–11)	MacDougal (16)	38,063	63–85
149	September 19	Nationals	3–2	Redding (3–6)	Lannan (9–12)	Rodríguez (32)	37,906	64–85
150	September 20	Nationals	6–2	Maine (6–5)	Mock (3–9)	Rodríguez (33)	38,347	65–85
151	September 21	Braves	11–3	Lowe (15–9)	Misch (1–4)	Kawakami (1)	37,706	65–86
152	September 22	Braves	3–1	Jurrjens (13–10)	Figueroa (2–7)	Soriano (25)	37,823	65–87
153	September 23	Braves	5–2	Hudson (2–1)	Pelfrey (10–12)	Soriano (26)	38,266	65–88
154	September 25	@ Marlins	6–5	Parnell (4–8)	Núñez (4–6)	Rodríguez (34)	39,031	66–88
155	September 26	@ Marlins	9–6	West (8–6)	Maine (6–6)	Donnelly (1)	35,666	66–89
156	September 27	@ Marlins	4–0	Misch (2–4)	Volstad (9–13)		31,167	67–89
157	September 28	@ Nationals	2–1	Detwiler (1–6)	Figueroa (2–8)	MacDougal (17)	18,600	67–90
158	September 29	@ Nationals	4–3	Clippard (3–2)	Green (1–4)	MacDougal (18)	19,614	67–91
159	September 30	@ Nationals	7–4	Villone (5–6)	Rodríguez (3–6)		23,944	67–92

October (3–0)

#	Date	Opponent	Score	Win	Loss	Save	Attendance	Record
160	October 2	Astros	7–1	Maine (7–6)	Rodríguez (14–12)		37,576	68–92
161	October 3	Astros	5–1	Misch (3–4)	Bazardo (1–3)	Rodríguez (35)	37,578	69–92
162	October 4	Astros	4–0	Figueroa (3–8)	López (0–2)		38,135	70–92

Please do not edit this line: OgreBot End-->

== Player stats ==
=== Batting ===
Legend: G = Games played; AB = At-bats; H = Hits; BA = Batting average; OBP = On-base percentage; HR = Home runs; RBI = Runs batted in; R = Runs scored; SB = Stolen bases

Player	G	AB	H	BA	OBP	HR	RBI	R	SB
Marlon Anderson	4	4	0	.000	.000	0	0	0	0
Carlos Beltrán	81	308	100	.325	.415	10	48	50	11
Ángel Berroa	14	27	4	.148	.233	0	2	4	0
Emil Brown	3	5	1	.200	.333	0	0	0	0
Robinson Cancel	1	1	0	.000	.000	0	0	0	0
Luis Castillo	142	486	147	.302	.387	1	40	77	20
Ramón Castro*	26	79	20	.253	.322	3	13	5	0
Ryan Church*	67	232	65	.280	.332	2	22	26	6
Alex Cora	82	271	68	.251	.320	1	18	31	8
Carlos Delgado	26	94	28	.298	.393	4	23	15	0
Nick Evans	30	65	15	.231	.275	1	7	5	0
Pedro Feliciano	88	0	0	.000	1.000	0	0	0	0
Nelson Figueroa	16	22	3	.136	.174	0	3	1	0
Jeff Francoeur*	75	289	90	.311	.338	10	41	40	1
Sean Green	1	1	0	.000	.000	0	0	0	0
Anderson Hernández*	46	135	34	.252	.315	2	14	14	2
Liván Hernández*	24	40	5	.125	.146	0	0	0	0
John Maine	16	27	4	.148	.148	0	2	0	0
Fernando Martínez	29	91	16	.176	.242	1	8	11	2
Ramón Martínez	12	42	7	.167	.182	0	4	1	1
Pat Misch	22	13	0	.000	.133	0	0	0	0
Daniel Murphy	155	508	135	.266	.313	12	63	60	4
Jon Niese	5	8	1	.125	.125	0	0	0	0
Fernando Nieve	8	9	3	.333	.333	0	1	0	0
Ángel Pagán	88	343	105	.306	.350	6	32	54	14
Mike Pelfrey	31	52	5	.096	.143	0	4	4	0
Óliver Pérez	14	22	6	.273	.304	0	0	1	0
Tim Redding	30	29	2	.069	.069	0	0	0	0
Jeremy Reed	126	161	39	.242	.301	0	9	9	0
Argenis Reyes	9	17	2	.118	.167	0	0	0	1
José Reyes	36	147	41	.279	.355	2	15	18	11
Johan Santana	25	42	7	.167	.255	0	4	1	0
Omir Santos	96	281	73	.260	.296	7	40	28	0
Brian Schneider	59	170	37	.218	.292	3	24	11	0
Gary Sheffield	100	268	74	.276	.372	10	43	44	2
Cory Sullivan	64	136	34	.250	.338	2	15	17	7
Ken Takahashi	28	2	0	.000	.000	0	0	0	0
Fernando Tatís	125	340	96	.282	.339	8	48	42	4
Josh Thole	17	53	17	.321	.356	0	9	2	1
Wilson Valdéz	41	86	22	.256	.326	0	7	11	0
David Wright	144	535	164	.307	.390	10	72	88	27
**Team totals**	**162**	**5453**	**1472**	**.270**	**.335**	**95**	**631**	**671**	**122**

=== Pitching ===
Legend: G = Games pitched; GS = Games started; IP = Innings pitched; W = Wins; L = Losses; SV = Saves; ERA = Earned run average; H = Hits allowed; SO = Strikeouts; BB = Walks; bold = league leader

Player	G	GS	IP	W	L	SV	ERA	H	SO	BB
Lance Broadway	8	0	14 2/3	0	0	0	6.75	19	9	6
Elmer Dessens	28	0	32 2/3	0	0	0	3.31	24	14	10
Pedro Feliciano	**88**	0	59 1/3	6	4	0	3.03	51	59	18
Nelson Figueroa	16	10	70 1/3	3	8	0	4.09	80	59	24
Casey Fossum	3	0	4	0	0	0	2.25	4	3	4
Sean Green	79	0	69 2/3	1	4	1	4.52	64	54	36
Liván Hernández	23	23	135	7	8	0	5.47	164	75	51
John Maine	15	15	81 1/3	7	6	0	4.43	67	55	38
Pat Misch	22	7	59	3	4	0	4.12	62	23	19
Jon Niese	5	5	25 2/3	1	1	0	4.21	27	23	14
Fernando Nieve	8	7	36 2/3	3	3	0	2.95	36	23	19
Darren O'Day	4	0	3	0	0	0	0.00	5	2	1
Bobby Parnell	68	8	88 1/3	4	8	1	5.30	101	74	46
Mike Pelfrey	31	31	184 1/3	10	12	0	5.03	213	107	66
Óliver Pérez	14	14	66	3	4	0	6.82	69	62	58
J. J. Putz	29	0	29 1/3	1	4	2	5.22	29	19	19
Tim Redding	30	17	120	3	6	0	5.10	122	76	50
Francisco Rodríguez	70	0	68	3	6	35	3.71	51	73	38
Johan Santana	25	25	166 2/3	13	9	0	3.13	156	146	46
Brian Stokes	69	0	70 1/3	2	4	0	3.97	72	45	38
Tobi Stoner	4	0	9	0	0	0	4.00	9	5	3
Jon Switzer	4	0	3 1/3	0	0	0	8.10	4	3	2
Ken Takahashi	28	0	27 1/3	0	1	0	2.96	23	23	14
Billy Wagner	2	0	2	0	0	0	0.00	0	4	1
**Team totals**	**162**	**162**	**1426**	**70**	**92**	**39**	**4.45**	**1452**	**1031**	**616**

All stats as of October 4, 2009

== Farm system ==
Level	Team	League	Manager
AAA	Buffalo Bisons	International League	Ken Oberkfell
AA	Binghamton Mets	Eastern League	Mako Oliveras
A	St. Lucie Mets	Florida State League	Tim Teufel
A	Savannah Sand Gnats	South Atlantic League	Edgar Alfonzo
Short-Season A	Brooklyn Cyclones	New York–Penn League	Pedro López
Rookie	Kingsport Mets	Appalachian League	Mike DiFelice
Rookie	GCL Mets	Gulf Coast League	Julio Franco

Preceded by 2008	New York Mets seasons 2009	Succeeded by 2010
