= Mike Pelfrey =

American baseball player (born 1984)

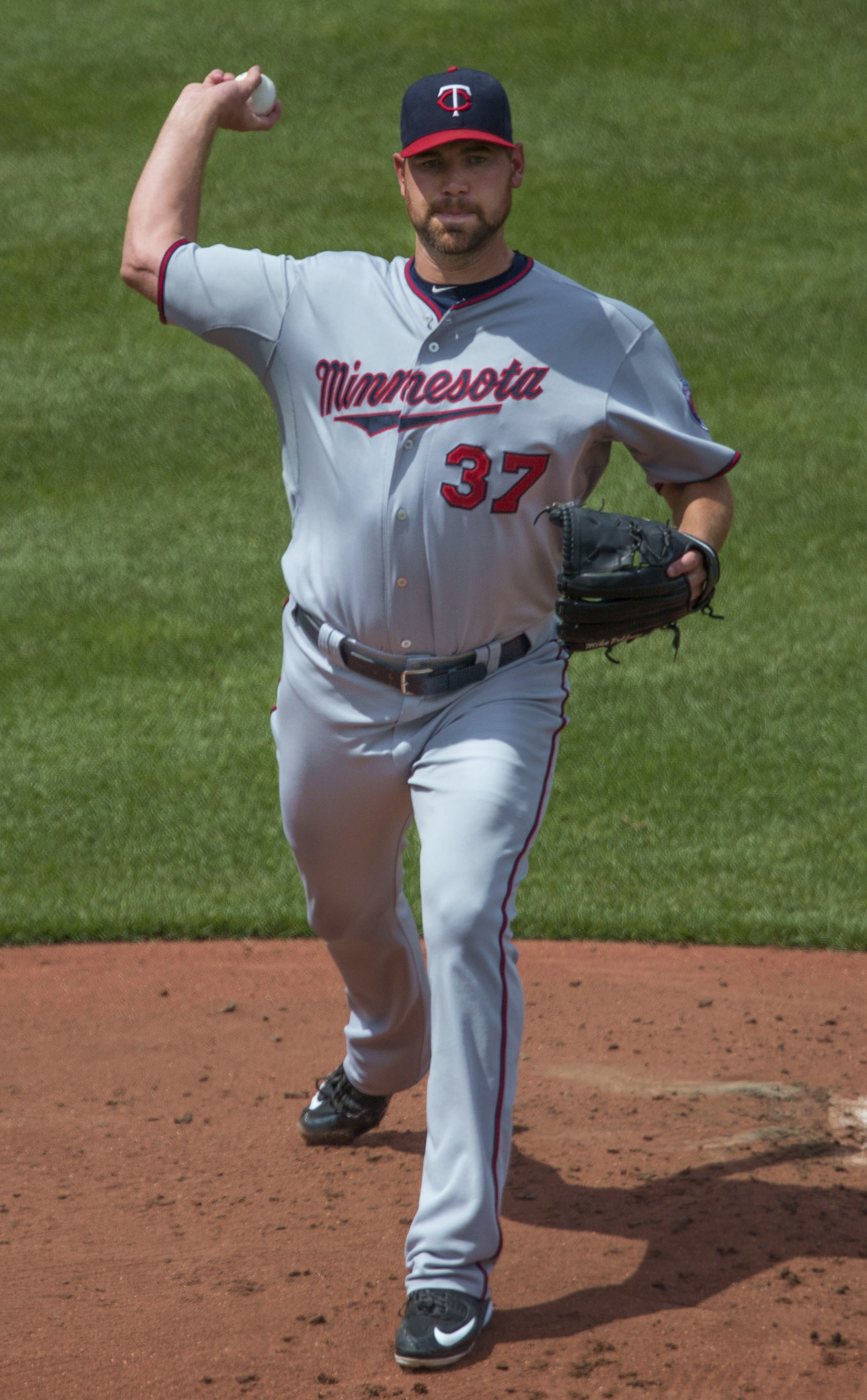
- Pelfrey with the Minnesota Twins in 2015
- Pitcher
- Born: January 14, 1984 (age 42); Wright-Patterson Air Force Base, Ohio, U.S.
- Batted: Right Threw: Right

MLB debut
- July 8, 2006, for the New York Mets

Last MLB appearance
- September 29, 2017, for the Chicago White Sox

Career statistics
- Win–loss record: 68–103
- Earned run average: 4.68
- Strikeouts: 838
- Stats at Baseball Reference

Teams
- New York Mets (2006–2012); Minnesota Twins (2013–2015); Detroit Tigers (2016); Chicago White Sox (2017)
Medals
Men's baseball
Representing United States
World University Championship
Gold medal – first place	2004 Tainan	Team

Michael Alan Pelfrey (born January 14, 1984) is an American college baseball coach and former professional baseball pitcher. He was the pitching coach at Wichita State University from 2019 to 2023, where he played from 2003 to 2005 for head coach Gene Stephenson. He played in Major League Baseball (MLB) for the New York Mets, Minnesota Twins, Detroit Tigers, and Chicago White Sox.

== Professional career ==
After his junior year at Wichita State University, Pelfrey entered the June 2005 amateur baseball draft. Having chosen Scott Boras as his agent, there were concerns that Pelfrey would hold out or require a higher-than-market value contract. The Mets selected him with the ninth overall pick, even though he was projected to have gone higher than that. After six months of negotiations, the Mets signed Pelfrey to a four-year major league contract on January 10, 2006. The deal reportedly included a $3.5 million signing bonus and $5.3 million in guaranteed salary.

Pelfrey began the 2006 season on the Single-A St. Lucie Mets, going 2–1 with a 1.64 ERA in four starts before being promoted to the Double-A Binghamton Mets. With Binghamton, he was 2–1 with a 2.66 ERA and 55 strikeouts in 47 1/3 innings over his first eight starts.

=== New York Mets ===
==== 2006–2008 ====
Pelfrey made his major-league debut with the Mets on July 8, 2006, earning the win in a 17–3 victory against the Florida Marlins. The Mets hit grand slams (José Valentín and Carlos Beltrán) in Pelfrey's first two major league starts; this was a first in baseball history. He was sent down to the Triple-A Norfolk Tides at the beginning of August.

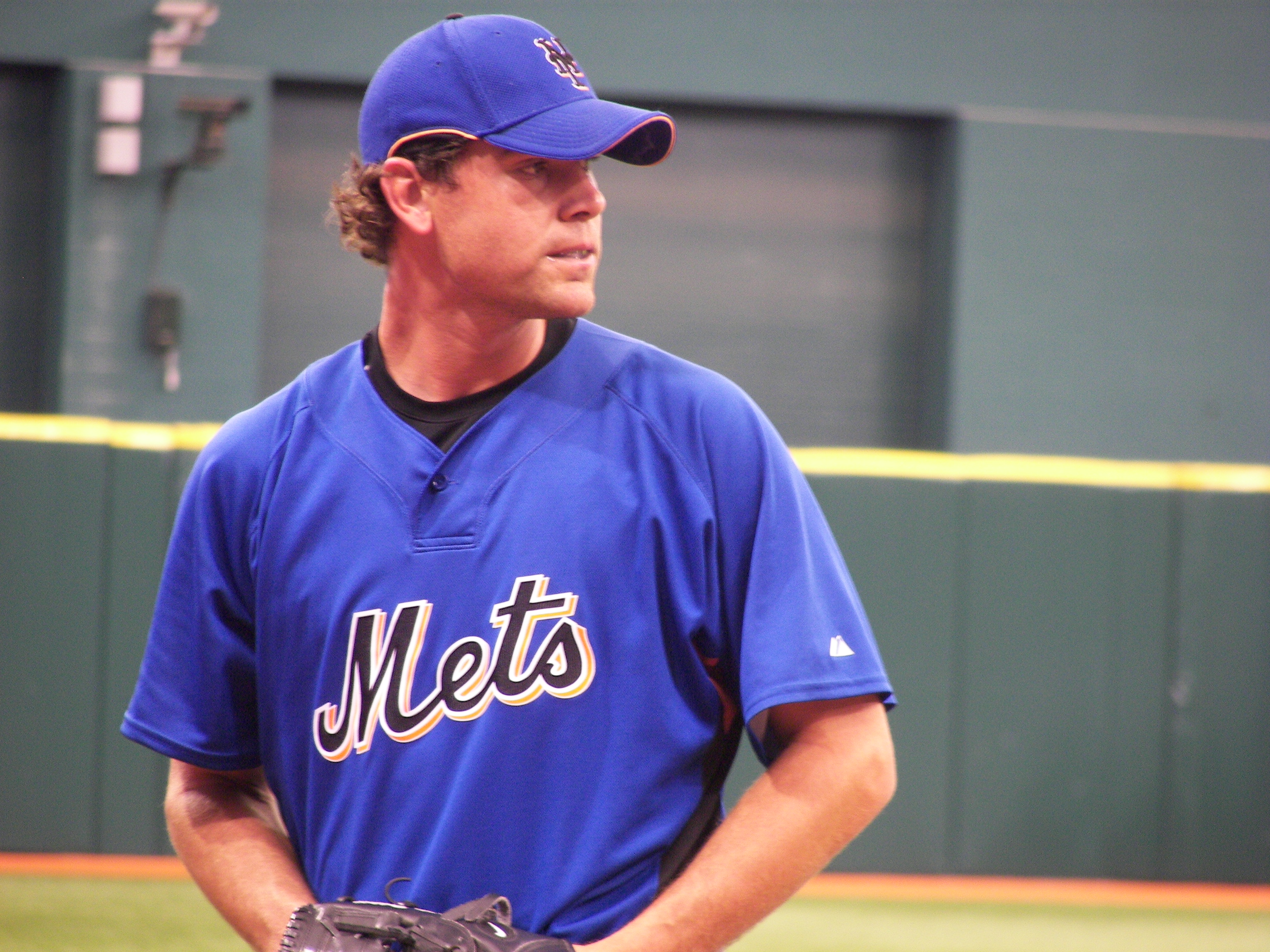
Pelfrey before a spring training game at Tropicana Field in St. Petersburg, Florida

In 2007, Pelfrey pitched well in spring training and earned a spot in the Mets starting rotation to begin the season. However, after starting the season 0–5 with a 6.53 ERA, he was demoted to the Triple-A New Orleans Zephyrs. He continued to make occasional starts for the Mets throughout the season, at one point running his record to 0–7. However, Pelfrey found success later in the season. Having been recalled when rosters expanded on September 1 to pitch in Atlanta, Pelfrey put together his best start of the season giving up only one run on one hit in six innings for his first win of the season. Pelfrey won his next two starts in September in the midst of a close pennant race, finishing the season with a record of 3–8.

On March 30, 2008, the Mets named Pelfrey as their Number 5 starter. Pelfrey made his first start of the season on April 9, earning a win against the Philadelphia Phillies allowing two runs on five hits and two walks while striking out three in five innings pitched. Pelfrey then followed up this performance pitching seven shutout innings against the Washington Nationals and earned the win. It was the first major league start of his career where he did not give up a run. On May 15, 2008, Pelfrey pitched another good game against the Nationals. He pitched 7 2/3innings, not allowing a hit until the seventh and only allowed one run.

On June 11, 2008, Pelfrey pitched 8 innings, and attempted to pitch a complete game, but was replaced by Billy Wagner when he allowed a single to lead off the 9th. In the time he pitched, he only allowed one run and walked 2, while striking out 8 Diamondbacks. However, Mike got a no-decision as the Mets won in extra innings, 5–3, after Wagner blew a 3–0 lead in the 9th by allowing a 3-run homer to Mark Reynolds with 2 outs and 2 strikes. Later in the year, Pelfrey set a club record for most batters faced without giving up a home run, at 243; the streak was broken by Adam Dunn of the Reds.

On July 14, 2008, Pelfrey was named the National League Player of the Week. Pelfrey went 2–0 while not allowing a run over his two starts against the San Francisco Giants and Colorado Rockies during the week ending July 13. Over his 15.0 shutout innings, Mike scattered nine hits without a walk, while striking out 10.

On August 20, 2008, Pelfrey pitched the first complete game of his career against the Atlanta Braves. He struck out 3 in the 9 innings, throwing 108 pitches. It was a 3-hitter. In his next turn, Pelfrey pitched another complete game victory, this time allowing only 6 hits and 1 run while recording his 13th win of the season. So far, David Cone is the only former Mets pitcher to pitch 3 consecutive complete game victories.

Once known to throw a power curveball, he gave this pitch up and learned a slider at the request of his former pitching coach Rick Peterson. However, new pitching coach Dan Warthen has since allowed Pelfrey to work his curveball back into his pitching repertoire.

On August 25, 2008, Pelfrey pitched his second consecutive complete game win, the first Met to do so since Bret Saberhagen did it in 1995. He allowed only six hits with one earned run while striking out six and walking none.

At times, Pelfrey wore a mouthpiece while he pitched. He suffered from temporomandibular joint disorder after being hit by a ball in college, he was seen chewing on it between pitches. In early 2008, after beginning the season with some good and some bad performances, Mike stopped using the mouthpiece. Mike then went on to pitch dominantly in June, July, and August. This led fans and announcer and former Mets pitcher Ron Darling to say that perhaps Mike was pitching better in part because he had stopped using the mouthpiece, which may have been a distraction.

==== 2009–2012 ====
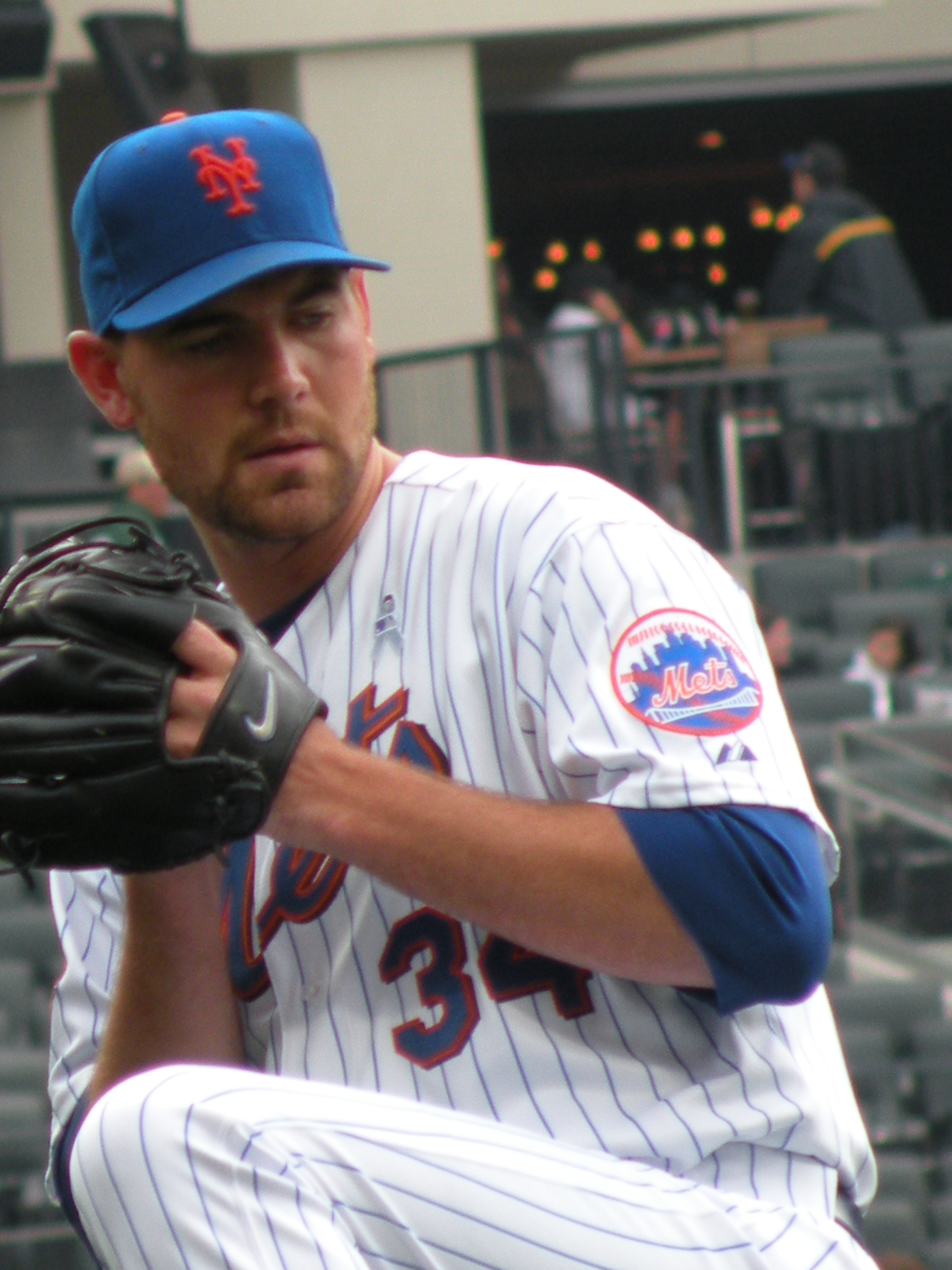
Pelfrey during his tenure with the New York Mets in 2009

Pelfrey had the honor of starting the first official game at Citi Field on April 13. He allowed a leadoff home run to the Padres' Jody Gerut and surrendered five earned runs overall in the Mets' 6–5 loss. Like the team itself, Pelfrey had a disappointing year, going 10–12 with a 5.03 ERA and a 1.51 WHIP. Pelfrey also led the majors in balks, with 6. On May 17, he became the first Mets pitcher since Al Leiter to balk three times in a game.

During the 2009–2010 offseason, Pelfrey worked with Warthen on utilizing secondary pitches, resulting in Pelfrey beginning to throw a curveball and splitter. In a 6 hours and 53 minutes, 20-inning game against the Cardinals, Pelfrey was utilized as a relief pitcher in the 20th inning. Pelfrey earned his first career save in the major leagues before Francisco Rodriguez got a win for the season, and Joe Mather (Cardinal's third baseman/outfielder) got the loss.

His 2010 season was his best year to date. He had a spectacular first half posting a 10-1 record. His second half was much more average posting a 5-8 record. His final stats were 15 wins and 9 losses, a 3.66 ERA, with 113 strike outs and 204 innings pitched.

On June 18, 2011, Pelfrey pitched a complete-game gem against the Los Angeles Angels of Anaheim. He allowed one run, five hits, and struck out five. He threw a season high 123 pitches, second highest of his career. Pelfrey was nominated for the Roberto Clemente Award. Overall, 2011 was a disappointing season for Pelfrey, seeing him go 7–13 with a 4.74 ERA.

In January 2012, the Mets and Pelfrey settled their arbitration case for $5.7 million for the 2012 season. On April 26, it was announced that Pelfrey required Tommy John surgery on his elbow, ending his season. He had exited his previous start with stiffness in the elbow. An MRI confirmed a tear in the ulnar collateral ligament of his elbow. The surgery was performed by Dr. James Andrews. According to Pelfrey, the cause of the tear might have been a change in his pitching mechanics He became a free agent following the season.

=== Minnesota Twins ===
On December 20, 2012, the Minnesota Twins announced they had signed Pelfrey to a one-year, $4 million contract. As the Twins had retired number 34 in honor of the late Hall of Famer Kirby Puckett, Pelfrey was assigned number 37.

In 2013, Pelfrey had his worst season in his 8 years in the Majors, finishing 5–13 for the Twins. He pitched in 29 games following his 2012 Tommy John surgery, his ERA finished at 5.19 in his first full year in the American League.

On December 14, 2013, Pelfrey signed a deal with the Minnesota Twins for two years and $11 million, with the potential to earn up to $3.5 million in performance bonuses. Pelfrey made five starts in 2014 before being shut down for the season with groin, elbow, and shoulder injuries.

Pelfrey's 2015 season was more successful, as he posted a 4.26 ERA, his best since 2010. He still only managed a 6–11 record in 30 starts. He had the highest WHIP among major league pitchers (1.48). He became a free agent following the season.

=== Detroit Tigers ===
On December 6, 2015, Pelfrey signed a two-year, $16 million contract with the Detroit Tigers. Pelfrey spent some of the 2016 season on the Disabled List due to a lower back ailment, limiting him to 24 games (22 starts). In a mostly ineffective season, he compiled a 4–10 record and 5.07 ERA in 119 innings pitched.

Pelfrey was released by the Tigers on March 30, 2017.

=== Chicago White Sox ===
On April 8, 2017, the White Sox signed Pelfrey to a minor league deal, assigning him to the Triple-A Charlotte. On April 22, 2017, the White Sox purchased his contract from Charlotte as he replaced the injured James Shields. He made his White Sox debut on the same day against the Cleveland Indians. In 2017 he was 3-12 with a 5.93 ERA. Batters stole 26 bases against him, tied for tops in the major leagues, while being caught three times. He became a free agent following the season.

== Pitching style ==
Pelfrey's pitches, as tracked in 2013 by the PITCHf/x system, were a sinker at 93 mph, a four-seam fastball at 93 mph, a slider at 87 mph, a splitter at 86 mph, and a curveball at 76 mph. His sinker is his primary pitch, although he also likes to use his four-seamer early in the count against right-handed hitters. He tends to use his splitter more against left-handed hitters and his slider more against righties.

Pelfrey has among the lowest strikeout-to-walk ratios in the major leagues since 2000, at 1.75.

== Coaching career ==
On March 6, 2018, Pelfrey retired from professional baseball and accepted a coaching position at Newman University.

In 2019, Pelfrey became the pitching coach at Wichita State University. Following Todd Butler's firing, new Wichita State head coach Eric Wedge retained Pelfrey as pitching coach. Pelfrey remained with the program after Wedge resigned in February 2023.

On May 30, 2023, Wichita State athletic director Kevin Saal announced that interim head coach Loren Hibbs, as well as Pelfrey and the rest of the Shockers coaching staff, would not return in 2024, with the university launching a national search from Wedge's permanent replacement.

== Personal life ==
Pelfrey was one of the victims of the $8 billion fraud perpetrated by wealth manager Allen Stanford. Pelfrey estimated that 99% of his assets were frozen after the fraud was revealed.

Pelfrey is known for his peculiar habit of licking his hands over the course of the game, Pelfrey has said there is a purpose behind the habit and he generally uses it to get a better grip on the ball. The Wall Street Journal counted one start of Pelfrey's and found he did this action 89 times over the course of a game.
