= Tim Redding =

American baseball player (born 1978)

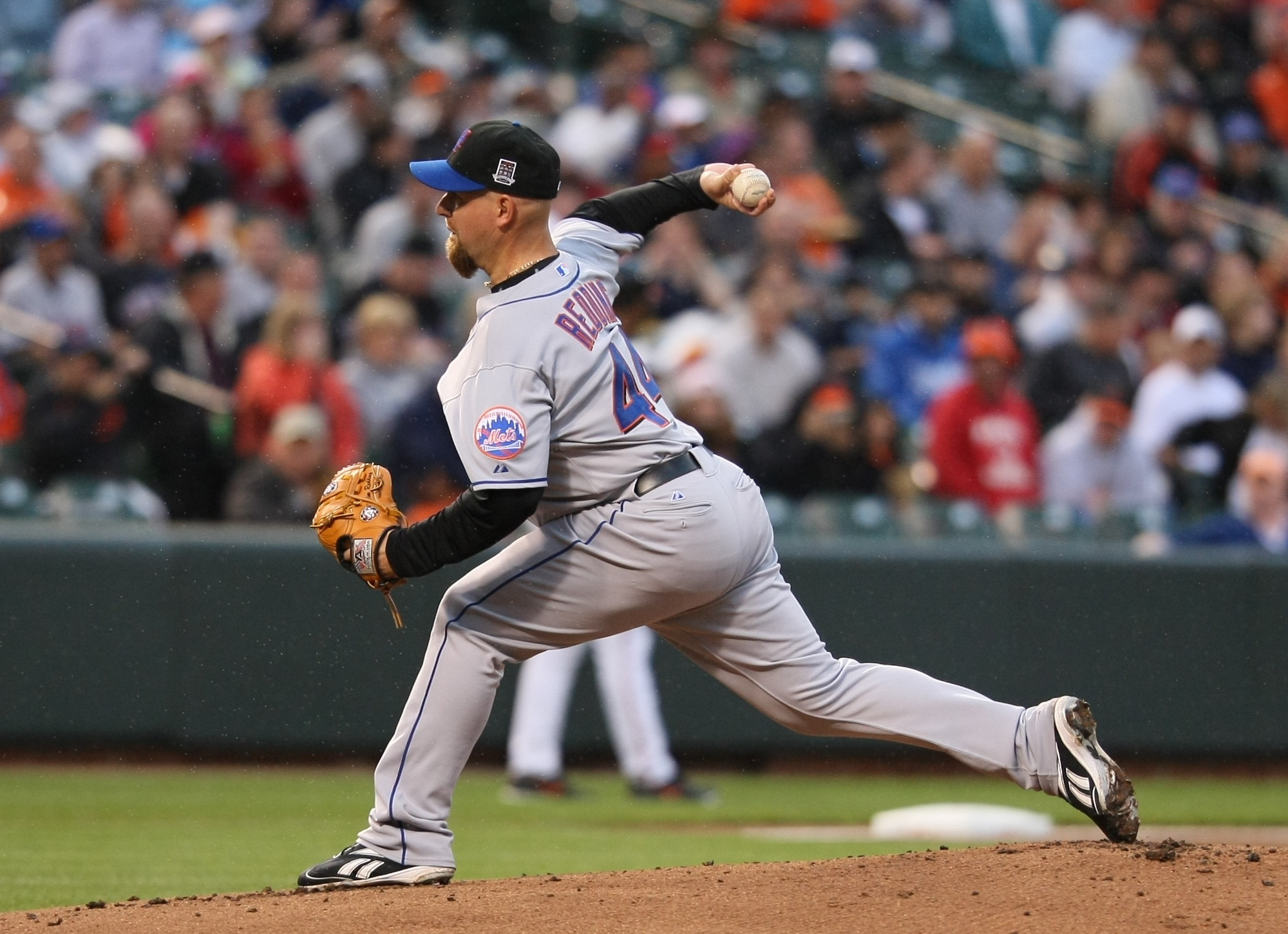
- Redding with the New York Mets in 2009
- Pitcher
- Born: February 12, 1978 (age 48); Rochester, New York, U.S.
- Batted: Right Threw: Right

Professional debut
- MLB: June 24, 2001, for the Houston Astros
- KBO: August 12, 2010, for the Samsung Lions

Last appearance
- MLB: September 30, 2009, for the New York Mets
- KBO: September 24, 2010, for the Samsung Lions

MLB statistics
- Win–loss record: 37–57
- Earned run average: 4.95
- Strikeouts: 552

KBO statistics
- Win–loss record: 1–3
- Earned run average: 5.09
- Strikeouts: 19
- Stats at Baseball Reference

Teams
- Houston Astros (2001–2004); San Diego Padres (2005); New York Yankees (2005); Washington Nationals (2007–2008); New York Mets (2009); Samsung Lions (2010)

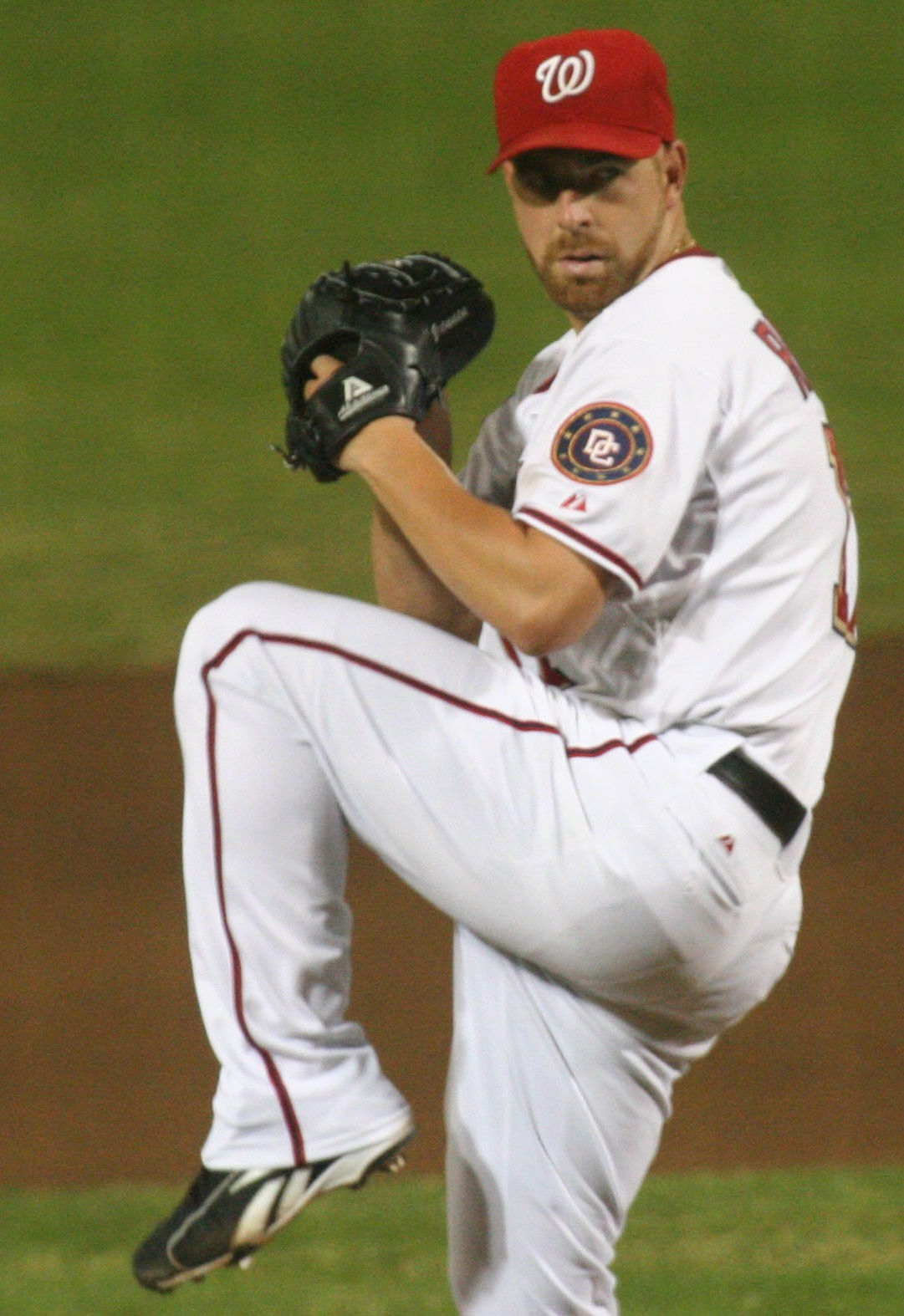
Redding pitching for the Washington Nationals in 2007

Timothy James Redding (born February 12, 1978) is an American former professional baseball pitcher. He pitched in Major League Baseball (MLB) for the Houston Astros, San Diego Padres, Washington Nationals, New York Yankees, and New York Mets.

== Early years ==
Redding was born in Rochester, New York. He graduated from Churchville-Chili Senior High School, then played college baseball at Monroe Community College. He is a grandnephew of actress Joyce Randolph, best known for playing Trixie Norton on The Honeymooners.

== Playing career ==
=== 1997–2004: Houston Astros ===
In the 1997 Major League Baseball draft Redding was drafted by the Houston Astros in the 20th round (610th). In 2000, with the Kissimmee Cobras of the Florida State League, he was 12-5 with a 2.68 ERA in 24 starts and was selected as a Baseball America 2nd team Minor League All-Star, a High-A All-Star, Florida State League All-Star and Florida State League Pitcher of the Year. In 2001, with the Round Rock Express, he was selected as a Double-A All-Star, the Texas League Pitcher of the Year (and All-Star) and again was selected to the Baseball America 2nd team Minor League All-Stars. He was also recognized as the #3 prospect in the Astros system.

He made his Major League debut on June 24, 2001 against the Cincinnati Reds, pitching six innings and allowing five earned runs. He recorded his first credited win on July 2 in a seven-inning start against the Milwaukee Brewers. He appeared in 13 games, with 9 starts in 2001, finishing 3-1 with a 5.50 ERA. He split 2002 between the AAA New Orleans Zephyrs and the Astros, before becoming a regular part of the Houston rotation in 2003. He made 32 starts that year, finishing 10-14 with a 3.68 ERA. In 2004, he was in 27 games, but only 17 were starts and he was 5-7 with a 5.72 ERA.

=== 2005: San Diego Padres and New York Yankees ===
On March 28, 2005 he was traded to the San Diego Padres for Humberto Quintero.

In 2005, Redding would go 0-5 with a 9.31 ERA in nine games (6 starts) with the Padres, while battling injuries, until he was traded to the New York Yankees with Darrell May for Paul Quantrill. The Yankees starting rotation was hurt by injuries and they decided to take "a chance" with Redding. However, his stint with the Yankees would be short lived—he started and lasted one inning against the Boston Red Sox, allowing six runs on four hits and four walks. The next day, he was designated for assignment to allow a spot for pitcher Al Leiter. He spent the rest of the season in AAA with the Columbus Clippers.

=== 2006: Chicago White Sox ===
In 2006, Redding spent the entire season in the minor leagues. He signed a minor league contract with the Chicago White Sox and was assigned to their Triple-A affiliate, the Charlotte Knights. He became a key component of the Knights' pitching rotation, finishing the 2006 season with a 12-10 record and 3.40 ERA in 29 appearances. He led the team in strikeouts (148) and complete games (5). On September 6, 2006, Redding pitched a four-hit shutout against the Toledo Mud Hens in the International League playoffs. At the end of the season, he opted for minor league free agency, and in November signed a minor-league deal with the Washington Nationals.

=== 2007–2008: Washington Nationals ===
In 2007, with the Nationals, Redding had a rough spring training, allowing 11 runs in 8-2/3 inning, and not making the major league club. At Triple-A Columbus, he compiled a 9-5 record with an ERA of 5.32, by the end of June. The Nationals, beset by injuries to its starting pitching rotation, purchased Redding's contract, and in July he made his first big league start since 2005. He went 5 innings, being tagged with three runs and the loss. He followed that start, however, with a six-inning stint, where he allowed 2 runs on five hits, and earned his first win as a major leaguer since September 26, 2004, and first as a starter since July 24.

In 2008, Redding went 10-11 with a 4.95 ERA despite his post-All-Star break slump where he went 3-8 with a 6.92 ERA. Redding also was the victim of seven blown saves, tying for first in the majors. At the season's end, he was non-tendered by the Nationals, making him a free agent.

=== 2009: New York Mets ===
In January 2009, Redding signed a one-year, $2.25 million deal with the New York Mets. Going into spring training, Redding was a candidate to be the fifth starter. He struggled in the games that he pitched in and during the middle of spring training he was "shut down" due to right shoulder fatigue. It was speculated that his shoulder fatigue was caused by his own error. Redding had offseason foot surgery and he had been rushing back to make sure he had secured a spot in the Opening Day rotation. He made his first start of the 2009 season on May 18 against the Los Angeles Dodgers and allowed 2 earned runs over 6 innings. He was non-tendered by the Mets following the season.

=== 2010: Colorado Rockies ===
On January 26, 2010, Redding signed a minor league contract with the Colorado Rockies. He was released on May 6.

=== 2010: New York Yankees ===
On May 12, 2010, Redding signed a minor league contract with the New York Yankees. Redding was named International League pitcher of the week on August 2. He was released on August 5.

=== 2010: Samsung Lions ===
On August 5, 2010, Redding signed with the Samsung Lions of the Korea Baseball Organization. He became a free agent following the season.

=== 2011: Los Angeles Dodgers ===
On December 28, 2010, Redding signed a minor league contract with the Los Angeles Dodgers with an invitation to spring training. He was assigned to the AAA Albuquerque Isotopes. He opted out of his contract on June 15, and became a free agent.

=== 2011: Philadelphia Phillies ===
On June 20, 2011, Redding signed a minor league contract with the Philadelphia Phillies. He was released on July 12, after pitching in 5 games for the Lehigh Valley IronPigs.

=== 2012: Toronto Blue Jays ===
On January 23, 2012, Redding signed a minor league contract with the Toronto Blue Jays. Redding played for the Las Vegas 51s, Triple A team for the Toronto Blue Jays. Redding was released by the 51s on August 10.

=== 2012: Sugar Land Skeeters ===
On August 17, 2012, Redding signed with the Sugar Land Skeeters of the Atlantic League of Professional Baseball. He became a free agent following the season. In 5 starts 27.1 innings he went 3-2 with a 4.28 ERA and 14 strikeouts.

=== 2013: Sultanes de Monterrey ===
On April 2, 2013, Redding signed with the Sultanes de Monterrey of the Mexican League. He was released on June 15. He appeared in 14 games (3 starts) throwing 19 innings struggling mightily going 1-3 with a 9.95 ERA and 15 strikeouts.

=== 2013: Rieleros de Aguascalientes ===
On June 18, 2013, Redding signed with the Rieleros de Aguascalientes of the Mexican League. He was released on August 1. In 17 games 16.1 innings of relief he went 0-1 with a 2.20 ERA with 14 strikeouts and 3 saves.

=== 2013: Southern Maryland Blue Crabs ===
On August 10, 2013, Redding signed with the Southern Maryland Blue Crabs of the Atlantic League of Professional Baseball. He became a free agent following the season. In 19 games 16.2 innings of relief he struggled going 1-2 with a 5.94 ERA and 13 strikeouts.

=== Post-playing career ===
Redding was named pitching coach for the Auburn Doubledays – Washington Nationals Class A Short Season Affiliate of the New York–Penn League for the 2014 season. He coached for Auburn through the 2017 season.

Redding was named pitching coach for the A ball Hagerstown Suns for the 2018 season.

As of 2021, Redding was on the coaching staff of Olivet High School in Michigan.
