= Francisco Rodríguez (Venezuelan pitcher) =

Venezuelan baseball player (born 1982)

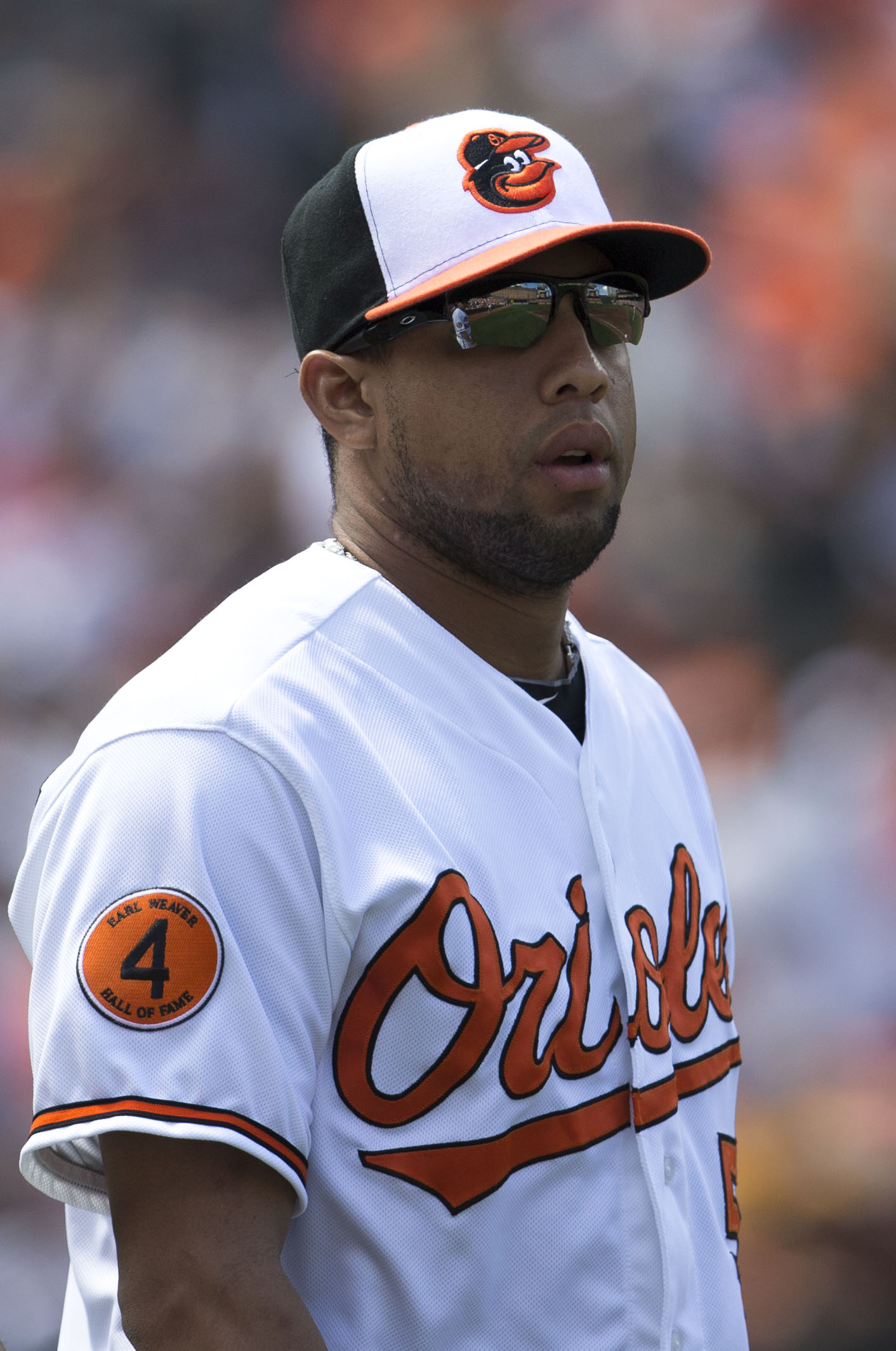
- Rodríguez with the Baltimore Orioles in 2013

Senadores de Caracas
- Pitcher / Coach
- Born: January 7, 1982 (age 44); Caracas, Venezuela
- Batted: Right Threw: Right

MLB debut
- September 18, 2002, for the Anaheim Angels

Last MLB appearance
- June 22, 2017, for the Detroit Tigers

MLB statistics
- Win–loss record: 52–53
- Earned run average: 2.86
- Strikeouts: 1,142
- Saves: 437
- Stats at Baseball Reference

Teams
- Anaheim Angels / Los Angeles Angels of Anaheim (2002–2008); New York Mets (2009–2011); Milwaukee Brewers (2011–2013); Baltimore Orioles (2013); Milwaukee Brewers (2014–2015); Detroit Tigers (2016–2017)

Career highlights and awards
- 6× All-Star (2004, 2007–2009, 2014, 2015); World Series champion (2002); 2× AL Rolaids Relief Man Award (2006, 2008); 3× AL saves leader (2005, 2006, 2008); MLB record 62 saves, single season; Milwaukee Brewers Wall of Honor

Member of the Venezuelan

Baseball Hall of Fame
- Induction: 2026
- Vote: 78%
- Election method: Contemporary Committee

Francisco José Rodríguez Sr. (born January 7, 1982), nicknamed "K-Rod", is a Venezuelan former professional baseball pitcher. He played in Major League Baseball (MLB) for the Anaheim Angels / Los Angeles Angels of Anaheim, New York Mets, Baltimore Orioles, Milwaukee Brewers and Detroit Tigers. He is the pitching coach for the Senadores de Caracas of the Venezuelan Major League.

Rodriguez pitched for the Angels from 2002 to 2008, and the Mets from 2009 to midway through the 2011 season. He served as the closer for both teams. Rodriguez then pitched for the Brewers until July 2013, mostly in a setup role, and for the Orioles for the rest of 2013 before returning to the Brewers for 2014 and 2015, this time as the team's closer. He was then traded to the Detroit Tigers in 2016, and became the Tigers' closer.

In his rookie season, Rodríguez tied Randy Johnson for the record for most victories in a single postseason, recording five wins en route to the Angels winning the World Series; Stephen Strasburg (2019) and Nathan Eovaldi (2023) later accomplished this feat as well. Rodríguez holds the major league record for saves in a single season, with 62, set in 2008 while pitching for the Angels. He is a three-time league leader in saves (2005, 2006, and 2008) and a six-time All-Star. Rodríguez is one of only eight Major League pitchers to accumulate a total of 400 or more saves in his baseball career.

== Professional career ==
=== Los Angeles Angels (2002–2008) ===
==== 2002–2004 ====
Rodríguez signed as an undrafted amateur free agent in 1998. Originally a starting pitcher, Rodríguez moved to relief pitching in 2002 after elbow and shoulder injuries shortened his 2001 minor league season with the Lake Elsinore Storm. In 2002, he made his major league debut. At the time, he was the youngest pitcher in the American League. Because of the multiple injuries to the Angels bullpen, the club brought him up during the middle of September. He emerged as a postseason relief hero, winning five postseason games despite never having won a Major League game before. Although he threw a lively fastball, his sharp-breaking curveball was his most effective pitch, made even better in 2002 by his late season emergence and hitters lack of experience seeing such a huge 12 to 6 late break from a pitch with fastball velocity. The pitch was almost unstoppable in the 2002 postseason.

Because Rodríguez had played very little in the major leagues, hitters in the postseason had very little idea what to expect from him, a situation that often favors the pitcher. The combination of high 90's fastball, the previously unseen high velocity late breaking curve, and the very occasional change up was too much. In the 2002 American League Division Series against the New York Yankees, he got two victories (with 1 win resulting from a blown save). The Angels won the division series against the Yankees in 4 games. During the 2002 American League Championship Series vs the Minnesota Twins, he went 2–0 with seven strikeouts in 4 1/3 innings. The Angels won the series in 5 games. During the 2002 World Series against the San Francisco Giants, he had a 1–1 record with 13 strikeouts in 8 2/3 innings. At 20 years, 286 days old, he became the youngest pitcher ever to win a World Series game. The Angels won the World Series in 7 games due in large part to a rookie set up man that was scheduled for and delivered 3-6 high pressure outs a game.

Rodríguez's nickname of "K-Rod" became popular during the 2002 playoffs. It is a play on "A-Rod", the nickname of former third baseman Alex Rodriguez, with "K" representing the common abbreviation for strikeout.

In 2003, Rodríguez became a setup man. He gave up an earned run in 9 of his first 15 games, but rebounded to only allow 9 in his last 44 appearances. For the 2003 year, Rodriguez made 59 appearances going 8–3 with a 3.03 ERA.

In 2004, Rodríguez was selected for the All-Star Game. On August 24, 2004, he became the sixth pitcher in the Angels' 44-year history to strike out at least 100 batters in a season without starting a game — joining Mark Clear (105 in 1980), DeWayne Buice (109, 1987), Bryan Harvey (101, 1991), Troy Percival (100, 1996), and Scot Shields (109, also in 2004). He finished the 2004 year 4–1 with 123 strikeouts and a 1.82 ERA in 69 relief appearances.

During the 2004 American League Division Series, Francisco Rodriguez had two losses as the Angels lost the division series to the Boston Red Sox in three games.

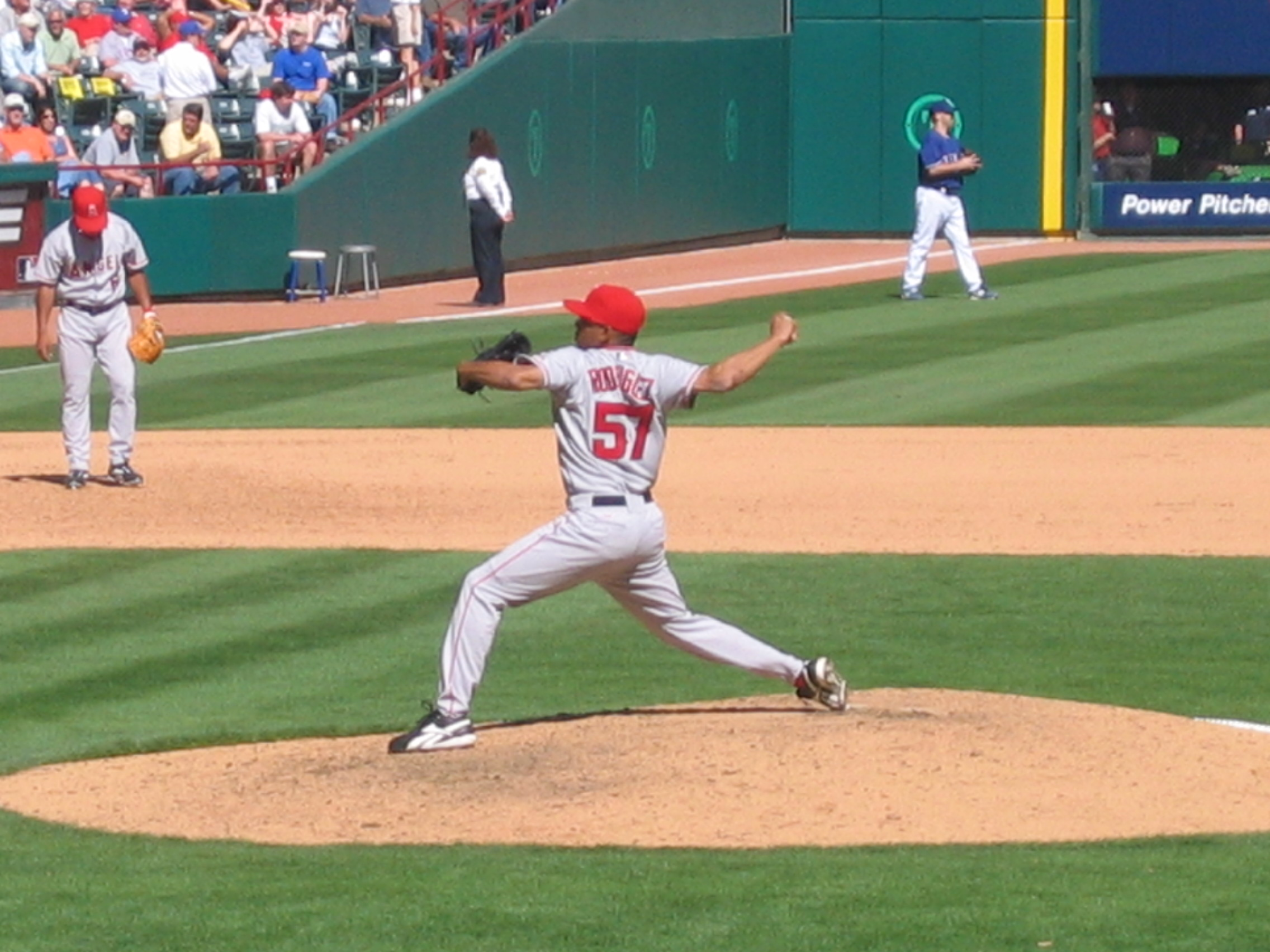
Rodríguez with the Los Angeles Angels of Anaheim in 2005

==== 2005–2007 ====
Entering the 2005 season, veteran Angels closer Troy Percival departed as a free agent which allowed Rodriguez to become the Angels' full-time closer. Rodríguez ended the season 2–5 with a 2.67 ERA in 66 relief appearances and tied the American League lead in saves with 45.

Rodriguez got his first two 2 career postseason saves during the 2005 American League Division Series as the Angels won the division series against the Yankees in 5 games. He got one save in the 2005 American League Championship Series, which the Angels lost to the Chicago White Sox in 5 games.

Rodriguez improved on his share of the 2005 American League saves title by leading the Majors in 2006 with 47 saves, one more than the National League leader Trevor Hoffman and six more than American League runner-up Bobby Jenks. On September 10 against the Toronto Blue Jays, he became the youngest closer in Major League Baseball history, at the age 24 years and 246 days, to accumulate 100 career saves. He accomplished this feat a year younger than the previous record holder, Gregg Olson. Rodriguez held this record until April 10, 2018, when Toronto Blue Jays closer Roberto Osuna acquired his 100th career save. Osuna, at the age of 23 years and 62 days, accomplished the feat about a year and a half younger than Rodriguez.

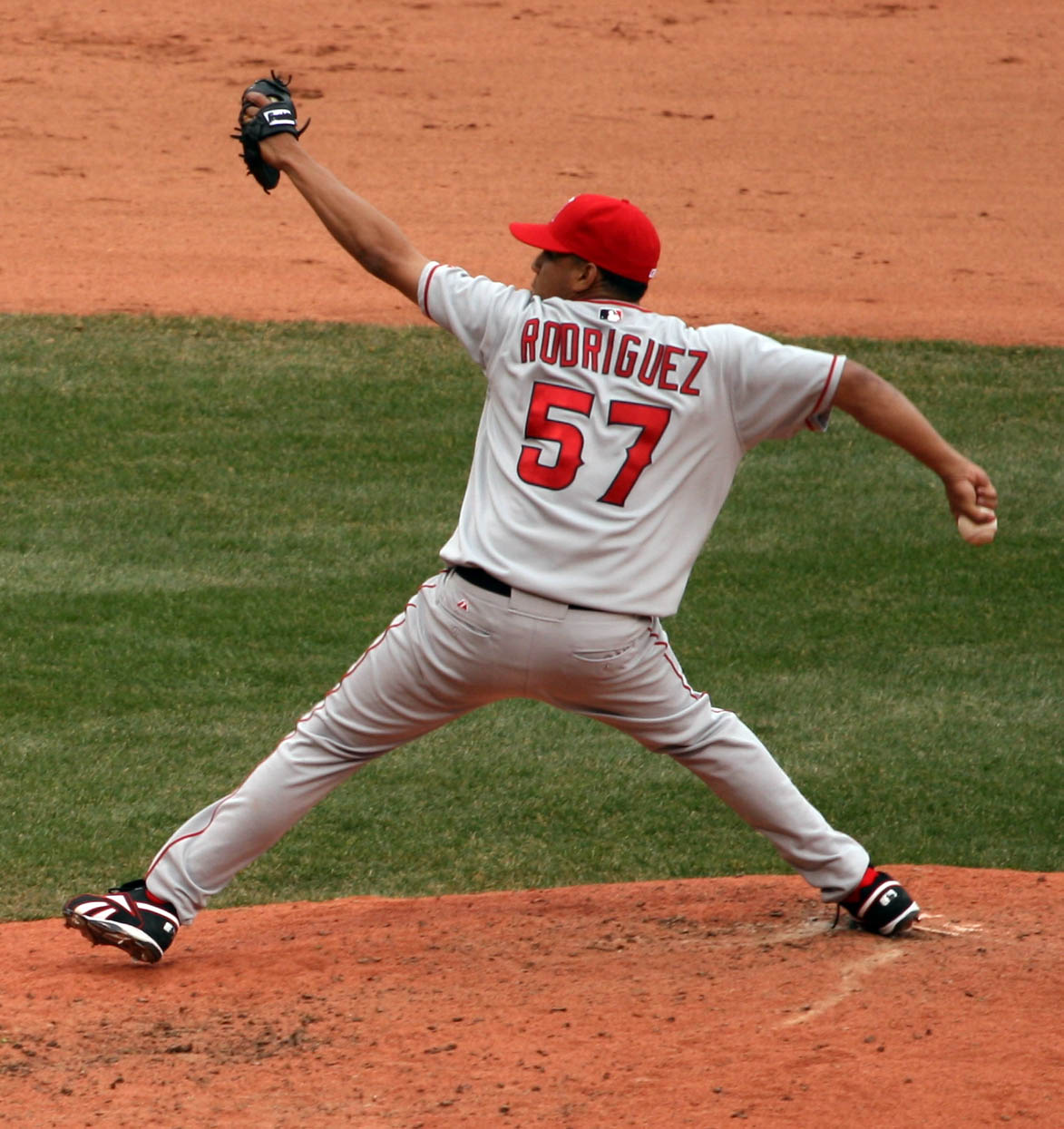
Rodríguez pitching for the Los Angeles Angels of Anaheim in 2007

At the 2007 All-Star Game in San Francisco, Rodriguez was named as one of three Angels to represent the club, along with teammates Vladimir Guerrero and John Lackey. Rodriguez recorded the save as the American League defeated the National League, 5–4. Rodriguez finished the 2007 season 5–2 with a 1.73 ERA and 40 saves in 64 relief appearances.

In the 2007 American League Division Series against the Boston Red Sox, Rodriguez pitched only 1/3 of an inning with an ERA accumulating 54.00. In Game 2 Rodriguez gave up a three-run walk-off home run to Manny Ramirez as the Red Sox won the game 6–3. The Angels eventually lost the division series to the Red Sox in just 3 games.

==== 2008: Single season saves record ====
Rodríguez received his second career Delivery Man of the Month Award after posting 11 saves in 12 appearances during the month of June. Rodríguez set a major league record by recording his 35th save before the All-Star Break, breaking the previous record of 34 set by John Smoltz in 2003. He was a member of the American League All-Star Team for the third time and made a brief appearance in the game, facing two batters while walking one. On August 20, 2008, he set both his and the Angels single season record with his 48th save. With his 50th save on August 24, 2008, Rodríguez became the first relief pitcher to reach that number since Mariano Rivera in 2004 and the ninth overall. He was also the youngest pitcher to ever reach that number at 26 years, 7 months, and 17 days. In addition, he reached that milestone in 129 team games, faster than any pitcher in history. With three saves during the week of August 18–24, including the milestone of number 50, Rodríguez was awarded the American League Player of the Week for the first time in his career.

On September 2, 2008, Rodríguez saved his 200th career game (54th of the season), becoming the youngest player in history to reach that number. On September 10, 2008, while facing the New York Yankees, Rodríguez saved his 56th game of the season and clinched the American League Western Division title for the Angels. On September 11, 2008, while facing the Seattle Mariners, Rodríguez saved his 57th game of the season, tying Bobby Thigpen's 1990 major league record.

On September 13, 2008, while again facing the Mariners, Rodríguez recorded his 58th save of the season, setting a new MLB record. On September 20, 2008, Rodríguez became the first pitcher to reach 60 saves in a season when he closed out a 7–3 victory against the Texas Rangers.

Rodríguez finished his record-setting 2008 regular season performance with 62 saves in 69 opportunities, appearing in an AL-leading 76 games. It was his fourth consecutive season of recording at least 40 saves. He finished third in AL Cy Young Award voting and sixth in AL Most Valuable Player Award voting.

The Angels again faced the Red Sox in the 2008 American League Division Series. Rodriguez lost a game and the Angels would lose the series to the Red Sox in four games.

=== New York Mets (2009–2011) ===
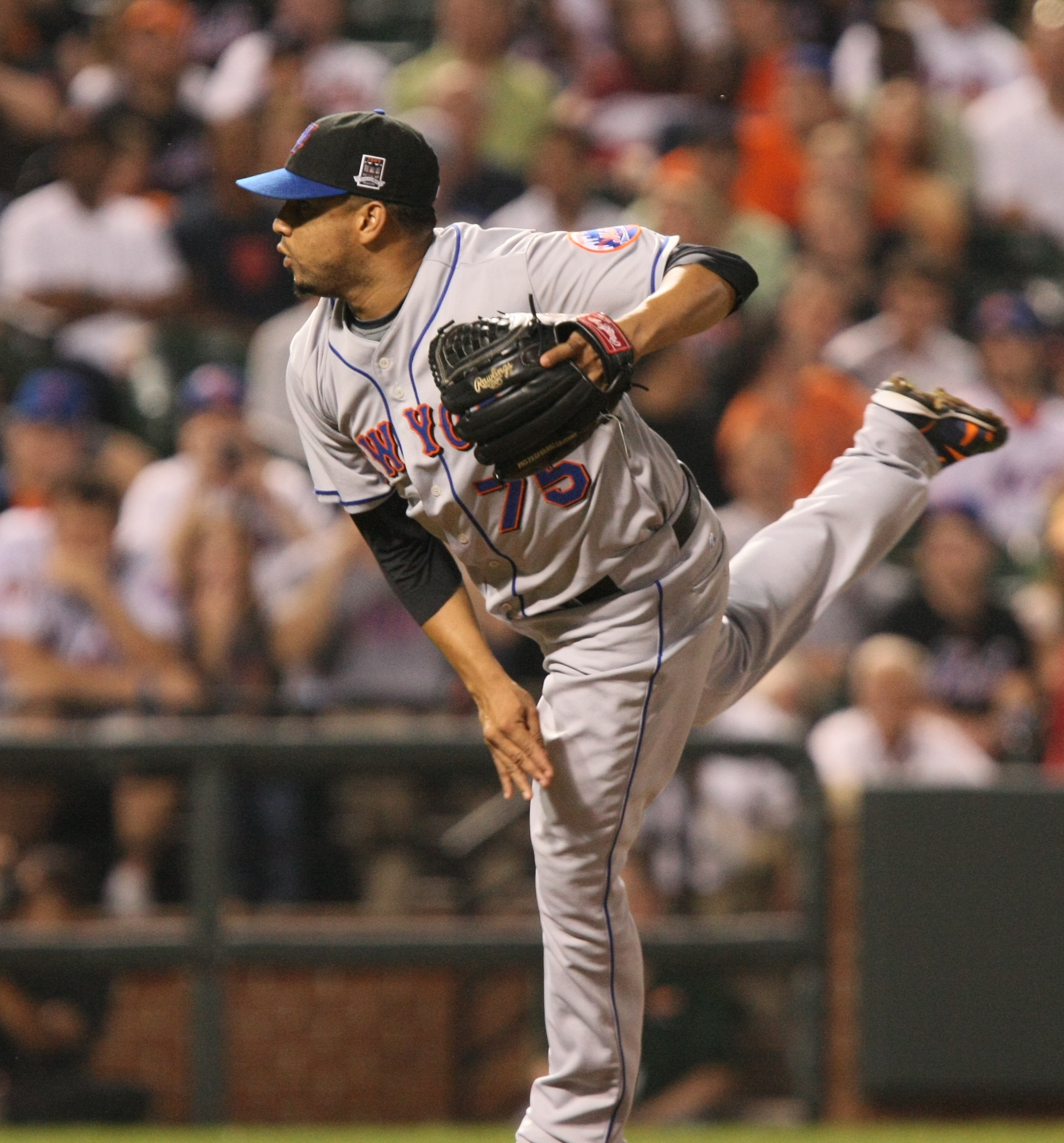
Rodríguez pitching for the New York Mets in 2009

On December 10, 2008, Rodríguez signed a three-year, $37 million contract with the New York Mets. Rodríguez, who had worn number 57 for his entire career, switched to number 75, as Mets ace Johan Santana wore number 57 at the time. On April 6, 2009, Rodríguez recorded his first save as a Met against the Cincinnati Reds.

On May 24, 2009, Rodríguez suffered a back injury and was taken to a local Boston hospital where he was given medication for the pain. He returned to the team the next day.

On June 13, 2009, New York Yankees reliever Brian Bruney criticized Rodríguez, calling his antics on the mound "unbelievable" and saying that Rodriguez has "got a tired act". During batting practice, the following day Rodríguez confronted Bruney on the field, pointing and shouting at him before teammates from both sides separated the two.

He was selected to play in the 2009 All-Star game and pitched a scoreless 9th inning.

On September 30, 2009, Rodríguez surrendered a walk-off grand slam to Justin Maxwell to cap a five-run ninth inning that lifted the Washington Nationals to a 7–4 victory over the Mets. This made him the first pitcher to allow two walk-off grand slams in one season since Lee Smith did in 1995 (on August 7, Rodriguez surrendered a grand slam to Everth Cabrera with no outs to cap another five-run ninth inning that gave the San Diego Padres a 6–2 win over the Mets).

Rodríguez finished the 2009 season 3–6 with a 3.71 ERA and 35 saves converted out of 42 opportunities. It was his fifth consecutive season of 30 or more saves.

In August 2010, the Mets suspended Rodriguez following an altercation that led to an arrest. The team placed him on the team's restricted list for two days, which meant he would forfeit two games' salary. Rodríguez required season-ending surgery for a torn ligament in his right thumb; the injury may have been sustained during the altercation. The Mets suspended Rodríguez indefinitely, preventing him from attending or performing any activity with the team, as well as having his pay suspended until he was physically able to perform again.

During his suspension-shortened 2010 season, Rodriguez appeared in 53 games going 4–2 with a 2.20 ERA and 25 saves.

=== Milwaukee Brewers (2011–2013) ===
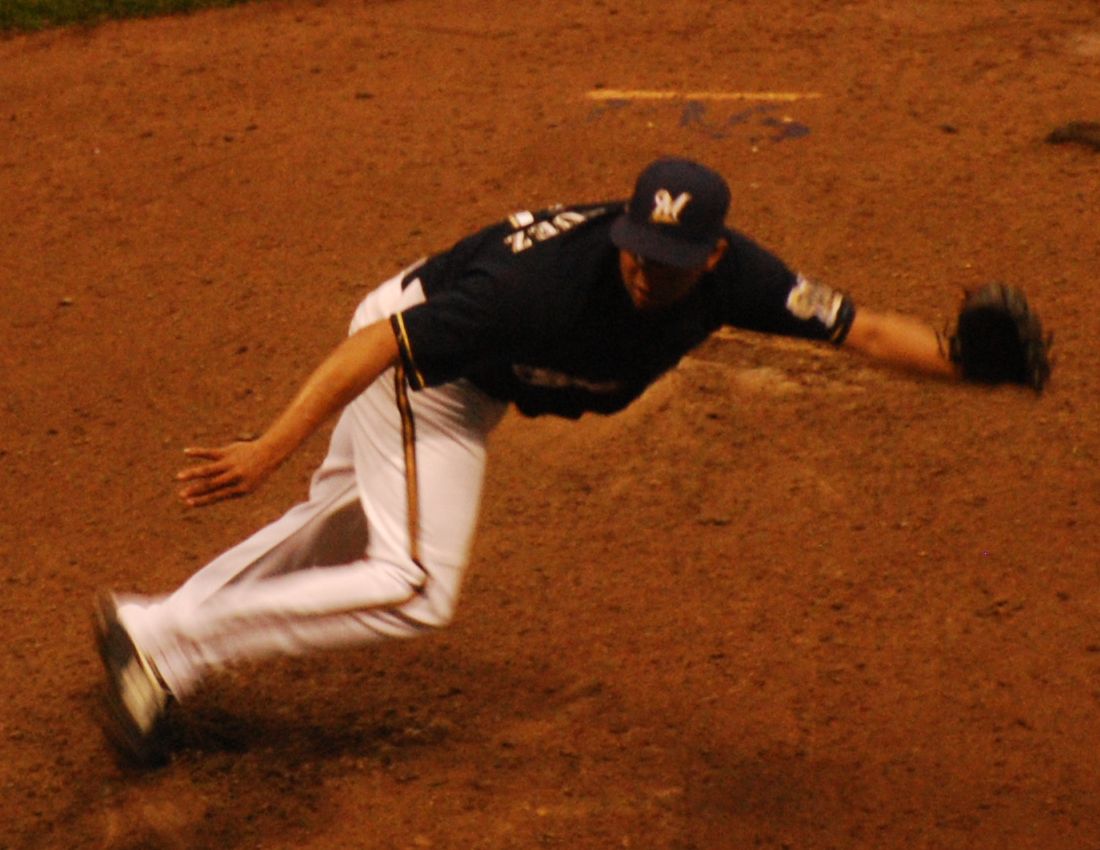
Rodríguez with the Brewers in the 2011 NLCS

Rodriguez started the 2011 season with 42 relief appearances going 2–2 with a 3.16 ERA and 23 saves.

On July 12, 2011, immediately following the All-Star Game, Rodríguez was traded to the Milwaukee Brewers along with cash, for Adrian Rosario and Danny Herrera. The Associated Press noted the Brewers had two potential closers in Rodríguez and their existing closer, John Axford. Rodríguez expressed his unhappiness in September to being used as the setup man to Axford. Axford finished the season with a streak of 43 consecutive save opportunities converted. In 31 games for the Brewers, Rodríguez was 4–0 with a 1.86 ERA. Overall for the 2011 season, he was 6–2 with a 2.64 ERA in 73 appearances. He had 23 saves, all with the Mets. Through 2011, he was 4th among all active pitchers in career saves (291) and games finished (445), and 8th in fielding percentage (.970).

Rodriguez made two appearances in the 2011 NLDS vs the Arizona Diamondbacks and struck out four. The Brewers won the series against the Diamondbacks in five games. He appeared in three games of the 2011 NLCS vs the St. Louis Cardinals. His ERA during the series was 3.00 and his new team of the Brewers would eventually lose the series to the Cardinals in six games.

In January 2012, Rodríguez signed a one-year, $8 million contract with the Brewers through arbitration. The Brewers again planned to have Rodríguez and Axford in the bullpen, shifting between the two depending on who has been struggling of late. In 2012, Rodriguez made a career high of 78 relief appearances going 2–7 with a 4.38 ERA and only 3 saves.

On October 29, 2012, the Brewers granted Rodriguez free agency. They re-signed him to a minor league deal on April 17, 2013, worth $2 million plus incentives if he made the major league team. After a brief stint at the Brewers' spring training complex, Rodriguez joined the Brewers. He appeared in 25 games, going 1–1 with a 1.09 ERA and 10 saves before being traded in July to the Baltimore Orioles.

=== Baltimore Orioles (2013) ===
On July 23, 2013, the Brewers traded Rodríguez to the Baltimore Orioles for minor league prospect Nicky Delmonico. Rodríguez struggled in his Orioles tenure, posting a 4.50 ERA in 23 appearances with the team. Overall in 2013, combined with both teams, he made 48 total relief appearances with a 3–2 record, a 2.70 ERA, and 10 saves.

=== Second stint with the Brewers (2014–2015) ===
On February 7, 2014, Rodríguez signed a one-year deal to return to the Milwaukee Brewers. Rodriguez was named the Brewers closer to start the 2014 season. On July 6, Rodriguez was selected as an All Star for the 5th time in his career, and the first time since 2009. On August 28, Rodriguez recorded his 1,000th career strikeout in a game against the San Diego Padres, becoming the ninth player among the Top 20 career saves leaders to also record at least 1,000 strikeouts. Rodriguez finished his 2014 campaign posting a 5–5 record with a 3.04 ERA, 73 strikeouts, and converting 44 saves in 49 opportunities. During the season, he rose to tenth place on the all-time saves list.

On February 27, 2015, the Brewers re-signed Rodriguez a two-year, $13 million deal. During the season, Rodríguez moved up three places on the all-time MLB saves list. On June 8, Rodríguez recorded his 359th career save, moving him past Troy Percival and into ninth place on the all-time list. On July 17, he recorded his 368th career save, passing Jeff Reardon for eighth place on the list. On August 19, Rodríguez recorded save number 378, passing Joe Nathan for seventh place on the all-time list, while also making him the major leagues' active career saves leader. He finished the season with a 1–3 record and a 2.21 ERA. He made 55 relief appearances and had 38 saves in 40 save chances.

=== Detroit Tigers (2016–2017) ===
On November 18, 2015, Rodríguez was traded to the Detroit Tigers in exchange for Javier Betancourt and Manny Piña. During the 2015–16 offseason, Rodríguez contracted the Zika virus while in his native Venezuela. He said it took two months before he "ultimately felt like himself again" and he still felt lingering effects in spring training.

On May 24, Rodríguez recorded his 400th career save, becoming just the sixth pitcher in Major League Baseball history to reach the milestone.

On August 29, Rodríguez recorded his 423rd career save, passing Billy Wagner for fifth all-time in saves. On September 5, Rodríguez recorded his 425th career save, passing John Franco for fourth place on the all-time saves list.

Rodríguez appeared in 61 games for the 2016 Tigers, posting a 3.24 ERA with 44 saves in 49 save chances. The season saves total is the second most for a Tiger pitcher in franchise history, trailing only the 49 saves recorded by José Valverde in 2011.

Following the 2016 season, the Tigers exercised the $6 million club option to bring back Rodríguez for the 2017 season.

Rodríguez began the season as the Tigers closer. On May 9, 2017, manager Brad Ausmus announced that Rodríguez was being demoted from his closer role after blowing his fourth save of the young season, which included blown saves in back-to-back games on May 6 and 7. Justin Wilson replaced Rodríguez as the team's closer. After being demoted from the closer role, Rodríguez continued to struggle, allowing seven runs in 4 2/3 innings, including two home runs. The Tigers released Rodríguez on June 23. During the season he registered a 2–5 record with a 7.82 ERA, and 1.658 WHIP, while allowing nine home runs in 25 1/3 innings.

=== Washington Nationals ===
On July 5, 2017, Rodríguez signed a minor league deal with the Washington Nationals, and was assigned to the Harrisburg Senators of the Class AA Eastern League. After pitching five innings, he was released by the Nationals on July 14.

=== Philadelphia Phillies ===
On January 29, 2018, Rodríguez signed a minor league deal with the Philadelphia Phillies with an invite to spring training. He was released on March 24.

=== Long Island Ducks ===
On April 30, 2018, Rodríguez signed with the Long Island Ducks of the independent Atlantic League of Professional Baseball. He became a free agent following the 2018 season. In 44 games 42.1 innings of relief he went 2–1 with a 2.76 ERA with 42 strikeouts and 27 saves.

=== Acereros de Monclova ===
On June 11, 2019, Rodríguez signed with the Acereros de Monclova of the Mexican League. He was released on July 13, 2019. In 10 games 8.1 innings of relief he went 0–0 with a 4.32 ERA and 9 strikeouts.

=== Hall of Fame consideration ===
Rodriguez first became eligible for the Hall of Fame in the 2023 Election. He gained 10.8% of the vote his first year. He fell to 7.8 percent in 2024 and rebounded to 10.2% in 2025. A player must gain 75% of the vote to be elected and stay above 5% to remain on the ballot.

== Pitching style ==
Rodríguez threw four pitches. He progressed through the minor leagues and into the major leagues throwing a hard four-seam fastball that averaged 95 mph in 2007, but the pitch settled into the 89–92 mph range through the 2016 season. He also threw a two-seam fastball at 88–91 mph. His off-speed pitches were a curveball at 76–79 mph and a changeup at 82–85 mph. He used his changeup more against left-handed hitters. It had a whiff rate of 48% since 2007, the third-highest among all changeups thrown by relief pitchers.

Rodríguez was a strikeout pitcher throughout his career, compiling an average of 10.6 strikeouts per 9 innings pitched through the 2016 season.

== Personal life ==
Rodríguez is a practitioner of the Santería religion.

On August 11, 2010, Rodríguez was arrested after allegedly assaulting Carlos Peña, the father of his girlfriend Daian Pena, after the Mets lost a game at Citi Field. Rodríguez was reportedly upset that Peña made disparaging remarks about Rodríguez's mother. Rodríguez remained in police custody at Citi Field on a charge of third-degree assault, a misdemeanor in the state of New York, and was arraigned that afternoon. He was released without bail, and ordered by a judge to stay away from his girlfriend and her father. On September 22, 2010, Rodriguez was back in Queens Criminal Court facing seven counts of criminal contempt after sending numerous text messages to Daian Pena in violation of the order of protection. The judge imposed bail of $7,500, which Rodriguez posted.

Rodriguez was charged with domestic violence in Wisconsin relating to a September 17, 2012 incident in which he allegedly hit and kicked the mother of his child. Charges were subsequently dropped against Rodriguez when the victim and another witness, a housekeeper, both returned to Venezuela and did not respond to the district attorney on the case.

== See also ==
- List of Major League Baseball annual saves leaders
- List of Major League Baseball players from Venezuela
- List of Major League Baseball career saves leaders
