= 2010 Houston Astros season =

2010 Houston Astros
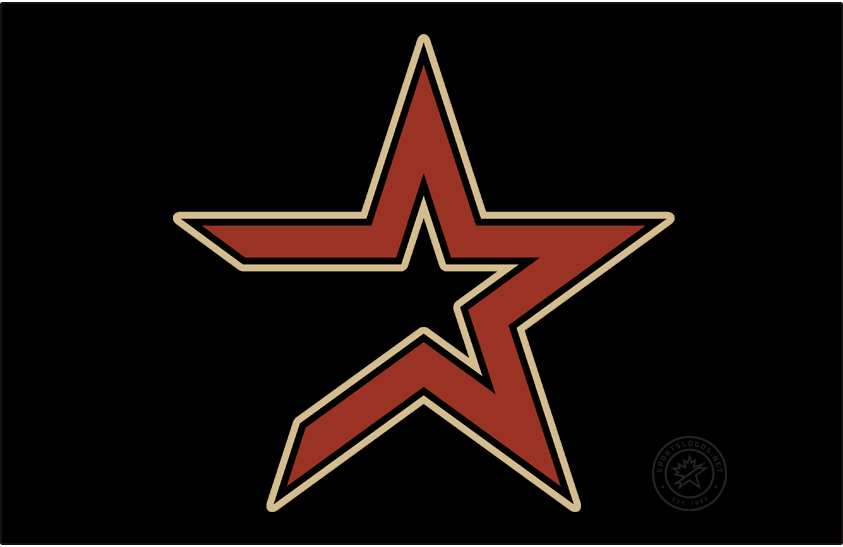
- League: National League
- Division: Central
- Ballpark: Minute Maid Park
- City: Houston, Texas
- Record: 76–86 (.469)
- Divisional place: 4th
- Owners: Drayton McLane, Jr.
- General managers: Ed Wade
- Managers: Brad Mills
- Television: Fox Sports Houston; KTXH; Bill Brown, Jim Deshaies
- Radio: KTRH; Milo Hamilton, Brett Dolan, Dave Raymond; KLAT (Spanish)
- Stats: ESPN.com; Baseball Reference

The 2010 Houston Astros season was the 49th season for the Major League Baseball (MLB) franchise located in Houston, Texas, their 46th as the Astros, 49th in the National League (NL), 17th in the NL Central division, and 11th at Minute Maid Park. The Astros entered the season with a 74–88 record, in fifth place in the NL Central, and 17 games behind the division-champion St. Louis Cardinals.

The 2010 season was the first for Brad Mills as manager, the 19th in franchise history, succeeding Dave Clark. Over the Winter Meetings, broadcaster Milo Hamilton was recognized with the King of Baseball award for a career of distinguished service to the sport.

The Astros began their season on April 5. Pitcher Roy Oswalt made the final of eight consecutive Opening Day starts, a club record. They hosted the San Francisco Giants, who won, 5–2. In the first round of the MLB draft, Houston chose center fielder Delino DeShields Jr. as the eighth overall selection, and pitcher Mike Foltynewicz at 19th overall.

Center fielder Michael Bourn represented the Astros and played for the National League at the MLB All-Star Game, his first career selection.

The Astros concluded the season with a 76–86 record, in fourth place in the NL Central and 15 games behind the division-champion Cincinnati Reds. For the first time since 1990–1991, Houston produced consecutive losing seasons.

Following the season, Bourn was also recognized with a second consecutive Gold Glove Award.

== Offseason ==
The Astros concluded the 2009 campaign with a 74–88 (.457) record for fifth place in the NL Central, and 11 games behind the division-champion St. Louis Cardinals. This was Houston's fourth consecutive season missing the playoffs, with their last appearance ended in the 2005 World Series. The Astros had not missed four or more consecutive playoffs since the 1987 to 1996 seasons. Miguel Tejada led the National League with 46 doubles, duplicating Lance Berkman's feat at as league leader from the year prior. Center fielder Michael Bourn was accorded with the Gold Glove Award for outfielders and led the National League in stolen base (52).

== Regular season ==
=== Summary ===
==== April ====
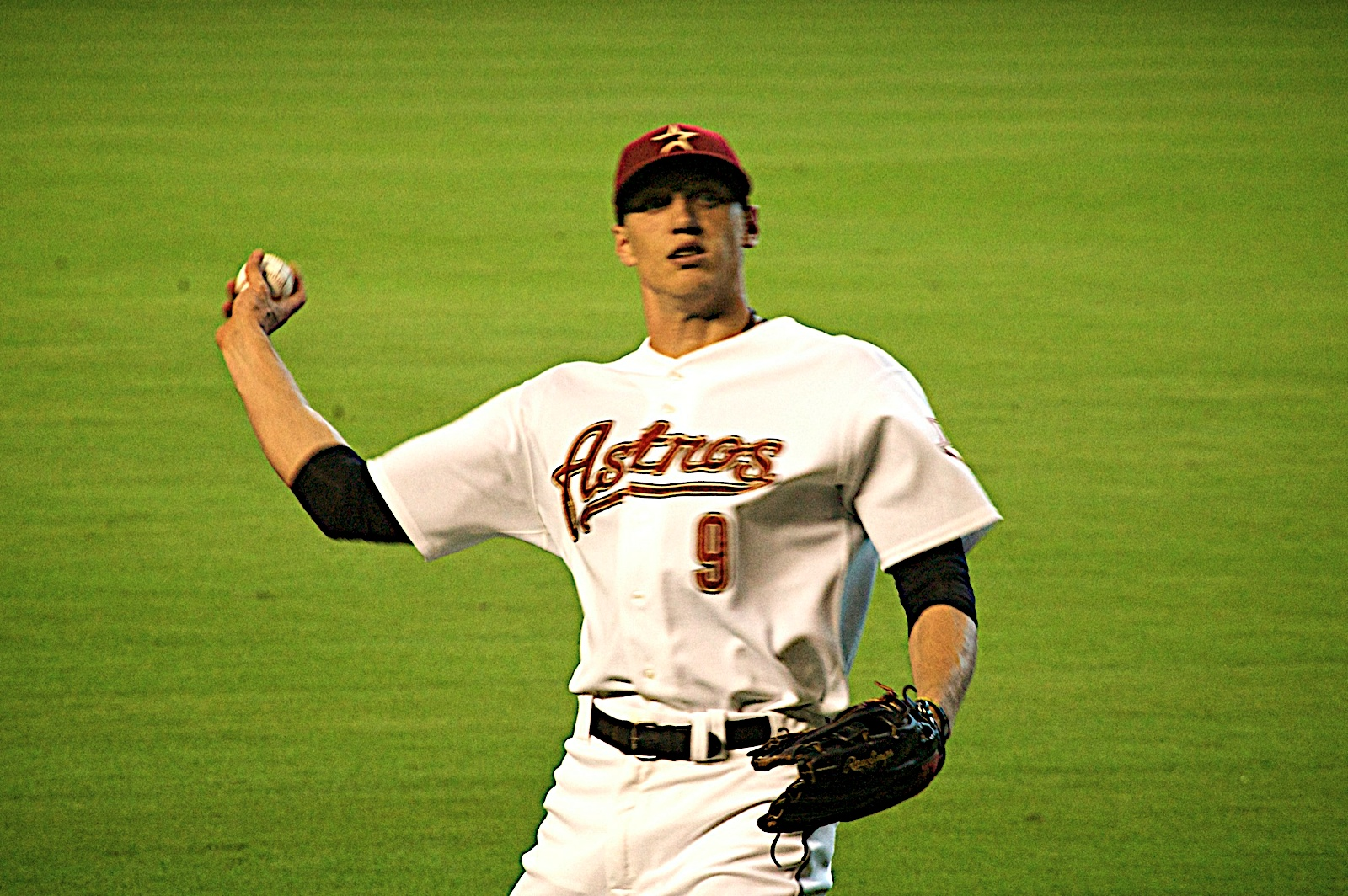
Outfielder Hunter Pence on defense.

Opening Day starting lineup
Uniform	Player	Position
21	Michael Bourn	Center fielder
3	Kazuo Matsui	Second baseman
9	Hunter Pence	Right fielder
45	Carlos Lee	Left fielder
27	Geoff Blum	First baseman
77	Pedro Feliz	Third baseman
46	J. R. Towles	Catcher
12	Tommy Manzella	Shortstop
44	Roy Oswalt	Pitcher
Venue: Minute Maid Park • Final: San Francisco 5, Houston 2 Sources:

The Astros commenced 2010 challenging the San Francisco Giants at home for Opening Day, on April 5, but lost 5–2 as two-time defending Cy Young Award winner Tim Lincecum worked for the Giants. Lincecum hurled 7 shutout innings and earned the victory for the Giants. Roy Oswalt made his eighth successive Opening Day start, extending his club record for Astros hurlers. The Astros would drop the second one as well 4–0 to Barry Zito, who pitched six shutout innings, and got swept at home the next game 10–4 after giving up 2 runs in the eighth and 4 in the ninth.

They lost to J. A. Happ, who pitched five shutout innings and would be traded in July to the Astros, and the Philadelphia Phillies 8–0 in the first game. The Astros had a 5–4 lead going into the 7th inning in the second game, but gave up 3 runs in the 7th and 2 in the 9th and lost 9–6. In the final game of the series, the Phillies' Roy Halladay pitched a complete game allowing only one run to win 2–1, to sweep the Astros and give them a six-game losing streak.

Going on the road for the first time this season, the Astros visited Busch Stadium to face the St. Louis Cardinals for a three-game series. The Astros lost 5–0 in game one of the series, as Adam Wainwright pitched 8 shutout innings to get the win. In the second game, the Astros scored 1 in the first and the Cardinals scored 2 in the first. Those would be the only runs scored in the game, as the Cardinals won 2–1. The Astros were in danger of being swept by the Cardinals, until the Astros won 5–1 on the back of Bud Norris's 5 innings, allowing only 1 unearned run. This win snapped an 8-game losing streak to begin the season, in which they failed to score in 3 of the games and scored 1 run or less 5 times.

The Astros journeyed to Wrigley Field in Chicago to face the Cubs, but dropped the first contest of the set, 7–2, following a 6-run implosion in the bottom of the 7th. The Astros won 4–3 in the next game, with Roy Oswalt throwing 7 shutout innings. In the next game, the Astros won a 10-inning game in the series finale 3–2, rallying for 1 run each in the 8th, 9th, and 10th innings, with the winning run scoring on a Pedro Feliz sacrifice fly, to win their first series of the season.

The Astros would head back home for 9 games, starting with 3 against the Florida Marlins. The Astros won the first game 7–5, scoring 3 in the bottom of the 8th to break a 4–4 tie. In the next game, the Astros won 5–4, on a Geoff Blum 2-RBI triple to rally the Astros from a 4–3 deficit. In the next game, the Marlins won 5–1 after putting up 3 runs in the 1st, snapping the Astros's 4-game winning streak. The Astros would then face the Pittsburgh Pirates at home, and won the first game 4–3. In the next game, a Lance Berkman line drive would hit the pitcher Chris Jakubauskas in the head. Fortunately, he would be fine, after being hospitalized. The Astros would win that game 5–2. In the final game of the series, the Astros put up 10 runs and won 10–3, despite Pittsburgh outhitting the Astros 14–10, to secure the Astros first series sweep of the season, and their third consecutive series win. The Astros outscored the Pirates 19–8 on the backs of great pitching by Roy Oswalt, Wandy Rodríguez, and Brett Myers, who combined to give up only 5 earned runs over 20.1 innings pitched over the course of the series. After the last game, the Astros had won 7 out of their last 8 games and were 8–10, in 3rd place in the NL Central, and only 3 games back from the Cardinals. Unfortunately for the Astros, this hot streak would end soon. In the next game against the Cincinnati Reds, the Astros lost 6–2. In the next game, the Astros rallied for 3 in the 9th but still lost 6–4. In the series finale, the Astros lost 4–2, being swept for the third time in seven series this season.

Going to Turner Field to face the Atlanta Braves, and lost 4–2 again to conclude April with an 8–14 mark, and a four-game losing streak.

==== May ====
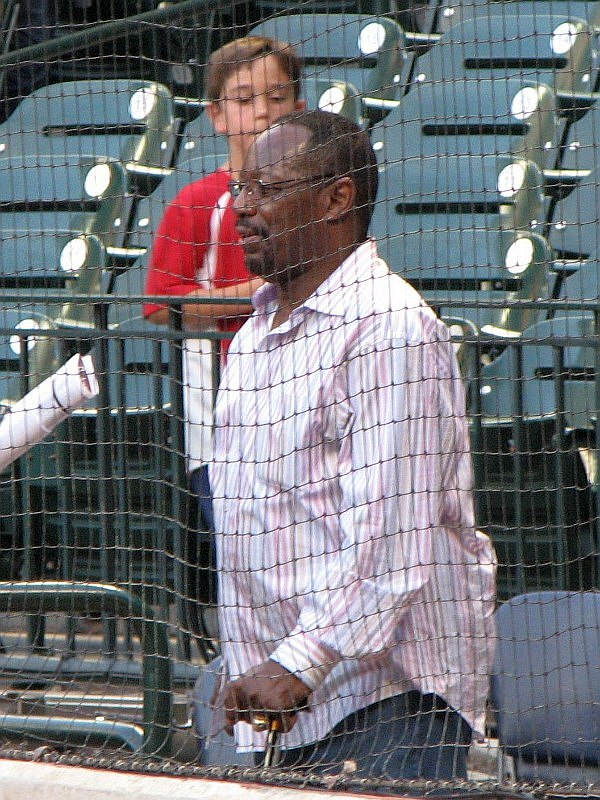
Former Astros outfielder Jimmy Wynn at Minute Maid Park in 2010.

The Astros would continue to struggle into May, losing 10–1 to the Braves. In the series finale, the Braves finished the sweep by winning 7–1, giving the Astros their sixth loss in a row. Going back home, the Astros lost to the Arizona Diamondbacks 9–1, failing to score more than one run for the third consecutive game. In the second game, the Diamondbacks won 1–0 from 6.2 shutout innings from Ian Kennedy. This gave the Astros an eight-game losing streak, during which they had been outscored 45–13. In game three, the Astros walked-off in the bottom of the 9th off a 2-run home run from Carlos Lee, giving the Astros a 4–2 win. It was Lee's first home run of the season after 27 games. In the series finale, the Astros lost 6–3 after falling 5–0 back after the Diamondbacks finished hitting in the fourth inning.

In the first game against the San Diego Padres, Mat Latos pitched eight shutout innings allowing only two hits as the Astros lost 7–0, and only recording 3 hits. The second game was a pitcher's duel, with the Astros losing 2–1, and the starters, Jon Garland for the Padres and Felipe Paulino for the Astros, combined to allow one earned run in 14 innings between them. The Astros avoided the sweep with a 4–3 win in 11 innings, on a Hunter Pence walk-off hit to drive in Berkman.

The Astros went to St. Louis to play the Cardinals and won the first game 6–3, thanks in part to a 4-run 7th inning. The Astros won for the third straight game 9–6 in the next game with another big inning, the one a 5-run 4th inning. The Astros got their third game in a row in which they scored four or more in an inning, winning 4–1 with Pence getting a 3-run home run.

After the sweep, the Astros traveled to AT&T Park to face the Giants with a four-game winning streak, but lost 9–3 in the opener. The second game was a rematch of opening day pitchers Lincecum and Oswalt, with Lincecum winning 2–1 off of a 2-run home run off the bat of Juan Uribe. The Giants won another close game, 4–3, against the Astros to seal the three-game sweep.

The Astros went to Dodger Stadium to play the Los Angeles Dodgers, losing the first game, 6–2. Bud Norris would get hit with six earned runs in the next game, as the Astros lost 7–3 to conclude the short two-game series, with the Astros getting swept for the second consecutive series. The Astros came back home to face the Colorado Rockies for another two-game series, and won the first game 7–3, with a 4-run 8th involving a Jeff Keppinger 3-run double. In the next game, the Astros only got three hits for the second time this month, with Ubaldo Jiménez starting and going seven innings, as the Rockies won 4–0 for the series split.

The Astros kicked off interleague play against the Tampa Bay Rays, winning 2–1 despite a complete game thrown by Rays starter Matt Garza. The Rays would win game two of the series 4–2, though, to tie the series at one each. In contrast to the first two games, which were low-scoring, the series finale was a high-scorer, with the Rays winning 10–6.

The Astros went to Miller Park to play the Milwaukee Brewers, losing 6–1 against former Astro Randy Wolf. The Astros got a great start from Oswalt, who pitched eight shutout innings, and won 5–0. The Astros lost the series finale 4–3 in 10 innings, with Rickie Weeks drawing a walk-off walk against Matt Lindstrom to win the game, after Lindstrom gave up the game-tying run in the bottom of the 9th.

The Astros traveled to Great American Ball Park to face the Reds, losing 15–6 against Sam LeCure, who was making his Major League debut. The Reds continued to score runs next game, scoring 12 runs as the Reds won 12–2. In the next game, Paulino did what Wandy Rodríguez and Brian Moehler, who started the first two games, failed to do: shut down the Reds batters. Paulino pitched eight shutout innings but did not get the win as the Astros did not score until a Berkman 2-RBI double in the top of the 10th, as the Astros won 2–0.

To finish May, the Astros returned to Minute Maid Park but dropped a contest, 14–4, to Washington, with Oswalt being ejected in the 3rd inning. His replacement on the mound, Gustavo Chacín, homered off Luis Atilano in the fourth inning. Chacín's blast was both his first career home run and his first career hit. Moreover, it was Chacín's final major league at bat, becoming the first player in franchise history to do so during the regular season and 45th major leaguer with this distinction. (Note: Chacín's drive was the first of its kind by an Astros player during the regular season. The first player to homer for the club during his final major league at bat during either the regular season or playoffs was Chuck Carr, during Game 3 of 1997 National League Division Series, off John Smoltz.) Houston concluded the month having attained a 17–34 mark on the season, while their performance for the month of May was 9–20.

==== June ====
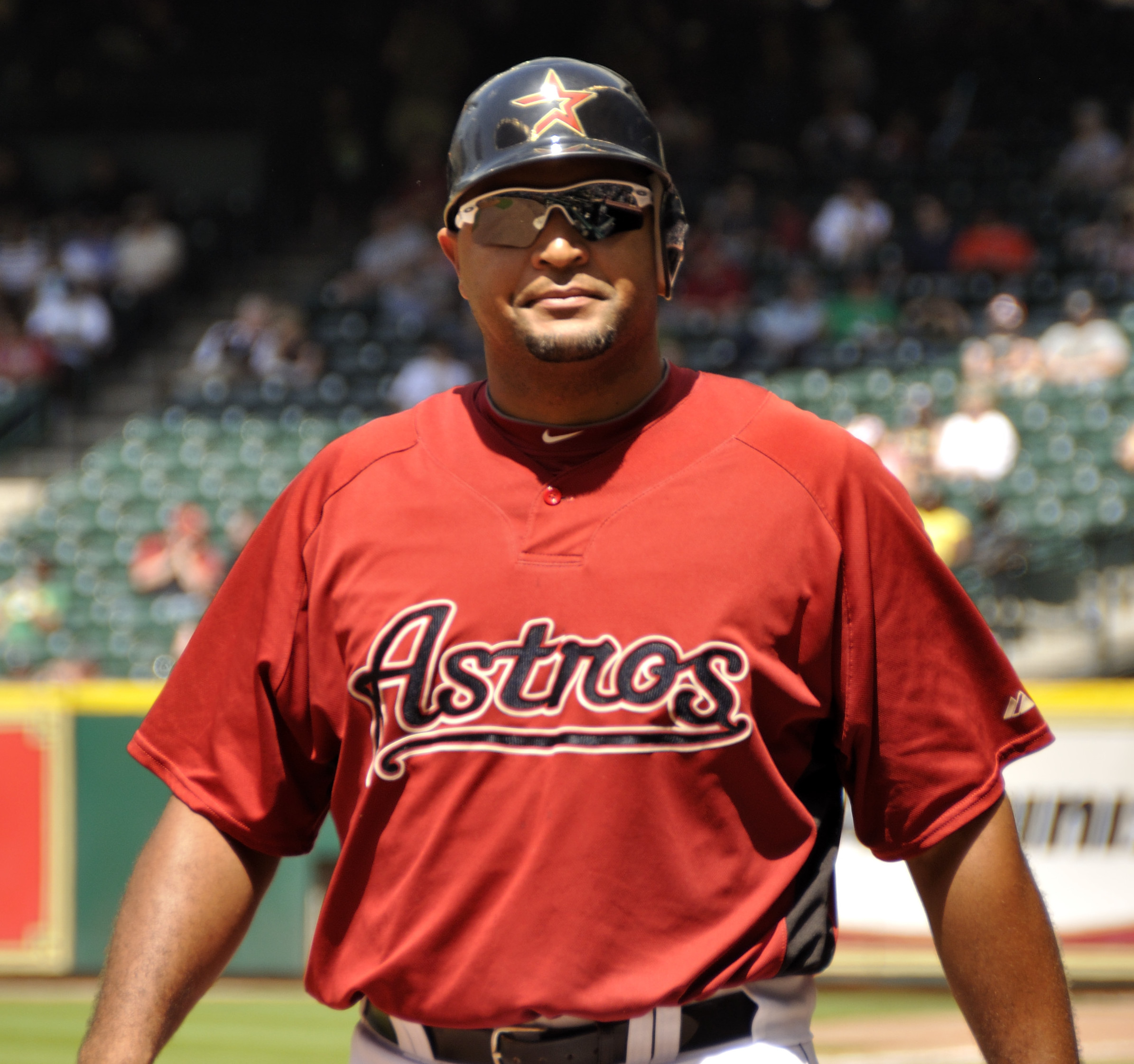
Astros outfielder Carlos Lee at Minute Maid Park.

On June 1, Berkman had five RBI, including the game-winning run to propel the Astros over the Washington Nationals, 8–7. Jeff Keppinger stroked three hits while Michael Bourn scored three runs.

On June 9, left fielder Carlos Lee belted his sixth grand slam as a member of the Astros, and 15th of his career, to pull into a three-way tie with Bob Aspromonte (1963–1966) and Jeff Bagwell (1998–2004), for the all-time franchise lead. Since joining Houston, it was Lee's second in extra innings which took over the lead from the Colorado Rockies, paralleling his walk-off grand slam on June 28, 2007. The blast made him the only major leaguer with three in extra innings. With the score tied 2–2 in the top of the tenth inning, Lee took Matt Belisle deep, driving in Tommy Manzella, Bourn, and Berkman for the 6−2 Astros lead at Coors Field. Wilton López retired the side during the bottom of the tenth, working around a Brad Hawpe single, to close out the win. Brandon Lyon (5–1) pitched the bottom of the ninth in relief to pick up the victory.

The club called up top prospects Jason Castro (catcher) and Chris Johnson (third baseman) on June 22, whom the Astros thrust into the starting lineup. The duo became fixtures and to made an impact the remainder of the season.

Two days after his major league debut, Jason Castro hit first major league home, off Matt Cain of the San Francisco Giants.

The Astros rebounded to win 8 of their first 10 games in June, but struggled during interleague play, going 2–10 against the American League (AL) in June to finish 14–14, their first non-losing month of the year.

==== July ====
The Astros parted ways with hitting coach Sean Berry at the All-Star break and replaced him with Jeff Bagwell, who stayed for the remainder of the season.

Center fielder Michael Bourne was selected as a reserve to the MLB All-Star Game, held at Angel Stadium. He went 0-for-1 as a reserve outfielder, while the National League were victorious, 3-to-1, over the American League (AL).

Within a span of 48 hours in late July, the Astros traded franchise icons Oswalt (Philadelphia Phillies) and Lance Berkman (New York Yankees) for a sum of 5 prospects, and ultimately the Astros went 13–11 in July. The Astros would go 34–27 after trading away Oswalt and Berkman.

==== August ====
After winning their final four games of July, Houston claimed victories in their first three of August for a season-high 7-game winning streak, capped by a season-high in runs scored 18–4 win over St. Louis on August 3. Infielder Ángel Sánchez led the scoring with career highs of both four hits and six RBI.

The Astros would have their best month of the year in August by going 17–12, including a four-game sweep of the Philadelphia Phillies, the first time the Phillies were swept in Citizens Bank Park.

==== September ====
For the week ended September 5, Hunter Pence hit .500 (11–for-22); five runs; two HR; nine RBI; 1.451 on-base plus slugging (OPS). He was named National League (NL) Player of the Week.

The Astros would experience their third consecutive winning month in September, going 14–13, however the poor months of April and May kept them out of contention down the stretch. They finished the season in Chicago to face the Cubs, losing 2 of 3, but still finishing 4th ahead of the Cubs.

==== Performance overview ====
Over the final four months of the season, Houston rallied for a 59–52 (.532) showing, the second-best mark in the division over that span.

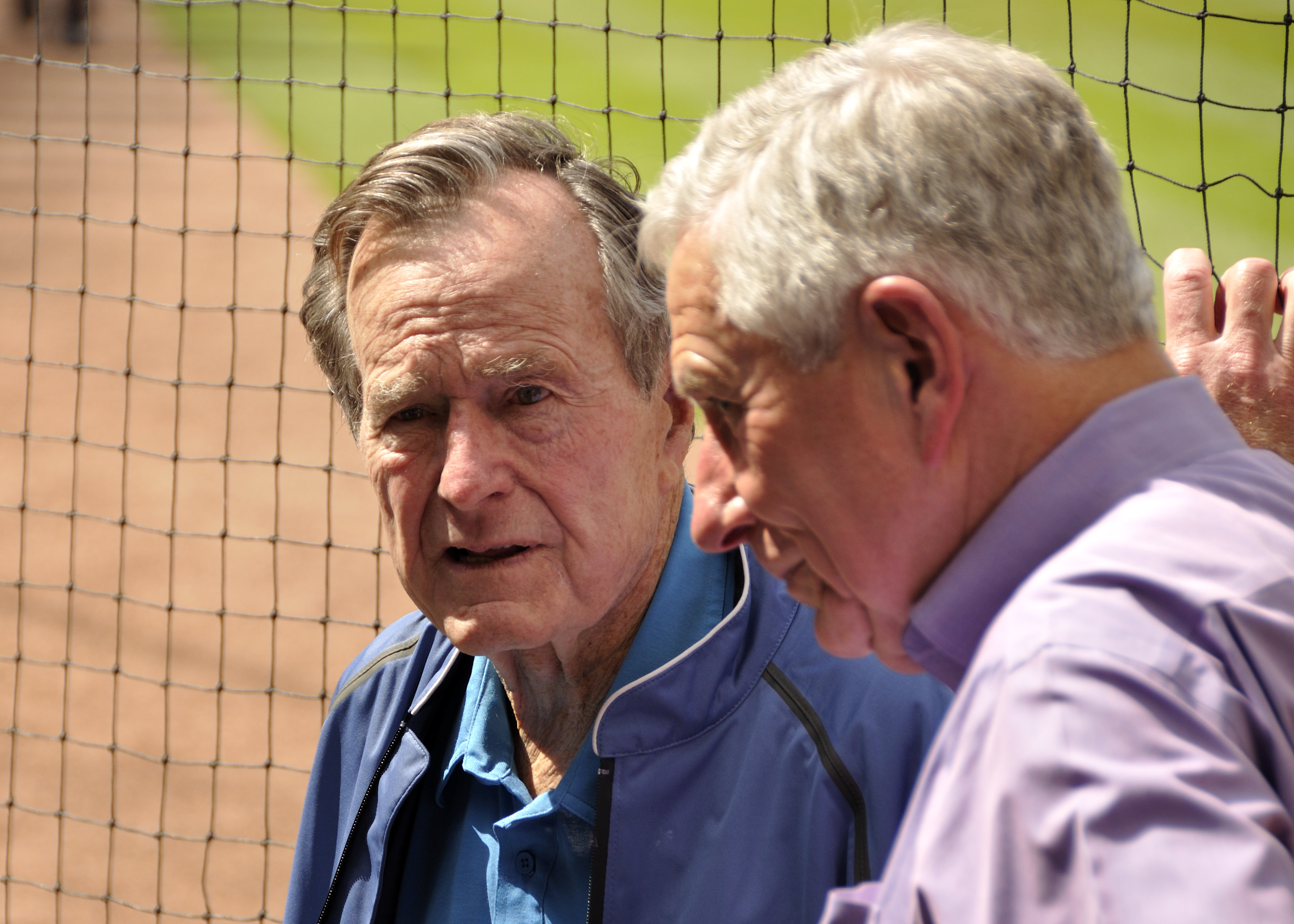
Former President George H. W. Bush and Drayton McLane, Jr..

The Astros concluded the 2010 campaign with an aggregate record of 76–86 (.469) for fourth place in the NL Central, trailing the division-champion Cincinnati Reds by 15 games. Though they improved by 2 victories from the year prior, Houston posted back-to-back losing chapters for the first time since 1990 to 1991. Moreover, this was the second of a span of six consecutive losing seasons through 2014, such a span the club had not produced since the inception of the expansion era in 1962 until 1968, during which they also lost 90 or more games every year.

The club continued their success on home field, posting the eighteen winning season of 19. In 2010, they went 42–39 (.519) at Minute Maid Park.

Center fielder Michael Bourn was recognized with a second straight Gold Glove Award for outfielders, the seventh among Astros outfielders, along with César Cedeño's five (1972–1976). Bourn was also Houston's first winner over consecutive seasons since catcher Brad Ausmus in 2001–2002. On the basepaths, Bourn ran away with the NL stolen base crown with 52, to become the first Astro to win twice, and was the only Astro to lead the league apart from Craig Biggio in 1994.

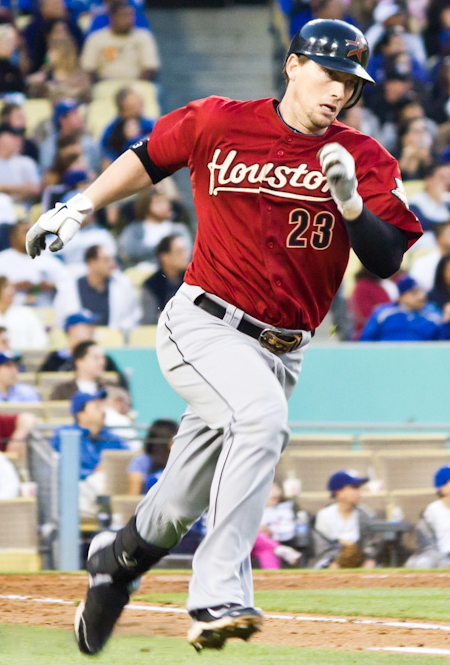
Rookie Chris Johnson running the bases.

Outfielder Hunter Pence swatted 25 home runs for the third consecutive campaign and was recognized with the club's Most Valuable Player (MVP) Award.

Newcomer Brett Myers tossed at least six innings pitched in each of his first 32 games started, which set a club record. He totaled a career-high 223 2/3 innings and was the choice for Houston Astros Pitcher of the Year. Myers led the club in innings, wins (14), and strikeouts (180), and starters in earned run average (3,14 ERA).

Over his final eighteen starts, left-hander Wandy Rodríguez went 8-2 and an NL-leading 2.03 ERA.

Relievers Matt Lindstrom (23 saves) and Brandon Lyon (20 saves) became the fifth teammate duo in major League history to aggregate at least 20 saves during the same season.

Third baseman Chris Johnson was named the club's Rookie of Year after leading National League rookies in batting at .308 (105 hits in 341 at bats), which also led the club, regardless of total plate appearances accrued.

=== League standings ===
==== National League Central ====
NL Central
Team	W	L	Pct.	GB	Home	Road
Cincinnati Reds	91	71	.562	—	49‍–‍32	42‍–‍39
St. Louis Cardinals	86	76	.531	5	52‍–‍29	34‍–‍47
Milwaukee Brewers	77	85	.475	14	40‍–‍41	37‍–‍44
Houston Astros	76	86	.469	15	42‍–‍39	34‍–‍47
Chicago Cubs	75	87	.463	16	35‍–‍46	40‍–‍41
Pittsburgh Pirates	57	105	.352	34	40‍–‍41	17‍–‍64

==== National League Wild Card ====
NL Wild Card standings

Division leaders
Team	W	L	Pct.
Philadelphia Phillies	97	65	.599
San Francisco Giants	92	70	.568
Cincinnati Reds	91	71	.562

Wild Card team (Top team qualifies for postseason)
Team	W	L	Pct.	GB
Atlanta Braves	91	71	.562	—
San Diego Padres	90	72	.556	1
St. Louis Cardinals	86	76	.531	5
Colorado Rockies	83	79	.512	8
Florida Marlins	80	82	.494	11
Los Angeles Dodgers	80	82	.494	11
New York Mets	79	83	.488	12
Milwaukee Brewers	77	85	.475	14
Houston Astros	76	86	.469	15
Chicago Cubs	75	87	.463	16
Washington Nationals	69	93	.426	22
Arizona Diamondbacks	65	97	.401	26
Pittsburgh Pirates	57	105	.352	34

==== Record versus opponents ====
National League

2010 National League record Source: MLB Standings Grid – 2010
Team	AZ	ATL	CHC	CIN	COL	FLA	HOU	LAD	MIL	NYM	PHI	PIT	SD	SF	STL	WSH	AL
Arizona	–	3–4	1–6	2–5	9–9	3–3	4–3	5–13	3–4	5–1	2–4	2–4	8–10	5–13	4–5	3–4	6–9
Atlanta	4–3	–	4–2	3–2	2–4	11–7	5–1	5–3	5–2	11–7	8–10	6–3	4–2	4–3	2–6	8–10	9–6
Chicago	6–1	2–4	–	4–12	2–3	4–2	7–11	3–4	9–6	3–4	4–2	5–10	3–5	2–5	9–6	4–2	8–10
Cincinnati	5–2	2–3	12–4	–	2–5	5–2	10–5	5–4	11–3	4–2	2–5	10–6	2–4	3–4	6–12	4–3	8–7
Colorado	9–9	4–2	3–2	5–2	–	3–4	2–4	7–11	5–4	3–3	1–6	3–4	12–6	9–9	3–4	5–3	9–6
Florida	3–3	7–11	2–4	2–5	4–3	–	3–3	4–2	4–4	12–6	5–13	6–2	3–6	2–5	3–2	13–5	7–8
Houston	3–4	1–5	11–7	5–10	4–2	3–3	–	2–4	8–7	3–4	4–3	11–4	2–5	2–7	10–5	4–4	3–12
Los Angeles	13–5	3–5	4–3	4–5	11–7	2–4	4–2	–	4–2	3–4	2–4	4–3	8–10	8–10	3–4	3–3	4–11
Milwaukee	4–3	2–5	6–9	3–11	4–5	4–4	7–8	2–4	–	5–2	1–5	13–5	3–4	2–5	8–7	4–2	9–6
New York	1–5	7–11	4–3	2–4	3–3	6–12	4–3	4–3	2–5	–	9–9	6–1	3–3	3–4	3–3	9–9	13–5
Philadelphia	4–2	10–8	2–4	5–2	6–1	13–5	3–4	4–2	5–1	9–9	–	2–4	5–2	3–3	4–4	12–6	10–8
Pittsburgh	4–2	3–6	10–5	6–10	4–3	2–6	4–11	3–4	5–13	1–6	4–2	–	0–6	2–4	6–9	1–5	2–13
San Diego	10–8	2–4	5–3	4–2	6–12	6–3	5–2	10–8	4–3	3–3	2–5	6–0	–	12–6	3–4	3–3	9–6
San Francisco	13–5	3–4	5–2	4–3	9–9	5–2	7–2	10–8	5–2	4–3	3–3	4–2	6–12	–	3–3	4–2	7–8
St. Louis	5–4	6–2	6–9	12–6	4–3	2–3	5–10	4–3	7–8	3–3	4–4	9–6	4–3	3–3	–	3–3	9–6
Washington	4–3	10–8	2–4	3–4	3–5	5–13	4–4	3–3	2–4	9–9	6–12	5–1	3–3	2–4	3–3	–	5–13

=== Game log ===
Legend
Astros win	Astros loss	All-Star Game	Game postponed	Clinched	Eliminated

"GB" legend
1st (NL Central)	Not in playoff berth	Tied for 1st (NL Central)

2010 Game Log (76–86) (Home: 42–39; Road: 34–47)
April (8–14)

#	Date	Opponent	Score	Win	Loss	Save	Attendance	Record	Rank	GB
1	April 5	Giants	2–5	Lincecum (1–0)	Oswalt (0–1)	Wilson (1)	43,836	0–1	3	–1
2	April 6	Giants	0–3	Zito (1–0)	Rodríguez (0–1)	Wilson (2)	24,237	0–2	6	–1½
3	April 7	Giants	4–10	Affeldt (1–0)	Gervacio (0–1)		21,599	0–3	6	–2½
4	April 9	Phillies	0–8	Happ (1–0)	Norris (0–1)		27,288	0–4	6	–3
5	April 10	Phillies	6–9	Moyer (1–0)	Lyon (0–1)		35,138	0–5	6	–4
6	April 11	Phillies	1–2	Halladay (2–0)	Oswalt (0–2)		28,619	0–6	6	–4
7	April 12	@ Cardinals	0–5	Wainwright (2–0)	Rodríguez (0–2)		46,918	0–7	6	–5
8	April 14	@ Cardinals	1–2	Penny (1–0)	Myers (0–1)	Franklin (3)	35,883	0–8	6	–6
9	April 15	@ Cardinals	5–1	Norris (1–1)	Lohse (0–1)		35,371	1–8	6	–5
10	April 16	@ Cubs	2–7	Silva (1–0)	Paulino (0–1)		37,291	1–9	6	–6
11	April 17	@ Cubs	4–3	Oswalt (1–2)	Gorzelanny (0–1)	Lindstrom (1)	40,471	2–9	6	–5
12	April 18	@ Cubs	3–2 (10)	Byrdak (1–0)	Marshall (0–1)	Lindstrom (2)	39,506	3–9	6	–5
13	April 20	Marlins	7–5	Lyon (1–1)	Wood (0–1)	Lindstrom (3)	24,135	4–9	6	–4½
14	April 21	Marlins	5–4	López (1–0)	Badenhop (0–2)	Lindstrom (4)	22,607	5–9	6	–4½
15	April 22	Marlins	1–5	Sánchez (1–1)	Paulino (0–2)		21,802	5–10	6	–5
16	April 24	Pirates	4–3	Oswalt (2–2)	Maholm (1–2)	Lindstrom (5)	30,018	6–10	6	–4
17	April 24	Pirates	5–2	Rodríguez (1–2)	Jakubauskas (0–1)	Lindstrom (6)	30,562	7–10	4	–3
18	April 25	Pirates	10–3	Myers (1–1)	Morton (0–4)		27,210	8–10	3	–3
19	April 27	Reds	2–6	Harang (1–3)	Norris (1–2)		22,467	8–11	5	–4½
20	April 28	Reds	4–6	Leake (2–0)	Paulino (0–3)		21,035	8–12	6	–5½
21	April 29	Reds	2–4	Arroyo (1–2)	Oswalt (2–3)	Cordero (8)	21,493	8–13	6	–6½
22	April 30	@ Braves	2–4	Hanson (2–2)	Myers (1–2)	Wagner (2)	30,082	8–14	6	–6½

May (9–20)

#	Date	Opponent	Score	Win	Loss	Save	Attendance	Record	Rank	GB
23	May 1	@ Braves	1–10	Hudson (2–1)	Rodríguez (1–3)		27,035	8–15	6	–7½
24	May 2	@ Braves	1–7	Lowe (4–2)	Norris (1–3)		25,665	8–16	6	–8½
25	May 3	Diamondbacks	1–9	Valdez (1–0)	Paulino (0–4)		20,370	8–17	6	–9½
26	May 4	Diamondbacks	0–1	Kennedy (2–1)	Oswalt (2–4)	Qualls (5)	22,661	8–18	6	–9½
27	May 5	Diamondbacks	4–2	Lindstrom (1–0)	Gutiérrez (0–4)		21,030	9–18	6	–8½
28	May 6	Diamondbacks	3–6	Haren (4–1)	Rodríguez (1–4)		21,019	9–19	6	–8½
29	May 7	Padres	0–7	Latos (2–3)	Norris (1–4)		25,586	9–20	6	–9½
30	May 8	Padres	1–2	Garland (4–2)	Paulino (0–5)	Bell (8)	27,038	9–21	6	–9½
31	May 9	Padres	4–3 (11)	Lyon (2–1)	Webb (0–1)	Capps (13)	23,526	10–21	6	–9½
32	May 11	@ Cardinals	6–3	Myers (2–2)	Penny (3–3)	Lindstrom (7)	35,875	11–21	6	–8½
33	May 12	@ Cardinals	9–6	Rodríguez (2–4)	Lohse (0–3)	Lindstrom (8)	36,342	12–21	6	–7½
34	May 13	@ Cardinals	4–1	Norris (2–4)	Carpenter (4–1)	Lindstrom (9)	39,026	13–21	6	–6½
35	May 14	@ Giants	2–8	Wellemeyer (2–3)	Paulino (0–6)		38,650	13–22	6	–7½
36	May 15	@ Giants	1–2	Lincecum (5–0)	Oswalt (2–5)	Wilson (8)	40,060	13–23	6	–7½
37	May 16	@ Giants	3–4	Zito (6–1)	Myers (2–3)	Wilson (9)	40,582	13–24	6	–8
38	May 17	@ Dodgers	2–6	Ely (2–1)	Rodríguez (2–5)		35,282	13–25	6	–9
39	May 18	@ Dodgers	3–7	Kuroda (5–1)	Norris (2–5)		55,662	13–26	6	–10
40	May 19	Rockies	7–3	Lyon (3–1)	Rogers (0–2)		25,200	14–26	6	–9
41	May 20	Rockies	0–4	Jiménez (8–1)	Oswalt (2–6)		25,932	14–27	6	–9½
42	May 21	Rays	2–1	Myers (3–3)	Garza (5–2)	Lindstrom (10)	27,601	15–27	6	–9½
43	May 22	Rays	2–4	Niemann (4–0)	Rodríguez (2–6)	Soriano (12)	33,778	15–28	6	–10
44	May 23	Rays	6–10	Price (7–1)	Moehler (0–1)	Soriano (13)	28,801	15–29	6	–10½
45	May 25	@ Brewers	1–6	Wolf (4–4)	Paulino (0–7)		27,363	15–30	6	–10½
46	May 26	@ Brewers	5–0	Oswalt (3–6)	Narveson (4–2)		30,151	16–30	6	–10½
47	May 27	@ Brewers	3–4 (10)	Axford (1–0)	Lindstrom (1–1)		34,355	16–31	6	–11½
48	May 28	@ Reds	6–15	LeCure (1–0)	Rodríguez (2–7)		30,813	16–32	6	–12½
49	May 29	@ Reds	2–12	Harang (4–5)	Moehler (0–2)		36,918	16–33	6	–13½
50	May 30	@ Reds	2–0 (10)	Lyon (4–1)	Owings (3–1)	Lindstrom (11)	36,038	17–33	6	–12½
51	May 31	Nationals	4–14	Atilano (5–1)	Oswalt (3–7)		34,704	17–34	6	–12½

June (14–14)

#	Date	Opponent	Score	Win	Loss	Save	Attendance	Record	Rank	GB
52	June 1	Nationals	8–7	López (2–0)	Capps (0–2)		25,249	18–34	6	–12½
53	June 2	Nationals	5–1	Rodríguez (3–7)	Lannan (2–3)		26,736	19–34	6	–11½
54	June 3	Nationals	6–4	Lindstrom (2–1)	Capps (0–3)		21,814	20–34	6	–11
55	June 4	Cubs	3–1	Paulino (1–7)	Zambrano (1–4)	Lindstrom (12)	28,784	21–34	6	–11
56	June 5	Cubs	5–8	Dempster (4–5)	Oswalt (3–8)	Mármol (12)	34,241	21–35	6	–12
57	June 6	Cubs	6–3	Myers (4–3)	Wells (3–4)	Lindstrom (13)	29,493	22–35	6	–11
58	June 7	@ Rockies	1–5	Hammel (3–3)	Rodríguez (3–8)	Corpas (7)	28,251	22–36	6	–11
59	June 8	@ Rockies	4–3	López (3–0)	Belisle (1–2)	Lindstrom (14)	26,201	23–36	6	–10
60	June 9	@ Rockies	6–2 (10)	Lyon (5–1)	Belisle (1–3)		27,114	24–36	5	–10
61	June 10	@ Rockies	5–4	Oswalt (4–8)	Chacín (3–5)	Lyon (1)	28,329	25–36	5	–10
62	June 11	@ Yankees	3–4	Pettite (8–1)	Myers (4–4)	Rivera (15)	46,883	25–37	5	–10
63	June 12	@ Yankees	3–9	Vasquez (6–5)	Rodríguez (3–9)		46,159	25–38	5	–11
64	June 13	@ Yankees	5–9	Hughes (9–1)	Moehler (0–3)		46,832	25–39	5	–11
65	June 15	@ Royals	7–15	Texeira (1–1)	Paulino (1–8)		24,862	25–40	5	–11
66	June 16	@ Royals	4–2	Oswalt (5–8)	Chen (3–1)	Lindstrom (15)	17,675	26–40	5	–10
67	June 17	@ Royals	2–5	Marte (2–0)	Myers (4–5)	Soria (16)	16,255	26–41	5	–11
68	June 18	Rangers	3–9	Feldman (5–6)	Rodríguez (3–10)		33,951	26–42	5	–11½
69	June 19	Rangers	1–5	Lewis (7–4)	Moehler (0–4)		41,060	26–43	5	–12½
70	June 20	Rangers	4–5 (10)	Ray (2–0)	Daigle (0–1)	Feliz (19)	33,753	26–44	5	–12½
71	June 22	Giants	1–3	Lincecum (8–2)	Oswalt (5–9)	Wilson (20)	29,777	26–45	5	–13½
72	June 23	Giants	6–3	Myers (5–5)	Zito (7–4)	Lindstrom (16)	29,311	27–45	5	–13½
73	June 24	Giants	7–5	Rodríguez (4–10)	Cain (6–6)	Lindstrom (17)	26,662	28–45	5	–12½
74	June 25	@ Rangers	7–4	Moehler (1–4)	Lewis (7–5)	Lindstrom (18)	43,457	29–45	5	–12
75	June 26	@ Rangers	2–7	Wilson (6–3)	Banks (0–1)		28,951	29–46	5	–13
76	June 27	@ Rangers	1–10	Hunter (4–0)	Oswalt (5–10)		37,487	29–47	5	–13
77	June 28	@ Brewers	9–5	Chacín (1–0)	Coffey (2–2)		27,908	30–47	5	–13
78	June 29	@ Brewers	5–7	Gallardo (8–3)	Myers (5–6)	Axford (8)	32,907	30–48	5	–13½
79	June 30	@ Brewers	5–1	Rodríguez (5–10)	Bush (3–6)		30,114	31–48	5	–13

July (13–11)

#	Date	Opponent	Score	Win	Loss	Save	Attendance	Record	Rank	GB
80	July 1	@ Padres	6–3 (10)	Sampson (1–0)	Gregerson (2–3)	Lindstrom (19)	18,618	32–48	5	–13
81	July 2	@ Padres	0–3	Latos (9–4)	Lyon (5–2)	Bell (22)	30,691	32–49	5	–14
82	July 3	@ Padres	0–1	Adams (2–1)	Chacín (1–1)	Bell (23)	40,042	32–50	5	–14
83	July 4	@ Padres	2–3	Bell (4–0)	Lyon (5–3)		23,498	32–51	5	–15
84	July 6	Pirates	6–2	Rodríguez (6–10)	Lincoln (1–3)		23,210	33–51	5	–14½
85	July 7	Pirates	6–3	Daigle (1–1)	McCutchen (1–4)	Lindstrom (20)	23,123	34–51	5	–14½
86	July 8	Pirates	2–0	Oswalt (6–10)	Ohlendorf (1–7)		24,416	35–51	5	–13½
87	July 9	Cardinals	0–8	Wainwright (13–5)	Norris (2–6)		33,224	35–52	5	–13½
88	July 10	Cardinals	4–1	Myers (6–6)	Suppan (0–5)	Lindstrom (21)	37,518	36–52	5	–12½
89	July 11	Cardinals	2–4	Hawksworth (3–5)	Rodríguez (6–11)	Franklin (16)	32,975	36–53	5	–12½
July 13: All-Star Game (NL wins—)			3–1	Capps (WSH)	Hughes (NYY)	Broxton (LAD)	45,408	Angel Stadium of Anaheim	Anaheim, California	
90	July 16	@ Pirates	5–2	Myers (7–6)	Duke (3–9)	Lindstrom (22)	23,373	37–53	5	–12½
91	July 17	@ Pirates	6–12	López (2–1)	Norris (2–7)		36,665	37–54	5	–13½
92	July 18	@ Pirates	0–9	Maholm (6–7)	Oswalt (6–11)		16,638	37–55	5	–14
93	July 19	@ Cubs	11–5	Rodríguez (7–11)	Silva (9–4)		35,514	38–55	5	–14
94	July 20	@ Cubs	7–14	Cashner (1–3)	Lyon (5–4)		36,401	38–56	5	–15
95	July 21	@ Cubs	4–3 (12)	Lyon (6–4)	Howry (1–3)	Chacín (1)	38,533	39–56	5	–15
96	July 23	Reds	4–6	Ondrusek (1–0)	Byrdak (1–1)	Cordero (27)	30,575	39–57	5	–14½
97	July 24	Reds	0–7	Cueto (10–2)	Oswalt (6–12)		31,552	39–58	5	–15
98	July 25	Reds	4–0	Rodríguez (8–11)	Leake (7–2)		25,705	40–58	5	–14½
99	July 26	Cubs	2–5	Silva (10–4)	Wright (0–1)	Mármol (19)	25,037	40–59	5	–15
100	July 27	Cubs	6–1	Myers (8–6)	Cashner (1–4)		28,047	41–59	5	–14
101	July 28	Cubs	8–1	Norris (3–7)	Wells (5–8)		28,046	42–59	5	–14
102	July 30	Brewers	5–0	Happ (2–0)	Parra (3–8)		27,456	43–59	5	–13½
103	July 31	Brewers	6–0	Rodríguez (9–11)	Bush (5–9)		38,824	44–59	5	–13½

August (17–12)

#	Date	Opponent	Score	Win	Loss	Save	Attendance	Record	Rank	GB
104	August 1	Brewers	5–2	Wright (1–1)	Loe (1–2)	Lyon (2)	27,964	45–59	5	–13½
105	August 2	@ Cardinals	9–4	Figueroa (3–1)	MacDougal (1–1)		43,369	46–59	4	–13
106	August 3	@ Cardinals	18–4	Norris (4–7)	García (9–5)		41,958	47–59	4	–12
107	August 4	@ Cardinals	4–8	Carpenter (12–3)	Happ (2–1)		41,596	47–60	4	–13
108	August 6	@ Brewers	5–6	Loe (2–2)	Lindstrom (2–2)		33,952	47–61	4	–14
109	August 7	@ Brewers	2–5	Wolf (8–9)	Myers (8–7)	Hoffman (6)	39,410	47–62	4	–15
110	August 8	@ Brewers	6–11	Gallardo (11–5)	Wright (1–2)		39,339	47–63	4	–16
111	August 9	Braves	10–4	Byrdak (2–1)	Farnsworth (3–1)		34,684	48–63	4	–15
112	August 10	Braves	2–4	Venters (4–0)	Lindstrom (2–3)	Wagner (28)	34,155	48–64	4	–15
113	August 11	Braves	2–8 (10)	Wagner (6–2)	Lyon (6–5)		31,352	48–65	4	–16
114	August 13	Pirates	4–1	López (4–0)	Meek (4–4)	Lyon (3)	36,124	49–65	4	–16
115	August 14	Pirates	3–2	Norris (5–7)	Maholm (7–11)	Lyon (4)	31,608	50–65	4	–15
116	August 15	Pirates	8–2	Happ (3–1)	Karstens (2–9)		34,372	51–65	4	–15
117	August 16	Mets	1–3	Feliciano (3–6)	Lindstrom (2–4)	Takahashi (1)	22,688	51–66	4	–15½
118	August 17	Mets	4–3	Melancon (1–0)	Santana (10–7)	López (1)	26,279	52–66	4	–15½
119	August 18	Mets	2–3 (14)	Dessens (3–1)	Chacin (1–2)	Acosta (1)	23,403	52–67	4	–16½
120	August 19	Mets	3–2	Norris (6–7)	Misch (0–2)	Lyon (5)	26,271	53–67	4	–16½
121	August 20	@ Marlins	0–9	Sánchez (10–8)	Happ (3–2)		19,456	53–68	4	–17½
122	August 21	@ Marlins	3–6	Volstad (7–9)	Rodríguez (9–12)		21,721	53–69	4	–17½
123	August 22	@ Marlins	2–1	López (5–0)	Veras (2–1)	Lyon (6)	18,886	54–69	4	–17½
124	August 23	@ Phillies	3–2	Myers (9–7)	Madson (4–2)	Lyon (7)	44,081	55–69	4	–16½
125	August 24	@ Phillies	4–2 (16)	Fulchino (1–0)	Herndon (1–3)		45,494	56–69	4	–15½
126	August 25	@ Phillies	3–2	Happ (4–2)	Halladay (16–9)	Lyon (8)	44,657	57–69	4	–15½
127	August 26	@ Phillies	5–1	Rodríguez (10–12)	Kendrick (8–7)		44,958	58–69	4	–15
128	August 27	@ Mets	1–2	Pelfrey (13–7)	Figueroa (3–2)	Takahashi (2)	30,178	58–70	4	–16
129	August 28	@ Mets	4–1	Myers (10–7)	Santana (10–9)	Lyon (9)	33,024	59–70	4	–15
130	August 29	@ Mets	1–5	Dickey (9–5)	Norris (6–8)		32,779	59–71	4	–16
131	August 30	Cardinals	3–0	Happ (5–2)	Westbrook (7–10)		23,140	60–71	4	–16
132	August 31	Cardinals	3–0	Rodríguez (11–12)	Carpenter (14–5)	Lyon (10)	29,307	61–71	4	–16

September/October (15–15)

#	Date	Opponent	Score	Win	Loss	Save	Attendance	Record	Rank	GB
133	September 1	Cardinals	5–2	Figueroa (4–2)	Suppan (1–7)	Lyon (11)	22,068	62–71	3	–16
134	September 3	@ Diamondbacks	3–4	Heilman (5–5)	López (5–1)	Gutiérrez (7)	24,748	62–72	3	–16
135	September 4	@ Diamondbacks	6–5	Melancon (2–0)	Heilman (5–6)	Lyon (12)	31,605	63–72	3	–16
136	September 5	@ Diamondbacks	3–2	Happ (6–2)	López (5–13)	Lyon (13)	25,416	64–72	3	–15
137	September 6	@ Cubs	4–5	Cashner (2–5)	López (5–2)	Mármol (28)	31,647	64–73	3	–15
138	September 7	@ Cubs	7–3	Figueroa (5–2)	Silva (10–6)		31,596	65–73	3	–14
139	September 8	@ Cubs	4–0	Myers (11–7)	Wells (6–13)		33,623	66–73	3	–13
140	September 9	Dodgers	3–2	Norris (7–8)	Lilly (8–10)	Lyon (14)	28,081	67–73	3	–12
141	September 10	Dodgers	2–4 (11)	Dotel (3–3)	Abad (0–1)		31,010	67–74	3	–13
142	September 11	Dodgers	3–6	Jansen (1–0)	Lyon (6–6)	Kuo (9)	39,237	67–75	3	–14
143	September 12	Dodgers	7–4	Chacín (2–2)	Troncoso (1–3)	Lyon (15)	30,240	68–75	3	–13
144	September 13	Brewers	4–2	Myers (12–7)	Kintzler (0–1)	Lindstrom (23)	31,342	69–75	3	–13
145	September 14	Brewers	3–2	Norris (8–8)	Capuano (3–4)	Lyon (16)	33,878	70–75	3	–12
146	September 15	Brewers	6–8 (10)	Axford (8–1)	Lindstrom (2–5)		30,791	70–76	3	–13
147	September 17	Reds	5–3	Fulchino (2–0)	Chapman (1–1)	Lyon (17)	30,218	71–76	3	–11½
148	September 18	Reds	1–11	Arroyo (16–10)	Figueroa (5–3)		29,855	71–77	3	–12½
149	September 19	Reds	4–3	Myers (13–7)	Wood (5–4)	Lyon (18)	32,520	72–77	3	–11½
150	September 20	@ Nationals	8–2	Norris (9–8)	Hernández (10–12)		10,999	73–77	3	–11½
151	September 21	@ Nationals	4–8	Clippard (10–6)	Paulino (1–9)		11,893	73–78	3	–12½
152	September 22	@ Nationals	3–4	Clippard (11–6)	Fulchino (2–1)	Burnett (3)	12,213	73–79	3	–12½
153	September 23	@ Nationals	2–7	Detwiler (1–2)	Figueroa (5–4)		14,633	73–80	3	–13
154	September 24	@ Pirates	10–7	Myers (14–7)	Leroux (0–1)	Lyon (19)	22,279	74–80	3	–12
155	September 25	@ Pirates	4–6	Duke (8–14)	Norris (9–9)	Hanrahan (6)	25,350	74–81	3	–12
156	September 26	@ Pirates	3–9	Maholm (9–15)	Happ (6–3)		23,208	74–82	3	–13
157	September 28	@ Reds	2–3	Chapman (2–2)	Byrdak (2–2)		30,151	74–83	3	–14
158	September 29	@ Reds	2–0	Figueroa (6–4)	Cueto (12–7)	Lyon (20)	14,760	75–83	3	–13
159	September 30	@ Reds	1–9	Arroyo (17–10)	Myers (14–8)		17,558	75-84	4	–14
160	October 1	Cubs	0–2	Coleman (4–2)	Norris (9–10)	Mármol (38)	33,869	75–85	4	–14
161	October 2	Cubs	3–8	Zambrano (11–6)	Happ (6–4)		36,098	75–86	4	–15
162	October 3	Cubs	4–0	Figueroa (7–4)	Dempster (15–12)		31,105	76–86	4	–15

=== Roster ===
2010 Houston Astros
Roster
Pitchers: 58 Fernando Abad; 60 Josh Banks; 48 Tim Byrdak; 73 Gustavo Chacín; 41 Casey Daigle; 66 Enerio del Rosario; 28 Nelson Figueroa; 47 Jeff Fulchino; 63 Samuel Gervacio; 30 J. A. Happ; 22 Matt Lindstrom; 59 Wilton López; 37 Brandon Lyon; 56 Gary Majewski; 54 Mark Melancon; 38 Brian Moehler; 39 Brett Myers; 20 Bud Norris; 44 Roy Oswalt; 52 Felipe Paulino; 51 Wandy Rodríguez; 43 Chris Sampson; 56 Henry Villar; 53 Wesley Wright	Catchers: 36 Kevin Cash; 15 Jason Castro; 41 Brian Esposito; 55 Humberto Quintero; 46 J. R. Towles; Infielders: 17 Lance Berkman; 27 Geoff Blum; 16 Matt Downs; 77 Pedro Feliz; 18 Anderson Hernández; 23 Chris Johnson; 8 Jeff Keppinger; 12 Tommy Manzella; 3 Kazuo Matsui; 26 Oswaldo Navarro; 36 Ángel Sánchez; 29 Brett Wallace; Outfielders: 19 Brian Bogusevic; 11 Jason Bourgeois; 21 Michael Bourn; 45 Carlos Lee; 4 Jason Michaels; 9 Hunter Pence; 18,26 Cory Sullivan	Manager: 2 Brad Mills; Coaches: 31 Brad Arnsberg (pitching); 5 Jeff Bagwell (hitting); 14 Sean Berry (hitting); 35 Dave Clark (third base); 10 Bobby Meacham (first base); 13 Al Pedrique (bench); 6 Jamie Quirk (bullpen)

== Player statistics ==
Table legend
*	Left-handed batter or pitcher	League leader	League leader (multiple teams)
#	Switch hitter	League top ten	League top ten (multiple teams)
	Leader in appearances at position	Team leader	

=== Batting ===
Abbreviations key

- Pos. – primary position
- G — Games played
- AB — At bats
- R — Runs
- H — Hits
- 2B — Doubles
- 3B — Triples
- HR — Home runs
- RBI — Runs batted in
- SB — Stolen bases
- BB — Walks
- AVG — Batting average
- OBP — On-base percentage
- SLG — Slugging percentage
- OPS — On-base plus slugging

Individual batting results
Pos.	Player	G	AB	R	H	HR	RBI	SB	BA	OBP	SLG	OPS
C	Humberto Quintero	88	265	13	62	4	20	0	.234	.262	.317	.579
1B	Lance Berkman^{#}	85	298	39	73	13	49	3	.245	.372	.436	.808
2B	Jeff Keppinger	137	514	62	148	6	59	4	.288	.351	.393	.744
3B	Chris Johnson	94	341	40	105	11	52	3	.308	.337	.481	.818
SS	Tommy Manzella	83	258	17	58	1	21	0	.225	.267	.264	.531
LF	Carlos Lee	157	605	67	149	24	89	3	.246	.291	.417	.708
CF	Michael Bourn*	141	535	84	142	2	38	52	.265	.341	.346	.686
RF	Hunter Pence	156	614	93	173	25	91	18	.282	.325	.461	.786
3B	Pedro Feliz	97	289	22	64	4	31	1	.221	.243	.311	.555
SS	Ángel Sánchez	65	250	30	70	0	25	0	.280	.316	.348	.664
IF	Geoff Blum^{#}	93	202	22	54	2	22	0	.267	.321	.356	.678
C	Jason Castro*	67	195	26	40	2	8	0	.205	.286	.287	.573
LF	Jason Michaels	106	186	23	47	8	26	0	.253	.310	.468	.778
1B	Brett Wallace*	51	144	14	32	2	13	0	.222	.296	.319	.615
CF	Jason Bourgeois	69	123	16	27	0	3	12	.220	.294	.268	.562
2B	Kazuo Matsui^{#}	27	71	4	10	0	1	1	.141	.197	.155	.352
OF	Cory Sullivan*	57	64	6	12	0	4	0	.188	.257	.234	.492
C	Kevin Cash	20	54	3	11	2	4	0	.204	.271	.333	.605
IF	Anderson Hernández^{#}	32	48	7	9	0	1	2	.188	.304	.229	.533
C	J. R. Towles	17	47	3	9	1	8	0	.191	.235	.319	.554
OF	Brian Bogusevic*	19	28	5	5	0	3	1	.179	.258	.286	.544
SS	Oswaldo Navarro	14	20	2	1	0	0	0	.050	.240	.050	.290
IF	Matt Downs	11	19	2	2	0	0	0	.105	.190	.105	.296
C	Brian Esposito	2	3	0	0	0	0	0	.000	.000	.000	.000
P	Gustavo Chacín*	40	1	1	1	1	1	0	1.000	1.000	4.000	5.000

=== Pitching ===
Abbreviations key

- W — wins
- L — losses
- ERA — earned run average
- G — games pitched
- GS — games started
- SV — saves
- IP — innings pitched
- H — hits allowed
- ER — earned runs allowed
- BB — base on balls allowed
- SO — strikeouts
- WHIP — walks plus hits per inning pitched

==== Starting pitchers ====
Individual pitching results
⌖	Player	W	L	ERA	G	GS	GF	IP	SO	BB	WHIP
SP	Brett Myers	14	8	3.14	33	33	0	223.2	180	66	1.243
SP	Wandy Rodríguez*	11	12	3.60	32	32	0	195.0	178	68	1.287
SP	Bud Norris	9	10	4.92	27	27	0	153.2	158	77	1.484
SP	Roy Oswalt	6	12	3.42	20	20	0	129.0	120	34	1.109
SP	Felipe Paulino	1	9	5.11	19	14	0	91.2	83	46	1.538
SP	J. A. Happ*	5	4	3.75	13	13	0	72.0	61	35	1.319
SW	Nelson Figueroa	5	3	3.22	18	10	1	67.0	58	25	1.328
SW	Brian Moehler	1	4	4.92	20	8	5	56.2	28	26	1.624
SW	Wesley Wright	1	2	5.73	14	4	3	33.0	29	13	1.515
SP	Josh Banks	0	1	13.50	1	1	0	4.0	1	4	3.000
Other: Complete games—Myers (2), Happ (1), Oswalt (1) • Shutouts—Happ (1), Oswalt (1) • Sources:

==== Relief pitchers ====
Player	W	L	ERA	G	GF	SV	IP	K	BB	ERA+
Brandon Lyon	6	6	3.12	79	28	20	78.0	54	31	127
Wilton López	5	2	2.96	68	14	1	67.0	50	5	134
Tim Byrdak*	2	2	3.49	64	9	0	38.2	29	20	114
Matt Lindstrom	2	5	4.39	58	41	23	53.1	43	20	91
Jeff Fulchino	2	1	5.51	50	16	0	47.1	46	22	72
Gustavo Chacín*	2	2	4.70	44	12	1	38.1	31	20	85
Chris Sampson	1	0	5.93	35	9	0	30.1	16	8	67
Fernando Abad	0	1	2.84	22	6	0	19.0	12	5	142
Mark Melancon	2	0	3.12	20	2	0	17.1	19	8	129
Casey Daigle	1	1	11.32	13	4	0	10.1	6	6	36
Henry Villar	0	0	4.50	8	3	0	6.0	3	3	93
Samuel Gervacio	0	1	12.27	6	1	0	3.2	3	5	36
Gary Majewski	0	0	22.50	2	2	0	2.0	1	1	21
Enerio del Rosario	0	0	20.25	2	1	0	1.1	1	0	25
Kevin Cash	0	0	9.00	1	1	0	1.0	0	0	61

== Major League Baseball draft ==
Houston Astros 2010 MLB draft selections
Rd.	Slot	Draftee	Position	School	Origin	Signed	Notes	Bio
1	8	Delino DeShields Jr.	Center fielder	Woodward Academy	(Maryland)	Y	(Note: MLB debut on April 8, 2015, for the Texas Rangers)	
1	19	Mike Foltynewicz	Right-handed pitcher	Minooka High	(Illinois)	Y	(Note: Compensatory pick from the Detroit Tigers for signing José Valverde in free agency.) (Note: MLB debut on August 2, 2014, for Houston)	
1	33	Mike Kvasnicka	Catcher	Minnesota	(Minnesota)	Y	(Note: Supplemental pick for Detroit Tigers signing José Valverde.)	
2	58	Vince Velasquez	Right-handed pitcher	Garey High	(California)	Y	(Note: MLB debut on July 10, 2015, for Houston)	
3	90	Austin Wates	Right fielder	Virginia Tech	(Washington (state))	Y		
4	123	Bobby Doran	Right-handed pitcher	Texas Tech	(Oklahoma)	Y		
5	153	Ben Heath	Catcher	Penn State	(Virginia)	Y		
6	183	Adam Plutko	Right-handed pitcher	Glendora High	(California)	N	(Note: Signed with the Cleveland Indians from the 2013 draft.) (Note: MLB debut on September 24, 2016, for Cleveland)	
7	213	Roberto Peña	Catcher	Eloisa Pascual High	(Puerto Rico)	Y		
8	243	Jake Buchanan	Right-handed pitcher	North Carolina State	(North Carolina)	Y	(Note: MLB debut on June, 21, 2014, for Houston)	
9	273	Tommy Shirley	Left-handed pitcher	Xavier	(Pennsylvania)	Y		
10	303	Evan Grills	Left-handed pitcher	Sinclair Secondary	(Ontario)	Y		
19	573	JaCoby Jones	Shortstop	Richton High (MS)	(Oklahoma)	N	(Note: Signed with the Pittsburgh Pirates from the 2013 draft.) (Note: MLB debut on August 30, 2016, for the Detroit Tigers)	
21	633	Aaron Blair	Right-handed pitcher	Spring Valley High	(Nevada)	N	(Note: Signed with the Arizona Diamondbacks from the 2013 draft.) (Note: MLB debut on April 24, 2016, for the Atlanta Braves)	

== Awards and achievements ==
=== Grand slams ===
No.	Date	Astros batter	Venue	Inning	Pitcher	Opposing team	Box
1	June 9	Carlos Lee	Coors Field	10 (Note: Tied score or took lead)	Matt Belisle	Colorado Rockies	
2	July 27	Lance Berkman	Minute Maid Park	7	Andrew Cashner	Chicago Cubs	
3	August 1	Jason Michaels (Note: Pinch hitter)	Minute Maid Park	7	Zach Braddock	Milwaukee Brewers	

=== Career honors ===
- King of Baseball Award: Milo Hamilton, broadcaster

=== Annual awards ===
2010 Houston Astros award winners
Name of award		Recipient	Ref.
Darryl Kile Good Guy Award		Geoff Blum	
Fielding Bible	Center field	Michael Bourn	
Frank Slocum Big B. A. T. Award		Brad Lidge (Note: Former Houston Astros player on the roster of the Philadelphia Phillies this season.)	
Fred Hartman Award for Long and Meritorious Service to Baseball		Barry Waters	
Gold Glove Award	Outfielder	Michael Bourn	
Houston-Area Major League Player of the Year	TBR	Carl Crawford	
Houston Astros	Most Valuable Player (MVP)	Hunter Pence	
Houston Astros	Pitcher of the Year	Brett Myers	
Houston Astros	Rookie of the Year	Chris Johnson	
MLB All-Star Game	Reserve outfielder	Michael Bourn	
National League (NL) Player of the Week	September 5	Hunter Pence	

Other awards results

Name of award	Voting recipient(s) (Team)	Ref.
NL Cy Young	1st—Halladay (PHI) • 6th—Owalt (HOU/PHI) • 10th—Myers (HOU)	
Roberto Clemente	Winner—Wakefield (BOS) • Nominee—Blum (HOU)	

=== League leaders ===
NL batting leaders

- At bats per strikeout (AB/SO): Jeff Keppinger (14.3)
- Stolen bases: Michael Bourn (52)

== Minor league system ==
Level	Team	League	Manager
AAA	Round Rock Express	Pacific Coast League	Marc Bombard
AA	Corpus Christi Hooks	Texas League	Wes Clements
A	Lancaster JetHawks	California League	Tom Lawless
A	Lexington Legends	South Atlantic League	Rodney Linares
A-Short Season	Tri-City ValleyCats	New York–Penn League	Jim Pankovits
Rookie	Greeneville Astros	Appalachian League	Ed Romero
Rookie	GCL Astros	Gulf Coast League	Omar López

League champions

- New York—Penn League champions: Tri-City

Award winners

- All-Star Futures Game—Pitcher: Jordan Lyles
- Appalachian League Executive of the Year: David Lane
- Houston Astros Minor League Player of the Year:
  - Jordan Lyles
  - J. D. Martinez
- Minor League Short-Season All-Star Team—Outfielder: J. D. Martinez
- South Atlantic League All-Star Team
  - Second baseman: Jose Altuve
  - Outfielder: J. D. Martinez
- South Atlantic League Most Valuable Player (MVP): J. D. Martinez

== See also ==
- List of Major League Baseball annual stolen base leaders
- List of Major League Baseball players with a home run in their final major league at bat
