= Jason Bourgeois =

American baseball player and coach (born 1982)

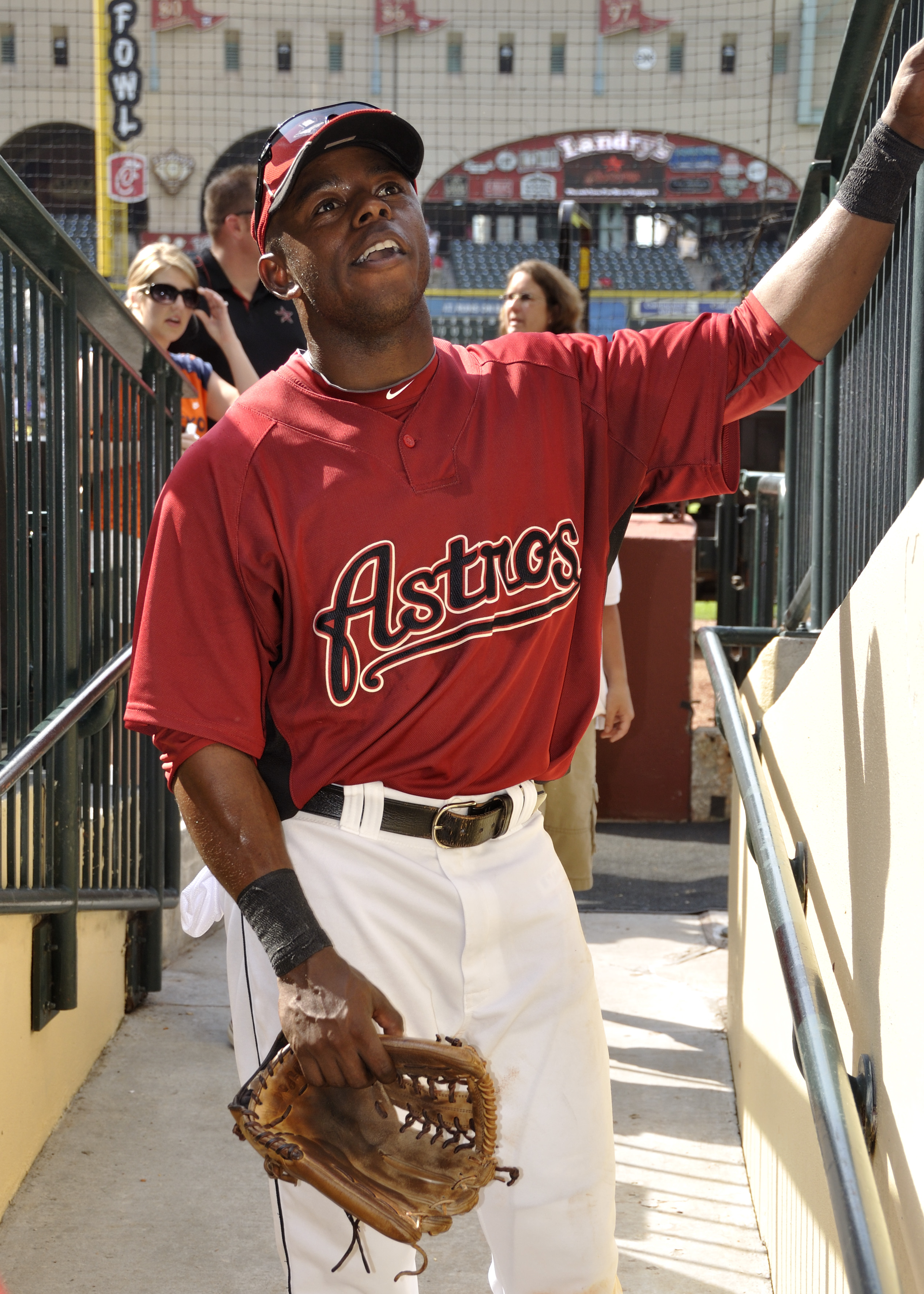
- Bourgeois with the Houston Astros in 2010

Baltimore Orioles – No. 36
- Outfielder / Coach
- Born: January 4, 1982 (age 44); Houston, Texas, U.S.
- Batted: Right Threw: Right

MLB debut
- September 9, 2008, for the Chicago White Sox

Last MLB appearance
- October 4, 2015, for the Cincinnati Reds

MLB statistics
- Batting average: .253
- Home runs: 6
- Runs batted in: 44
- Stolen bases: 54
- Stats at Baseball Reference

Teams
- As player: Chicago White Sox (2008); Milwaukee Brewers (2009); Houston Astros (2010–2011); Kansas City Royals (2012); Tampa Bay Rays (2013); Cincinnati Reds (2014–2015); As coach: Chicago White Sox (2024–2025); Baltimore Orioles (2026–present)

Jason Jerrod Bourgeois (booj-wa; born January 4, 1982) is an American former professional baseball outfielder who currently serves as the first base coach for the Baltimore Orioles of Major League Baseball (MLB). He played eight seasons in MLB, primarily for the Houston Astros and the Cincinnati Reds.

== Amateur career ==
Born and raised in Houston, Texas, Bourgeois was teammates with fellow MLB outfielders Carl Crawford and Michael Bourn on a little league team that won the state championship. Bourgeois would later go on to attend Forest Brook High School. During his senior year at Forest Brook, Bourgeois hit .553 with four home runs, 43 RBI, and 24 stolen bases.

== Professional career ==
=== Texas Rangers ===
Bourgeois was drafted as a shortstop in the second round (56th overall) of the 2000 Major League Baseball draft by the Texas Rangers. He played in the Rangers minor league system until 2004, reaching as high as Double-A.

=== Atlanta Braves ===
On March 23, 2005, the Atlanta Braves claimed Bourgeois off waivers from the Rangers. He spent the entire season with the Triple-A Richmond Braves, batting .240 with two home runs and 16 RBI in 119 games.

=== Seattle Mariners ===
The Seattle Mariners selected Bourgeois in the Rule 5 Draft on December 8, 2005. In 107 games with the Double-A San Antonio Missions, he batted .277 with four home runs and 38 RBI while stealing 23 bases in 30 attempts. He would become a minor league free agent after the season.

=== Chicago White Sox ===
On December 19, 2006, Bourgeois signed a contract with the Chicago White Sox. He was recalled by the White Sox on September 6, 2008, and made his major league debut on September 9 against the Toronto Blue Jays as a pinch runner. Bourgeois is the last player to get his first major league hit at the original Yankee Stadium.

=== Milwaukee Brewers ===
On November 24, 2008, the Milwaukee Brewers signed Bourgeois to a minor league deal with an invitation to spring training. He was assigned to play for with the Triple-A Nashville Sounds of the Pacific Coast League. He would hit .189/.250/.270 in 24 games for Milwaukee in 2009, but did hit his first big league home run off of the Pittsburgh Pirates' Zach Duke on August 28.

On August 12, 2009, he was called to play for the Brewers to replace Bill Hall, who was designated for assignment. This would be the first of two times that Bourgeois would replace Bill Hall on a Major League roster. The second came on June 4, 2011, when the Houston Astros released Hall after activating Bourgeois from the disabled list.

=== Houston Astros ===
Bourgeois was claimed off waivers by the Houston Astros on October 26, 2009.

On January 20, 2010, Bourgeois, who was designated for assignment by the Astros, accepted his assignment to Triple A Round Rock after clearing waivers.

On June 20, 2010, Bourgeois, Jason Castro and Chris Johnson were added to the major league roster and Casey Daigle, Cory Sullivan and Kevin Cash were designated for assignment. Bourgeois played in 69 games for the Astros that year, batting .220 with 3 RBI. He also made twelve starts in September and October after starting center fielder Michael Bourn was injured.

On April 30, 2011, Bourgeois earned his first career walk-off win with a single to left field in the bottom of the ninth inning scoring Bill Hall (who pinch ran for Brett Wallace after he reached base on a walk earlier that inning) from second base to lead the Astros to a 2–1 victory over the Milwaukee Brewers. Bourgeois had the other run in that game. Overall, it was a breakout game for Bourgeois, as he had a game-high three hits (two singles and a double). He also had two stolen bases (second and third consecutively) in the first inning, and would later come home and score a run that inning on a Hunter Pence RBI single. Later that year on July 31, he would hit his second major league home run off of Chris Narveson and his former team, the Brewers. Bourgeois was recognized by the Houston chapter of the Baseball Writers' Association of America (BBWAA) in 2011 as the recipient of the Darryl Kile Good Guy Award.

=== Kansas City Royals ===
On March 20, 2012, Bourgeois was traded to the Kansas City Royals along with Humberto Quintero for minor leaguer Kevin Chapman and a player to be named later. He appeared in 30 games for the Royals during the 2012 season, batting .258 with 5 RBI and five stolen bases. Most of his season was spent with the Triple A affiliate Omaha Storm Chasers, where he had a .243 batting average with three home runs, 8 RBI and seven stolen bases in 60 games. On November 2, 2012, the Royals designated Bourgeois for assignment. After clearing waivers, he elected to become a free agent on November 12.

=== Tampa Bay Rays ===
On December 5, 2012, the Tampa Bay Rays signed Bourgeois to a minor league contract, with no guaranteed invite to Spring Training. Bourgeois played most of his season with the Triple-A Durham Bulls, batting .290 with two home runs and 61 RBI in 90 games. On August 14, playing only his sixth game for the Rays after being called up, Bourgeois hit a walk-off RBI single to help the Rays defeat the Seattle Mariners. He was designated for assignment on August 23, 2013.

=== Cincinnati Reds ===
On November 5, 2013, Bourgeois signed with the Cincinnati Reds with an invite to Spring Training. On September 1, 2014, the Reds selected Bourgeois' contract from the Triple-A Louisville Bats, and he hit .242/.265/.303 in 18 games. Bourgeois would take on a larger role for Cincinnati during the 2015 season, hitting .240/.294/.332 with three home runs and 14 RBI in 68 games.

=== Arizona Diamondbacks ===
On December 23, 2015, Bourgeois signed a minor league deal with the Arizona Diamondbacks. He began the season with the Triple-A Reno Aces, batting .356 with 9 RBI in 33 games.

=== Chicago White Sox (second stint) ===
Bourgeois was traded to the Chicago White Sox for cash considerations on May 16, 2016. He was assigned to the Triple-A Charlotte Knights, where he hit .273 with three home runs and 38 RBI in 89 games to finish the season. Bourgeois elected free agency following the season on November 7.

On January 17, 2017, Bourgeois was re-signed by the White Sox to a minor league deal. He returned to Charlotte for the year, playing in 68 contests and hitting .266/.303/.351 with 4 home runs and 24 RBI. He elected free agency following the season on November 6.

=== Tigres de Quintana Roo ===
On December 4, 2017, Bourgeois signed with the Tigres de Quintana Roo of the Mexican Baseball League. He was released on July 15, 2018.

== Coaching career ==
=== Los Angeles Dodgers ===
On January 16, 2019, Bourgeois was announced as an assistant coach for the Great Lakes Loons in the Los Angeles Dodgers farm system.

=== Chicago White Sox ===
On November 7, 2023, Bourgeois was named as the first base/outfield coach for the Chicago White Sox. He was let go by the White Sox following the 2025 season.

=== Baltimore Orioles ===
On November 10, 2025, the Baltimore Orioles hired Bourgeois to serve as the team's first base coach, replacing Anthony Sanders.

== Personal life ==
Bourgeois is married to American singer and Sony ATV songwriter Coline Creuzot. The couple had their first child in 2015.
