= Cory Sullivan =

American baseball player (born 1979)

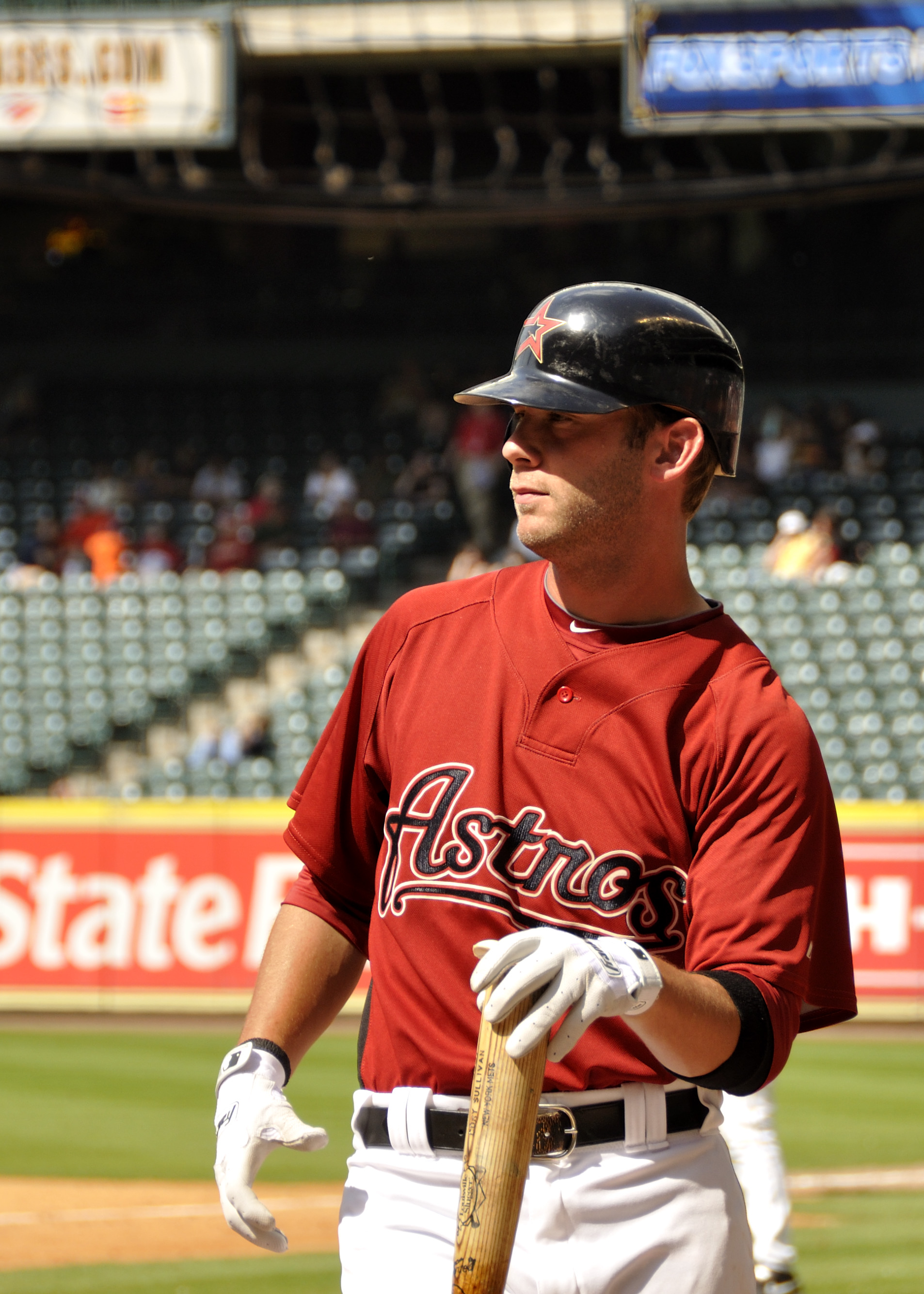
- Sullivan with the Houston Astros in 2010
- Outfielder
- Born: August 20, 1979 (age 46); Tulsa, Oklahoma, U.S.
- Batted: Left Threw: Left

MLB debut
- April 4, 2005, for the Colorado Rockies

Last MLB appearance
- June 20, 2010, for the Houston Astros

MLB statistics
- Batting average: .271
- Home runs: 10
- Runs batted in: 97
- Stats at Baseball Reference

Teams
- Colorado Rockies (2005–2008); New York Mets (2009); Houston Astros (2010)

Cory Sullivan (born August 20, 1979) is an American former professional baseball outfielder. He played in Major League Baseball (MLB) for the Colorado Rockies, New York Mets, and Houston Astros between 2005 and 2010.

== Early life ==
Sullivan was born in Tulsa, Oklahoma and graduated from North Allegheny Senior High School in Wexford, Pennsylvania. He is an alumnus of the Wake Forest University. In 2000, he played collegiate summer baseball in the Cape Cod Baseball League for the Yarmouth-Dennis Red Sox and was named a league all-star.

== Career ==
=== Colorado Rockies ===
==== 2005 ====
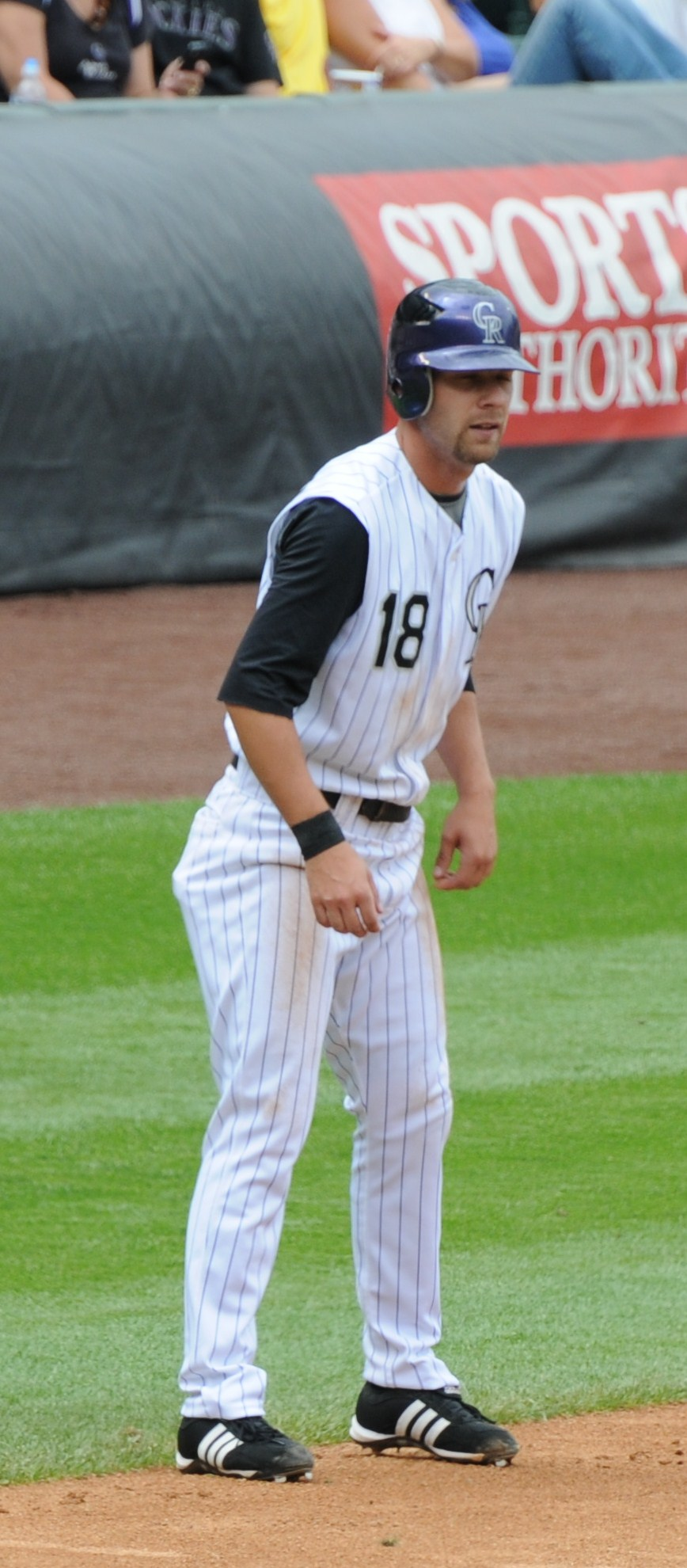
Sullivan with the Colorado Rockies in 2008.

Sullivan was drafted by the Colorado Rockies in the 7th round of the 2001 Major League Baseball draft. He made his major league debut on April 4, 2005. He began the year as the Rockies' fourth outfielder, but assumed the role of starting center fielder prior to mid-season when the Rockies traded then-starter Preston Wilson to the Washington Nationals. By season's end, he would finish with a .294 batting average with 4 home runs, 30 runs batted in, and 12 stolen bases in 139 games. With his performance, he earned the center field position and lead off spot in the Rockies' batting order for 2006.

==== 2006 ====
Sullivan began his 2006 campaign red hot. On April 9, 2006, Sullivan etched his name in major league record books. He became only the 11th player in history to triple twice in the same inning. He accomplished this feat against the San Diego Padres. The first triple came against Padres ace Jake Peavy, the second off Chan Ho Park. The last time this feat took place was on August 21, 1951, by Gil Coan of the Washington Senators. The last National League player to accomplish this was on July 22, 1926, by Curt Walker of the Cincinnati Reds.

==== 2007 ====
In the 2007 spring training, Sullivan lost out on the starting center fielder position to Willy Taveras and began the season in Triple-A Colorado Springs.

=== New York Mets ===
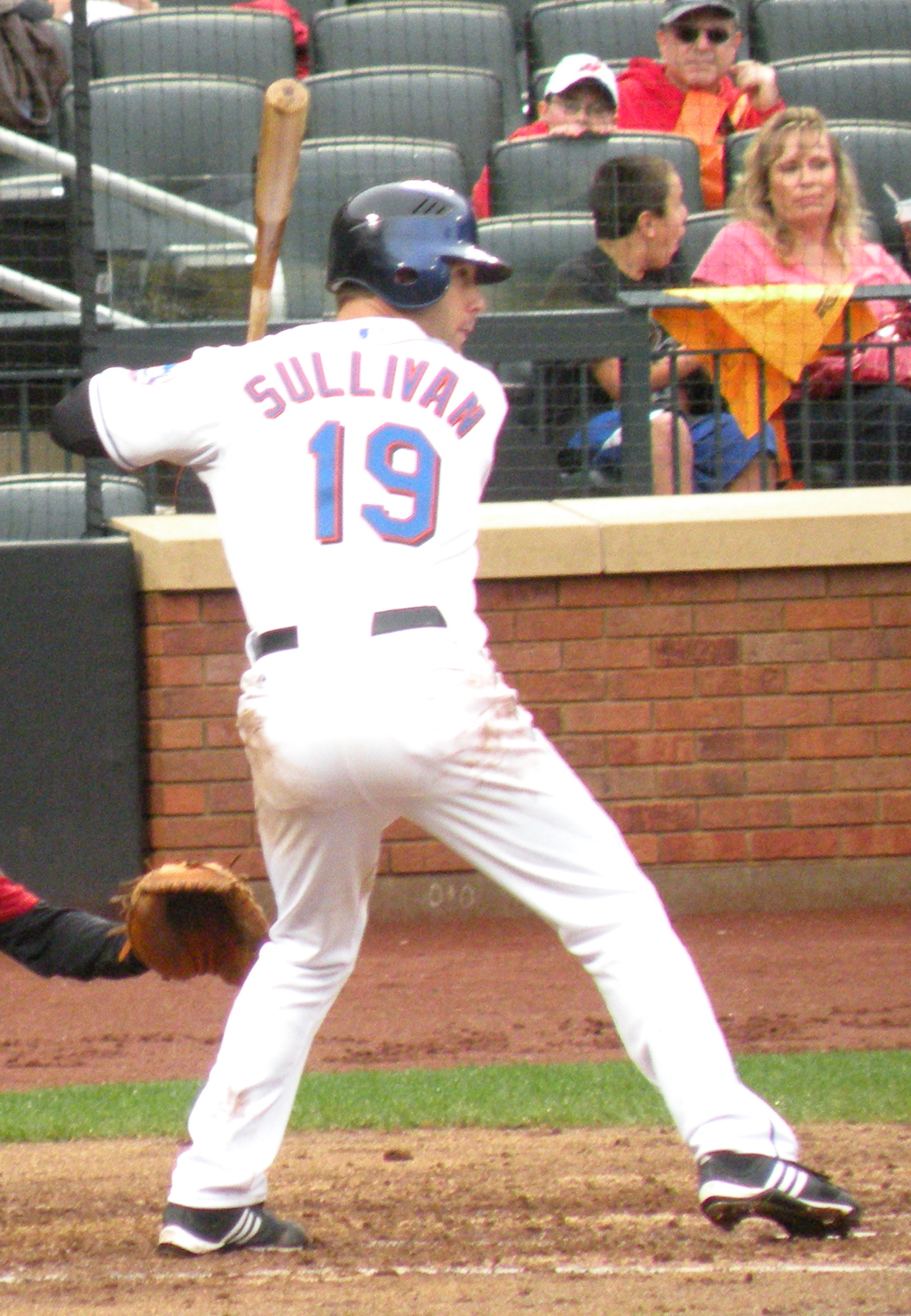
Sullivan with New York Mets in 2009.

In January 2009, Sullivan agreed to a one-year contract with the New York Mets. He was optioned to Triple-A Buffalo before the start of the season.

On July 20 2009, Sullivan was called up from Triple-A Buffalo after pitcher Fernando Nieve was put on the disabled list. Sullivan wore No. 19, formerly the number of Ryan Church.

=== Houston Astros ===
On January 20, 2010, Sullivan signed a minor league deal with the Houston Astros and was invited to spring training. He was added to the Major League roster on April 3 after winning the 5th outfielder spot over Jason Bourgeois. He was designated for assignment with Casey Daigle and Kevin Cash for rookies Chris Johnson, Jason Castro, and Jason Bourgeois. He was the only one to refuse minor league assignment, so he became a free agent.

=== Philadelphia Phillies ===
On February 11, 2011, Sullivan signed a minor league deal with the Philadelphia Phillies. He was released on May 28.

=== Los Angeles Dodgers ===
The Los Angeles Dodgers signed Sullivan to a minor league contract on December 13, 2011. He also received an invitation to spring training. The Dodgers released Sullivan prior to the start of the season on March 29, 2012.

== Personal life ==
He married Bresee Sullivan in November 2006. His wife gave birth to daughter Riley Dylan at 2:10 a.m. on July 5, 2007 at Rose Medical Center in Denver, Colorado.

Sullivan shares a birthday with former Colorado Rockies' teammate Todd Helton.
