= Humberto Quintero =

Venezuelan baseball player and coach (born 1979)

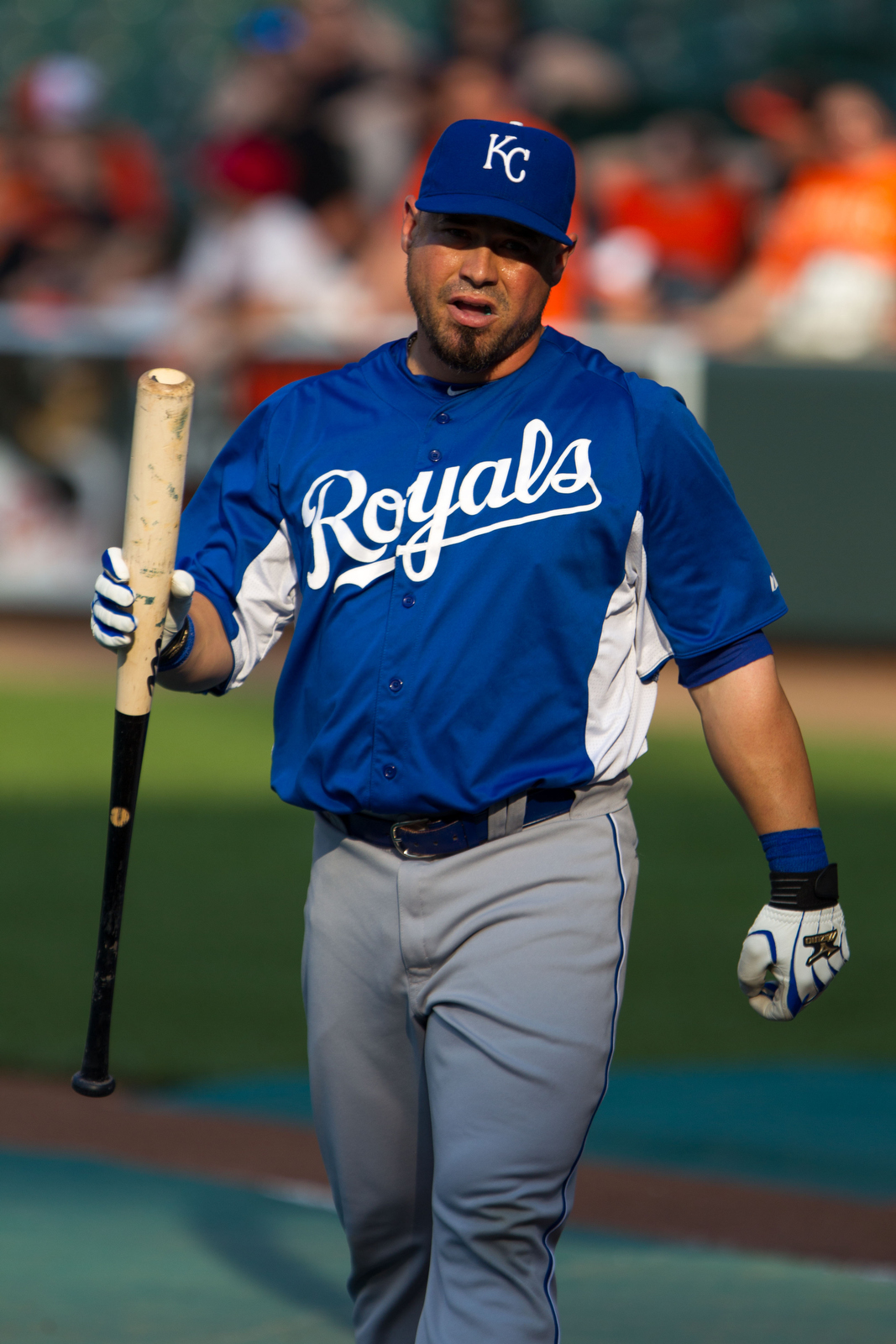
- Quintero with the Kansas City Royals in 2012
- Catcher / Bullpen catcher
- Born: August 2, 1979 (age 47); Maracaibo, Venezuela
- Batted: Right Threw: Right

MLB debut
- September 3, 2003, for the San Diego Padres

Last MLB appearance
- September 1, 2014, for the Seattle Mariners

MLB statistics
- Batting average: .234
- Home runs: 20
- Runs batted in: 127
- Stats at Baseball Reference

Teams
- As player: San Diego Padres (2003–2004); Houston Astros (2005–2011); Kansas City Royals (2012); Philadelphia Phillies (2013); Seattle Mariners (2013–2014); As coach: Arizona Diamondbacks (2016–2021)

Humberto Jose Quintero (born August 2, 1979) is a Venezuelan former professional baseball player and coach. He played in Major League Baseball (MLB) as a catcher from 2003 to 2014 most prominently as a member of the Houston Astros. He also played for the San Diego Padres, Kansas City Royals, Philadelphia Phillies, and Seattle Mariners. He served as a bullpen catcher for the Arizona Diamondbacks from 2016 to 2021.

== Playing career ==
=== Chicago White Sox ===
On January 16, 1997, Quintero signed as an international free agent with the Chicago White Sox. After playing two years in Venezuela, he played 1999 with Advanced Rookie Bristol, where in 48 games, he hit .277 with 15 RBI and 11 SB. He spent most of 2000 with Single-A Burlington but also played in 15 games for the Arizona League White Sox. In 90 games total, he hit .266 with 32 RBI and 11 SB. He split 2001 with Single-A Kannapolis and the A-Advanced Winston-Salem Warthogs, but also played in 5 games for Double-A Birmingham. In 108 games, he hit .254 with 1 HR, 34 RBI and 16 SB. After the year, he was rated the 25th best prospect in the White Sox organization by Baseball America.

=== San Diego Padres ===
On July 12, 2002, Quintero was traded with Alex Fernandez to the San Diego Padres for D'Angelo Jiménez. Before the trade, he played mostly with Winston-Salem, but also played in 4 games with Birmingham, and 15 games with Triple-A Charlotte. After the trade, he played with Double-A Mobile. In 108 games, he hit .225 with 1 home run and 34 RBI. Quintero played 2003 with Mobile, where he hit .298 with 3 HR and 52 RBI before being called up in September.

Quintero appeared in 12 games for the Padres in 2003, where he went 5-for-23 with 2 RBI. His first career hit came as a pinch-hitter in his debut, a single off of Dennys Reyes of the Arizona Diamondbacks. Quintero spent most of the 2004 with Triple-A Portland, but spent three stints with the Padres, including being the starting catcher for most of July. He hit his first career home run off of Scott Service. In 23 games with the Padres, he hit .250 with two home runs and 10 RBI.

=== Houston Astros ===
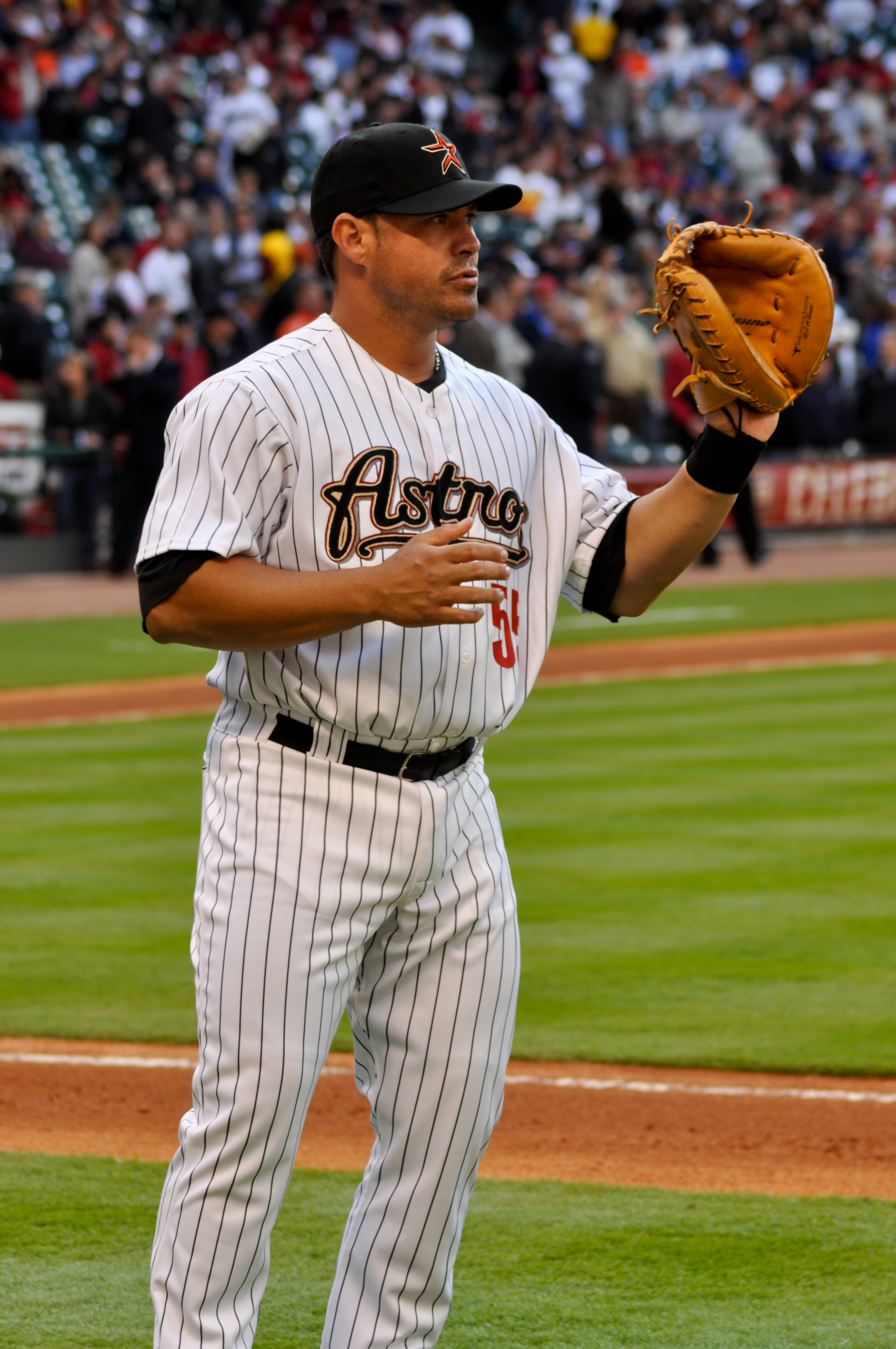
Quintero with the Houston Astros in 2009

On March 28, 2005, Quintero was traded to the Houston Astros for pitcher Tim Redding. Quintero began the year with the Triple-A Round Rock Express. On June 1, Quintero was recalled when Raúl Chávez was designated for assignment. Quintero started five games before being placed on the disabled list. After a rehab assignment with Double-A Corpus Christi, he was activated from the disabled list on July 16. On August 31, he was optioned to Round Rock but was recalled when the rosters expanded. In 18 games with the Astros, he hit .185 with 1 HR and 8 RBI.

Quintero spent most of 2006 with Round Rock, but on August 28, he was recalled, replacing J. R. House. In 11 games with the Astros, he went 7-21 with 2 RBI. Quintero made the Opening Day roster with the Astros in 2007, but was outrighted to Round Rock on June 10. He returned to the Astros as a September call-up. In 29 games with the Astros, he hit .226 with 1 RBI.

Quintero made the Opening Day roster in 2008 with the Astros, but did not appear in a game before being outrighted to Round Rock. On April 14, he was called up to the Astros, but was outrighted again on April 23. On June 5, he was called up again, replacing J. R. Towles. On July 2, he was placed on the disabled list with a concussion, and was activated on June 22 after a rehab assignment in Corpus Christi. He was the starting catcher for most of August and September, replacing Brad Ausmus.

Quintero was considered the incumbent starting catcher for the 2009 season due to his experience over J.R. Towles and Lou Palmisano but became the backup catcher after the team signed with Iván Rodríguez on March 16, 2009. Quintero was placed on the disabled list on April 25. After a rehab assignment with Round Rock, he was activated from the disabled list on May 12. Quintero spent the rest of the season with the Astros. In 60 games with the Astros, he hit .236 with 4 HR and 14 RBI.

In the 2010 season, Quintero was moved into the starting role behind the plate and was backed up by Kevin Cash. He began splitting time with Jason Castro during the season. In 88 games, he hit .234 with 4 HR and 20 RBI.

On May 28, 2011, Quintero was placed on the 15-day disabled list with a high right ankle sprain. Robinson Cancel was called up to take his spot followed by Carlos Corporan just a few days later. In 79 games with the Astros, he hit .240 with two home runs and 25 RBI.

=== Kansas City Royals ===
On March 20, 2012, Quintero was traded to the Kansas City Royals along with Jason Bourgeois for minor leaguer Kevin Chapman and a player to be named later. On June 27, Quintero was designated for assignment. He was released by Kansas City on July 5, after batting .232 with 1 HR and 19 RBI for the team in 43 games.

=== Miami Marlins ===
Quintero signed a minor league contract with the Miami Marlins on July 14, 2012, and was assigned to the Triple-A New Orleans Zephyrs. He was released on July 20.

=== Milwaukee Brewers ===
On July 28, 2012, Quintero signed a minor league contract with the Milwaukee Brewers. He was assigned to Triple-A Nashville.

=== Philadelphia Phillies ===
In the wake of Carlos Ruiz's 25-game suspension, the Philadelphia Phillies signed Quintero to a minor league deal with an invite to Spring Training in 2013. He was designated for assignment on April 28. He was called up to the Phillies when Ruiz was placed on the disabled list, and became the starting catcher for nine days when Erik Kratz also went on the disabled list. However, with both catchers having returned from their injuries, Quintero was designated for assignment on June 24. After clearing waivers, Quintero elected free agency.

=== Seattle Mariners ===
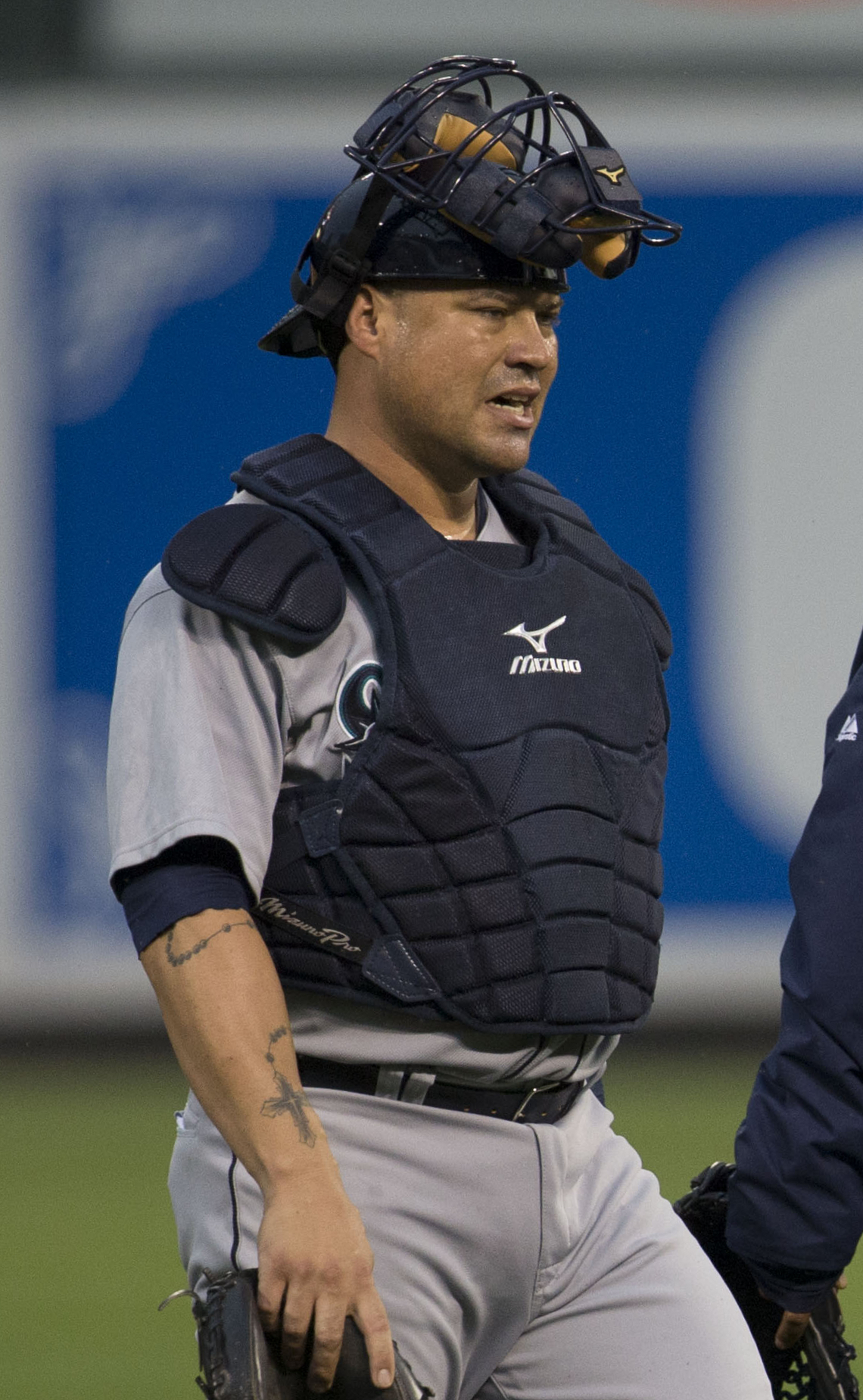
Quintero with the Seattle Mariners in 2013

On July 26, 2013, Quintero was signed by the Seattle Mariners. He re- signed with Seattle on a minor league deal on January 6, 2014.

After spending the 2014 Triple-A season with the Tacoma Rainiers, Quintero was added to the Mariners' roster on September 1, when the rosters expanded.

=== Boston Red Sox ===
On January 21, 2015, Quintero signed a minor league deal with the Boston Red Sox. He elected free agency on November 6.

=== Toronto Blue Jays ===
On November 20, 2015, Quintero signed a minor league contract with the Toronto Blue Jays. He was released on April 18, 2016.

=== Detroit Tigers ===
On April 19, 2016, Quintero signed a minor league deal with the Detroit Tigers and was assigned to the Triple-A Toledo Mud Hens. He was released on May 24.

== Coaching career ==
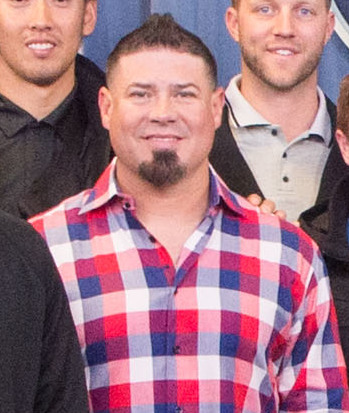
Qiuntero with the Diamondbacks at the Pentagon in 2018

In June 2016, Quintero became the second bullpen catcher for the Arizona Diamondbacks.

== See also ==
- List of players from Venezuela in Major League Baseball
