= Coline Creuzot =

American singer and Sony ATV songwriter

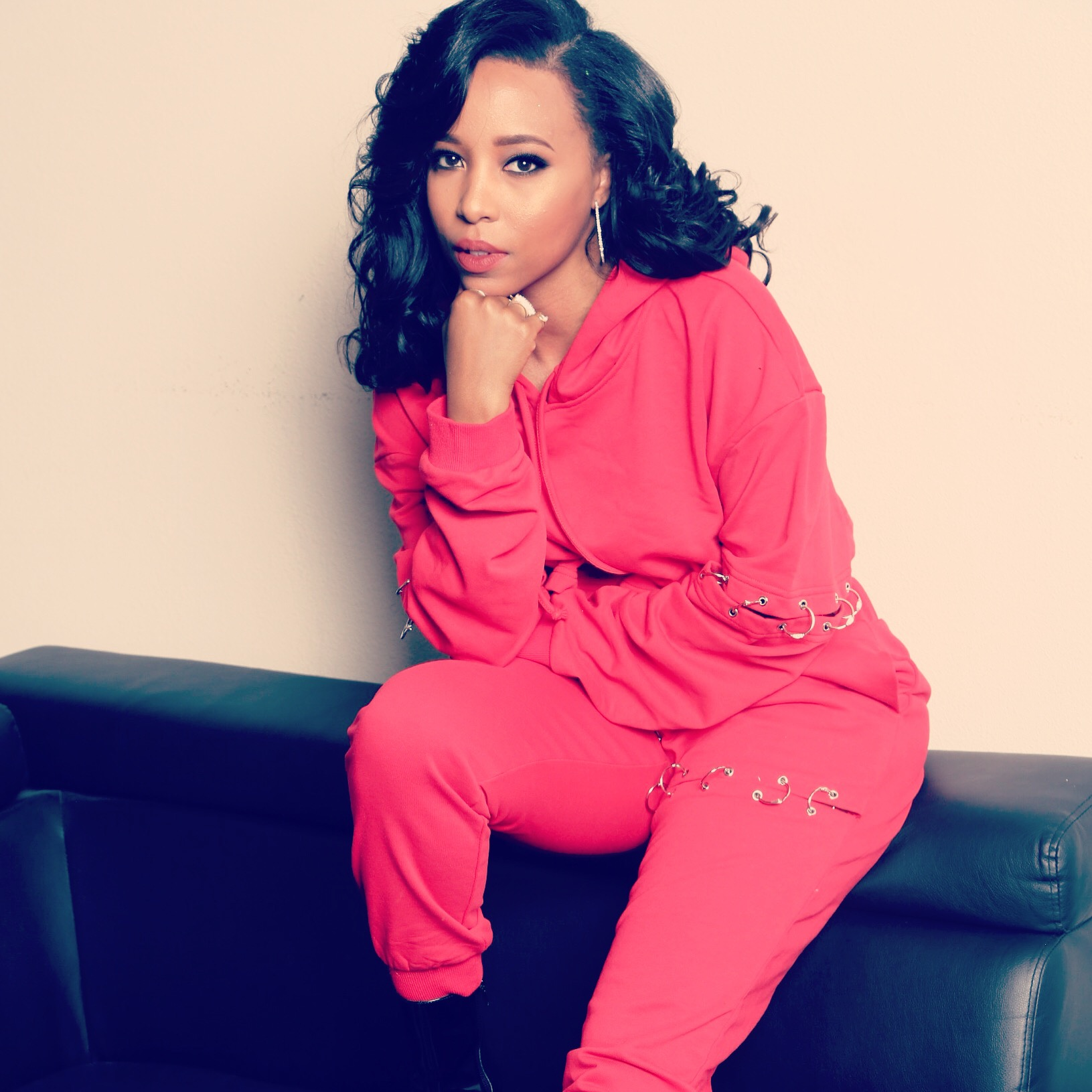

Background information
- Born: August 19, 1985 (age 39); Houston, Texas, United States
- Genres: R&B; Soul; Pop
- Occupation(s): Singer, songwriter
- Labels: Sony ATV
- Website: www.colinecreuzot.com

Coline Creuzot is an American singer and Sony ATV songwriter.

== Early life ==
Coline Creuzot was born in Houston, Texas. At the age of three, Creuzot took up dance where she realized her passion for the performing arts. She began to sing and write songs by ten years old and was a part of a girl group before she reached her teenage years. Creuzot attended Lamar High School and went on to receive a degree in business management from Hampton University.

== Career ==
After graduating college, Creuzot returned to Houston to pursue a full-time music career, releasing her first mixtape "Head Turner" in 2008. Creuzot worked with music producer Happy Perez on her 2008 debut single "Give-And-Take." The track gained popularity in Creuzot's hometown of Houston and reached #1 for six weeks on Houston radio charts. Following the success of "Give-And-Take," Creuzot opened up for artists, such as T.I., Drake, T-Pain, David Banner, and Keyshia Cole.

Upon her return to Houston, Creuzot connected with notable artists on the Houston music scene. Creuzot has also collaborated with established Houston rappers Paul Wall, Slim Thug, Lil' KeKe, and Z-Ro. Creuzot also appeared as background dancer/singer in Solange Knowles' music video for "I Decided" in 2008.

She eventually caught the attention of Sony ATV (formerly known as EMI). Creuzot was signed to the music publishing company as a songwriter in 2011.

Creuzot's single, "Truth Is", peaked at #24 on Billboard (magazine)'s Adult R&B Songs chart in 2016.

Creuzot now resides in L.A. and continues to further her career as a singer and songwriter, working with Grammy nominated & award-winning singers, songwriters and producers.

Most recently, Creuzot opened for Keyshia Cole, K. Michelle and Tank at the theatre at Arena Place on May 26, 2019.

Creuzot released "Truth Is", featuring Trina, on September 20, 2019, and her most recent single, "F*CK FEELINGS", was released on October 28, 2019.

== Artistry ==
=== Musical style ===
Creuzot describes her musical style as a blend of "R&B soul and pop." The subject matter of most of her songs centers around topics such as female empowerment, relationships, love, and heartache. Creuzot explains in a recent interview "I draw off of things that go on in my life (past, present and my hopes for the future), and my outlet is to write and sing about it …You have to figure out how to channel things in a positive way."

=== Influences ===
Creuzot draws inspiration from contemporary R&B, old school soul/R&B and country music. She cites artists Donny Hathaway, Sam Cooke, Aaliyah and Beyoncé as influences on her music.

== Personal life ==
Creuzot is the granddaughter of Percy Creuzot Jr, founder of Frenchy's Chicken, a popular creole restaurant chain based in Houston.

Creuzot is married to the former journeyman baseball player, Jason Bourgeois, and they had their first child, Mireille, in 2015.

== Discography ==
Singles
Title	Year
Give-And-Take	2008
Acapella Now	2013
You Tried It	2014
Truth Is	2015
Show Me	2016
Numb	2016
Dead End	2017
High Life	2017
You Give	2018
Link Up (featuring Paul Wall)	2018
You Got It	2019
Truth Is (featuring Trina)	2019
F*CK FEELINGS	2019

Mixtapes and EPs
Title	Year	Format
Head Turner	2008	Mixtape
Diamond in the Rough	2009	Mixtape
Clarity	2010	Mixtape
Welcome To My World	2010	Mixtape
The Chase	2011	Mixtape
Acapella Now	2012	EP
