= Geoff Blum =

American baseball player and analyst (born 1973)

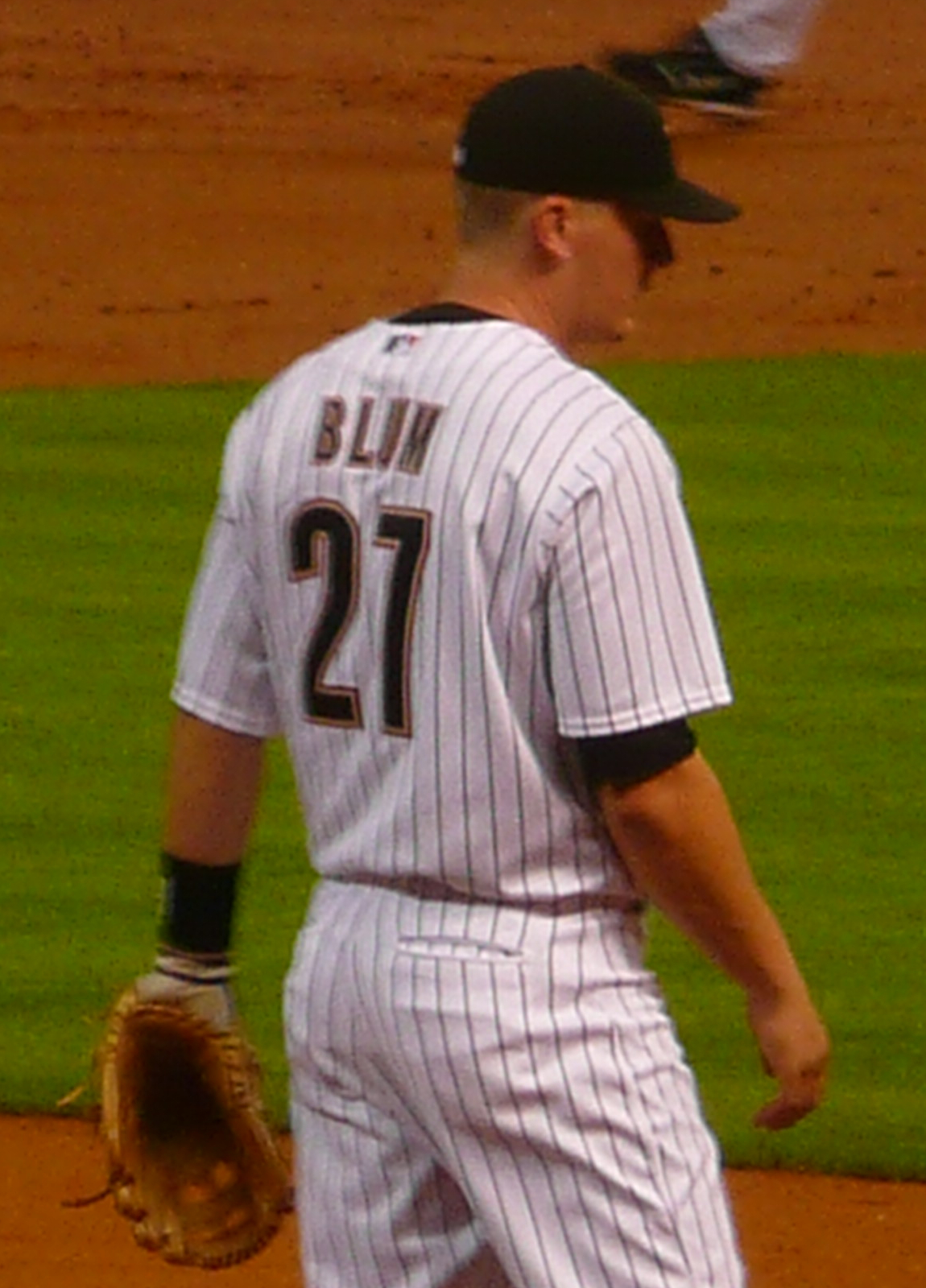
- Blum with the Houston Astros in 2008
- Infielder
- Born: April 26, 1973 (age 53); Redwood City, California, U.S.
- Batted: Switch Threw: Right

MLB debut
- August 9, 1999, for the Montreal Expos

Last MLB appearance
- July 17, 2012, for the Arizona Diamondbacks

MLB statistics
- Batting average: .250
- Home runs: 99
- Runs batted in: 479
- Stats at Baseball Reference

Teams
- Montreal Expos (1999–2001); Houston Astros (2002–2003); Tampa Bay Devil Rays (2004); San Diego Padres (2005); Chicago White Sox (2005); San Diego Padres (2006–2007); Houston Astros (2008–2010); Arizona Diamondbacks (2011–2012)

Career highlights and awards
- World Series champion (2005)

Geoffrey Edward Blum (born April 26, 1973) is an American former professional baseball infielder in Major League Baseball who played for the Montreal Expos, Houston Astros, Tampa Bay Devil Rays, San Diego Padres, Chicago White Sox and Arizona Diamondbacks. He is currently the TV color analyst for the Houston Astros.

== Early life ==
He was born in Redwood City but grew up in Chino, California where he played baseball in Chino. Chino High retired his number - #11 - in a ceremony where he credited "...his father for instilling in him the love of the game and his mother for taking him to practices and games."

Before becoming a professional baseball player, he majored in sociology at the University of California, Berkeley and played for the California Golden Bears baseball team. In 1993, he played collegiate summer baseball with the Brewster Whitecaps of the Cape Cod Baseball League and was named a league all-star.

== Professional career ==
=== Montreal Expos ===
He began his professional career when he was selected in the seventh round of the 1994 amateur draft by the Montreal Expos. During his time with the Expos, he spent the winter of 1995 in the Australian Baseball League with the Hunter Eagles.

=== Houston Astros ===
On March 12, 2002, after playing in Montreal for three years, he was traded to the Houston Astros in exchange for Chris Truby.

=== Tampa Bay Devil Rays ===
He was then traded after the 2003 season to Tampa Bay Devil Rays in exchange for Brandon Backe. In 2004, he batted only .215 for the Devil Rays, with a .266 on-base percentage.

=== San Diego Padres ===
Blum signed with the San Diego Padres as a free agent on December 9, 2004. He hit .241 in 78 games for the Padres in 2005.

=== Chicago White Sox ===
The Padres traded Blum to the Chicago White Sox for a minor leaguer on July 31, 2005.

On October 25, 2005, Blum hit a home run against the Astros at Minute Maid Park in the top of the 14th inning that served as the go-ahead run in the eventual victory for the Sox in Game 3 of the World Series.

On April 11, 2008, a monument celebrating the 2005 World Series was unveiled at U.S. Cellular Field in Chicago, featuring bronze statues of five players. Blum is one of them, commemorating his tie-breaking home run. The home run would forever cement his place in White Sox history.

=== San Diego Padres ===
He returned to the Padres as a free agent in 2006.

=== Houston Astros ===
On November 20, 2007, Blum signed a $1.1 million, one-year contract with the Houston Astros. The deal also included a club option for 2009.

Blum returned to the Astros in 2009 and played mostly 3B for Houston. He hit 10 home runs that season, drove in 49 runs and was known for playing excellent defense at all the infield positions.

On October 30, 2009, Blum re-signed with the Astros. The contract was worth $1.5 million for the 2010 season and included a mutual option for 2011, which would be worth $1.65 million that was declined, making him a free agent.

Blum suffered a season-ending injury to his elbow in July 2010 while putting on his shirt after a game. He had this to say: "There are probably 90 percent of us in the big leagues that have loose bodies floating around. It just so happens that after the game, it tightened up on me. The shirt had nothing to do with the damn injury." Following the season, Blum was recognized with the Darryl Kile Good Guy Award.

=== Arizona Diamondbacks ===
On November 15, 2010, Blum signed a two-year contract worth $2.7 million with the Arizona Diamondbacks. In 2 years with the Diamondbacks, he appeared in a total of 40 games out of 326 possible games due to injury. He was released by the Diamondbacks on July 20, 2012.

== Broadcasting career ==
On January 12, 2013, he was named a color analyst of the Houston Astros for Comcast SportsNet Houston, where he worked with Bill Brown and Alan Ashby. In 2017, he was teamed with a new play-by-play man in Todd Kalas. Blum and Kalas have served as broadcast partners for the Astros (under Space City Home Network) since 2017.

He resides in Houston, Texas.
