= Henry Villar =

Dominican baseball player (born 1987)

- Pitcher
- Born: May 24, 1987 (age 39); Bonao, Dominican Republic
- Batted: Right Threw: Right

MLB debut
- September 10, 2010, for the Houston Astros

Last appearance
- October 2, 2010, for the Houston Astros

MLB statistics
- Win–loss record: 0–0
- Earned run average: 4.50
- Strikeouts: 3
- Stats at Baseball Reference

Teams
- Houston Astros (2010)

Henry Villar (born May 24, 1987) is a Dominican right-handed former Major League Baseball (MLB) pitcher.

Villar began his professional career in 2006 with the Dominican Summer Astros, going 1–1 with a 2.16 ERA in 13 games (seven starts). He spent 2007 with the DSL Astros as well, going 4–4 with a 2.45 ERA in 13 starts. In 2008, he pitched for the Greeneville Astros, going 3–6 with a 4.41 ERA in 13 starts. With the Lexington Legends in 2009, he was used primarily as a relief pitcher, going 3–4 with a 2.60 ERA in 43 games (three starts).

Villar made his major league debut with the Astros on September 10, 2010. He made eight appearances for the Astros in 2010, all as a relief pitcher.
