= Jason Castro (baseball) =

American baseball catcher (born 1987)

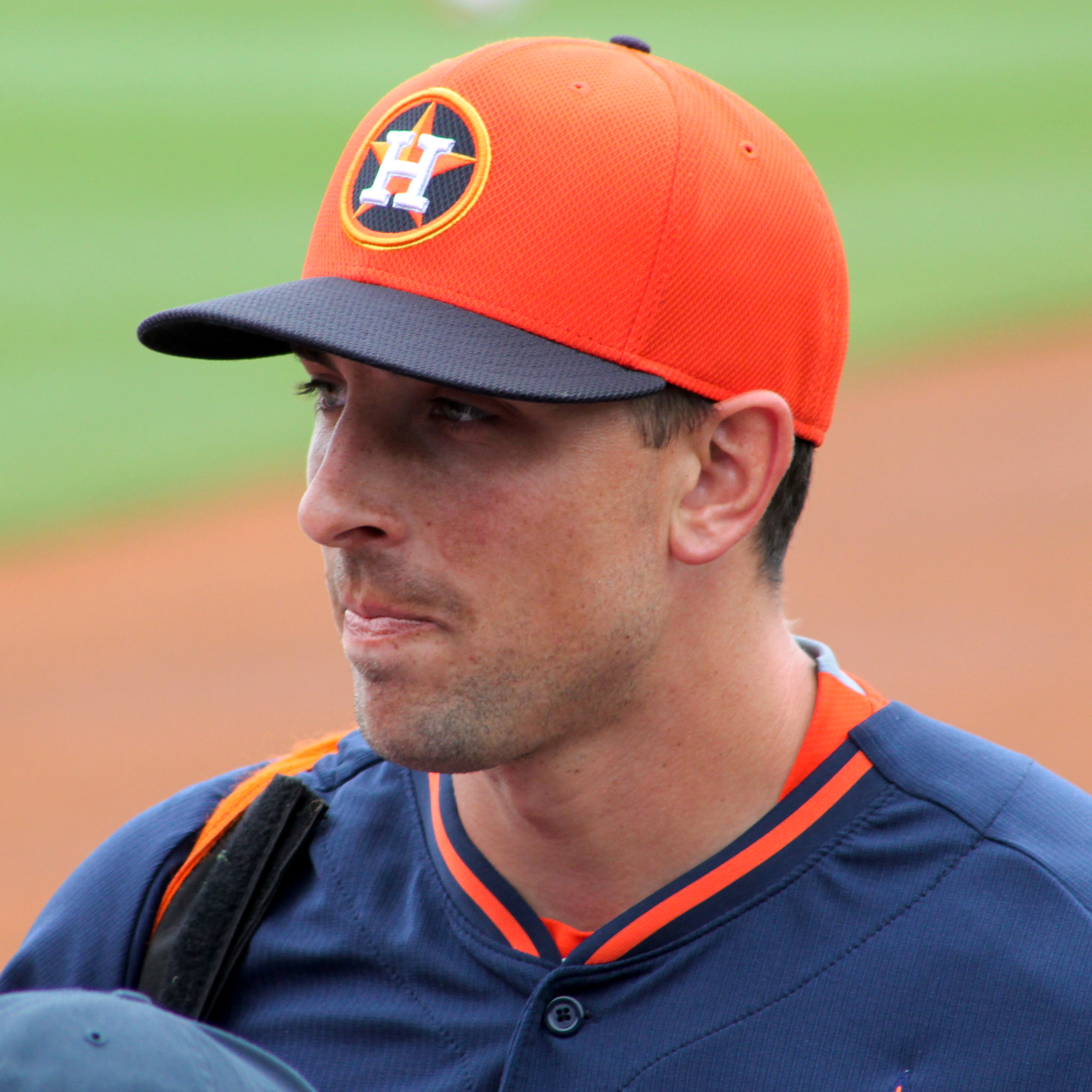
- Castro at spring training in 2015
- Catcher
- Born: June 18, 1987 (age 39); Castro Valley, California, U.S.
- Batted: Left Threw: Right

MLB debut
- June 22, 2010, for the Houston Astros

Last MLB appearance
- June 29, 2022, for the Houston Astros

MLB statistics
- Batting average: .227
- Home runs: 97
- Runs batted in: 325
- Stats at Baseball Reference

Teams
- Houston Astros (2010, 2012–2016); Minnesota Twins (2017–2019); Los Angeles Angels (2020); San Diego Padres (2020); Houston Astros (2021–2022)

Career highlights and awards
- All-Star (2013)
Medals
Men's baseball
Representing United States
Baseball World Cup
Gold medal – first place	2009 Nettuno	Team

Jason Michael Castro (born June 18, 1987) is an American former professional baseball catcher. He played in Major League Baseball (MLB) for the Houston Astros, Minnesota Twins, Los Angeles Angels, and San Diego Padres. After playing college baseball at Stanford University, he was selected by the Astros in the first round of the 2008 Major League Baseball draft (#10 overall). Castro made his big league debut with Houston in 2010. He was selected to the 2013 All-Star Game, serving as a reserve catcher, which made him the first Astro All-Star elected to play for the American League.

== Early life ==
Jason Michael Castro was born on June 18, 1987, in Castro Valley, California. Castro played high school baseball at Castro Valley High School. He played junior varsity basketball at Castro Valley High School for the legendary Coach Burns.

== College career ==
Castro attended Stanford University, where he played college baseball for the Stanford Cardinal. He was named the club's most valuable player his junior year. After his sophomore season in 2007, he played collegiate summer baseball for the Yarmouth–Dennis Red Sox of the Cape Cod Baseball League, where he batted .341 in 39 games, was named the starting catcher for the East Division All-Star team, and helped lead the Red Sox to the league championship.

== Professional career ==
=== Draft and minor leagues ===
Castro was selected by the Astros in the first round (tenth overall) of the 2008 Major League Baseball draft. Castro started in Single-A for the Tri-City ValleyCats in 2008. He was promoted to play for the Class AA Corpus Christi Hooks on June 7, 2009, after playing in Advanced-A for the Lancaster JetHawks and played his first game for the team on June 10. He also played for the United States national team in the 2009 Baseball World Cup in Nettuno, Italy.

Castro was selected to play for the United States team in the 2009 All-Star Futures Game in St. Louis. In the game, he threw out a runner and hit a three-run home run. He was ranked 53rd on Baseball America's list of "Top 100 Prospects" in 2009. Shortly after the Futures Game, the Astros sent Castro home early from the Arizona Fall League so that he could rest for the 2010 season.

=== Houston Astros (2010, 2012–2016) ===
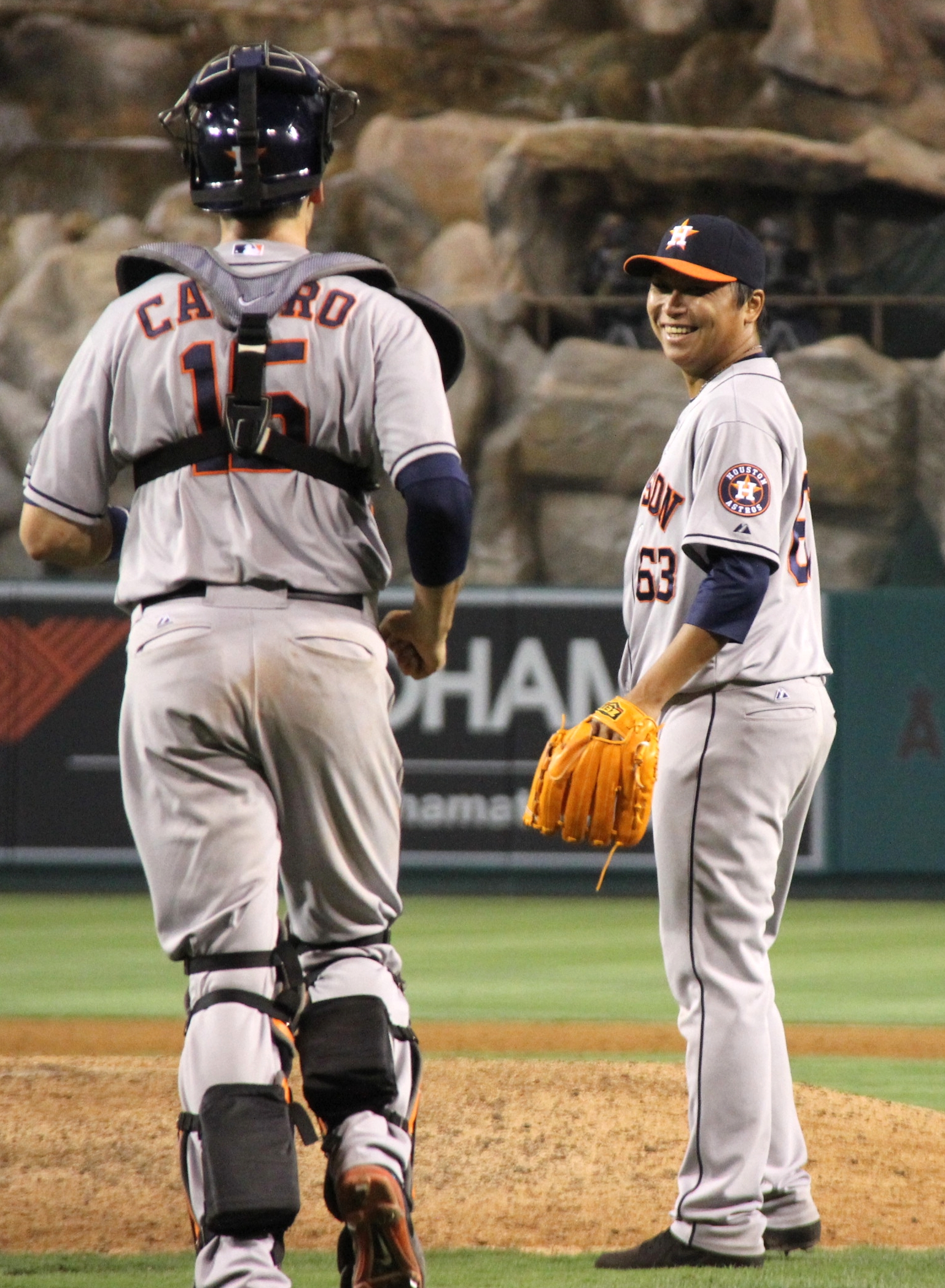
Castro with Chia-Jen Lo for the Houston Astros in 2013

On June 20, 2010, the Astros promoted Castro to the MLB from the Class AAA Round Rock Express. He made his MLB debut on June 22, 2010, at Minute Maid Park against the San Francisco Giants. He singled off Tim Lincecum in his first career at-bat. Castro hit his first major league home run on June 24, 2010, against Matt Cain.

On March 2, 2011, while playing in a spring training game against the Detroit Tigers, Castro suffered a knee injury while running to first base. He underwent surgery two days later, on March 4, to repair his torn anterior cruciate ligament and a damaged meniscus. As a result, he missed the entire 2011 season.

On June 13, 2012, while pinch-hitting for Xavier Cedeño, Castro grounded out to Joaquin Arias to record the last out for Matt Cain's perfect game. He played 87 games in the 2012 season, finishing the year with a .257 batting average, 6 home runs and 29 RBI. He was recognized by the Houston chapter of the Baseball Writers' Association of America (BBWAA) in 2012 as the recipient of the Darryl Kile Good Guy Award.

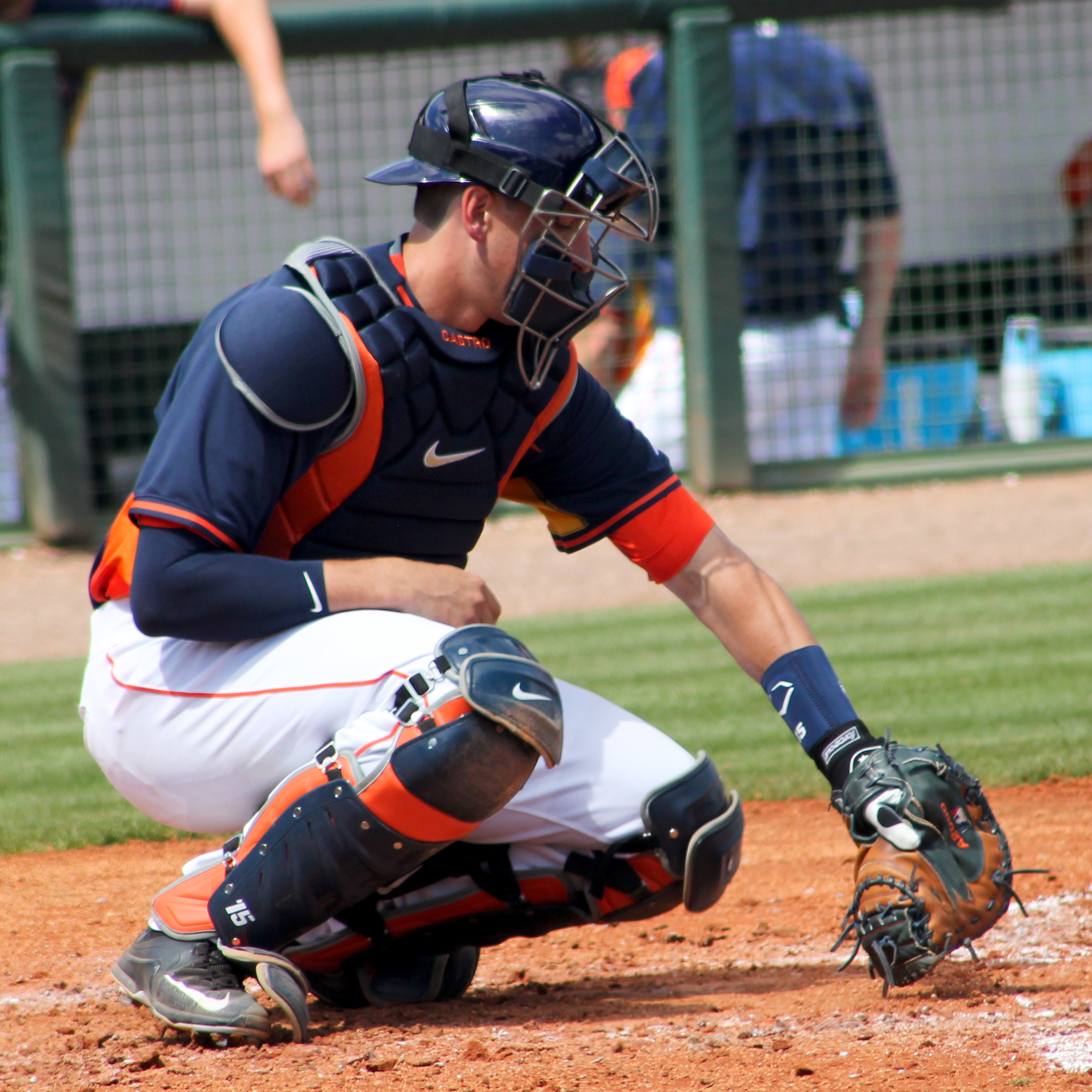
Castro blocks a pitch during spring training in March 2015.

On May 20, 2013, Castro was awarded the honor of being American League (AL) Player of the Week. He earned his first All-Star Game selection that season as a reserve catcher, but did not appear in the game. Castro became Houston's second catcher to garner selection to the All-Star Game, succeeding Craig Biggio in 1991. (Note: For single seasons, Played at least 50% of games at C, Playing for HOU, is an All-Star, in the regular season, sorted by ascending Season..) On July 31, he connected for his first grand slam, off Miguel González of the Baltimore Orioles. Castro led the Astros with a .350 OBP. He set club catcher records with 63 runs, 18 home runs (16 of which were hit as a catcher, tying John Bateman's club record — two were while playing as a DH), and a .485 slugging percentage. In September, he had surgery to remove a cyst from his knee and missed the rest of the season. He played 120 games that year.

After the 2013 season, Castro completed the degree that he had started at Stanford. When he was drafted, he was 25 credits shy of the degree. He had returned to Stanford in the 2010 offseason to begin taking the rest of the courses, but he was delayed by rehabilitation from his 2011 injury.

Before the 2014 season, Castro signed a one-year contract with the Astros worth $2.45 million. Before the 2015 season, he signed another one-year contract with the Astros, worth $4 million. In 2015, he batted .211.

In 2016, he batted .210.

=== Minnesota Twins (2017–2019) ===
On November 30, 2016, Castro signed a three-year contract worth $24.5 million with the Minnesota Twins. In his first season with the Twins, Castro hit .242 with 10 home runs and 47 RBIs in 110 games.

On May 16, 2018, it was revealed that Castro was diagnosed with a torn meniscus in his right knee, which required season-ending surgery. In 2018 he batted .143.

In 2019, Castro played in only 79 games for the Twins due to sharing time with Mitch Garver, who had a breakout year. He hit .232 with 13 home runs and 30 RBIs.

=== Los Angeles Angels (2020) ===
On January 7, 2020, Castro signed a one-year, $6.85 million deal with the Los Angeles Angels.

On July 24, 2020, Castro made his Angels debut as an Opening Day starting catcher. With the Angels, he batted .192.

=== San Diego Padres (2020) ===
On August 30, 2020, the Angels traded Castro to the San Diego Padres for Gerardo Reyes. In 27 games split between the Angels and Padres, Castro batted .188/.293/.375 with two home runs and 9 RBI in 80 at-bats.

=== Return to Houston (2021–2022) ===
On January 22, 2021, Castro signed a two-year, $7 million contract to return to Houston.

In the 2021 regular season, he batted .235, and .180 against left-handlers. On defense, he caught stealing 13% of runners, catching 4 runners while yielding 27 stolen bases.

In Game 2 of the American League Championship Series versus the Boston Red Sox, he hit a home run in a 9–5 loss. It was his first and only postseason home run. On October 19, in Game 4 at Fenway Park, Castro played a key part in the series. With two out in a 2–2 tie, he singled home Carlos Correa in the top of the ninth inning off Nathan Eovaldi to drive Correa home. The run was the first of seven that the Astros scored in the inning, with the Astros going on to win 9–2, tying the series at 2–2 after the Red Sox had won two in a row. Two games later, the Astros won the pennant to send Castro (who went 2-for-3 in the ALCS) to his first World Series. Prior to Game 4 of the 2021 World Series, Castro was removed from the Astros roster due to COVID-19 protocols, and he was replaced for the rest of the series by Garrett Stubbs.

On June 29, 2022, Castro, along with ace Justin Verlander, helped lead a 2–0 shutout of the New York Mets. Castro's two-run home run supplied all the offense in the game while tripling his RBI season total from one to three. On July 1, 2022, the Astros placed Castro on the 10-day injured list due to left knee discomfort. On August 2, the Astros announced that Castro underwent surgery on the left knee and would miss the remainder of the season. This made his home run his last at-bat. Due to the injury, Castro was unable to make an appearance for the Astros in the 2022 postseason but still earned his first career championship ring as the Astros went on to win the World Series against the Philadelphia Phillies in six games.

== Retirement ==
On December 2, 2022, Castro announced on Twitter that he was retiring from Major League Baseball.

Upon his retirement, Castro ranked as the Astros' career leader among catchers in home runs (71), and his 717 games at the position ranked third behind Alan Ashby and Brad Ausmus.

== Personal life ==
Castro married Maris Perlman in late 2012. They met at Stanford, where Perlman played lacrosse. The couple founded Castro's Kids, a Houston-area literacy program. The couple has three children, 2 boys and 1 girl.

== See also ==
- Houston Astros award winners and league leaders
- List of Houston Astros no-hitters
- List of Major League Baseball career putouts as a catcher leaders
- List of Major League Baseball no-hitters
- List of Major League Baseball players with a home run in their final major league at bat
- List of Mexican Americans
- List of Stanford University people
