= Casey Daigle =

American baseball player (born 1981)

- Pitcher
- Born: April 4, 1981 (age 45); Lake Charles, Louisiana, U.S.
- Batted: Right Threw: Right

MLB debut
- April 9, 2004, for the Arizona Diamondbacks

Last MLB appearance
- July 18, 2010, for the Houston Astros

MLB statistics
- Win–loss record: 3–4
- Earned run average: 7.16
- Strikeouts: 30
- Stats at Baseball Reference

Teams
- Arizona Diamondbacks (2004, 2006); Houston Astros (2010)

Sean Casey Daigle (born April 4, 1981) is an American former professional pitcher. He played in Major League Baseball for the Arizona Diamondbacks and Houston Astros.

== Professional career ==
=== Arizona Diamondbacks ===
Daigle made his major league debut in 2004, giving up five home runs in less than three innings. As of 2020, he is the only pitcher in Major League history to allow five or more home runs in his debut. He started 10 games for the Diamondbacks in 2004. His ERA was at 7.16 with a strikeout to walk ratio of 17/27 in 49 innings.

In 2005, he was sent down to Double A where he pitched out of the bullpen for most of the season.

In 2006, Daigle pitched out of the bullpen in Triple-A Tucson, while appearing in 10 games with the Arizona Diamondbacks. During his time with the Sidewinders, Daigle starred on a TV show chronicling the life of a minor leaguer, along with Carlos Quentin, Chris Young, Bill Murphy, and Dustin Nippert.

=== Minnesota Twins ===
Daigle signed with the Minnesota Twins in December 2007. He was released on August 25, 2008 after posting a record of 1–5 in 44 games with the Twins' AAA affiliate, the Rochester Red Wings. His ERA stood at 3.78 in 69 innings.

=== Texas Rangers ===
In December 2008, Daigle signed a minor league contract with the Texas Rangers. He was released during spring training.

=== Houston Astros ===
In April 2009, Daigle signed a minor league contract with the Houston Astros. He spent the whole season in AAA, appearing in 49 games. He was called up on June 1, 2010, for the first time since the 2006 season.

He was designated for assignment on July 18, 2010. He cleared waivers and stayed at AAA, finishing with a 4.91 ERA and 8 saves in 35 games.

=== San Francisco Giants ===
On January 14, 2011, Daigle signed a minor league contract with the San Francisco Giants and pitched for AAA-affiliate Fresno Grizzlies. In his lone season in Fresno, he had a 5.97 ERA in 36 games.

== Personal life ==
Daigle married softball pitcher Jennie Finch on January 15, 2005, at the Crystal Cathedral in Garden Grove, California. They have three children, sons born in May 2006, and June 2011 and a daughter in January 2013.
