= 2009 St. Louis Cardinals season =

Major League Baseball season

2009 St. Louis Cardinals
- National League Central champions
- League: National League
- Division: Central
- Ballpark: Busch Stadium
- City: St. Louis, Missouri
- Record: 91–71 (.562)
- Divisional place: 1st
- Owners: William DeWitt, Jr., Fred Hanser
- General managers: John Mozeliak
- Managers: Tony La Russa
- Television: FS Midwest (Dan McLaughlin, Al Hrabosky); KSDK (NBC 5) (Jay Randolph, Rick Horton)
- Radio: KTRS (Mike Shannon, John Rooney)

The 2009 St. Louis Cardinals season was the 128th season for the St. Louis Cardinals, a Major League Baseball franchise in St. Louis, Missouri. It was the 118th season for the Cardinals in the National League and their 4th at Busch Stadium III.

The Cardinals, coming off an 86–76 season and fourth place in the NL Central, got off to a strong start in April before a team-wide offensive breakdown caused them to fall behind the Cubs in the NL Central standings. Brilliant seasons from starting pitchers Chris Carpenter, Adam Wainwright, and Joel Piñeiro helped St. Louis to stay in contention until the key midseason acquisitions of Matt Holliday, Mark DeRosa, and Julio Lugo revived the Cardinal offense. An August 20–6 effectively ended the National League Central race, and the Cardinals won the division with a 91–71 record, seven-and-a-half games better than the second-place Cubs. However, their playoff run ended quickly when they were swept in three games by the Los Angeles Dodgers in the NLDS. The Cardinals also hosted the All-Star Game on July 14.

== Offseason departures and acquisitions ==
=== Hitters ===
The Cardinals retained the services of backup catcher Jason LaRue, signing him to another one-year contract.

On December 4, 2008, the Cardinals agreed to a trade with the San Diego Padres sending reliever Mark Worrell and a player-to-be-named-later (the Padres eventually chose minor-league pitcher Luke Gregerson) in exchange for shortstop Khalil Greene, who will make $6.5 mil, and will be eligible for free agency after 2009. Greene replaced César Izturis, who departed via free agency.

Utility infielder Aaron Miles, a member of the 2006 World Series champion Cardinals, signed a two-year deal on December 31 to play with the Cubs. Felipe López, who became the starting second baseman after a 2008 deadline trade and hit .385 for the Cardinals in two months, became a free agent and signed with the Diamondbacks. The third and last second baseman on the 2008 Cardinals, Adam Kennedy, was given his unconditional release on February 9. With no second baseman with significant big-league experience on the roster, outfielder Skip Schumaker was tabbed to make the unusual transition. Late in training camp Schumaker was designated the official starting second baseman.

Third baseman Troy Glaus underwent right shoulder surgery on January 21, 2009, and was originally expected to miss Opening Day (April 6) and probably most of April. Glaus' progress in rehabbing his repaired right shoulder stalled, and he did not return until September (see below).

=== Pitchers ===
Kyle Lohse, who went 15–6 with a 3.78 ERA after signing a one-year contract with the 2008 Cardinals, was re-signed to a hefty four-year, $41 mil. contract on September 29, 2008, the day after the season ended. Mark Mulder's injury-plagued time in St. Louis ended when the Cardinals declined to pick up his $11 mil. option, but instead bought out the remaining year of his contract in 2009 for $1.5 mil.

In December, the Cardinals declined to offer arbitration to relief pitchers Russ Springer and Jason Isringhausen, starter Braden Looper, and relievers Tyler Johnson and Randy Flores. St. Louis made no attempt to retain lefty reliever Ron Villone, who eventually signed with the Mets. On Dec 3, to fill the lack of left-handed relievers caused by the departure of Flores, Johnson, and Villone, they signed lefty relief specialist Trever Miller to a one-year deal potentially worth $2 million if he reaches all the incentives in the contract.

On January 5, the Cardinals signed lefty reliever Royce Ring who was with the 2008 Atlanta Braves, to a one-year contract. However, two months later the Cardinals signed Dennys Reyes, a 31-yr.-old left-handed relief specialist, to a two-year deal worth approximately $3 mil. A few weeks after the acquisition of Reyes, Ring was placed on waivers, eventually accepting an assignment to the minor leagues.

== Spring training ==
St. Louis went 19-12-2 in Grapefruit League play, their most victories since they had 21 wins in 1997. Attendance at RDS was 106,266 in 18 home games (9-7-2) for an average home attendance of 5,901. In 15 road games (10-5-0), attendance 84,499; road average 5,633.

On March 30, relief pitcher Chris Perez was optioned to AAA, finalizing the pitching situation for Opening Day. Cardinals will carry 12 pitchers, including seven relievers which include long-reliever Brad Thompson. Rookie Jason Motte appeared to win the closer job, although the Cardinals made no official announcement.

Joe Mather was the final cut in spring training. Among the players making the Cardinals out of camp were utility infielders Joe Thurston and Brian Barden and two players making their big-league debuts: David Freese, who took the injured Troy Glaus' spot at third base, and former first-round draft pick (and highly anticipated prospect) Colby Rasmus. Mather's demotion left Ryan Ludwick as the only outfielder on the roster who hits right-handed.

== Regular season ==
=== April ===
Opening Day 2009 looked a lot like 2008: a blown save and a bullpen loss. Rookie closer Jason Motte gave up four runs with two outs in the ninth inning, and the Pirates beat the Cardinals 6–4.

On April 7, the Cardinals beat the Pirates 9-3 as Albert Pujols hit his first home run of the season and reached base five times. As such, Pujols became only the third Cardinals player in the last 55 years to reach base four or more times in each of the first two games of the season. On April 8, the Cardinals lost to the Pirates by a score of 7–4, but Albert Pujols set the franchise record for most assists by a first baseman in a 9-inning game with seven. It was the most assists by a Major League first baseman since the National League record of eight was set in 1971. Pujols also collected his 700th career walk in the game.

On April 9, Chris Carpenter and relievers Franklin and Reyes combined on a one-hitter as the Cardinals beat Pittsburgh 2–1. It was Carpenter's first victory since Game 3 of the 2006 World Series, October 24. St. Louis followed up the Pittsburgh series with a three-game sweep over Houston. In the second game of the Astro series (Apr. 11), Pujols tied a career best with seven RBI as the Cardinals won 11–2; while in the final game Kyle Lohse retired 24 consecutive batters en route to a 3-0 complete game victory.

On April 14, staff ace Chris Carpenter injured his left rib cage while batting. Early estimates were that he would miss at least a month, and it might be as long as two months. An MRI exam on April 16 revealed an oblique tear on his left side. On April 17, rookie pitcher P. J. Walters was called up from AAA-Memphis to take Carpenter's spot in the rotation.

On April 20 the Cardinals attempted to buttress a sagging bullpen by trading former Rule 5 draft pick Brian Barton for Atlanta Braves' relief pitcher Blaine Boyer. Boyer was tabbed to join the big-league club, leaving St. Louis with 13 pitchers on the 25-man roster, with David Freese optioned to Memphis.

On Saturday, April 25, in a nationally televised game on Fox, with the Cardinals leading 3–1 in the seventh inning against the Chicago Cubs, Albert Pujols hit his 8th career grand slam, helping the team win its 5th consecutive game (8-2) and solidifying their lead in the NL Central division. The slam also gave him 1,002 RBIs, making him the 260th player to reach the 1,000-level.

Brendan Ryan went to the 15-day DL with a hamstring strain on April 30, and former first-round draft pick Tyler Greene was called up to be Ryan's replacement. The Cardinals finished the month of April with a 16–7 record, best in baseball. Albert Pujols was named Player of the Month for April and Brian Barden Rookie of the Month.

=== May ===
Center fielder Rick Ankiel ran face-first into the outfield wall while making a catch on May 4. Three days later, he was placed on the DL (retroactive to May 5), and minor-league outfielder Shane Robinson was called up to take his place on the roster. On May 12, right fielder Ryan Ludwick joined Ankiel on the DL after straining his right hamstring against the Pirates. The team recalled Nick Stavinoha from its AAA-Memphis team to take Ludwick's spot on the roster.

The injuries to Ankiel and Ludwick, combined with the continuing absence of Carpenter, contributed to a 4-10 stretch that dropped the Cardinals out of first place in the NL Central. In a showdown series between the Cardinals and Brewers May 16–18, Milwaukee swept St. Louis in St. Louis, winning three games by a combined score of 17–6. In the opener, Wainwright held the Brewers to two hits in eight innings but still lost, 1–0, on a Corey Hart home run. In the second game, Cardinal pitchers walked eight batters and hit four; in the third game, they walked eleven and hit one. Milwaukee took over first place in the Central.

On May 20, Chris Carpenter returned after missing a month with a strained oblique. Carpenter pitched five shutout innings, and the Cards won a pitching duel with the Cubs, 2–1. In his next start Carpenter was perfect for six innings, but St. Louis lost in 10 innings to Milwaukee, 1–0. Carpenter's ERA remained at 0.00 after his first four appearances. The two Carpenter starts were part of a nine-game streak for Cardinal pitching in which they held the opposition to three runs or less in every game and did not allow a home run.

On the 29th Ludwick was activated from the DL. To make room, the Cardinals put Khalil Greene on the DL with "social anxiety disorder". Greene, signed with the intention of being the everyday shortstop in 2009, played poorly in the field, was hitting .200 at the time he hit the DL, and had been playing less and less frequently in May. St. Louis went 13–14 in May and finished the month at 29–21, one game behind Milwaukee in the NL Central. The Cardinals spent the month of May in a horrific team batting slump that saw them post a .299 OBP for the month, dead last in baseball; exceptionally strong pitching in May (3.56 team ERA) helped St. Louis stay close to the top of the NL Central standings.

=== June ===
On June 4, the Cardinals released newly acquired pitcher Blaine Boyer and called up Jess Todd to take his place. One day later, Kyle Lohse, still suffering from the aftereffects of a hit-by-pitch on his throwing forearm, May 23, went to the DL for the first time in his career, and infielder Tyler Greene recalled. The day after that (June 6), pitcher Blake Hawksworth became the 13th rookie to play for the Cardinals in 2009 (a major-league high for any team) and the seventh to make his major-league debut, when he was called up and Jess Todd was sent down.

The continuing team-wide offensive blackout reached its nadir in the second week of June, when the Colorado Rockies, second-worst team in the NL with a 21–32 record prior to the series, came to St. Louis and swept the Cardinals in four games, outscoring the Cardinals 33–9.

Khalil Greene, after three weeks on the disabled list due to anxiety disorder, was activated on June 18. In his first start since being activated, on June 19, Greene started at third base and hit a home run. He went on to hit a home run in each of his first three games back, helping the Cardinals to sweep Kansas City in Kansas City and reclaim sole possession of first place in the NL Central. However, Greene went 0 for his next 16, suffered a relapse of his social anxiety disorder, and went back on the disabled list.

On June 27, in an effort to revive a sputtering offense, the Cardinals acquired Mark DeRosa from Cleveland for Chris Perez and a player to be named later. DeRosa, who in his career has played every position but pitcher, catcher, and center field, was expected to play third base for St. Louis. One month later Cleveland selected Jess Todd to complete the deal.

A continuing inability to hit (.310 OBP for June) weighed down the Cardinals for another month: they went 12-17 for June to drop their record for 2009 to 41–38.

=== July ===
On July 5, Albert Pujols and Yadier Molina were named as winners of the fan balloting and starters for the National League in the 80th All-Star Game. Ryan Franklin, 20 for 21 in save opportunities with a 0.84 ERA, was selected to be one of the relief pitchers. On July 14, St. Louis hosted the All-Star Game for the first time in 43 years. The AL beat the NL 4–3. Albert Pujols was 0-for-3 with an error that led to an AL run, Yadier Molina had an RBI single, and Ryan Franklin pitched a scoreless inning.

After appearing in only three games for St. Louis, new addition Mark DeRosa went onto the disabled list (retroactive to July 1) on July 7, suffering from a strained wrist. However, the rest of the Cardinals, buoyed by Pujols, a hot Colby Rasmus, and a resurgent Ryan Ludwick, went 6–4 on their ten-game road trip before the break, and entered the All-Star break with a 49–42 record and a 2.5 game lead in the NL Central.

The middle of July saw major changes to the Cardinals lineup. On July 18, Mark DeRosa, suffering from a torn tendon sheath in his wrist that eventually required offseason surgery, was reactivated from the DL and returned to the starting lineup. Four days later, Chris Duncan, one of the few remaining players from the 2006 world champion Cardinals, was traded to the Boston Red Sox for shortstop Julio Lugo, along with a player-to-be-named-later or cash; and the team recalled Brian Barden. Two days after that, on July 24, the Cardinals traded three prospects, including their #1 prospect, third baseman Brett Wallace, pitcher Clayton Mortensen, and outfielder Shane Peterson, for Oakland Athletics outfielder Matt Holliday.

On July 28, Todd Wellemeyer was demoted to the bullpen. Mitchell Boggs was called up from AAA-Memphis to take his July 31 start. At the time of the move, Wellemeyer's 5.79 ERA was second-worst in the National League among players with enough innings to qualify for the ERA title.

Buoyed by the arrival of Holliday and Lugo plus the return of DeRosa to the lineup and a hot Rick Ankiel, the Cardinals won six of their last nine games in July, and went 16-11 for the month. They ended July 1/2 game ahead of the Cubs in the NL Central. Ryan Ludwick earned honors as the National League Player of the Month for July, after batting .340 with 6 HR's and a league-high 28 RBI. The Cardinals have had the NL's top player three of the first four months with Albert Pujols winning the award in both April and June.

=== August ===
Albert Pujols tied the all-time NL season record set by Ernie Banks in 1955 by hitting his fifth grand slam of the year, (and his second HR of the game) on August 4 at New York. Pujols' slam was the exclamation point in a 12–7, 10-inning victory, in which Pujols went 4-for-5 with five RBIs and three runs scored. The Cardinals previously forced extra innings by rallying for two runs in the ninth off Mets' ace closer Francisco Rodríguez.

After briefly returning to the starting rotation, Todd Wellemeyer went on the DL with elbow inflammation. Mitchell Boggs was again tabbed to take his place in the rotation. Later in the month, starting pitcher Kyle Lohse joined him on the DL with a strained groin.

The team came to terms and signed their #1 draft pick, pitcher Shelby Miller, on August 17, just hours before the deadline.

John Smoltz signed with the team on August 19 as a probable fifth starter and also possible reliever after the Red Sox released him. In his first start, against San Diego, Smoltz threw five scoreless innings, striking out nine, and got the win.

The Cardinals played some of their best baseball of the season in the middle of August. Consecutive series victories against Pittsburgh, Cincinnati, San Diego, and Los Angeles, plus a win in the first game of another series with San Diego, pushed St. Louis to 17 games over .500 at 70–53, the furthest over .500 the franchise had reached since the 2005 team went 100–62. St. Louis opened up a six-game lead over the second-place Cubs during this stretch.

A 7–0 victory from Chris Carpenter, giving him an NL-tying 14th win, over San Diego at Petco Park on August 22, was the unofficial 10,000th win in franchise history. The official total (9,219) is lower because the Cardinals franchise does not count its ten years in the American Association in its all-time statistics.

On August 28, Albert Pujols hit his eighth career walk-off home run in John Smoltz's first home game at Busch Stadium in a 3–2 win over Washington.

A sweep of the Nationals ended one of the best Augusts in franchise history. The Cardinals went 20-6 for the month, pushing their overall record to 22 games over .500 at 77–55, and opening up a ten-game lead over the Cubs. They did not lose a series all month. Albert Pujols had a 1.092 OPS for the month while Matt Holliday, whose acquisition at the end of July coincided with the sudden takeoff of the Cardinals, posted a .963 OPS for August. Aces Adam Wainwright and Chris Carpenter had ERAs of 1.30 and 2.20 for August. Closer Ryan Franklin did not allow a run all month. Wainwright's 2–1 win over the Nationals on August 30 made him MLB's first 16-game winner. Carpenter was named the NL's Pitcher of the Month for August.

=== September/October ===
Third baseman Troy Glaus, out all year with a shoulder injury, became the first September call-up after maximum roster size expanded to 40. Adam Wainwright was touched for six runs in five innings by the Pirates but still earned his league-leading 17th victory on September 4. Albert Pujols hit only his second career pinch-hit home run in the 10th for a dramatic 2–1 game-winner over the Pirates, at PNC Park, September 5.

Chris Carpenter threw a one-hitter on September 7 against the Brewers at Miller Park, striking out 10, earning his first shutout since September 11, 2006, and reaching 1,300 career strikeouts.

A three-game sweep by the Braves September 11–13 marked the first time St. Louis had lost a series since July 24–26 against Philadelphia, and the first time the Cardinals lost the opening game of a series since July 20 against Houston.

After the Memphis Redbirds' season ended with a loss in the AAA National Championship Game, the Cardinals announced four more September call-ups: David Freese, Tyler Greene, Josh Kinney, and Matt Pagnozzi. Pagnozzi, nephew to former Cardinals All-Star catcher Tom Pagnozzi, first appeared in a game on September 29, becoming the tenth player to make his big-league debut with the 2009 Cardinals. The other nine rookies were Freese, Greene, P. J. Walters, Shane Robinson, Jarrett Hoffpauir, Colby Rasmus, Blake Hawksworth, Clayton Mortensen, and Jess Todd.

The Cardinals finally clinched the NL Central championship at Colorado (September 26), with their 90th win, 6–3, on a tie-breaking home run by replacement catcher Jason LaRue in the 7th inning. Ryan Ludwick later added a pinch-hit 2-run home run in the 9th inning. Adam Wainwright got his NL-leading 19th win, going 8 innings with 130 pitches, giving up 10 hits, walking one, and striking out 11. It was the Cardinals' seventh NL division championship in the last ten seasons, and eighth for manager Tony La Russa in 14 seasons as Cardinal manager, although one championship was a shared one with Houston in 2001.

On October 1, Chris Carpenter threw five shutout innings in a 13–0 victory over Cincinnati. Carpenter finished his season with a 17–4 record. He lowered his ERA to 2.24, securing his first ERA title and the first ERA title for any Cardinal since Joe Magrane was National League ERA champion in 1988. Carpenter also hit the first home run of his big league career, a grand slam, and drove in six runs to double his career RBI total.

In that same game Carpenter pitched (Oct 1, 2009), Tony La Russa passed John McGraw for second-most games managed in baseball with his 4,770th game managed (2,552-2,214-4). La Russa gets three more games (October 4) to extend his managed games to 4,773 (2,552-2,217-4) by the end of the 2009 season.

The next night, a bullpen collapse robbed Adam Wainwright of his chance to be the only 20-game winner in baseball, but Wainwright still finished as the National League leader in wins, with a 19–8 record and a 2.63 ERA.

The Cardinals finished the 2009 season losing 8 of their last 10 and 14 of their last 21 to go 91-71 for the year. Albert Pujols won his first home run title with 47, despite not homering after September 9. He also broke the all-time single-season record for assists by a first baseman with his record 185th in the last game.

On October 5, Chris Carpenter was named NL Comeback Player of the Year (second time) for his superb season, after leading the NL with a 2.24 ERA and an .810 winning percentage (17-4).

== Postseason ==
=== Division Series ===
In the 2009 National League Division Series, St. Louis faced off against the Los Angeles Dodgers, NL West champions. The Cardinals went 5–2 against the Dodgers in the regular season, and were the favorites in the National League, but the Dodgers swept the Cardinals in three games to bring St. Louis' 2009 season to a quick end. It was only the second time in eight trips to the postseason that a LaRussa-led Cardinals team lost in the first round.

== Awards and honors ==
All-Star Game

- Yadier Molina, Catcher, Starter
- Albert Pujols, First Base, Starter
- Ryan Franklin, Pitcher, Reserve

Adam Wainwright and Yadier Molina won Gold Gloves, the first for Wainwright and second for Molina. Albert Pujols won the Silver Slugger Award as the best hitting first baseman in the NL, and the Hank Aaron Award as the best hitter in the National League. In a close race, Wainwright finished third in voting (90 pts.) for the Cy Young Award despite getting the most first place votes (12). Chris Carpenter finished second (94 pts.), six points behind winner Tim Lincecum. Albert Pujols won his second consecutive Most Valuable Player award, winning all 32 first place votes.

== Season standings ==
NL Central
Team	W	L	Pct.	GB	Home	Road
St. Louis Cardinals	91	71	.562	—	46‍–‍35	45‍–‍36
Chicago Cubs	83	78	.516	7½	46‍–‍34	37‍–‍44
Milwaukee Brewers	80	82	.494	11	40‍–‍41	40‍–‍41
Cincinnati Reds	78	84	.481	13	40‍–‍41	38‍–‍43
Houston Astros	74	88	.457	17	44‍–‍37	30‍–‍51
Pittsburgh Pirates	62	99	.385	28½	40‍–‍41	22‍–‍58

== Game log ==
Regular Season Schedule (calendar style)
Regular Season Schedule (sortable text)
Downloadable Schedule for Microsoft Outlook, Palm (PDA)
National Broadcast Schedule
All game times are in Central Time Zone.

Legend
Cardinals WIN	Cardinals LOSS	Game POSTPONED

2009 Game Log
APRIL (16–7)

#	Date	Opponent	Score	Win	Loss	Save	Attendance	Record
1	April 6	Pirates	6–4	Grabow (1–0)	Motte (0–1)	Capps (1)	45,832	0–1
2	April 7	Pirates	9–3	Lohse (1–0)	Snell (0–1)		35,206	1–1
3	April 8	Pirates	7–4	Duke (1–0)	Wellemeyer (0–1)	Capps (2)	35,535	1–2
4	April 9	Pirates	2–1	Carpenter (1–0)	Ohlendorf (0–1)	Reyes (1)	35,293	2–2
5	April 10	Astros	5–3	Piñeiro (1–0)	Hampton (0–1)	McClellan (1)	37,224	3–2
6	April 11	Astros	11–2	Wainwright (1–0)	Oswalt (0–2)		43,454	4–2
7	April 12	Astros	3–0	Lohse (2–0)	Rodríguez (0–1)		36,310	5–2
8	April 13	@ Diamondbacks	2–1	Wellemeyer (1–1)	Davis (0–2)	Franklin (1)	25,014	6–2
9	April 14	@ Diamondbacks	7–6 (10)	Peña (2–0)	Thompson (0–1)		25,678	6–3
10	April 15	@ Diamondbacks	12–7	Piñeiro (2–0)	Garland (1–1)		21,298	7–3
11	April 16	@ Cubs	7–4	Wainwright (2–0)	Patton (0–1)	Franklin (2)	38,909	8–3
12	April 17	@ Cubs	8–7	Heilman (2–0)	Pérez (0–1)	Mármol (2)	40,250	8–4
13	April 18	@ Cubs	7–5 (11)	Guzmán (1–0)	Reyes (0–1)		40,878	8–5
	April 19	@ Cubs	Postponed					
14	April 21	Mets	6–4	Motte (1–1)	Putz (1–1)	Franklin (3)	35,506	9–5
15	April 22	Mets	5–2	Piñeiro (3–0)	Maine (0–2)	Franklin (4)	35,622	10–5
16	April 23	Mets	12–8	Lohse (3–0)	Hernández (1–1)		38,522	11–5
17	April 24	Cubs	4–3	McClellan (1–0)	Mármol (0–1)	Franklin (5)	45,812	12–5
18	April 25	Cubs	8–2	Boggs (1–0)	Marshall (0–1)		46,707	13–5
19	April 26	Cubs	10–3	Harden (2–1)	Wellemeyer (1–2)		44,742	13–6
20	April 27	@ Braves	3–2	Piñeiro (4–0)	Jurrjens (2–2)	Franklin (6)	16,739	14–6
21	April 28	@ Braves	2–1	Moylan (1–1)	McClellan (1–1)	González (3)	18,121	14–7
22	April 29	@ Braves	5–3	Wainwright (3–0)	Vázquez (2–2)	Franklin (7)	19,127	15–7
23	April 30	@ Nationals	9–4	Pérez (1–1)	Tavárez (0–2)		18,007	16–7

MAY (13–14)

#	Date	Opponent	Score	Win	Loss	Save	Attendance	Record
24	May 1	@ Nationals	6–2	Wellemeyer (2–2)	Zimmermann (2–1)		20,697	17–7
25	May 2	@ Nationals	6–1	Martis (3–0)	Piñeiro (4–1)		19,950	17–8
	May 3	@ Nationals	Postponed					
26	May 4	Phillies	6–1	Blanton (1–2)	Lohse (3–1)		35,990	17–9
27	May 5	Phillies	10–7	Myers (2–2)	Wainwright (3–1)		36,754	17–10
28	May 6	Pirates	4–2	McClellan (2–1)	Duke (3–3)	Franklin (8)	36,188	18–10
29	May 7	Pirates	5–2	Wellemeyer (3–2)	Ohlendorf (3–3)	Franklin (9)	41,928	19–10
30	May 8	@ Reds	6–4	Cueto (3–1)	Piñeiro (4–2)	Cordero (9)	18,016	19–11
31	May 9	@ Reds	8–3	Harang (3–3)	Lohse (3–2)		40,651	19–12
32	May 10	@ Reds	8–7 (10)	Franklin (1–0)	Cordero (0–2)	Pérez (1)	27,664	20–12
33	May 12	@ Pirates	7–1	Duke (4–3)	Wellemeyer (3–3)		11,718	20–13
34	May 13	@ Pirates	5–2	Ohlendorf (4–3)	Piñeiro (4–3)	Capps (6)	10,494	20–14
35	May 14	@ Pirates	5–1	Miller (1–0)	Karstens (1–2)		12,347	21–14
	May 15	Brewers	Postponed					
36	May 16	Brewers	1–0	Suppan (3–3)	Wainwright (3–2)	Hoffman (9)	43,382	21–15
37	May 17	Brewers	8–2	Parra (3–4)	Wellemeyer (3–4)		43,042	21–16
38	May 18	Brewers	8–4	Looper (4–2)	Lohse (3–3)		39,136	21–17
39	May 19	Cubs	3–0	Piñeiro (5–3)	Lilly (5–3)		41,374	22–17
40	May 20	Cubs	2–1	Carpenter (2–0)	Dempster (3–3)	Franklin (10)	41,703	23–17
41	May 21	Cubs	3–1	Wainwright (4–2)	Marshall (2–3)	Franklin (11)	44,235	24–17
42	May 22	Royals	5–0	Wellemeyer (4–4)	Davies (2–3)		43,429	25–17
43	May 23	Royals	5–0	Lohse (4–3)	Hochevar (0–2)		43,829	26–17
44	May 24	Royals	3–2	Bannister (4–1)	Piñeiro (5–4)	Cruz (2)	44,213	26–18
45	May 25	@ Brewers	1–0 (10)	Villanueva (2–3)	McClellan (2–2)		43,032	26–19
46	May 26	@ Brewers	8–1	Wainwright (5–2)	Suppan (3–4)		37,404	27–19
47	May 27	@ Brewers	3–2	Wellemeyer (5–4)	Parra (3–6)	Franklin (12)	40,226	28–19
48	May 29	@ Giants	4–2	Cain (6–1)	Piñeiro (5–5)	Wilson (11)	35,266	28–20
49	May 30	@ Giants	6–2	Carpenter (3–0)	Zito (1–6)		35,592	29–20
50	May 31	@ Giants	5–3	Valdéz (2–0)	Wainwright (5–3)	Wilson (12)	41,440	29–21

JUNE (12–17)

#	Date	Opponent / Time	Score	Win	Loss	Save	Attendance	Record
51	June 1	Reds	5–3	Lincoln (1–0)	Wellemeyer (5–5)	Cordero (14)	35,815	29–22
52	June 2	Reds	5–2	Motte (2–1)	Arroyo (7–4)	Franklin (13)	35,507	30–22
53	June 3	Reds	9–3	Cueto (5–3)	Lohse (4–4)		35,811	30–23
54	June 4	Reds	3–1	Carpenter (4–0)	Harang (5–6)		39,249	31–23
55	June 5	Rockies	11–4	de la Rosa (1–6)	Wainwright (5–4)		41,115	31–24
56	June 6	Rockies	10–1	Cook (4–3)	Wellemeyer (5–6)		44,002	31–25
57	June 7	Rockies	7–2	Jiménez (4–6)	Piñeiro (5–6)		42,288	31–26
58	June 8	Rockies	5–2	Marquis (8–4)	Thompson (0–2)	Street (9)	36,748	31–27
59	June 9	@ Marlins	4–3	Lindstrom (2–1)	Motte (2–2)		13,103	31–28
60	June 10	@ Marlins	13–4	Wainwright (6–4)	Volstad (4–6)		14,624	32–28
61	June 11	@ Marlins	6–5	Miller (2–0)	Núñez (2–3)	Franklin (14)	19,112	33–28
62	June 12	@ Indians	7–3	Huff (2–2)	Piñeiro (5–7)		28,159	33–29
63	June 13	@ Indians	3–1	Thompson (1–2)	Ohka (0–1)	Franklin (15)	31,754	34–29
64	June 14	@ Indians	3–0	Lee (4–6)	Carpenter (4–1)		23,644	34–30
65	June 16	Tigers	11–2	Wainwright (7–4)	Verlander (7–3)		44,021	35–30
66	June 17	Tigers	4–3	Wellemeyer (6–6)	Jackson (6–4)	Franklin (16)	39,699	36–30
67	June 18	Tigers	6–3	Porcello (8-4)	Piñeiro (5-8)	Rodney (13)	41,323	36-31
68	June 19	@ Royals	10–5	Thompson (2-2)	Davies (3-7)		37,660	37-31
69	June 20	@ Royals (Fox)	7–1	Carpenter (5-1)	Bannister (5-4)	Franklin (17)	38,769	38-31
70	June 21	@ Royals	12–5	Wainwright (8-4)	Meche (4-6)		33,805	39-31
71	June 22	@ Mets	6–4	Redding (1-2)	Wellemeyer (6-7)	Rodríguez (19)	38,488	39-32
72	June 23	@ Mets	3–0	Piñeiro (6-8)	Hernández (5-2)		38,903	40-32
73	June 24	@ Mets	11–0	Nieve (3-0)	Thompson (2-3)		39,689	40-33
74	June 25	@ Mets	3–2	Santana (9-5)	Carpenter (5-2)	Rodríguez (20)	41,221	40-34
75	June 26	Twins	3–1	Perkins (3-4)	Wainwright (8-5)	Nathan (18)	44,159	40-35
76	June 27	Twins	5–3	Kinney (1-0)	Slowey (10-3)	Franklin (18)	42,986	41-35
77	June 28	Twins	6–2	Liriano (4-8)	Piñeiro (6-9)	Nathan (19)	42,705	41-36
78	June 29	Giants	10–0	Lincecum (8-2)	Thompson (2-4)		37,737	41-37
79	June 30	Giants	6–3	Johnson (8-5)	Carpenter (5-3)	Wilson (21)	37,174	41-38

JULY (16-11)

#	Date	Opponent / Time	Score	Win	Loss	Save	Attendance	Record
80	July 1	Giants	2–1 (10)	Franklin (2-0)	Howry (0-4)		36,928	42-38
81	July 2	Giants	5–2	Wellemeyer (7-7)	Zito (4-8)	Franklin (19)	41,875	43-38
82	July 3	@ Reds	7–4	Motte (3-2)	Herrera (1-4)	Franklin (20)	41,349	44-38
83	July 4	@ Reds	5–2	Owings (6-8)	Thompson (2-5)	Cordero (20)	37,371	44-39
84	July 5	@ Reds	10–1	Carpenter (6-3)	Arroyo (8-8)		24,017	45-39
85	July 7	@ Brewers	5–0	Wainwright (9-5)	Gallardo (8-6)		36,557	46-39
86	July 8	@ Brewers	5–4	Coffey (4-1)	Motte (3-3)	Hoffman (19)	33,655	46-40
87	July 9	@ Brewers	5–1	Piñeiro (7-9)	Villanueva (2-5)		40,357	47-40
88	July 10	@ Cubs	8–3	Carpenter (7-3)	Harden (5-6)		40,687	48-40
89	July 11	@ Cubs (Fox)	5–2	Lilly (9-6)	Thompson (2-6)		41,210	48-41
90	July 12	@ Cubs	7–3	Zambrano (5-4)	Lohse (4-5)		40,701	48-42
91	July 12	@ Cubs (ESPN Sunday Night Baseball)	4–2	Wainwright (10-5)	Wells (4-4)	Franklin (21)	41,244	49-42
--	July 14	All-Star Game 7:00pm (Fox)	American League 4, National League 3 (St. Louis, Missouri Busch Stadium)					
92	July 17	Diamondbacks	6–1	Carpenter (8-3)	Garland (5-9)		44,781	50-42
93	July 18	Diamondbacks	4–2	Haren (10-5)	Wainwright (10-6)	Qualls (17)	45,267	50-43
94	July 19	Diamondbacks	2–1	Piñeiro (8-9)	Petit (0-4)	Franklin (22)	41,759	51-43
95	July 20	@ Astros	3–2	Moehler (7-5)	Lohse (4-6)	Valverde (10)	36,437	51-44
96	July 21	@ Astros	11–6	Rodríguez (10-6)	Wellemeyer (7-8)		33,140	51-45
97	July 22	@ Astros	4–3	Valverde (1-2)	Franklin (2-1)		37,619	51-46
98	July 23	@ Nationals	4–1 (6)	Wainwright (11-6)	Balester (0-1)		25,359	52-46
99	July 24	@ Phillies	8–1	Piñeiro (9-9)	Happ (7-1)		45,166	53-46
100	July 25	@ Phillies (Fox)	14–6	Lopez (3-0)	Motte (3-4)		45,182	53-47
101	July 26	@ Phillies (TBS)	9–2	Blanton (7-4)	Wellemeyer (7-9)		45,271	53-48
102	July 27	Dodgers (ESPN)	6–1	Carpenter (9-3)	Wolf (5-5)	Franklin (23)	43,756	54-48
103	July 28	Dodgers	10–0	Wainwright (12-6)	Billingsley (10-6)		40,105	55-48
104	July 29	Dodgers	3–2 (15)	Hawksworth (1-0)	Weaver (5-4)		40,011	56-48
105	July 30	Dodgers	5–3 (10)	McDonald (3-2)	Reyes (0-2)	Broxton (24)	43,263	56-49
106	July 31	Astros	4–3	Miller (3-0)	Arias (2-1)	Franklin (24)	43,760	57-49

AUGUST (20-6)

#	Date	Opponent / Time	Score	Win	Loss	Save	Attendance	Record
107	August 1	Astros	3–1	Carpenter (10-3)	Fulchino (4-4)		45,074	58-49
108	August 2	Astros	2–0	Norris (1-0)	Wainwright (12-7)	Valverde (12)	45,227	58-50
109	August 4	@ Mets	12–7 (10)	McClellan (3-2)	Feliciano (4-4)		40,354	59-50
110	August 5	@ Mets	9–0	Figueroa (1-2)	Lohse (4-7)	Parnell (1)	39,781	59-51
111	August 7	@ Pirates	6–4	Carpenter (11-3)	Ascanio (0-2)	Franklin (25)	24,854	60-51
112	August 8	@ Pirates	5–3	Wainwright (13-7)	Morton (2-5)	Franklin (26)	38,593	61-51
113	August 9	@ Pirates	7–3	Piñeiro (10-9)	Capps (2-7)	McClellan (2)	24,369	62-51
114	August 10	Reds	4–1	Lohse (5-7)	Wells (0-3)	Franklin (27)	40,212	63-51
115	August 11	Reds	5–4	Lehr (2-0)	Boggs (1-1)	Cordero (25)	40,145	63-52
116	August 12	Reds	5–2	Carpenter (12-3)	Bailey (2-4)	Franklin (28)	40,328	64-52
117	August 14	Padres	9–2	Wainwright (14-7)	Latos (4-2)		42,208	65-52
118	August 15	Padres	7–4	Piñeiro (11-9)	Stauffer (1-5)	Franklin (29)	44,292	66-52
119	August 16	Padres	7–5	Miller (4-0)	Bell (4-2)		40,812	67-52
120	August 17	@ Dodgers	3–2	Carpenter (13-3)	Haeger (0-1)	Franklin (30)	49,415	68-52
121	August 18	@ Dodgers	7–3	Billingsley (12-6)	Boggs (1-2)	Broxton (26)	49,052	68-53
122	August 19	@ Dodgers	3–2	McClellan (4-2)	Broxton (7-1)	Franklin (31)	54,847	69-53
123	August 20	@ Padres	5–1	Piñeiro (12-9)	Stauffer (1-6)		19,867	70-53
124	August 21	@ Padres	4–0	Richard (7-3)	Lohse (5-8)		27,282	70-54
125	August 22	@ Padres	7–0	Carpenter (14-3)	Correia (8-10)		38,156	71-54
126	August 23	@ Padres	5–2	Smoltz (3-5) [1st GS, 1-0]	Carrillo (1-2)	Franklin (32)	27,435	72-54
127	August 25	Astros	1–0	Wainwright (15-7)	Rodríguez (12-8)	Franklin (33)	40,512	73-54
128	August 26	Astros	3–2	Piñeiro (13-9)	Oswalt (7-5)	Franklin (34)	40,311	74-54
129	August 27	Astros	4–3	Valverde (2-2)	McClellan (4-3)		40,348	74-55
130	August 28	Nationals	3–2	Motte (4-4)	Bergmann (2-4)		40,033	75-55
131	August 29	Nationals	9–4	Boggs (2-2)	Stammen (4-7)		44,028	76-55
132	August 30	Nationals	2–1	Wainwright (16-7)	Mock (3-6)	Franklin (35)	41,083	77-55

SEPTEMBER (13-13)

#	Date	Opponent / Time	Score	Win	Loss	Save	Attendance	Record
133	September 1	Brewers	7–6	Piñeiro (14-9)	Weathers (3-5)	Franklin (36)	40,119	78-55
134	September 2	Brewers	10–3	Carpenter (15-3)	Bush (3-6)		40,214	79-55
135	September 3	Brewers	4–3	Parra (10-10)	Smoltz (3-6)	Hoffman (30)	37,791	79-56
136	September 4	@ Pirates	14–7	Wainwright (17-7)	Hart (4-5)		15,258	80-56
137	September 5	@ Pirates	2–1 (10)	Hawksworth (2-0)	Capps (3-8)	Franklin (37)	27,071	81-56
138	September 6	@ Pirates	6–5	Chavez (1-4)	Franklin (2-2)		19,274	81-57
139	September 7	@ Brewers	3–0	Carpenter (16-3)	Bush (3-7)		35,360	82-57
140	September 8	@ Brewers	4–3	Hawksworth (3-0)	Hoffman (1-2)	McClellan (3)	36,172	83-57
141	September 9	@ Brewers	5–1	Wainwright (18-7)	Suppan (6-9)		26,559	84-57
142	September 11	Braves	1–0	Jurrjens (11-10)	Piñeiro (14-10)	Soriano (23)	43,984	84-58
143	September 12	Braves (Fox)	7–6	Gonzalez (4-4)	Franklin (2-3)	Soriano (24)	43,869	84-59
144	September 13	Braves	9–2	Vázquez (13-9)	Carpenter (16-4)		41,179	84-60
145	September 14	Marlins	11–6	Hawksworth (4-0)	Nolasco (11-9)		43,582	85-60
146	September 15	Marlins	2–1	West (7-5)	Wainwright (18-8)	Núñez (21)	42,895	85-61
147	September 16	Marlins	5–2	Johnson (15-4)	Piñeiro (14-11)	Núñez (22)	43,020	85-62
148	September 18	Cubs	3–2	Franklin (3-3)	Heilman (3-4)		45,959	86-62
149	September 19	Cubs (Fox)	2–1	Franklin (4-3)	Mármol (2-4)		46,506	87-62
150	September 20	Cubs (ESPN)	6–3 (11)	Caridad (1-0)	Boggs (2-3)	Mármol (14)	44,937	87-63
151	September 21	@ Astros	7–3	Lohse (6-8)	Rodríguez (13-11)		34,705	88-63
152	September 22	@ Astros	11–2	Piñeiro (15-11)	Bazardo (0-2)		32,644	89-63
153	September 23	@ Astros	3–0	Norris (6-3)	Smoltz (3-7)	Valverde (24)	38,732	89-64
154	September 25	@ Rockies	2–1	Street (4-1)	Miller (4-1)		48,847	89-65
155	September 26	@ Rockies	6–3	Wainwright (19-8)	Jiménez (14-12)	Franklin (38)	47,741	90-65
156	September 27	@ Rockies	4–3	de la Rosa (16-9)	Lohse (6-9)	Street (34)	42,032	90-66
157	September 29	@ Reds	7–2	Bailey (7-5)	Piñeiro (15-12)		12,026	90-67
158	September 30	@ Reds	6–1	Arroyo (15-13)	Smoltz (3-8)		11,930	90-68

OCTOBER (1-3)

#	Date	Opponent / Time	Score	Win	Loss	Save	Attendance	Record
159	October 1	@ Reds	13–0	Carpenter (17-4)	Wells (2-5)		11,861	91-68
160	October 2	Brewers	12–6	Looper (14-7)	McClellan (4-4)		44,331	91-69
161	October 3	Brewers	5–4	Villanueva (4-10)	Lohse (6-10)	Hoffman (37)	43,977	91-70
162	October 4	Brewers	9–7 (10)	Hoffman (3-2)	Wellemeyer (7-10)	Axford (1)	43,464	91-71

=== Record vs. opponents ===
2009 National League record Source: MLB Standings Grid – 2009
Team	AZ	ATL	CHC	CIN	COL	FLA	HOU	LAD	MIL	NYM	PHI	PIT	SD	SF	STL	WAS	AL
Arizona	–	3–4	4-2	1–5	7-11	5–3	5–4	7-11	2–5	5–2	1–5	6–1	11-7	5-13	2–4	1–5	5–10
Atlanta	4–3	–	4–2	3–6	4–4	8-10	3-3	4–3	3–3	13–5	10-8	3–4	3–3	3–4	4–2	10-8	7–8
Chicago	2-4	2–4	–	10-5	2–4	4–3	11–6	3–5	10-7	3-3	1–5	10-4	4–5	4-2	6-10	5–2	6–9
Cincinnati	5-1	6-3	5-10	–	0-7	3-3	12-4	1-5	8-7	2-4	2-5	13-5	1-6	3-3	8-8	3-4	6-9
Colorado	11-7	4-4	4-2	7-0	–	2-4	2-5	4-14	6-0	3-4	2-4	6-3	10-8	8-10	6-1	6-0	11-4
Florida	3-5	10-8	3-4	3-3	4-2	–	4–3	3-3	3-4	11-7	9-9	2-4	4-2	3-4	3-3	12-6	10-8
Houston	4–5	3-3	6-11	4-12	5-2	3-4	–	4–3	5-10	1-5	6-2	10-5	6-1	2-4	6-9	3-3	6-9
Los Angeles	11-7	3-4	5-3	5-1	14-4	3-3	3-4	–	3–3	5-1	4-3	4-3	10-8	11-7	2-5	3-2	9-9
Milwaukee	5-2	3-3	7-10	7-8	0-6	4-3	10-5	3-3	–	3-3	4-3	9-5	2-4	4-5	9-9	5-3	5-10
New York	2-5	5-13	3-3	4-2	4-3	7-11	5-1	1-5	3-3	–	6-12	4-3	2-5	5-3	4-5	10-8	5–10
Philadelphia	5-1	8-10	5-1	5-2	4-2	9-9	2-6	3-4	3-4	12-6	–	4-2	5-2	3-4	4-1	15-3	6-12
Pittsburgh	1-6	4-3	4-10	5-13	3-6	4-2	5-10	3-4	5-9	3-4	2-4	–	3-4	2-4	5-10	5-3	8–7
San Diego	7-11	3-3	5-4	6-1	8-10	2-4	1-6	8-10	4-2	5-2	2-5	4-3	–	10-8	1-6	4-2	5–10
San Francisco	13-5	4–3	2–4	3–3	10-8	4–3	4–2	7-11	5-4	3–5	4–3	4–2	8-10	–	4–3	4–2	9–6
St. Louis	4-2	2-4	10-6	8-8	1-6	3-3	9-6	5-2	9-9	5-4	1-4	10-5	6-1	3-4	–	6–1	9–6
Washington	5-1	8-10	2-5	4-3	0-6	6-12	3-3	2-3	3-5	8-10	3-15	3-5	2-4	2-4	1-6	–	7–11

=== Roster ===
2009 St. Louis Cardinals
Roster
Pitchers: 41 Mitchell Boggs; 54 Blaine Boyer; 29 Chris Carpenter; 31 Ryan Franklin; 53 Blake Hawksworth; 52 Josh Kinney; 26 Kyle Lohse; 46 Kyle McClellan; 43 Trever Miller; 54 Clay Mortensen; 60 Jason Motte; 34 Chris Perez; 35 Joel Piñeiro; 36 Dennys Reyes; 30 John Smoltz; 48 Brad Thompson; 30 Jess Todd; 50 Adam Wainwright; 62 P. J. Walters; 37 Todd Wellemeyer	Catchers: 21 Jason LaRue; 4 Yadier Molina; 19 Matt Pagnozzi; Infielders: 23 Brian Barden; 7 Mark DeRosa; 12,23 David Freese; 8 Troy Glaus; 3 Khalil Greene; 27 Tyler Greene; 34 Jarrett Hoffpauir; 12 Julio Lugo; 5 Albert Pujols; 13 Brendan Ryan; 55 Skip Schumaker; 22 Joe Thurston	Outfielders: 24 Rick Ankiel; 16 Chris Duncan; 15 Matt Holliday; 47 Ryan Ludwick; 28 Colby Rasmus; 33 Shane Robinson; 19 Nick Stavinoha	Manager: 10 Tony La Russa; Coaches: 18 Dave Duncan (pitching); 38 Marty Mason (bullpen); 39 Dave McKay (first base); 16 Hal McRae (hitting); 11 José Oquendo (third base); 49 Joe Pettini (bench)

== Player stats ==
=== Batting ===
Note: G = Games played; AB = At bats; R = Runs; H = Hits; 2B= Doubles; 3B = Triples; HR = Home runs; RBI = Runs batted in; BB = Walks; Avg. = Batting average; OBP = On-base percentage; SLG = Slugging percentage

(through October 4)

2009 St. Louis Cardinals batting stats at Baseball Reference

2009 St. Louis Cardinals hitting stats at Baseball Almanac

Player	G	AB	R	H	2B	3B	HR	RBI	BB	SO	Avg.	OBP	SLG
Albert Pujols	160	568	**124**	186	45	1	**47**	135	115	64	.327	**.443**	**.658**
Skip Schumaker	153	532	85	161	34	1	4	35	52	69	.303	.364	.393
Ryan Ludwick	139	486	63	129	20	1	22	97	41	106	.265	.329	.447
Yadier Molina	140	481	45	141	23	1	6	54	50	39	.293	.366	.383
Colby Rasmus	147	474	72	119	22	2	16	52	36	95	.251	.307	.407
Brendan Ryan	129	390	55	114	19	7	3	37	24	56	.292	.340	.400
Rick Ankiel	122	372	50	86	21	2	11	38	26	99	.231	.285	.387
Joe Thurston	124	267	27	60	17	4	1	25	33	56	.225	.316	.330
Chris Duncan ^ (4/6-7/21)	87	260	25	59	15	2	5	32	41	67	.227	.329	.358
Mark DeRosa ^ (6/28-10/4)	68	237	31	54	10	1	10	28	18	58	.228	.291	.405
Matt Holliday ^ (7/24-10/4)	63	235	42	83	16	2	13	55	26	43	.353	.419	.604
Khalil Greene	77	170	21	34	7	0	6	24	15	35	.200	.272	.347
Julio Lugo ^ (7/24-10/4)	51	148	24	41	9	4	2	13	17	27	.277	.351	.432
Tyler Greene	48	108	9	24	5	0	2	7	4	32	.222	.270	.327
Jason LaRue	51	104	10	25	3	0	2	6	3	22	.240	.288	.298
Brian Barden	52	103	13	24	3	0	4	10	6	21	.233	.286	.379
Adam Wainwright	39	89	7	16	5	1	2	4	1	26	.180	.189	.326
Nick Stavinoha	39	87	6	20	7	0	2	17	2	15	.230	.242	.379
Joel Piñeiro	32	66	4	9	2	0	0	4	4	33	.136	.186	.167
Chris Carpenter	26	63	3	11	3	0	1	7	2	13	.175	.212	.270
Todd Wellemeyer	30	39	1	5	0	0	0	0	0	16	.128	.128	.128
Kyle Lohse	23	37	3	8	0	0	0	2	1	7	.216	.275	.216
David Freese	17	31	3	10	2	0	1	7	2	7	.323	.353	.484
Troy Glaus	14	29	2	5	2	0	0	2	3	8	.172	.250	.241
Shane Robinson	11	25	1	6	1	0	0	1	0	2	.240	.231	.280
Mitchell Boggs	16	14	1	1	1	0	0	0	0	6	.071	.071	.143
John Smoltz	7	13	1	1	0	0	0	0	1	5	.077	.143	.077
Jarrett Hoffpauir	8	12	1	3	2	0	0	2	4	2	.250	.438	.417
Brad Thompson	31	12	0	1	0	0	0	0	0	7	.083	.083	.083
P.J. Walters	8	3	0	0	0	0	0	0	0	1	.000	.000	.000
Kyle McClellan	64	3	0	0	0	0	0	0	0	1	.000	.000	.000
Josh Kinney	17	1	0	0	0	0	0	0	0	1	.000	.000	.000
Jason Motte	66	1	0	0	0	0	0	0	0	1	.000	.000	.000
Clay Mortensen	1	1	0	0	0	0	0	0	0	0	.000	.000	.000
Blaine Boyer	15	1	0	0	0	0	0	0	0	1	.000	.000	.000
**TOTALS**	**162**	**5,465**	**730**	**1,436**	**294**	**29**	**160**	**694**	**528**	**1,041**	**.263**	**.332**	**.415**

G AB R H 2B 3B HR RBI BB SO Avg. OBP SLG -->

Note: Pitchers batting stats included (at least one at-bat).

^ Traded to or away from Cardinals dates

BOLD = Leading NL

=== Pitchers ===
Note: G = Games pitched; GS = Games started; SV = Saves; IP = Innings pitched; W = Wins; L = Losses; ERA = Earned run average; H = Hits allowed; HR = Home runs allowed; BB = Walks allowed, SO = Strikeouts; WHIP = (Walks + Hits) per innings pitched; HBP = Hit by pitch; BF = Batters faced

(FINAL through October 4)

2009 St. Louis Cardinals pitching stats at Baseball Reference

2009 St.Louis Cardinals pitching stats at Baseball Almanac

Player	G	GS	SV	IP	W	L	ERA	H	HR	BB	SO	WHIP	HBP	BF
Adam Wainwright	34	**34**	0	**233.0**	**19**	8	2.63	216	17	66	212	1.210	3	**970**
Joel Piñeiro	32	32	0	214.0	15	12	3.49	218	11	27	105	1.145	8	865
Chris Carpenter	28	28	0	192.2	17	4	**2.24**	156	7	38	144	1.007	7	750
Todd Wellemeyer	28	21	0	122.1	7	10	5.89	160	19	57	78	1.774	3	561
Kyle Lohse	23	22	0	117.2	6	10	4.74	125	16	36	77	1.368	3	512
Brad Thompson	32	8	0	80.0	2	6	4.84	85	8	23	34	1.350	7	345
Kyle McClellan	66	0	3	66.2	4	4	3.38	56	4	34	51	1.350	2	288
Ryan Franklin	62	0	38	61.0	4	3	1.92	49	2	24	44	1.147	1	250
Mitchell Boggs	16	9	0	58.0	2	3	4.19	71	3	33	46	1.793	4	268
Jason Motte	69	0	0	56.2	4	4	4.76	57	10	23	54	1.412	2	244
Trever Miller	70	0	0	43.2	4	1	2.06	31	5	11	46	0.962	2	173
Dennys Reyes	75	0	1	41.0	0	2	3.29	35	2	21	33	1.366	3	180
Blake Hawksworth	30	0	0	40.0	4	0	2.03	29	2	15	20	1.100	1	160
John Smoltz	7	7	0	38.0	1	3	4.26	36	3	9	40	1.184	0	158
Chris Perez	29	0	1	23.2	1	1	4.18	17	3	15	30	1.352	3	106
Blaine Boyer	15	0	0	16.1	0	0	4.41	14	1	5	9	1.163	1	70
P. J. Walters	8	1	0	16.0	0	0	9.56	21	6	9	14	1.875	0	80
Josh Kinney	17	0	0	15.1	1	0	8.80	23	2	11	8	2.217	2	81
Clayton Mortensen	1	0	0	3.0	0	0	6.00	5	1	1	2	2.000	1	16
Jess Todd	1	0	0	1.2	0	0	10.80	3	1	2	2	3.000	0	10
**TOTALS**	**162**	**162**	**43**	**1,440.2**	**91**	**71**	**3.66**	**1,407**	**123**	**460**	**1,049**	**1.296**	**53**	**6,087** G GS SV IP W L ERA H HR BB SO WHIP HBP BF -->

Bold = leading NL

=== Relief pitchers ===
(FINAL through October 4)

22–17, 3.61 ERA, 1.32 WHIP, 432.0 IP, 379 H, 193 R, 173 ER, 42 HR, 191 BB, 335 SO

(FINAL through October 4)

Saves / Opp: 43/58 (74%) 1st Batter / Retired: 338/474 (71%)
Holds: 86 Inherited Runners / Scored: 56/242 (23%) 22-17, 3.61 ERA, 1.32 WHIP, 432.0 IP, 379 H, 193 R, 173 ER, 42 HR, 191 BB, 335 SO

Saves / Opp: 43/58 (74%) 1st Batter / Retired: 338/474 (71%)
Holds: 86 Inherited Runners / Scored: 56/242 (23%)
-->

Blown Saves by bullpen: 17 Franklin (5), McClellan (4), Perez (1), Kinney (1), Miller (2), Motte (4)
Games lost by bullpen: 16

== Scoring by inning ==
(FINAL through October 4)

INNING	1	2	3	4	5	6	7	8	9	10	11	12	13	14	15	TOTAL
CARDINALS	97	43	82	95	92	92	80	87	52	8	1	0	0	0	1	730
OPPONENTS	92	62	58	68	78	81	88	62	39	6	6	0	0	0	0	640

== Cardinals Record When ==
(FINAL through October 4)

Home 46-35
Away 45-36

Scoring first 71-25
Opp. scores first 20-46

Scoring more than 3 runs 66-19
Scoring 3 runs 17-17
Scoring fewer than 3 runs 8-35

Leading after 7 innings 72-5
Tied after 7 innings 9-7
Trailing after 7 innings 9-59

Leading after 8 innings 79-3
Tied after 8 innings 7-9
Trailing after 8 innings 4-59

Blown Saves by bullpen: 17 (Franklin (5), McClellan (4), (Perez [1], Kinney [1], (Miller [2], Motte [4])
Games lost by bullpen: 16

In errorless games 56-33
Extra innings 5-6
Shutouts 11-10

One-run games 24-21

Out-hit opponents 62-12
Same hits as opponents 13-5
Out-hit by opponents 16-54

Runs via HR 249
Opp. Runs via HR 213

By Day

Mon. 8-9
Tue. 14-11
Wed. 15-10
Thu. 14-5
Fri. 15-10
Sat. 15-11
Sun. 10-15

By Opponent
DIVISION
HOME ROAD TOTAL

NL Central 24-16 22-18 46-34
NL East 7-7 10-9 17-16
NL West 10-8 9-7 19-15
AL Central 5-4 4-2 9-6

TOTALS 46-35 45-36 91-71
(Interleague 9-6)

== Busch Stadium (Indexes) ==
(FINAL through October 4)

2009 (100 = Neutral Park, > 100 Ballpark favors, < 100 Ballpark inhibits
81 HOME G; Cardinals: 2,654 AB; Opponents: 2,790 AB)
81 AWAY G: Cardinals: 2,811 AB; Opponents: 2,670 AB)

R 92 H 98 HR 74

(Cardinals batting: HOME .263 ROAD .263 OVERALL .263)
(Opponents batting: at StL .254 on ROAD .261 OVERALL .258)

2007–2009 Index (3-yr. composite)

HOME 243 G; Cardinals: 8,089 AB; Opponents: 8,503 AB)

BA 100 R 93 H 99 2B 93 3B 90 HR 80 BB 99 SO 95 E 107 E-inf. 108 LHB-BA 101 LHB-HR 82 RHB-BA 99 RHB-HR 78

== Draft picks ==
St. Louis' picks at the 2009 Major League Baseball draft at MLB Network Studios, New York City on June 9 – 11, 2009.

For the entire draft, the Cardinals selection breakdown was as follows: 29 pitchers (21-RHP, 8-LHP), 11 infielders, six catchers and four outfielders. The Cardinals second-round pick, Robert Stock out of USC, will begin his pro career as a catcher and that is reflected in these numbers. St. Louis selected 43 college players and seven high school prospects.

bold = agreed to terms

Round	#	Player	Position	Class, Bats/Throws, Ht/Wt., birthdate (birthplace)	College
1	19	**Shelby Miller**	P	Senior (HS), R/R, 6' 3" / 195 lb., Oct 10, 1990 (Brownwood, Texas)	Brownwood High School (TX)
2	67	**Robert Stock**	C	Junior, L/R, 6' 1" / 195 lb., Nov 21, 1989 (Westlake Village, California)	USC
3	98	**Joseph Kelly**	RP	Junior, R/R, 6' 1" / 170 lb., Jun 9, 1988 (Corona, California)	University of California-Riverside
4	129	**Joseph Bittle**	P	5S, R/R, 6' 2" / 190 lb., Aug 27, 1986 (Texarkana, Texas)	University of Mississippi
5	159	**Ryan Jackson**	SS	Junior, R/R, 6' 2" / 175 lb., May 10, 1988 (Miami Springs, Florida)	University of Miami
6	189	**Virgil Hill**	CF	J2, R/R, 6' 0" / 185 lb., September 9, 1989 (Valencia, California)	Los Angeles Mission College
7	219	**Kyle Conley**	RF	Senior, R/R, 6' 4" / 215 lb., May 7, 1987 (Richland, Washington)	University of Washington
8	249	**Jason Stidham**	SS	Junior, L/R, 5' 11" / 170 lb., Feb 26, 1988 (Palm Bay, Florida)	Florida State University
9	279	**Nick McCully**	P	Junior, R/R, 5' 10" / 195 lb., September 5, 1988 (Lakeland, Florida)	Coastal Carolina University
10	309	**Héctor Hernández**	P	Senior (HS), S/L, 6' 1" / 198 lb., Feb 20, 1991 (Carolina, Puerto Rico)	Puerto Rico Baseball Academy and High School
11	339	**Alan Ahmady**	1b	Junior, R/R, 5' 11" / 195 lb., Dec 14, 1987 (Fresno, California)	Fresno State University
12	369	**Pat Daugherty**	P	J2, L/L, 6' 5" / 215 lb., Aug 30, 1988 (Bailey, Mississippi)	Pearl River Community College
13	399	**Matt Carpenter**	3b	Senior, L/R, 6' 3" / 200 lb., Nov 26, 1985 (Sugar Land, Texas)	Texas Christian University
14	429	**Ross Smith**	CF	J3, R/R, 6' 2" / 200 lb., Oct 6, 1987 (Eastman, Georgia)	Middle Georgia College
15	459	**David Washington**	1b	Senior (HS), L/L, 6' 5" / 200 lb., Nov 20, 1990 (University City, California)	University City High School (San Diego, California)
16	489	Daniel Bibona	P	Junior, L/L, 5' 11" / 165 lb., Jun 19, 1988 (Lake Forest, California)	University of California-Irvine
17	519	**Jonathan Rodriguez**	1b	J2, R/R, 6' 2" / ? lbs., Aug 21, 1989 (San Juan, Puerto Rico)	Manatee Community College (FL)
18	549	**Anthony Garcia**	C	Senior (HS), R/R, 6' 0" / 180 lb., Jan 4, 1992 (Carolina, Puerto Rico)	San Juan Educational School (PR)
19	579	**Travis Tartamella**	C	Junior, R/R, 6' 0" / 205 lb., Dec 17, 1987 (Alta Loma, California)	California State University, Los Angeles
20	609	**Scott Schneider**	P	Junior, R/R, 6' 0" / 175 lb., Jun 7, 1988 (Fallbrook, California)	St. Mary's College (xx)

== Farm system ==
Level	Team	League	Manager
AAA	Memphis Redbirds	Pacific Coast League	Chris Maloney
AA	Springfield Cardinals	Texas League	Ron Warner
A	Palm Beach Cardinals	Florida State League	Tom Spencer
A	Quad Cities River Bandits	Midwest League	Steve Dillard
A-Short Season	Batavia Muckdogs	New York–Penn League	Mark DeJohn
Rookie	Johnson City Cardinals	Appalachian League	Mike Shildt
Rookie	GCL Cardinals	Gulf Coast League	Steve Turco

LEAGUE CHAMPIONS: Memphis

=== Draft selections ===
St. Louis Cardinals 2009 Draft Selections
