= P. J. Walters =

American baseball player (born 1985)

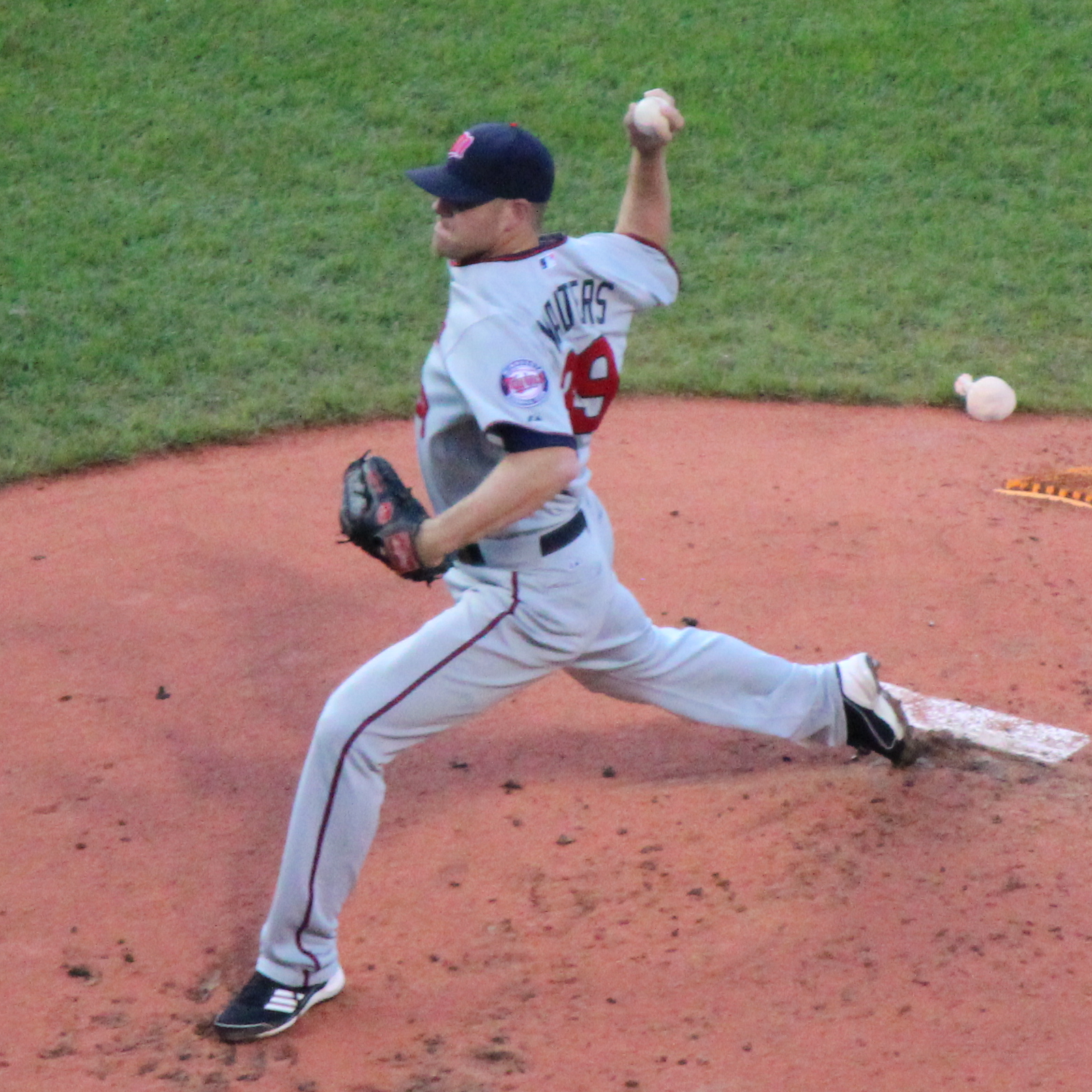
- Walters with the Minnesota Twins
- Pitcher
- Born: March 12, 1985 (age 41); Dothan, Alabama, U.S.
- Batted: Right Threw: Right

MLB debut
- April 17, 2009, for the St. Louis Cardinals

Last MLB appearance
- July 3, 2013, for the Minnesota Twins

MLB statistics
- Win–loss record: 6–10
- Earned run average: 6.28
- Strikeouts: 104
- Stats at Baseball Reference

Teams
- St. Louis Cardinals (2009–2011); Toronto Blue Jays (2011); Minnesota Twins (2012–2013)

Phillip DeWayne "P. J." Walters (born March 12, 1985) is an American former professional baseball pitcher. He played in Major League Baseball (MLB) for the St. Louis Cardinals, Toronto Blue Jays, and Minnesota Twins.

== Career ==
=== High School and college ===
Walters played at Faith Academy in Mobile, Alabama where he had an overall record of 36–1 and set school records in several categories including career wins and single season strikeouts and ERA. He next attended the University of South Alabama. After the 2005 season, he played collegiate summer baseball with the Brewster Whitecaps of the Cape Cod Baseball League and was named a league all-star. As a Senior he had an 11–3 record, 3.20 ERA and 166 strikeouts. He became the Sun Belt Conference career leader in strikeouts and was selected as Conference co-pitcher of the year and Baseball America third team All-American.

=== St. Louis Cardinals ===
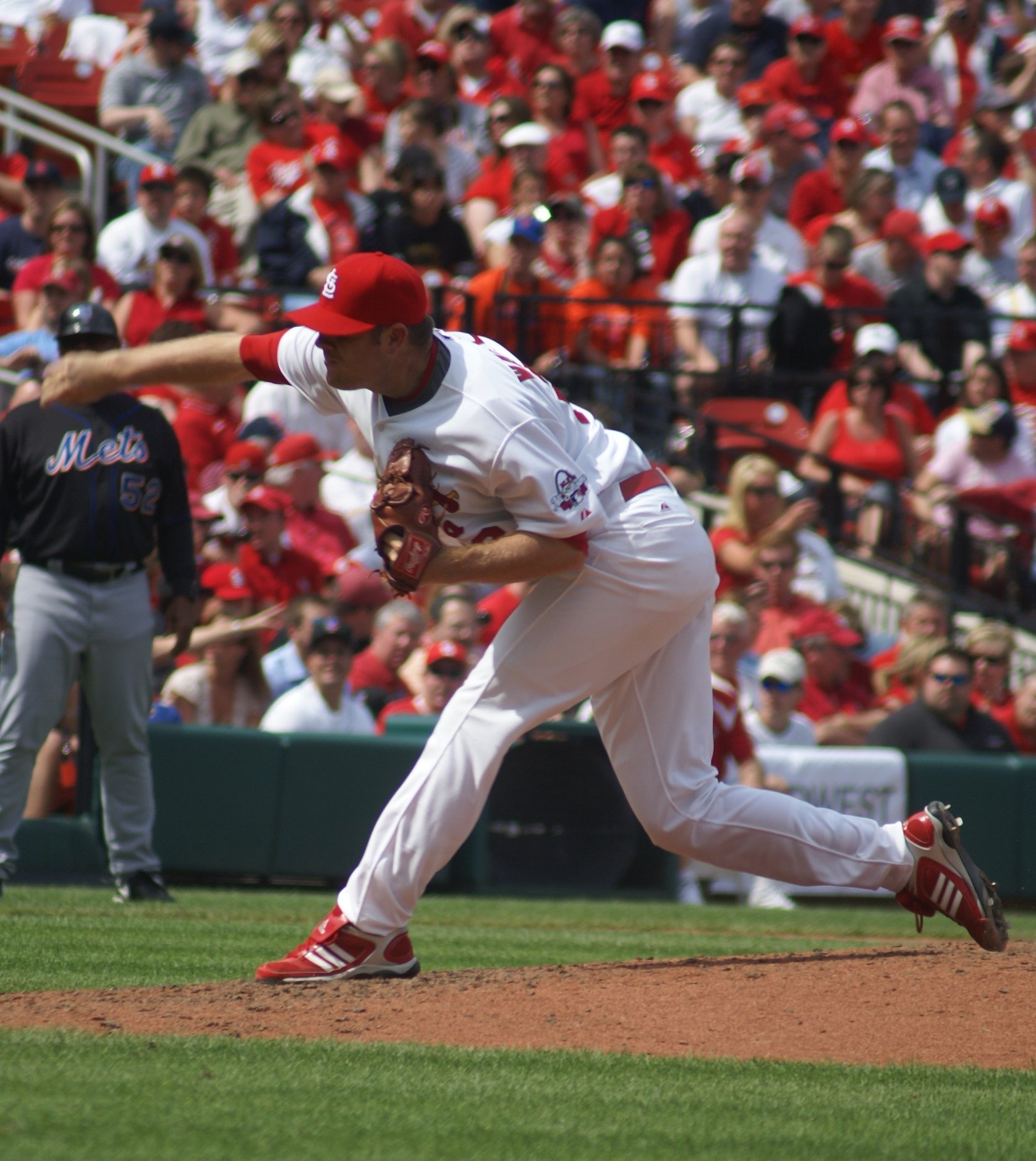
Walters pitching for the St. Louis Cardinals in 2009

Walters was drafted by the St. Louis Cardinals in the 11th round of the 2006 player draft (346th overall). He climbed three levels in 2007 and earned the Cardinals minor league pitcher of the year honors. He then spent most of 2008 in Triple-A Memphis. He went 9-4 for the Cardinals' top affiliate, with a 4.87 ERA over 122 innings.

Walters made his major league debut on April 17, 2009, as the starting pitcher against the Chicago Cubs. He had been called up when Chris Carpenter was placed on the 15-day disabled list. He became the first Cardinals rookie to make his first major-league start at Wrigley Field in nearly three decades. Walters pitched 4.0 innings, leading 4-3 in the game before being replaced, pitching against veteran Carlos Zambrano, giving up 6 hits (one hit was a double), 3 runs (all earned), walked 2, struck out 7, with a 6.75 ERA. He faced 19 batters, threw 98 pitches (59 for strikes), with 4 groundouts and 1 fly out. He picked up his first MLB win on May 27, 2010 when he pitched five scoreless innings against the San Diego Padres.

On July 25, 2011, Walters gave up a grand slam to Houston Astros outfielder Carlos Lee. This made Walters and Lee the first pair of players in MLB history in which the batter (Lee) hit grand slams in each of his only two at-bats against the pitcher (Walters). (The previous one had been hit on July 21, 2009.) In parts of three seasons with the Cardinals, Walters was 2–0 with a 7.38 ERA in 19 appearances (four starts).

=== Toronto Blue Jays ===
On July 27, 2011, Walters was traded to the Toronto Blue Jays along with Colby Rasmus, Brian Tallet and Trever Miller for Edwin Jackson, Octavio Dotel, Marc Rzepczynski and Corey Patterson. He pitched one scoreless inning for the Blue Jays before being demoted to the minor leagues. In the remaining months of 2011, he went 1-3 with an 8.38 ERA in Triple-A for the Las Vegas 51s. After the 2011 season, he elected for free agency.

=== Minnesota Twins ===
On December 14, 2011, Walters signed a minor league contract with the Minnesota Twins. He began the season with the Triple-A Rochester Red Wings, where he was the opening day starter. He was called up by the Twins on May 9, 2012. On May 22, Walters threw his first career complete game against the Chicago White Sox in a 9-2 win. He was 2–5 with a 5.69 ERA in 12 starts for the Twins in 2012 and 3–3 with a 4.01 ERA in 14 starts for Rochester.

On October 29, Walters became a free agent after refusing his outright assignment to the minor leagues. However, on November 1, Walters signed a new minor league deal with the Twins that included an invitation to spring training.

The low light of his 2013 season was on June 22, when he didn't even make it out of the first inning while pitching against the Cleveland Indians. He walked five batters while only getting two batters out. He was designated for assignment on July 4. In eight starts for the Twins in 2013, he was 2–5 with a 5.95 ERA. He also started 19 games that year for Rochester and was 7–5 with a 4.18 ERA.

=== Kansas City Royals ===
Walters signed a minor league deal with the Kansas City Royals on November 19, 2013, and started the 2014 season with the Triple-A Omaha Storm Chasers. He appeared in 10 games for them, eight of which were starts and was 1–4 with a 7.97 ERA.

=== Toronto Blue Jays ===
Walters and Melky Mesa were dealt to the Toronto Blue Jays for cash considerations on May 26, 2014. Walters split the season between the Double-A New Hampshire Fisher Cats and the Triple-A Buffalo Bisons. He made eight starts for New Hampshire and was 2–3 with a 2.60 ERA and made nine starts for Buffalo and was 4–2 with a 4.56 ERA. He was released on September 14, 2014.

=== Philadelphia Phillies / Lancaster Barnstormers ===
Walters signed a minor league deal with the Philadelphia Phillies on November 12, 2014. He did not make the roster and was released on April 4. He then signed with the independent Lancaster Barnstormers of the Atlantic League of Professional Baseball. He made two starts for the Barnstormers, allowing seven runs in 10 2/3 innings.

=== Los Angeles Dodgers ===
Walters signed a minor league contract with the Los Angeles Dodgers on May 6, 2015. He started four games for the Triple-A Oklahoma City Dodgers and one for the Double-A Tulsa Drillers.

=== Washington Nationals ===
On June 1, 2015, Walters was traded to the Washington Nationals for cash considerations. He was released on April 11, 2016.

== Personal life ==
Walters was born March 12, 1985, in Dothan, Alabama. He and his wife, Brittney, had three children and reside in Loxley, Alabama.
