= Brian Tallet =

American baseball player (born 1977)

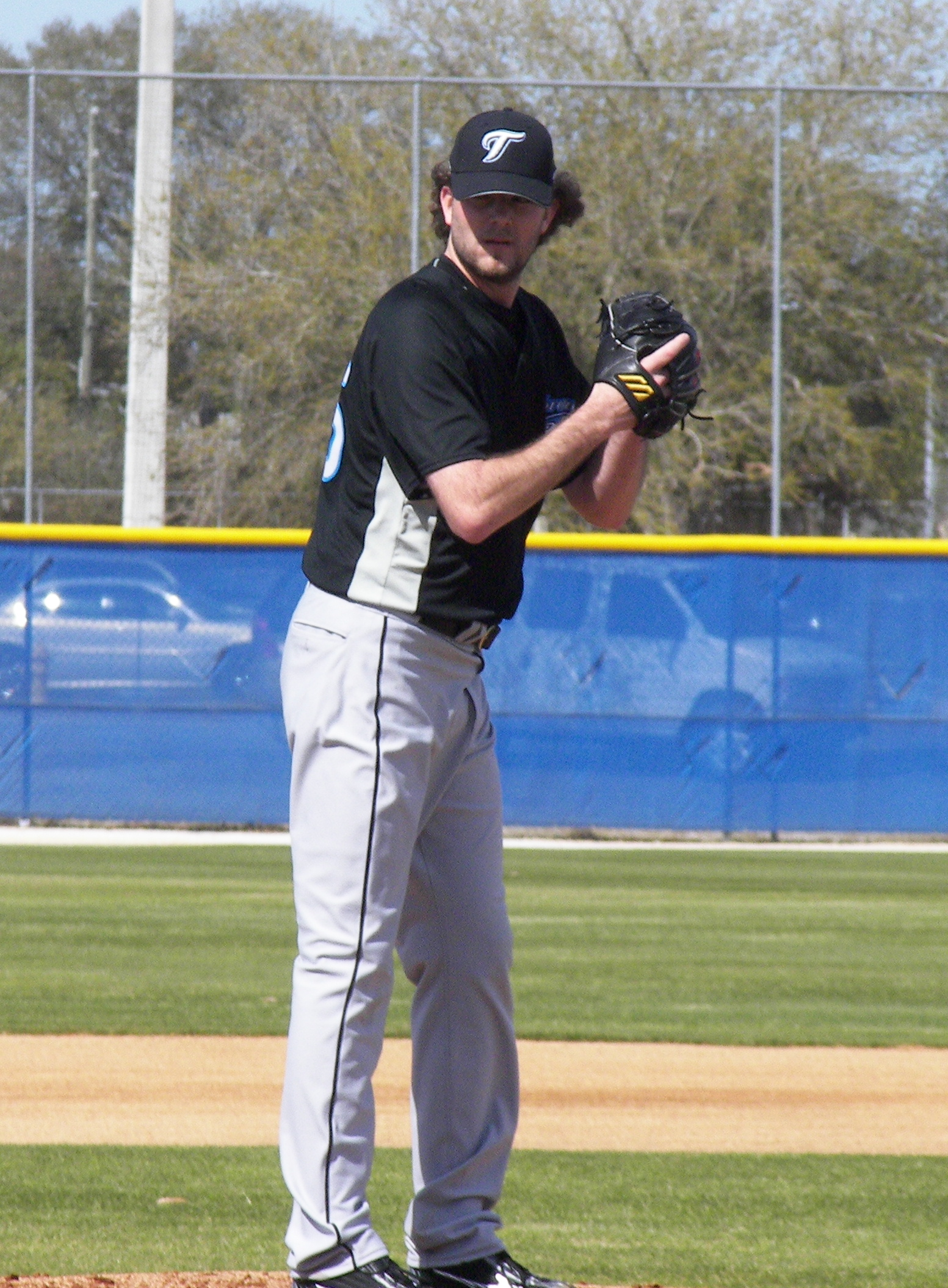
- Tallet with the Toronto Blue Jays
- Pitcher
- Born: September 21, 1977 (age 47); Midwest City, Oklahoma, U.S.
- Batted: Left Threw: Left

MLB debut
- September 16, 2002, for the Cleveland Indians

Last MLB appearance
- August 30, 2011, for the Toronto Blue Jays

MLB statistics
- Win–loss record: 16–25
- Earned run average: 4.79
- Strikeouts: 337
- Stats at Baseball Reference

Teams
- Cleveland Indians (2002–2003, 2005); Toronto Blue Jays (2006–2010); St. Louis Cardinals (2011); Toronto Blue Jays (2011)

Brian Curtis Tallet (born September 21, 1977) is an American former professional baseball pitcher. Tallet played the majority of his career for the Toronto Blue Jays. He also played for the St. Louis Cardinals and the Cleveland Indians. He is 6' 6" in height. He pitched for the LSU Tigers and won a national championship in 2000.

== Career ==
Tallet was drafted in the 1996, 1997, and 1999 drafts by the Marlins, Yankees, and Pirates, respectively, but did not sign with them. Instead, he attended Hill College and Louisiana State University. In 1997 and 1998, he played collegiate summer baseball with the Wareham Gatemen of the Cape Cod Baseball League.

Tallet did sign when drafted in the second round (55th overall) of the 2000 MLB draft by the Cleveland Indians. He made his major league debut on September 16, 2002, against the Boston Red Sox. He posted six shutout innings while allowing only four hits in Cleveland's 7–1 win. Tallet missed the 2004 season after having Tommy John surgery in August 2003.

=== Cleveland Indians ===
In his first two major league starts in 2002, Tallet had one win in 12 innings pitched with a 1.50 ERA. He also struck out five and walked four. For the 2003 season, Tallet posted an 0–2 record in five games (three starts) starts while allowing 20 earned runs with a 4.74 ERA in 19 innings pitched. Things did not get much better in 2005, as he compiled a 7.71 ERA in two games. During his career in Cleveland, he compiled a 1–2 record with a 4.09 ERA, while also striking out 16 and walking 15.

=== Toronto Blue Jays ===
On January 16, 2006, he was traded to the Toronto Blue Jays in exchange for Bubbie Buzachero.

In Tallet's first season with Toronto, he went 3–0 with a 3.81 ERA in 44 games (one start). Tallet made his first start of the season and in over three years on August 7, 2006, against the Baltimore Orioles. In the game, despite walking four batters in two innings, Tallet held the Orioles scoreless. He earned a no-decision in Toronto's 8–1 win.

In 2007, he had a 2–4 record with a 3.47 ERA in 48 games. In 2008, Tallet had a 1–2 record with a 2.88 ERA in 51 games.

In February 2009, the Jays avoided salary arbitration with Tallet, signing him to a one-year contract worth $1.015 million.

During the month of April, Tallet compiled a 1–1 record with a 6.45 ERA after taking over in the starting rotation for Jesse Litsch. After two close losses in which he was supported by only one run in each game, Tallet defeated the Boston Red Sox on May 30, who had kicked off a nine-game skid for the Jays starting from May 19 to May 27. In the game, he went seven strong innings while giving up three runs and striking out six. During the month of May, Tallet went 2–2 with a 4.26 ERA and in only one of those starts did he give up more than three runs.

On September 27, 2009, Tallet gave up Matt Tuiasosopo's first career home run, which was correctly predicted by Mike Blowers in detail. In 2009, Tallet pitched the most innings of his career due to his time in the starting rotation (160.2). In 37 games (25 starts), he went 7–9 with a 5.32 ERA while striking out 120 batters and walking 72.

On November 11, 2010, he refused an assignment to the minors and became a free agent.

=== St. Louis Cardinals ===
On November 30, 2010, Tallet signed a one-year, $750,000 contract with the St. Louis Cardinals.

In early July 2011, Tallet strained an intercostal muscle from a heavy sneeze. After doctors examined the CT scan on the muscle strain, they saw past the rib cage and discovered that he also had cysts clinging to his kidneys. He was subsequently diagnosed with polycystic kidney disease.

=== Toronto Blue Jays (second stint) ===
On July 27, 2011, he was traded back to the Toronto Blue Jays along with P. J. Walters, Colby Rasmus and Trever Miller for Edwin Jackson, Octavio Dotel, Marc Rzepczynski and Corey Patterson.

Tallet made four rehab appearances for the Class-A Dunedin Blue Jays after his acquisition, allowing one run in four innings. Following a 12–0 loss to the Tampa Bay Rays on August 28, Tallet was called up to the Blue Jays. Wil Ledezma was designated for assignment to make room for Tallet on the 40-man roster. Tallet made his return to the Blue Jays on August 30 coming in for the 10th inning in a save situation. He blew the save and took the loss, giving up two runs on two walks and two singles while recording only one out. The following day, Tallet was designated for assignment to free space for the return of Carlos Villanueva, who had been on the 15-day disabled list since August 4. He was released on September 2.

=== Pittsburgh & San Diego ===
On January 28, 2012, Tallet signed a minor league contract with the Pittsburgh Pirates and was traded on April 7, 2012, to the San Diego Padres. Tallet began the year with Triple-A Tucson. The Padres released Tallet on May 17, 2012.

=== Lancaster Barnstormers ===
On May 17, 2013, Tallet signed with the Lancaster Barnstormers of the Atlantic League of Professional Baseball. He became a free agent following the season. He appeared in 18 games 21.2 innings of relief going 0-1 with a 4.57 ERA and 18 strikeouts.
