= Marc Rzepczynski =

American baseball player (born 1985)

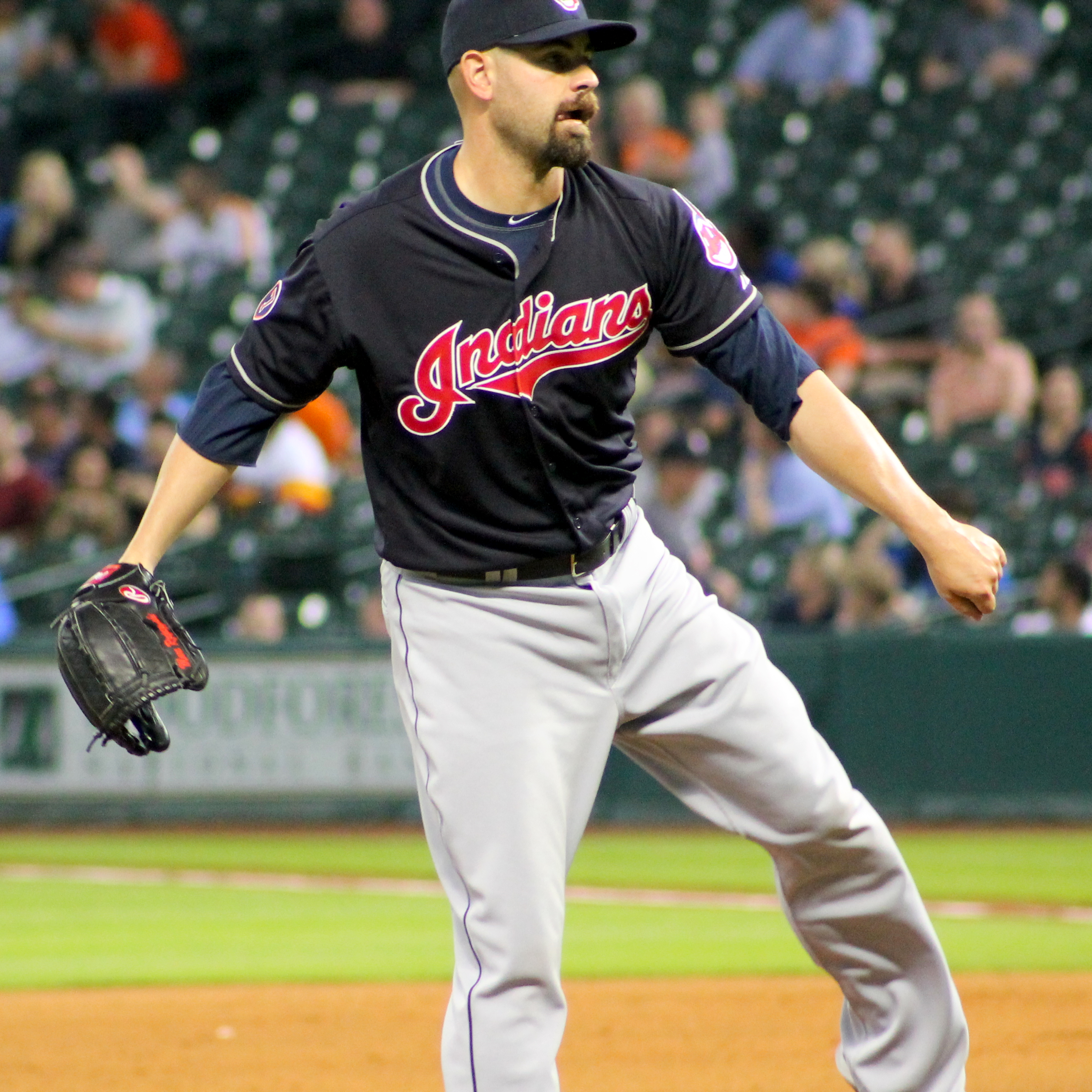
- Rzepczynski with the Indians in 2015
- Relief pitcher
- Born: August 29, 1985 (age 40); Oak Lawn, Illinois, U.S.
- Batted: Left Threw: Left

MLB debut
- July 7, 2009, for the Toronto Blue Jays

Last MLB appearance
- July 9, 2018, for the Cleveland Indians

MLB statistics
- Win–loss record: 14–27
- Earned run average: 3.89
- Strikeouts: 409
- Stats at Baseball Reference

Teams
- Toronto Blue Jays (2009–2011); St. Louis Cardinals (2011–2013); Cleveland Indians (2013–2015); San Diego Padres (2015); Oakland Athletics (2016); Washington Nationals (2016); Seattle Mariners (2017–2018); Cleveland Indians (2018)

Career highlights and awards
- World Series champion (2011)

Marc Walter Rzepczynski (/zəpˈtʃɪnski/ zəp-CHIN-skee; born August 29, 1985), nicknamed "Scrabble", is an American former professional baseball pitcher. He played in Major League Baseball (MLB) for the Toronto Blue Jays, St. Louis Cardinals, Cleveland Indians, San Diego Padres, Oakland Athletics, Washington Nationals, and Seattle Mariners.

== Amateur career ==
Rzepczynski attended Servite High School in Anaheim, California and the University of California, Riverside, where he played college baseball for the Highlanders from 2004–2007. In his senior season, the Highlanders won the Big West Conference championship and appeared in the NCAA tournament.

He also played for the Corvallis Knights and the Bellingham Bells (2004) in the West Coast League, an independent summer collegiate league.

== Professional career ==
=== Toronto Blue Jays ===
Rzepczynski was drafted in the fifth round (175th overall) of the 2007 Major League Baseball draft by the Toronto Blue Jays. He made his professional debut that season for the Low-A Auburn Doubledays of the New York–Penn League. With Auburn, he posted a 5–0 record and a 2.76 ERA in 11 games (7 starts), with 49 strikeouts and 17 walks in 45 2/3 innings pitched.

In 2008, Rzepczynski advanced to the Single-A Lansing Lugnuts of the Midwest League, where he finished 7–6 with a 2.83 ERA in 22 starts, with 124 strikeouts and 42 walks over 121 innings pitched.

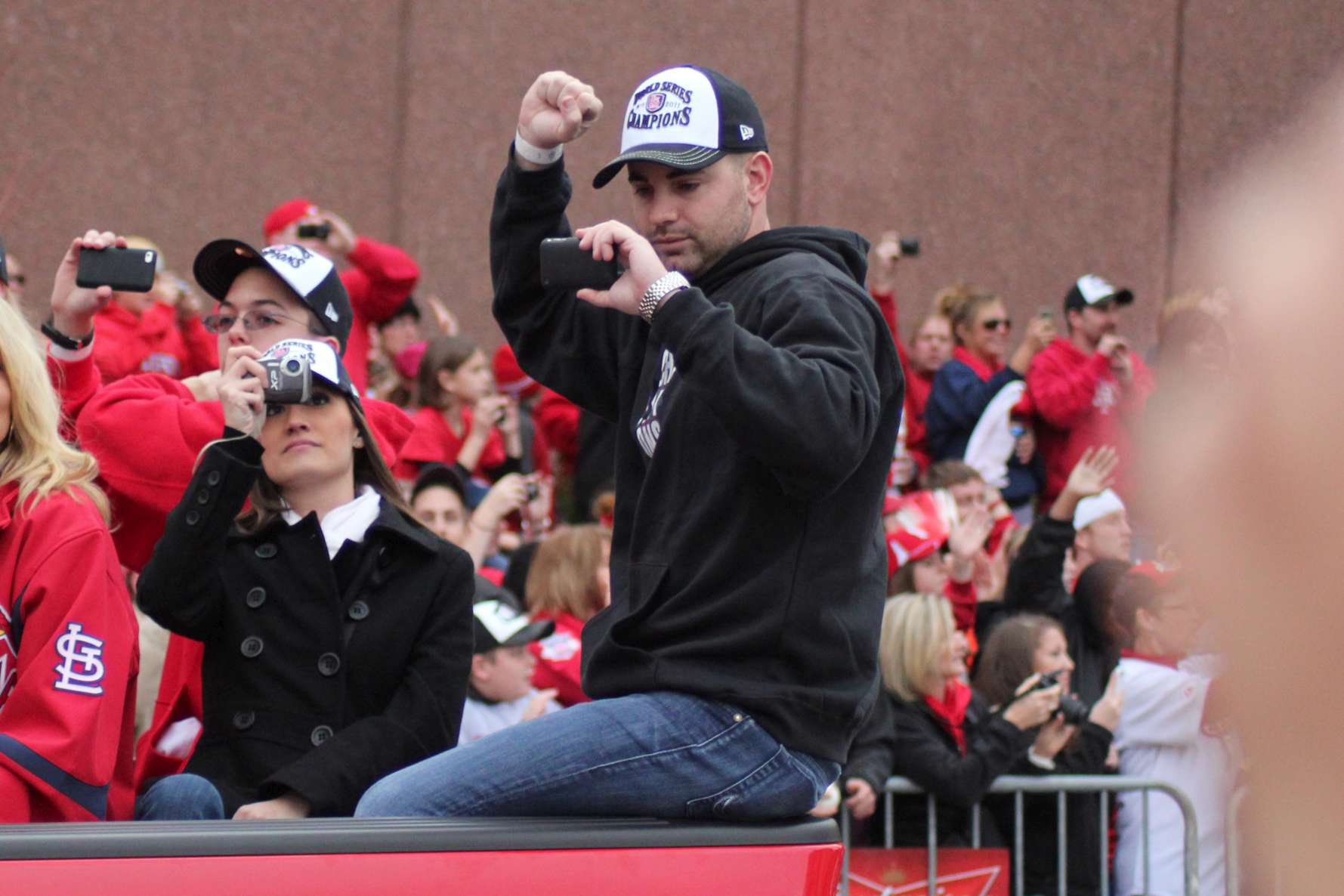
Rzepczynski during the 2011 World Series victory parade.

In 2009, Rzepczynski through early July had split his season between the New Hampshire Fisher Cats, Toronto's Double-A affiliate in the Eastern League, and the Las Vegas 51s, Toronto's Triple-A affiliate in the Pacific Coast League. His 2009 statistics between Double-A and Triple-A combined for 16 games (all starts), with a 9–5 record, a 2.66 ERA, 104 strikeouts, and 40 walks, in 88 innings pitched.

A series of injuries to pitchers at the major league level had plagued the parent Blue Jays for the first three months of the 2009 season, leading to opportunities for several rookies to advance to the top level. Scott Richmond, himself a rookie starter who had pitched very well for Toronto, became the latest casualty, when he went on the disabled list on July 4, retroactive to July 1, due to biceps tendinitis. Richmond, before play on July 6, ranked 16th of 40 eligible American League pitchers in Earned Run Average (ERA). Brett Cecil, another rookie who was already in the Jays' starting rotation, started on July 5 on short notice in Richmond's stead, against the New York Yankees, but this still left Toronto with only four healthy starters, leading to Rzepczynski's promotion and opportunity. Rzepczynski pitched six innings in his debut, during which he gave up 2 hits and 1 earned run, walked 4, and struck out 7 in a no-decision; the Jays lost, 3–1, in 11 innings. In his second big-league start, Rzepczynski again pitched well, but took the loss against the Baltimore Orioles on July 12, lasting 6 innings and allowing 3 earned runs; Toronto lost the game, 4–2. Rzepczynski won his first major-league game on July 18, defeating the American League leading Boston Red Sox; he pitched 6 innings, allowing 1 earned run on 4 hits, walking 4 and striking out 4; Toronto won, 6–2. Jays manager Cito Gaston stated before the game that Rzepczynski would remain in the rotation for at least the next couple of weeks, pending Richmond's return from the disabled list.

=== St. Louis Cardinals ===
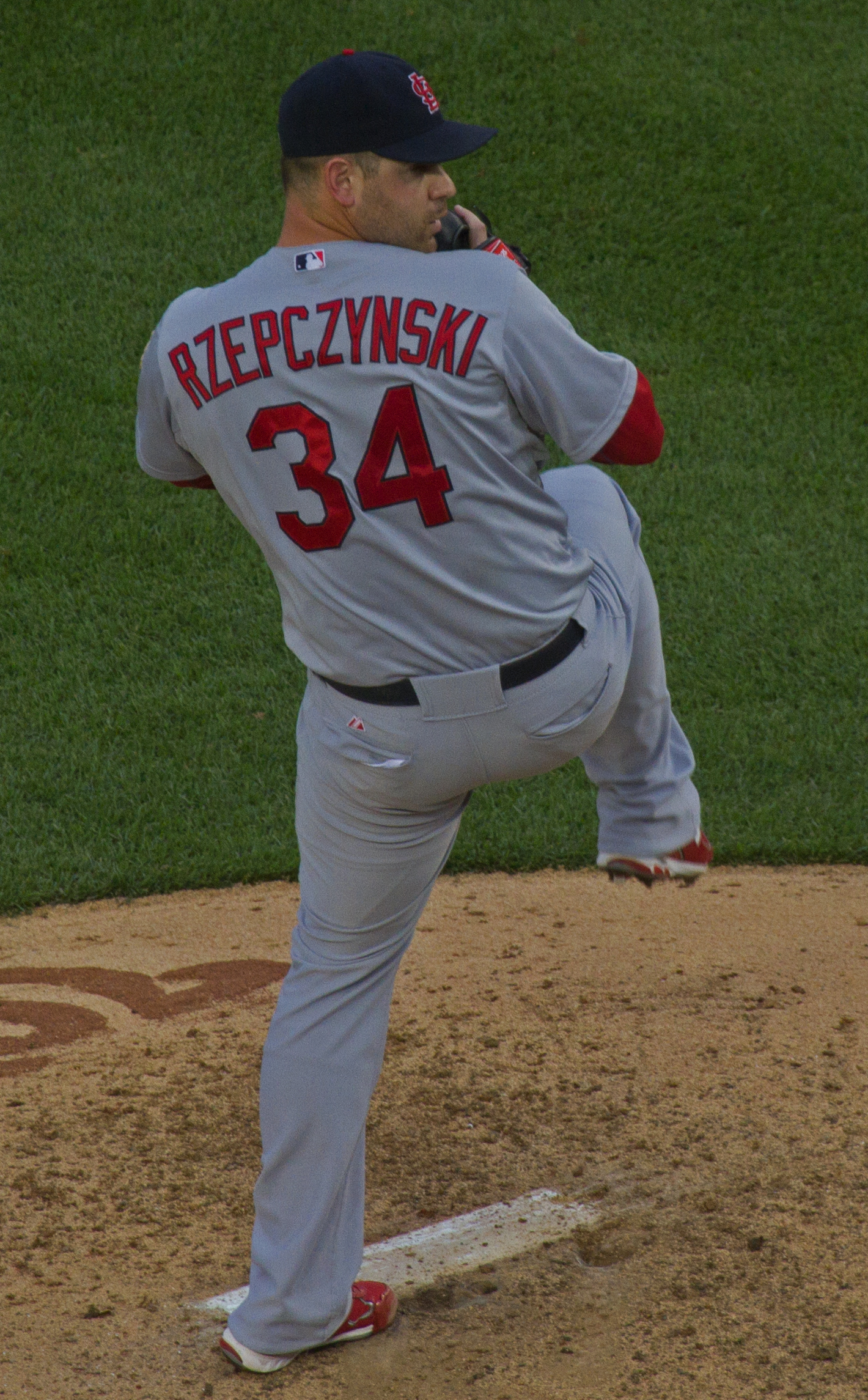
Rzepczynski in 2013

On July 27, 2011, Rzepczynski was traded to the St. Louis Cardinals along with Octavio Dotel, Edwin Jackson, and Corey Patterson in exchange for Colby Rasmus, P. J. Walters, Trever Miller, and Brian Tallet. He made 28 appearances on the year for St. Louis, posting an 0-3 record and 3.97 ERA with 28 strikeouts across 22 2/3 innings pitched. The Cardinals won the 2011 World Series; in the series, Rzepczynski faced a total of four batters in two games, striking out three and giving up a two-run double.

In 2012, Rzepczynski became a lefty specialist, pitching 46 2/3 innings despite appearing in 70 games for the Cardinals. He finished the year with a 1-3 record and 4.24 ERA with 33 strikeouts.

On April 29, 2013, Rzepczynski was optioned to the Triple-A Memphis Redbirds. On July 25, Rzepczynski was recalled by the Cardinals. In 11 games for St. Louis, he struggled to a 7.84 ERA with 9 strikeouts across 10 1/3 innings pitched.

=== Cleveland Indians ===
On July 30, 2013, Rzepczynski was traded to the Cleveland Indians in exchange for minor league second baseman Juan Herrera. He made 27 appearances for Cleveland down the stretch, recording an 0.89 ERA with 20 strikeouts across 20 1/3 innings pitched.

Rzepczynski made 73 appearances out of the bullpen for the Indians during the 2014 season, registering a 2.74 ERA with 46 strikeouts and one save over 46 innings of work. He appeared in 45 contests for Cleveland in 2015, compiling a 2-3 record and 4.43 ERA with 24 strikeouts across 20 1/3 innings pitched.

=== San Diego Padres ===
On July 31, 2015, Rzepczynski was traded to the San Diego Padres in exchange for Abraham Almonte. He made 27 appearances for San Diego down the stretch, struggling to an 0-1 record and 7.36 ERA with 17 strikeouts across 14 2/3 innings pitched.

=== Oakland Athletics ===
On December 2, 2015, the Padres traded Rzepczynski and Yonder Alonso to the Oakland Athletics in exchange for Drew Pomeranz, José Torres, and a player to be named later or cash considerations. He made 56 relief appearances for Oakland in 2016, logging a 3.00 ERA with 37 strikeouts over 36 innings of work.

=== Washington Nationals ===
On August 25, 2016, the Athletics traded Rzepczynski to the Washington Nationals in exchange for Max Schrock. In 14 appearances for Washington, he recorded a 1.54 ERA with 9 strikeouts across 11 2/3 innings pitched. On October 13, in the decisive game in the National League Division Series against the Los Angeles Dodgers, Rzepczynski was brought in to relieve Nationals pitcher Max Scherzer with the score tied 1-1. Rzepczynski walked the first batter he faced on four pitches, and became the losing pitcher in the 4-3 loss that eliminated the Nationals from the 2016 playoffs.

=== Seattle Mariners ===
On December 3, 2016, the Seattle Mariners signed Rzepczynski to a two-year contract worth $11 million. In his first season as a Mariner, he appeared in 64 games despite pitching a career low 31 1/3 innings; in those games, he posted a 2-2 record and 4.02 ERA with 25 strikeouts and one save.

Rzepczynski made 18 appearances for Seattle in 2018, but struggled to an 0-1 record and 9.39 ERA with 10 strikeouts across 7 2/3 innings pitched. He was designated for assignment by the Mariners on June 1, 2018. Rzepczynski was released by the organization after clearing waivers on June 6.

=== Cleveland Indians (second stint) ===
On June 18, 2018, Rzepczynski signed a minor league contract with the Cleveland Indians. He was subsequently assigned to the Triple-A Columbus Clippers. On July 1, the Indians selected Rzepczynski's contract, adding him to their active roster. He made five scoreless appearances for Cleveland, striking out one in 2 2/3 innings. On July 11, Rzepczynski was designated for assignment. After clearing waivers, Rzepczynski elected free agency.

=== Seattle Mariners (second stint) ===
On July 30, 2018, Rzepczynski signed a minor league contract with the Seattle Mariners. In 12 games for the Triple–A Tacoma Rainiers, he struggled to a 9.64 ERA with 10 strikeouts across 9 1/3 innings. Rzepczynski elected free agency following the season on November 2.

=== Arizona Diamondbacks ===
On February 8, 2019, Rzepczynski signed a minor league contract with the Arizona Diamondbacks that included an invitation to spring training. He was released by Arizona on May 31, but later re-signed with the team on another minor league contract on June 24. In 45 total appearances for the Triple-A Reno Aces, Rzepczynski posted a 2-4 record and 5.04 ERA with 36 strikeouts across 44 2/3 innings pitched. He was released by the Diamondbacks organization on August 25.

=== Toronto Blue Jays (second stint) ===
On February 24, 2020, Rzepczynski signed a minor league contract with the Toronto Blue Jays. Rzepczynski did not play in a game in 2020 due to the cancellation of the minor league season because of the COVID-19 pandemic. He was released by Toronto on July 27.

In May 2021, Rzepczynski was named to the roster of the United States national baseball team for the Americas Qualifying Event.

=== Lancaster Barnstormers ===
On March 16, 2022, Rzepczynski signed with the Lancaster Barnstormers of the Atlantic League of Professional Baseball. He made 7 appearances for the Barnstormers, posting a 2.84 ERA with 6 strikeouts in 6 1/3 innings pitched. With Lancaster, he won the 2022 Atlantic League championship. Rzepczynski became a free agent following the season.

== Personal life ==
Rzepczynski is of Polish descent. Rzepczynski's nickname is "Scrabble".

Rzepczynski is married to Lindzey Lawler of Cleveland, Ohio. They resided in Ladera Ranch, California, but sold the home in 2019.
