= Trever Miller =

American baseball player (born 1973)

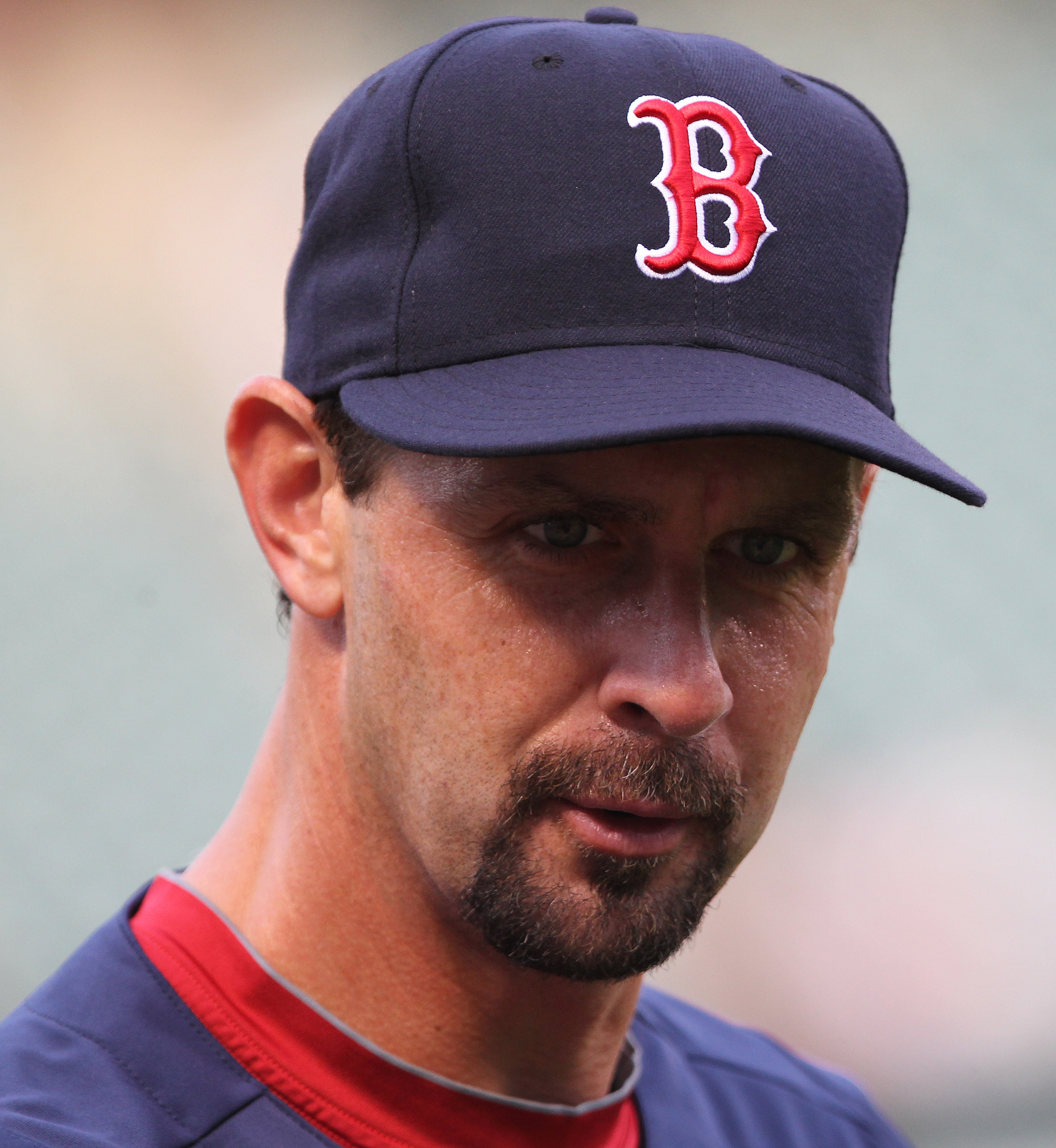
- Miller with the Boston Red Sox
- Pitcher
- Born: May 29, 1973 (age 52); Louisville, Kentucky, U.S.
- Batted: Right Threw: Left

MLB debut
- September 4, 1996, for the Detroit Tigers

Last MLB appearance
- September 24, 2011, for the Boston Red Sox

MLB statistics
- Win–loss record: 18–17
- Earned run average: 4.18
- Strikeouts: 434
- Stats at Baseball Reference

Teams
- Detroit Tigers (1996); Houston Astros (1998–1999); Philadelphia Phillies (2000); Los Angeles Dodgers (2000); Toronto Blue Jays (2003); Tampa Bay Devil Rays (2004–2005); Houston Astros (2006–2007); Tampa Bay Rays (2008); St. Louis Cardinals (2009–2011); Toronto Blue Jays (2011); Boston Red Sox (2011)

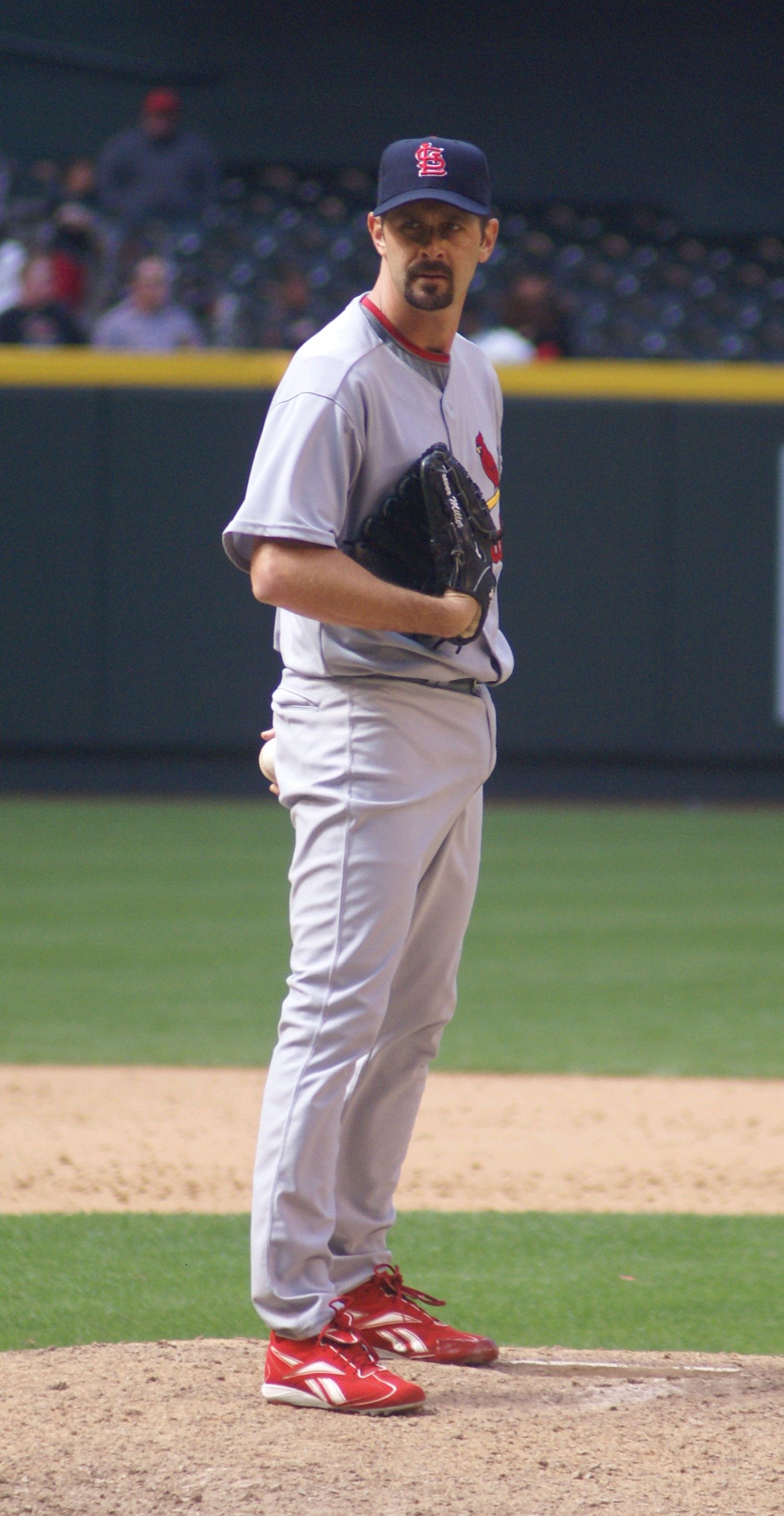
Miller pitching for the St. Louis Cardinals in 2009.

Trever Douglas Miller (born May 29, 1973) is an American former professional baseball pitcher.

== High school ==
Miller graduated from Trinity High School, where he was a pitcher and outfielder, in 1991 and was named Kentucky's Mr. Baseball and the Gatorade High School Player of the Year.

He was drafted by the Detroit Tigers in the 1st round (41st overall) of the 1991 Major League Baseball draft straight out of high school.

== Professional career ==
=== Detroit Tigers ===
Miller began his professional career in 1991 with the rookie level Bristol Tigers, where in 13 starts, he went 2–7 with a 5.67 ERA. In 1992, still with Bristol, Miller lowered his ERA to 4.93 and was promoted to Single-A Fayetteville to begin 1993. With Fayetteville, he again lowered his ERA this time to 4.19 in 28 starts. He was promoted to Double-A Trenton in 1994. 1995 was a breakout year for Miller. Pitching for Double-A Jacksonville, the Tigers' new Double-A affiliate, he went 8–2 with a 2.72 ERA in 31 appearances. Miller's 1995 performance was good enough that he was rated the Tigers' #10 prospect for 1996 and was promoted to Triple-A Toledo.

Miller went 13–6 for the Mud Hens and was a September call-up to the Tigers. He made his major league debut on September 4, 1996, against the Chicago White Sox, pitching 1 1/3 innings, giving up 2 earned runs, and taking the loss.

=== Houston Astros ===
On December 10, 1996, Miller was traded to the Houston Astros with Brad Ausmus, José Lima, C. J. Nitkowski, and Daryle Ward for Doug Brocail, Brian Hunter, Todd Jones, and Orlando Miller. Miller spent all of 1997 with the Triple-A New Orleans Zephyrs and had a 3.30 ERA in 29 games, all but two of them starts. In 1998, he was converted to a relief pitcher and spent the whole year on the major league roster; he went 2–0 with a 3.04 ERA in 37 games. He did not fare as well in 1999, as his ERA rose by over two runs.

=== Philadelphia Phillies/Los Angeles Dodgers ===
He was traded to the Philadelphia Phillies during the offseason for Yorkis Pérez.

Miller made the Phillies' team out of spring training, but was claimed off waivers by the Los Angeles Dodgers on May 19 and made one appearance for them before being sent to Triple-A Albuquerque. He was recalled and appeared in one more game for Dodgers on June 2 and became a free agent at the end of the season.

=== Boston Red Sox ===
On January 22, 2001, Miller signed a minor league contract with the Boston Red Sox and pitched as both a starter and reliever for Triple-A Pawtucket.

=== Cincinnati Reds ===
He became a free agent after the season and signed with the Cincinnati Reds. He was released by the Reds on September 4, 2002, without appearing in the majors.

=== Toronto Blue Jays ===
In 2003, Miller pitched for the Toronto Blue Jays and spent the entire year in the majors. He served as a Left-handed specialist and appeared in an American League-high 79 games.

=== Tampa Bay Devil Rays ===
He became a free agent after the season and signed with the Tampa Bay Devil Rays where he spent the next two seasons in their bullpen recording ERAs of 3.12 and 4.06.

=== Houston Astros ===
After becoming a free agent after the 2005 season, Miller signed with the Astros on January 10, 2006. In the next two seasons, Miller appeared in 70 and 76 games for Houston.

In 2007, Miller broke Scott Aldred's 9-year-old record for most appearances in a season without a decision.

He pitched in 76 games without earning a win or taking a loss, shattering the mark Aldred had set at 48 in 1998 as a member of the Tampa Bay Devil Rays. On August 3, 2008, Miller won a decision against the Detroit Tigers, ending this modern record at 121 games.

=== Tampa Bay Rays ===
On February 6, 2008, Miller signed a one-year deal with Tampa Bay worth $1.6 million with a team option for 2009 worth $2 million. In 68 games in 2008, Miller had a 4.15 ERA. Miller's option for 2009 was declined following the 2008 season.

=== St. Louis Cardinals ===
On December 3, 2008, Miller signed a one-year incentive-laden deal worth potentially $2 million with the St. Louis Cardinals.

He made his debut with the Cardinals on Opening Day, April 6, 2009. He relieved with 2 outs in the 6th inning, giving up 2 hits, being charged with a blown save, and striking out 2 batters in his 1.0 IP.

=== Toronto Blue Jays ===
On July 27, 2011, he was traded to the Toronto Blue Jays along with P. J. Walters, Brian Tallet and Colby Rasmus for Edwin Jackson, Octavio Dotel, Marc Rzepczynski and Corey Patterson. He was designated for assignment on August 16, after making six appearances in Toronto.

Miller was unconditionally released on August 21. He made just 6 appearances for Toronto and allowed 2 runs over 3.2 innings.

=== Boston Red Sox ===
On August 30, 2011, Miller signed a minor league contract with the Boston Red Sox and assigned to Triple-A Pawtucket. He had his contract selected to the major league roster on September 13. He became a free agent following the season.

=== Chicago Cubs ===
On January 30, 2012, Miller signed with the Chicago Cubs in a minor league deal, with a spring training invitation.

On March 26, 2012, the Cubs released Miller.

== Personal life ==
Miller and his wife Pari have three children, including a daughter named Grace who had two holes in her heart when she was born and a genetic disorder so rare that it doesn't have a name. Miller ran his first marathon, which was the Disney Marathon in January 2009 in a time of 4 hours, 27 minutes, 27 seconds. Trever also works with the Kiwanis of Gulf Beaches and St. Petersburg local Pamela McCann in "The Trever Miller Mob 5K/1 Mile" race. February 6, 2010, will mark the race's 2nd year. All proceeds made from the run are donated to the Kiwanis of Gulf Beaches Miracle League, which is a baseball related charity associated with children with disabilities.
