= Tyler Greene =

American baseball player (born 1983)

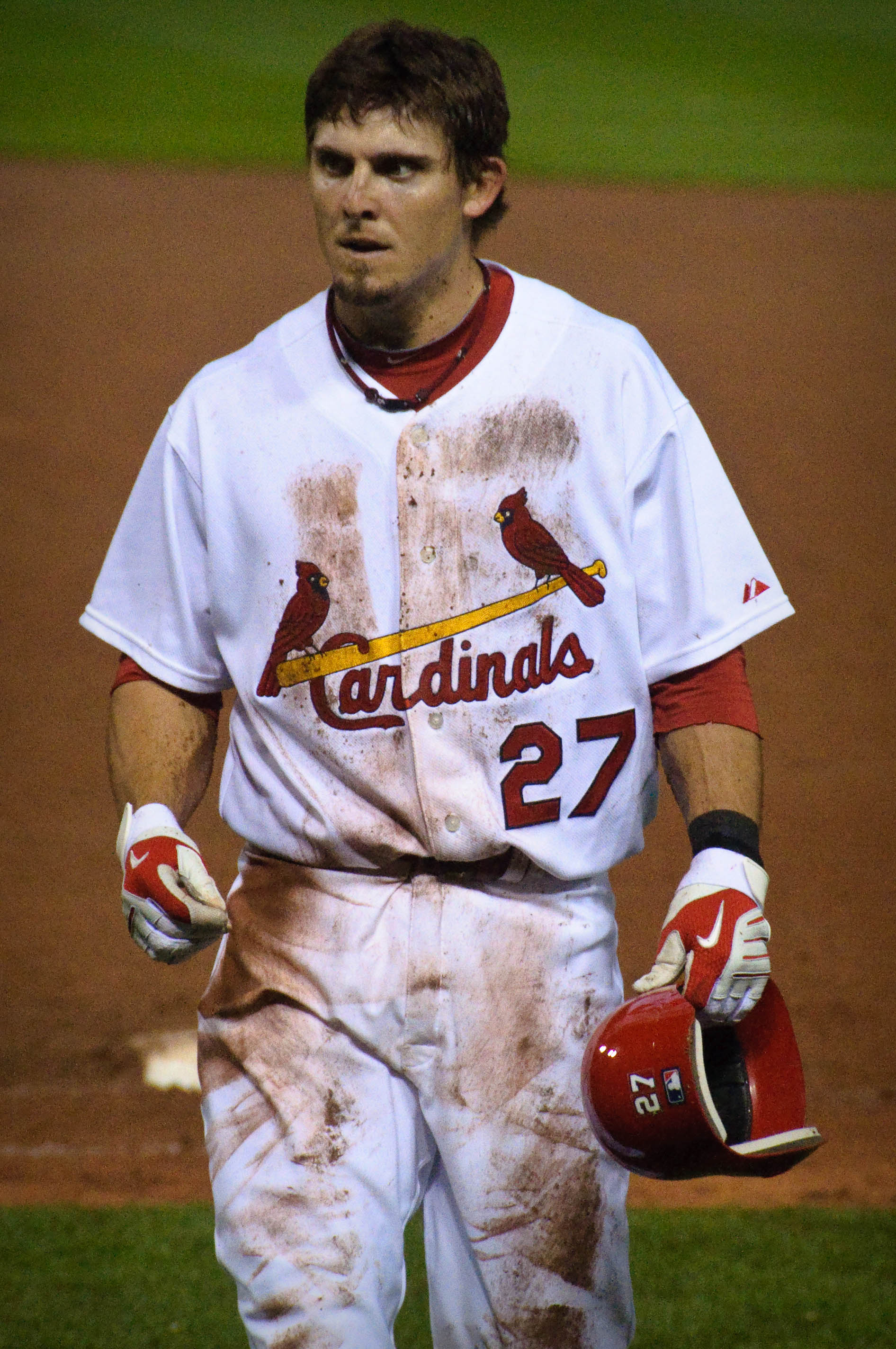
- Greene with the St. Louis Cardinals
- Second baseman / Shortstop
- Born: August 17, 1983 (age 43); Raleigh, North Carolina, U.S.
- Batted: Right Threw: Right

MLB debut
- April 30, 2009, for the St. Louis Cardinals

Last appearance
- June 2, 2013, for the Chicago White Sox

MLB statistics
- Batting average: .224
- Home runs: 17
- Runs batted in: 61
- Stats at Baseball Reference

Teams
- St. Louis Cardinals (2009–2012); Houston Astros (2012); Chicago White Sox (2013)
Medals
Men's baseball
Representing United States
Pan American Games
Silver medal – second place	2003 Santo Domingo	Team competition

James Tyler Greene (born August 17, 1983) is an American former professional baseball second baseman and shortstop. He played in Major League Baseball (MLB) for the St. Louis Cardinals, Houston Astros, and Chicago White Sox.

== Amateur career ==
Greene was born on August 17, 1983, in Raleigh, North Carolina. He graduated from St. Thomas Aquinas High School in Ft. Lauderdale, FL. He was drafted by Atlanta Braves in the 2nd round of the 2002 MLB draft, but did not sign. He then went on to attend Georgia Tech. In 2004, he played collegiate summer baseball in the Cape Cod Baseball League for the Orleans Cardinals and was named a league all-star.

Greene was the 30th overall pick in the 2005 MLB draft by the Cardinals.

== Professional career ==
=== St. Louis Cardinals ===
Greene made his MLB debut on April 30, 2009 against the Washington Nationals in Washington, D.C., when Brendan Ryan was placed on the 15-day disabled list with a strained hamstring.

He hit his first MLB career home run May 8, 2009, against the Cincinnati Reds in the eighth inning off reliever David Weathers. He was recalled on September 23 after the minor league season had ended. He was rated with "Best Infield Arm" in the Cardinals minor league system by Baseball America's Best Tools survey in 2006, 2007, 2008, and 2009.

On September 7, 2010, Greene was recalled by the Cardinals for the stretch run.

=== Houston Astros ===
On August 9, 2012, Greene was traded to the Houston Astros.

On March 26, 2013, Greene was released by the Astros.

=== Chicago White Sox ===
Greene signed with the Chicago White Sox on April 4, 2013. He then reported to Triple-A and provided infield depth. On April 14, 2013, Tyler was called up to the White Sox after Ángel Sánchez was placed on the DL. He was designated for assignment on June 3, 2013. On June 6, 2013, Tyler cleared waivers and was sent outright to Charlotte. On August 13, 2013, Greene was released.

=== Atlanta Braves ===
Greene signed a minor league deal with the Atlanta Braves on August 17, 2013, and was assigned to Class AAA Gwinnett.

On January 13, 2014, he was invited to spring training.

=== San Diego Padres ===
Greene was acquired by the San Diego Padres on April 22, 2014.

=== Philadelphia Phillies ===
Greene signed a minor league deal with the Phillies in January 2015. The deal did not include an invite to major league spring training. He was released on April 4.
