= Josh Kinney =

American baseball player (born 1979)

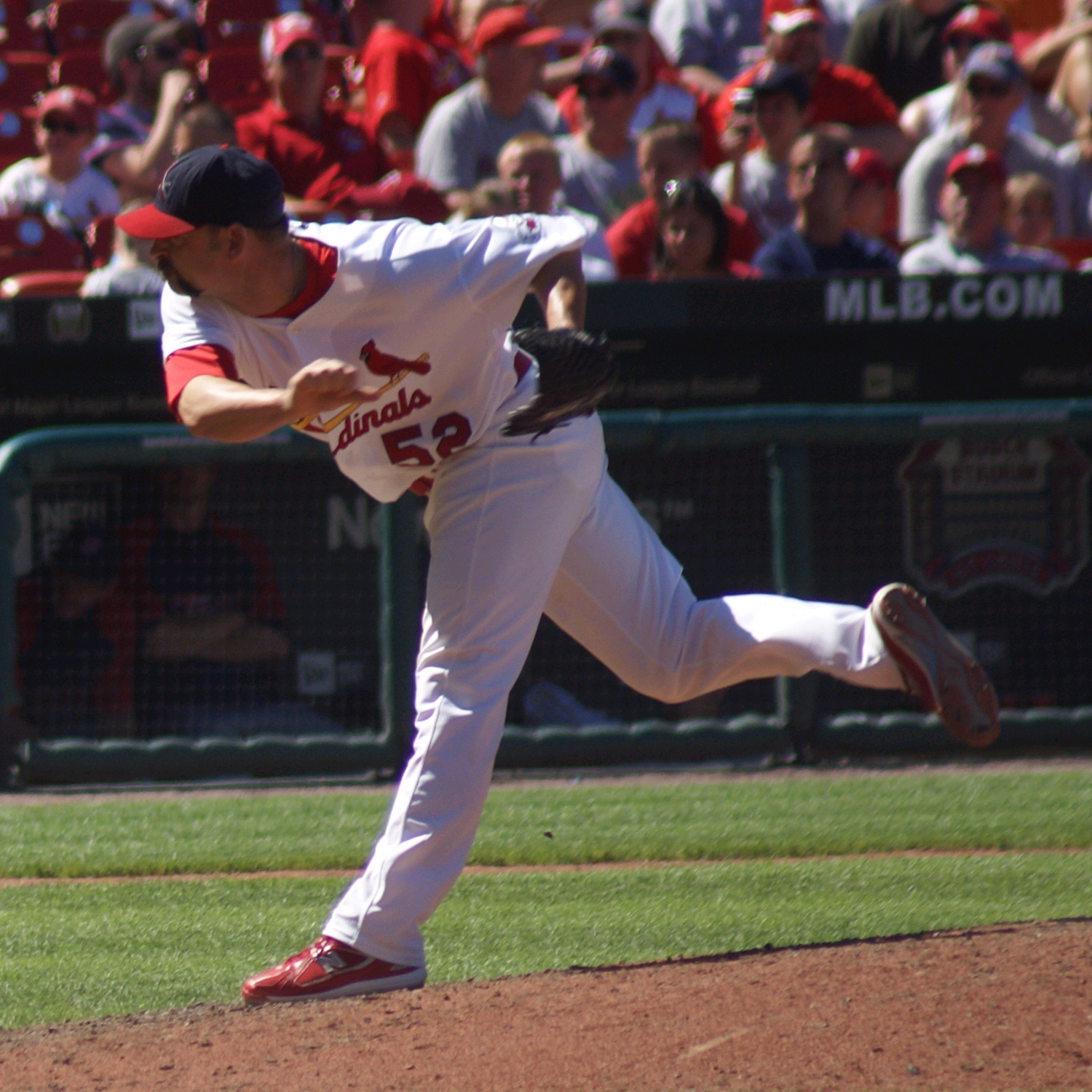
- Kinney with the St. Louis Cardinals
- Pitcher
- Born: March 31, 1979 (age 47); Coudersport, Pennsylvania, U.S.
- Batted: Right Threw: Right

MLB debut
- July 3, 2006, for the St. Louis Cardinals

Last MLB appearance
- October 1, 2012, for the Seattle Mariners

MLB statistics
- Win–loss record: 1–3
- Earned run average: 4.73
- Strikeouts: 94
- Stats at Baseball Reference

Teams
- St. Louis Cardinals (2006, 2008–2009); Chicago White Sox (2011); Seattle Mariners (2012)

Career highlights and awards
- World Series champion (2006)

Joshua Thomas Kinney (born March 31, 1979) is an American former professional baseball pitcher. He played in Major League Baseball (MLB) for the St. Louis Cardinals, Chicago White Sox, and Seattle Mariners. He threw a slider, four-seam fastball, curveball, and a two-seam fastball.

== Early and personal life ==
Kinney was born on March 31, 1979, in Coudersport, Pennsylvania. He attended Port Allegany High School and played high school baseball co-op with Oswayo Valley School. and went to college at Quincy University.

Kinney resides in Springfield, Missouri, with his wife, Jorni, and their two sons. His younger brother, Colby was a TACP/JTAC in the Air Force.

== Professional career ==
=== St. Louis Cardinals ===
Kinney signed as a free agent with the River City Rascals of the independent Frontier League on June 1, 2001. Two weeks later, the St. Louis Cardinals purchased his contract from River City and assigned to Short-Season A New Jersey Cardinals in the New York–Penn League. He was later promoted to the Single-A Peoria Chiefs, which was then a Cardinals affiliate in the Midwest League, where he made 27 appearances.

In 2002, Kinney was promoted to the Single-A Advanced Potomac Cannons in the Carolina League, where he had a 2.29 earned run average (ERA) in 44 appearances. For the start of the 2003 season, Kinney remained at Single-A Advanced level but St. Louis disaffiliated with the Cannons, creating instead the Palm Beach Cardinals in Florida State League. He was promoted to Tennessee Smokies, the Double-A affiliate in the Southern League. In 2003 and 2004, he bounced between Palm Beach and Tennessee. Kinney stayed at the Double-A level to begin the 2005 season, but St. Louis disaffiliated with the Smokies; thus he was sent to the Springfield Cardinals for their inaugural season. He excelled in Springfield, posting a 1.29 ERA in 32 appearances. At mid-season, Kinney was promoted to Triple-A Memphis Redbirds, where he pitched in 26 games.

Kinney began 2006 in Memphis, where he pitched well, maintaining an ERA under 1.60. He was first called up to the major leagues on July 2, 2006, which made Kinney the first Springfield Cardinals player to be called up to the St. Louis Cardinals. His first major league pitch was hit for a home run by the Atlanta Braves' Ryan Langerhans. He pitched in 10 games, then was optioned back to Memphis on August 1. Kinney was recalled again, on September 5, and pitched well enough to remain on the playoff roster. He pitched in the NLDS, the NLCS, and the 2006 World Series, winning a World Series ring after the Cardinals defeated the Detroit Tigers four games to one. Kinney pitched in Games 2 and 4, pitching a total of one inning with a 0.00 World Series ERA. In Game 2 of the World Series, he pitched 1/3 innings with a walk and a strikeout. In Game 4, he faced three batters, retiring two of them, one by way of strikeout.

After a few poor outings to begin 2007 spring training, Kinney had season-ending Tommy John surgery to repair a tear in his ulnar collateral ligament. A fractured elbow while rehabbing in 2007 further delayed his return, and Kinney did not make it back to the Cardinals until September 2008. He made a four-game rehab stint with Double-A Springfield. He then pitched in seven games in 2008 for the Cardinals, and did not give up a run in seven innings.

Kinney made the St. Louis Cardinals team out of spring training in 2009 but was optioned back to Memphis on April 17 after three appearances. He was recalled on June 18, but sent back on July 26. During that stint, Kinney earned his first Major League win, against the Minnesota Twins, on June 27 with 1.1 scoreless innings, allowing two hits and stranding two runners. He was recalled in the September call-up on September 23.

For 2010, Kinney was with the Memphis Redbirds for their entire season. Despite pitching well, having 17 saves and a 1.80 ERA, the Cardinals took him off their 40-man roster on July 2. Moreover, he was not part of the Cards' September call-up.

=== Chicago White Sox ===
On January 9, 2011, Kinney signed a contract with the Chicago White Sox organization. He was called up on August 19 to replace Philip Humber, who was hit in the head by a line drive and was placed on the disabled list. In 13 appearances for the White Sox, he struggled to a 6.62 ERA with 20 strikeouts across 17 2/3 innings pitched. On October 14, Kinney was removed from the 40-man roster and sent outright to the Triple-A Charlotte Knights. He became a free agent on October 18.

=== Seattle Mariners ===
Kinney signed a minor league contract with the Seattle Mariners on December 13, 2011. He made 35 appearances for the Mariners in the 2012 season. After the season, Kinney was re-signed to a one-year deal, but never pitched in the majors again. On March 11, 2013, Kinney injured his rib.

=== Pittsburgh Pirates ===
Kinney signed a minor league contract with the Pittsburgh Pirates after the 2013 season. He became a free agent after the 2014 season.
