= Brian Barden =

American baseball player (born 1981)

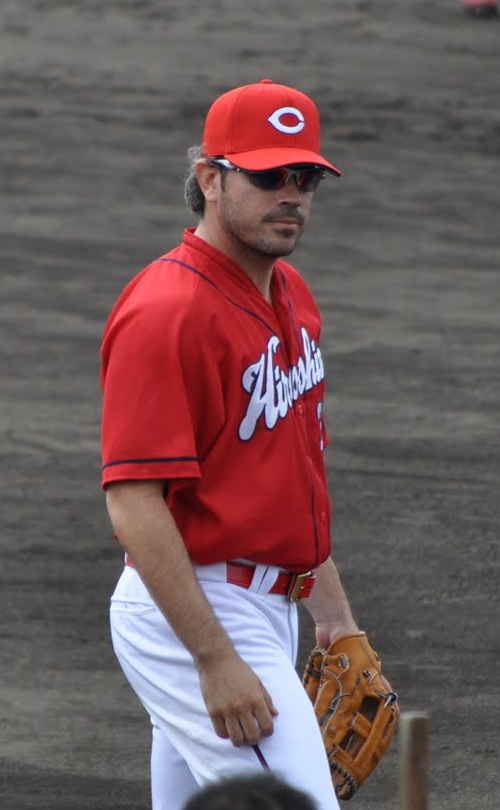
- Barden with the Hiroshima Toyo Carp
- Infielder
- Born: April 2, 1981 (age 44); Templeton, California, U.S.
- Batted: Right Threw: Right

Professional debut
- MLB: April 3, 2007, for the Arizona Diamondbacks
- NPB: August 2, 2011, for the Hiroshima Toyo Carp

Last appearance
- MLB: July 2, 2010, for the Florida Marlins
- NPB: October 25, 2011, for the Hiroshima Toyo Carp

MLB statistics
- Batting average: .211
- Home runs: 4
- Runs batted in: 14

NPB statistics
- Batting average: .281
- Home runs: 3
- Runs batted in: 20
- Stats at Baseball Reference

Teams
- Arizona Diamondbacks (2007); St. Louis Cardinals (2007–2009); Florida Marlins (2010); Hiroshima Toyo Carp (2011)
Medals
Men's baseball
Representing United States
Olympic Games
Bronze medal – third place	2008 Beijing	Team

Brian David Barden (born April 2, 1981) is an American former professional baseball infielder. He played for the Arizona Diamondbacks, St. Louis Cardinals, and Florida Marlins of Major League Baseball (MLB), and for the Hiroshima Toyo Carp of Nippon Professional Baseball (NPB).

== Early life ==
Barden attended St. Augustine High School in San Diego's North Park neighborhood and Oregon State University. In 2001, he played collegiate summer baseball with the Brewster Whitecaps of the Cape Cod Baseball League.

== Professional career ==
=== Arizona Diamondbacks ===
Barden was drafted by the Arizona Diamondbacks in the sixth round of the 2002 Major League Baseball draft. He made his major league debut with the Diamondbacks on April 3, 2007, against the Colorado Rockies, grounding out as a pinch hitter. His first hit was a single to center field off Shawn Hill of the Washington Nationals on April 8. That was his only hit in 6 at-bats for the Diamondbacks in the 8 games he played for them in 2007, with the rest of his time being spent with the AAA Tucson Sidewinders.

=== St. Louis Cardinals ===
He was selected off waivers by St. Louis Cardinals on August 13, 2007.

Barden was batting .295 with nine home runs and 35 RBI for the Cardinals' Triple-A Pacific Coast League affiliate, the Memphis Redbirds, when his season was ended as the result of being named to the 2008 USA Olympic Baseball Team.

On May 5, 2009, he was named NL Rookie of the Month for April.

=== Florida Marlins ===
On December 14, 2009, Barden signed a minor league contract with the Florida Marlins. He was added to the Major League roster on April 3, but designated for assignment on July 3, 2010.

=== Texas Rangers ===
For the 2011 season, he signed a minor league contract with the Texas Rangers and played for the AAA Round Rock Express before opting out on July 1.

=== Hiroshima Toyo Carp ===
Brian signed a 1-year contract with the Hiroshima Toyo Carp of Nippon Professional Baseball on July 18, 2011. He played in 64 games and hit .281.

=== Los Angeles Dodgers ===
He signed a minor league contract with the Los Angeles Dodgers on January 5, 2013, and was assigned to the AAA Albuquerque Isotopes. He played in 123 games and hit .277, while playing primarily third base.

=== Piratas de Campeche ===
On April 1, 2014, Barden signed with the Piratas de Campeche of the Mexican Baseball League. He was released on April 14, 2014.

=== Leones de Yucatan ===
On March 31, 2014, Barden signed with the Leones de Yucatan of the Mexican Baseball League. He was released on May 29, 2014.

=== Somerset Patriots ===
On June 10, 2014, Barden signed with the Somerset Patriots of the Atlantic League of Professional Baseball. He became a free agent after the 2014 season.
