= 2010 Chicago Cubs season =

2010 Chicago Cubs
- League: National League
- Division: Central
- Ballpark: Wrigley Field
- City: Chicago, Illinois
- Record: 75–87 (.463)
- Divisional place: 5th
- Owners: Family trust of Joe Ricketts
- General managers: Jim Hendry
- Managers: Lou Piniella (51-74); Mike Quade (24-13)
- Television: WGN-TV; WGN America; CSN Chicago; CSN Chicago Plus; WCIU-TV (Len Kasper, Bob Brenly)
- Radio: WGN (AM); Chicago Cubs Radio Network (Pat Hughes, Ron Santo, Judd Sirott)

The 2010 Chicago Cubs season was the 139th season of the Chicago Cubs franchise, the 135th in the National League and the 95th at Wrigley Field. The Cubs finished fifth in the National League Central with a record of 75–87.

The Cubs played 10 extra inning games during the season, the fewest of any MLB team in 2010.

== Off-season ==
In December 2009, Florida Governor Charlie Crist met with Cubs president Crane Kenney, chairman Tom Ricketts and other team officials about possibly moving the Cubs' spring training and minor league facilities from Mesa to Naples. In January 2010, however, the city of Mesa approved an agreement that would have the Cubs remain in that city for spring training through 2035, with the city building a new $84 million stadium and training facility. The agreement would take effect pending financing legislation and subsequent voter referendum in November 2010.

== 2009 post-season changes ==
=== Trades ===
November 19, 2009	To Arizona Diamondbacks Aaron Heilman	To Chicago Cubs Scott Maine and Ryne White
December 3, 2009	to Oakland Athletics Aaron Miles and Jake Fox	to Chicago Cubs Jeff Gray and Minor League Prospects
December 18, 2009	to Seattle Mariners Milton Bradley	to Chicago Cubs Carlos Silva

=== Free agent acquisitions ===
Player	Former team	Contract Terms
Marlon Byrd	Texas Rangers	3 years, $15,000,000
Xavier Nady	New York Yankees	1 year, $3,300,000
Chad Tracy	Arizona Diamondbacks	1 year, $900,000
Kevin Millar	Toronto Blue Jays	Undisclosed

=== Players lost to free agency ===
Player	New team
Rich Harden	Texas Rangers
Neal Cotts	Pittsburgh Pirates
So Taguchi	Orix Buffaloes
Kevin Gregg	Toronto Blue Jays
Reed Johnson	Los Angeles Dodgers

== Regular season ==
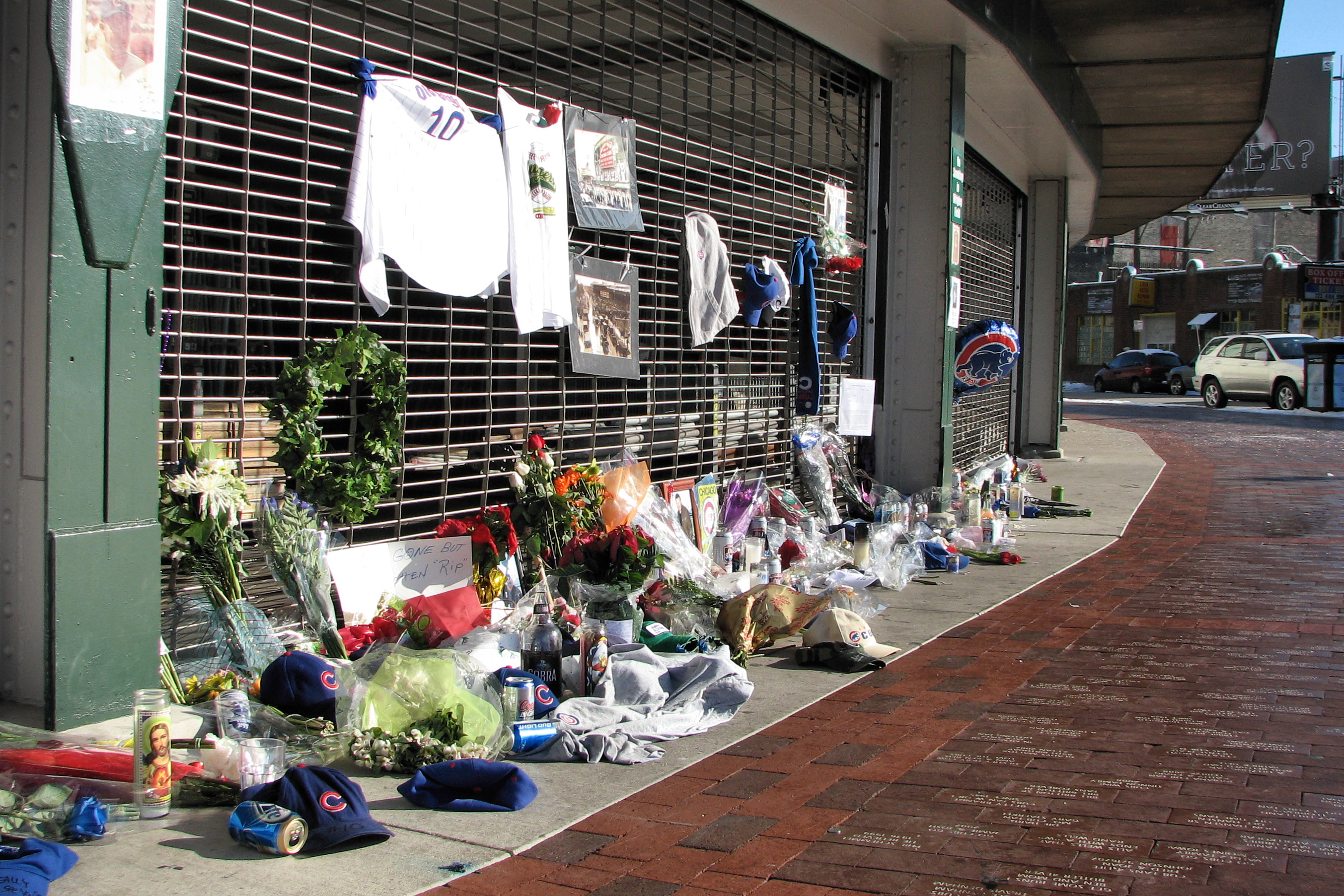
Memorial outside Wrigley Field following Ron Santo's death in 2010

=== Midseason Trades ===
March 27, 2010	to Texas Rangers Andrés Blanco	to Chicago Cubs Player to be named, or cash
August 1, 2010	To Los Angeles Dodgers Ted Lilly and Ryan Theriot	To Chicago Cubs Blake DeWitt, Kyle Smitt and Brett Wallach
August 12, 2010	to San Francisco Giants Mike Fontenot	to Chicago Cubs Evan Crawford
August 19, 2010	to Atlanta Braves Derrek Lee	to Chicago Cubs Robinson Lopez, Tyrelle Harris and Jeffrey Lorick

=== Season standings ===
==== National League Central ====
NL Central
Team	W	L	Pct.	GB	Home	Road
Cincinnati Reds	91	71	.562	—	49‍–‍32	42‍–‍39
St. Louis Cardinals	86	76	.531	5	52‍–‍29	34‍–‍47
Milwaukee Brewers	77	85	.475	14	40‍–‍41	37‍–‍44
Houston Astros	76	86	.469	15	42‍–‍39	34‍–‍47
Chicago Cubs	75	87	.463	16	35‍–‍46	40‍–‍41
Pittsburgh Pirates	57	105	.352	34	40‍–‍41	17‍–‍64

==== National League Wild Card ====
Division leaders
Team	W	L	Pct.
Philadelphia Phillies	97	65	.599
San Francisco Giants	92	70	.568
Cincinnati Reds	91	71	.562

Wild Card team (Top team qualifies for postseason)
Team	W	L	Pct.	GB
Atlanta Braves	91	71	.562	—
San Diego Padres	90	72	.556	1
St. Louis Cardinals	86	76	.531	5
Colorado Rockies	83	79	.512	8
Florida Marlins	80	82	.494	11
Los Angeles Dodgers	80	82	.494	11
New York Mets	79	83	.488	12
Milwaukee Brewers	77	85	.475	14
Houston Astros	76	86	.469	15
Chicago Cubs	75	87	.463	16
Washington Nationals	69	93	.426	22
Arizona Diamondbacks	65	97	.401	26
Pittsburgh Pirates	57	105	.352	34

==== Record vs. opponents ====
2010 National League record Source: MLB Standings Grid – 2010
Team	AZ	ATL	CHC	CIN	COL	FLA	HOU	LAD	MIL	NYM	PHI	PIT	SD	SF	STL	WSH	AL
Arizona	–	3–4	1–6	2–5	9–9	3–3	4–3	5–13	3–4	5–1	2–4	2–4	8–10	5–13	4–5	3–4	6–9
Atlanta	4–3	–	4–2	3–2	2–4	11–7	5–1	5–3	5–2	11–7	8–10	6–3	4–2	4–3	2–6	8–10	9–6
Chicago	6–1	2–4	–	4–12	2–3	4–2	7–11	3–4	9–6	3–4	4–2	5–10	3–5	2–5	9–6	4–2	8–10
Cincinnati	5–2	2–3	12–4	–	2–5	5–2	10–5	5–4	11–3	4–2	2–5	10–6	2–4	3–4	6–12	4–3	8–7
Colorado	9–9	4–2	3–2	5–2	–	3–4	2–4	7–11	5–4	3–3	1–6	3–4	12–6	9–9	3–4	5–3	9–6
Florida	3–3	7–11	2–4	2–5	4–3	–	3–3	4–2	4–4	12–6	5–13	6–2	3–6	2–5	3–2	13–5	7–8
Houston	3–4	1–5	11–7	5–10	4–2	3–3	–	2–4	8–7	3–4	4–3	11–4	2–5	2–7	10–5	4–4	3–12
Los Angeles	13–5	3–5	4–3	4–5	11–7	2–4	4–2	–	4–2	3–4	2–4	4–3	8–10	8–10	3–4	3–3	4–11
Milwaukee	4–3	2–5	6–9	3–11	4–5	4–4	7–8	2–4	–	5–2	1–5	13–5	3–4	2–5	8–7	4–2	9–6
New York	1–5	7–11	4–3	2–4	3–3	6–12	4–3	4–3	2–5	–	9–9	6–1	3–3	3–4	3–3	9–9	13–5
Philadelphia	4–2	10–8	2–4	5–2	6–1	13–5	3–4	4–2	5–1	9–9	–	2–4	5–2	3–3	4–4	12–6	10–8
Pittsburgh	4–2	3–6	10–5	6–10	4–3	2–6	4–11	3–4	5–13	1–6	4–2	–	0–6	2–4	6–9	1–5	2–13
San Diego	10–8	2–4	5–3	4–2	6–12	6–3	5–2	10–8	4–3	3–3	2–5	6–0	–	12–6	3–4	3–3	9–6
San Francisco	13–5	3–4	5–2	4–3	9–9	5–2	7–2	10–8	5–2	4–3	3–3	4–2	6–12	–	3–3	4–2	7–8
St. Louis	5–4	6–2	6–9	12–6	4–3	2–3	5–10	4–3	7–8	3–3	4–4	9–6	4–3	3–3	–	3–3	9–6
Washington	4–3	10–8	2–4	3–4	3–5	5–13	4–4	3–3	2–4	9–9	6–12	5–1	3–3	2–4	3–3	–	5–13

=== Game log ===
2010 Game Log: 75–87 (Home: 35–46, Away: 40–41)
April: 11–13 (Home: 5–6; Away: 6–7)

#	Date	Opponent	Score	Win	Loss	Save	Attendance	Record
1	April 5	@ Braves	16–5	Lowe (1–0)	Zambrano (0–1)		53,081	0–1
2	April 7	@ Braves	3–2	Moylan (1–0)	Grabow (0–1)		36,170	0–2
3	April 8	@ Braves	2–0	Dempster (1–0)	Hanson (0–1)	Mármol (1)	27,443	1–2
4	April 9	@ Reds	5–4	Owings (1–0)	Caridad (0–1)		24,419	1–3
5	April 10	@ Reds	4–3	Zambrano (1–1)	Rhodes (0–1)	Mármol (2)	27,235	2–3
6	April 11	@ Reds	3–1	Masset (1–0)	Grabow (0–2)	Cordero (2)	25,168	2–4
7	April 13	Brewers	9–5	Dempster (1–0)	Davis (0–1)		41,306	3–4
8	April 14	Brewers	7–6	Gray (1–0)	Hawkins (0–1)	Mármol (3)	39,565	4–4
9	April 15	Brewers	8–6	Narveson (1–0)	Samardzija (0–1)	Hoffman (3)	38,026	4–5
10	April 16	Astros	7–2	Silva (1–0)	Paulino (0–1)		37,291	5–5
11	April 17	Astros	4–3	Oswalt (1–2)	Gorzelanny (0–1)	Lindstrom (1)	40,471	5–6
12	April 18	Astros	3–2 (10)	Byrdak (1-0)	Marshall (0-1)	Lindstrom (2)	39,506	5-7
13	April 19	@ Mets	6–1	Nieve (1–1)	Russell (0–1)		27,940	5–8
14	April 20	@ Mets	4–0	Pelfrey (3–0)	Zambrano (1–2)		27,502	5–9
15	April 21	@ Mets	9–3	Silva (2–0)	Pérez (0–2)		25,684	6–9
16	April 22	@ Mets	5–2	Santana (2–1)	Gorzelanny (0–2)	Rodríguez (1)	28,535	6–10
17	April 23	@ Brewers	8–1	Dempster (2–0)	Suppan (0–1)		37,848	7–10
18	April 24	@ Brewers	5–1	Lilly (1–0)	Davis (0–2)		43,410	8–10
19	April 25	@ Brewers	12–2	Wells (2–0)	Bush (1–1)		38,364	9–10
20	April 26	Nationals	4–3 (10)	Mármol (1-0)	Bruney (1-1)		37,850	10-10
21	April 27	Nationals	3–1	Hernández (3-1)	Gorzelanny (0-3)	Capps (9)	37,440	10-11
22	April 28	Nationals	3–2	Atilano (2-0)	Dempster (2-1)	Capps (10)	36,660	10-12
23	April 29	Diamondbacks	13–5	Kennedy (1-1)	Lilly (1-1)		36,850	10-13
24	April 30	Diamondbacks	11–5	Wells (3-0)	López (1-1)		37,800	11-13

May: 13–15 (Home: 9–7; Away: 4–8)

#	Date	Opponent	Score	Win	Loss	Save	Attendance	Record
25	May 1	Diamondbacks	7–5	Marshall (1-1)	Gutierrez (0-3)	Mármol (4)	40,368	12-13
26	May 2	Diamondbacks	10–5	Gorzelanny (1-3)	Jackson (1-3)		38,144	13-13
27	May 4	@ Pirates	3–2	Maholm (2-2)	Dempster (2-2)	Dotel (4)	10,972	13-14
28	May 5	@ Pirates	4–2	Morton (1-5)	Lilly (1-2)	Dotel (5)	11,053	13-15
29	May 6	@ Pirates	11–1	Burres (2-1)	Wells (3-1)		11,085	13-16
30	May 7	@ Reds	14–7	Silva (3-0)	Bailey (0-2)		20,030	14-16
31	May 8	@ Reds	14–2	Harang (2-4)	Gorzelanny (1-4)		26,404	14-17
32	May 9	@ Reds	5–3	Leake (3-0)	Dempster (2-3)	Cordero (10)	20,402	14-18
33	May 10	Marlins	4–2	Robertson (3-3)	Lilly (1-3)	Núñez (6)	38,266	14-19
34	May 11	Marlins	3–2	Nolasco (3-2)	Wells (3-2)	Núñez (7)	38,007	14-20
35	May 12	Marlins	4–3	Silva (4-0)	Volstad (3-3)	Mármol (5)	38,637	15-20
36	May 14	Pirates	10–6	Meek (2-1)	Zambrano (1-3)		39,082	15-21
37	May 15	Pirates	4–3	Maholm (3-3)	Dempster (2-4)	Dotel (7)	41,336	15-22
38	May 16	Pirates	4–3	Marshall (2-1)	Carrasco (1-1)	Mármol (6)	40,636	16-22
39	May 17	Rockies	4–2 (11)	Marshall (3-1)	Belisle (1-1)		35,760	17-22
40	May 18	Rockies	6–2	Silva (5-0)	Chacin (2-2)		37,029	18-22
41	May 19	@ Phillies	4–1	Gorzelanny (2-4)	Moyer (2-4)	Mármol (7)	45,140	19-22
42	May 20	@ Phillies	5–4	Báez (2-1)	Grabow (0-3)	Contreras (2)	45,325	19-23
43	May 21	@ Rangers	2–1	Lewis(4-2)	Lilly (1-4)	Feliz (12)	38,943	19-24
44	May 22	@ Rangers	5–4 (10)	Marshall (4-1)	O'day (1-2)	Mármol (8)	46,180	20-24
45	May 23	@ Rangers	5–4	Silva (6-0)	Wilson (3-2)	Mármol (9)	37,777	21-24
46	May 25	Dodgers	3–0	Dempster (3-4)	Kershaw (4-3)	Mármol (10)	34,749	22-24
47	May 26	Dodgers	8–5	Billingsley (6-2)	Gorzelanny (2-5)	Broxton (11)	35,828	22-25
48	May 27	Dodgers	1–0	Marshall (5-1)	Ely (3-2)	Mármol (11)	33,868	23-25
49	May 28	Cardinals	7–1	Carpenter (6-1)	Wells (3-3)		39,536	23-26
50	May 29	Cardinals	5–0	Silva (7-0)	Ottavino (0-1)		40,601	24-26
51	May 30	Cardinals	9–1	Wainwright (7-3)	Dempster (3-5)		41,353	24-27
52	May 31	@ Pirates	2–1	Meek (3-1)	Marshall (5-2)	Dotel (11)	20,235	24-28

June: 10–16 (Home: 5–7; Away: 5–9)

#	Date	Opponent	Score	Win	Loss	Save	Attendance	Record
53	June 1	@ Pirates	3–2	Hanrahan (2-1)	Lilly (1-5)	Dotel (12)	11,334	24-29
–	June 2	@ Pirates	Postponed (rain); rescheduled for June 7					
54	June 4	@ Astros	3–1	Paulino (1-7)	Zambrano (1-4)	Lindstrom (12)	28,784	24-30
55	June 5	@ Astros	8–5	Dempster (4-5)	Oswalt (3-8)	Mármol (12)	34,241	25-30
56	June 6	@ Astros	6–3	Myers (4-3)	Wells (3-4)	Lindstrom (13)	29,493	25-31
57	June 7	@ Pirates	6–1	Silva (8-0)	Eveland (3-5)	Marshall (1)	12,768	26-31
58	June 8	@ Brewers	3–2	Axford (2-1)	Mármol (1-1)		30,082	26-32
59	June 9	@ Brewers	9–4	Zambrano (2-4)	Wolf (4-6)		30,326	27-32
60	June 10	@ Brewers	5–4 (10)	Axford (3-1)	Howry (1-1)		36,363	27-33
61	June 11	White Sox	10–5	Peavy (5-5)	Wells (3-5)		41,129	27-34
62	June 12	White Sox	2–1	Buehrle (4-6)	Silva (8-1)	Jenks (11)	40,397	27-35
63	June 13	White Sox	1–0	Lilly (2-5)	Floyd (2-7)	Mármol (13)	40,456	28-35
64	June 15	Athletics	9–5	Cahill (6-2)	Zambrano (2-5)		34,390	28-36
65	June 16	Athletics	6–2	Dempster (5-5)	Gonzalez (6-5)		36,244	29-36
66	June 17	Athletics	3–2	Mármol (2-1)	Blevins (2-1)		36,942	30-36
67	June 18	Angels	7–6	Kazmir (7-5)	Silva (8-2)	Rodney (6)	39,729	30-37
68	June 19	Angels	12–0	Weaver (7-3)	Lilly (2-6)		40,008	30-38
69	June 20	Angels	12–1	Zambrano (3-5)	Saunders (5-8)		39,850	31-38
70	June 22	@ Mariners	2–0	Vargas (6-2)	Dempster (5-6)	Aardsma (16)	27,975	31-39
71	June 23	@ Mariners	8–1	Lee (6-3)	Wells (3-6)		31,394	31-40
72	June 24	@ Mariners	3–2 (13)	Grabow (1-3)	Olson (0-2)	Gorzelanny (1)	41,329	32-40
73	June 25	@ White Sox	6–0	Peavy (7-5)	Zambrano (3-6)		39,364	32-41
74	June 26	@ White Sox	3–2	Putz (4-2)	Cashner (0-1)	Thornton (3)	39,479	32-42
75	June 27	@ White Sox	8–6	Dempster (6-6)	Danks (7-6)		39,682	33-42
76	June 28	Pirates	2–1	Maholm (5-6)	Cashner (0-2)	Dotel (15)	38,512	33-43
77	June 29	Pirates	3–1	Lilly (3-6)	Karstens (2-3)	Mármol (14)	36,914	34-43
78	June 30	Pirates	2–0	Lincoln (1-2)	Cashner (0-3)	Dotel (16)	37,391	34-44

July: 12–14 (Home: 7–7; Away: 5–7)

#	Date	Opponent	Score	Win	Loss	Save	Attendance	Record
79	July 1	Reds	3–2	Smith (1-0)	Howry (1-2)	Cordero (22)	36,880	34-45
80	July 2	Reds	12–0	Arroyo (8-4)	Dempster (6-7)		40,361	34-46
81	July 3	Reds	3–1	Wells (4-6)	Smith (1-1)	Mármol (15)	40,677	35-46
82	July 4	Reds	14–3	Leake (6-1)	Lilly (3-7)		41,079	35-47
83	July 5	@ Diamondbacks	9–4	Gorzelanny (3-5)	Kennedy (3-7)		26,250	36-47
84	July 6	@ Diamondbacks	6–4	Silva (9-2)	Enright (1-1)	Mármol (16)	20,067	37-47
85	July 7	@ Diamondbacks	8–3	Dempster (7-7)	Jackson (6-7)		20,914	38-47
86	July 8	@ Dodgers	3–2	Kershaw 9-4	Wells (4-7)	Broxton (19)	43,640	38-48
87	July 9	@ Dodgers	9–7	Billingsley (7-4)	Lilly (3-8)		43,790	38-49
88	July 10	@ Dodgers	7–3	Gorzelanny (4-5)	Ely (4-7)		49,016	39-49
89	July 11	@ Dodgers	7–0	Padilla (4-2)	Silva (9-3)		45,398	39-50
90	July 15	Phillies	12–6	Dempster (8-7)	Moyer (9-9)		40,879	40-50
91	July 16	Phillies	4–3	Marshall (6-2)	Madson (2-1)	Mármol (17)	40,622	41-50
92	July 17	Phillies	4–1	Durbin (1-1)	Mármol (2-2)	Lidge (7)	40,924	41-51
93	July 18	Phillies	11–6	Gorzelanny (5-5)	Halladay (10-8)		39,333	42-51
94	July 19	Astros	11–5	Rodríguez (7-11)	Silva (9-4)		35,514	42-52
95	July 20	Astros	14–7	Cashner (1-3)	Lyon (5-4)		36,401	43-52
96	July 21	Astros	4–3 (12)	Lyon (6-4)	Howry (1-3)	Chacin (1)	38,533	43-53
97	July 23	Cardinals	5–0	Wells (5-7)	Suppan (0-6)		40,687	44-53
98	July 24	Cardinals	6–5	Gorzelanny (6-5)	Hawksworth (4-6)	Mármol (18)	41,009	45-53
99	July 25	Cardinals	4–3 (11)	Franklin (5-1)	Schlitter (0-1)	Reyes (1)	41,406	45-54
100	July 26	@ Astros	5–2	Silva (10-4)	Wright (0-1)	Mármol (19)	25,037	46-54
101	July 27	@ Astros	6–1	Myers (8-6)	Cashner (1-4)		28,047	46-55
102	July 28	@ Astros	8–1	Norris (3-7)	Wells (5-8)		28,046	46-56
103	July 30	@ Rockies	17–2	Francis (4-3)	Dempster (8-8)		40,189	46-57
104	July 31	@ Rockies	6–5	Street (2-2)	Marshall (6-3)		48,065	46-58

August: 10–19 (Home: 3–12; Away: 7–7)

#	Date	Opponent	Score	Win	Loss	Save	Attendance	Record
105	August 1	@ Rockies	8–7	de la Rosa (4-3)	Silva (10-5)		38,256	46-59
106	August 2	Brewers	18–1	Gallardo (10-5)	Wells (5-9)		37,731	46-60
107	August 3	Brewers	4–3	Narveson (9-7)	Diamond (0-1)	Axford (16)	36,183	46-61
108	August 4	Brewers	15–3	Dempster (9-8)	Parra (3-9)		38,425	47-61
109	August 6	Reds	3–0	Arroyo (12-6)	Gorzelanny (6-6)	Cordero (30)	40,696	47-62
110	August 7	Reds	4–3	Ondrusek (3-0)	Wells (5-10)	Masset (2)	41,227	47-63
111	August 8	Reds	11–4	Wood (3-1)	Diamond (0-2)		39,016	47-64
112	August 9	@ Giants	4–3 (11)	Ray (5-0)	Mateo (0-1)		41,943	47-65
113	August 10	@ Giants	8–6	Dempster (10-8)	Lincecum (11-6)		35,389	48-65
114	August 11	@ Giants	5–4	Romo (5-3)	Berg (0-1)	Wilson (33)	36,139	48-66
115	August 12	@ Giants	8–7	Wilson (3-1)	Cashner (1-5)		40,872	48-67
116	August 13	@ Cardinals	6–3	Westbrook (7-7)	Diamond (0-3)	Franklin (21)	45,546	48-68
117	August 14	@ Cardinals	3–2	Zambrano (4-6)	Carpenter (13-4)	Mármol (20)	46,313	49-68
118	August 15	@ Cardinals	9–7	Dempster (11-8)	Lohse (1-5)	Mármol (21)	44,074	50-68
119	August 16	Padres	9–5	Correia (10-7)	Gorzelanny (6-7)		36,814	50-69
120	August 17	Padres	1–0	Garland (12-8)	Wells (5-11)	Bell (36)	33,664	50-70
121	August 18	Padres	5–1	Richard (11-5)	Coleman (0-1)		33,267	50-71
122	August 19	Padres	5–3	Latos (13-5)	Marshall (6-4)	Bell (37)	30,687	50-72
123	August 20	Braves	5–3	Moylan (5-2)	Mármol (2-3)	Wagner (30)	39,345	50-73
124	August 21	Braves	5–4	Gorzelanny (7-7)	Hanson (8-9)	Mármol (22)	41,099	51-73
125	August 22	Braves	16–5	Minor (2-0)	Wells (5-12)		37,518	51-74
126	August 23	@ Nationals	9–1	Coleman (1-1)	Hernández (8-9)		17,921	52-74
127	August 24	@ Nationals	5–4	Zambrano (5-6)	Lannan (5-6)	Mármol (23)	18,250	53-74
128	August 25	@ Nationals	4–0	Dempster (12-8)	Marquis (0-7)	Mármol (24)	18,344	54-74
129	August 27	@ Reds	7–1	Cueto (12-4)	Gorzelanny (7-8)		36,219	54-75
130	August 28	@ Reds	3–2	Wells (6-12)	Arroyo (14-8)	Mármol (24)	41,292	55-75
131	August 29	@ Reds	7–5	Ondrusek (4-0)	Marshall (6-5)	Cordero (35)	30,809	55-76
132	August 30	Pirates	14–2	Zambrano (6-6)	Maholm (7-13)		29,538	56-76
133	August 31	Pirates	14–7	Karstens (3-10)	Dempster (12-9)		31,369	56-77

September: 17–9 (Home: 6–7; Away: 11–1)

#	Date	Opponent	Score	Win	Loss	Save	Attendance	Record
134	September 1	Pirates	5–3	Diamond (1-3)	McDonald (2-5)	Mármol (25)	33,555	57-77
135	September 3	Mets	7–6	Russell (1-1)	Dickey (9-6)	Mármol (26)	31,424	58-77
136	September 4	Mets	5–3	Zambrano (7-6)	Mejia (0-3)	Mármol (27)	39,473	59-77
137	September 5	Mets	18–5	Niese (9-7)	Dempster (12-10)		40,788	59-78
138	September 6	Astros	5–4	Cashner (2-5)	López (5-2)	Mármol (28)	31,647	60-78
139	September 7	Astros	7–3	Figueroa (5-2)	Silva (10-6)		31,596	60-79
140	September 8	Astros	4–0	Myers (11-7)	Wells (6-13)		33,623	60-80
141	September 10	@ Brewers	4–0	Zambrano (8-6)	Bush (7-12)	Mármol (29)	30,975	61-80
142	September 11	@ Brewers	1–0	Dempster (13-10)	Wolf (11-11)	Mármol (30)	41,463	62-80
143	September 12	@ Brewers	2–0	Gallardo (12-7)	Coleman (1-2)	Axford (21)	37,317	62-81
144	September 13	@ Cardinals	5–1	Samardzija (1-1)	García (13-8)		40,720	63-81
145	September 14	@ Cardinals	7–2	Wells (7-13)	Wainwright (18-11)		40,509	64-81
146	September 15	@ Cardinals	7–3	Zambrano (9-6)	Carpenter (15-7)	Mármol (31)	41,145	65-81
147	September 17	@ Marlins	2–0	Dempster (14-10)	Sanabia (4-3)	Mármol (32)	22,751	66-81
148	September 18	@ Marlins	5–3	Coleman (2-2)	Sánchez (12-10)	Mármol (33)	28,716	67-81
149	September 19	@ Marlins	13–3	Samardzija (2-1)	Miller (1-3)		20,203	68-81
150	September 21	Giants	1–0	Ramírez (1-3)	Cashner (2-6)	Wilson (44)	36,364	68-82
151	September 22	Giants	2–0	Wells (8-13)	Sánchez (11-9)	Mármol (34)	37,285	69-82
152	September 23	Giants	13–0	Bumgarner (6-6)	Dempster (14-11)		34,481	69-83
153	September 24	Cardinals	7–1	Wainwright (20-11)	Gorzelanny (7-9)		36,553	69-84
154	September 25	Cardinals	7–3	Coleman (3-2)	Carpenter (15-9)		39,316	70-84
155	September 26	Cardinals	8–7	Westbrook (9-11)	Samardzija (2-2)	Franklin (26)	38,057	70-85
156	September 27	@ Padres	1–0	Zambrano (10-6)	Stauffer (5-5)	Mármol (35)	22,739	71-85
157	September 28	@ Padres	5–2	Dempster (15-11)	Laots (14-9)	Mármol (36)	27,619	72-85
158	September 29	@ Padres	3–0	Young (2-0)	Wells (8-14)	Bell (45)	29,400	72-86
159	September 30	@ Padres	1–0	Marshall (7-5)	Bell (6-1)	Mármol (37)	28,576	73-86

October: 2–1 (Home: 0–0; Away: 2–1)

#	Date	Opponent	Score	Win	Loss	Save	Attendance	Record
160	October 1	@ Astros	2–0	Coleman (4-2)	Norris (9-10)	Mármol (38)	33,869	74-86
161	October 2	@ Astros	8–3	Zambrano (11-6)	Happ (6-4)		36,098	75-86
162	October 3	@ Astros	4–0	Figueroa (7-4)	Dempster (15-12)		31,105	75-87

== Roster ==
2010 Chicago Cubs
Roster
Pitchers: 60 Mitch Atkins; 64 Justin Berg; 33 Esmailin Caridad; 48 Andrew Cashner; 27 Casey Coleman; 46 Ryan Dempster; 20 Thomas Diamond; 32 Tom Gorzelanny; 43 John Grabow; 34 Jeff Gray; 62 Bob Howry; 30 Ted Lilly; 57 Scott Maine; 49 Carlos Mármol; 45 Sean Marshall; 62 Marcos Mateo; 40 James Russell; 29 Jeff Samardzija; 51 Brian Schlitter; 52 Carlos Silva; 44 Jeff Stevens; 36 Randy Wells; 38 Carlos Zambrano	Catchers: 53 Welington Castillo; 55 Koyie Hill; 18 Geovany Soto; Infielders: 28 Jeff Baker; 15 Darwin Barney; 13 Starlin Castro; 9 Blake DeWitt; 17 Mike Fontenot; 6 Micah Hoffpauir; 25 Derrek Lee; 22 Xavier Nady; 16 Aramis Ramírez; 19 Bobby Scales; 2 Ryan Theriot; 9 Chad Tracy; Outfielders: 15,24 Marlon Byrd; 21 Tyler Colvin; 1 Kosuke Fukudome; 5 Sam Fuld; 56 Brad Snyder; 12 Alfonso Soriano	Manager: 41 Lou Piniella; 8 Mike Quade; Coaching Staff: 11 Iván DeJesús (first base) (third base); 2 Bob Dernier (first base); 7 Rudy Jaramillo (hitting); 8 Mike Quade (third base); 50 Larry Rothschild (pitching); 39 Matt Sinatro (coach); 35 Lester Strode (bullpen); 3 Alan Trammell (bench)

== Player stats ==
=== Batting ===
==== Starters by position ====
Note: Pos = Position; G = Games played; AB = At bats; R = Runs scored; H = Hits; 2B = Doubles; 3B = Triples; HR = Home runs; Avg. = Batting average; RBI = Runs batted in; SB = Stolen bases

Pos	Player	G	AB	R	H	2B	3B	HR	RBI	Avg.	SB
2B, 3B, 1B	Jeff Baker	79	206	29	56	13	2	4	21	.272	1
2B	Darwin Barney	30	79	12	19	4	0	0	2	.241	0
CF	Marlon Byrd	152	580	84	170	39	2	12	66	.293	5
C	Welington Castillo	7	20	3	6	4	0	1	5	.300	0
SS	Starlin Castro	125	463	53	139	31	5	3	41	.300	10
OF	Tyler Colvin	135	358	60	91	18	5	20	56	.254	6
2B	Blake DeWitt	53	184	18	46	9	1	4	22	.250	1
2B, 3B, SS	Mike Fontenot	76	170	14	48	11	3	1	20	.282	1
RF	Kosuke Fukudome	130	358	45	94	20	2	13	44	.263	7
OF	Sam Fuld	19	28	3	4	1	0	0	3	.143	0
C	Koyie Hill	77	215	18	46	13	1	1	17	.214	1
RF, 1B	Micah Hoffpauir	24	52	5	9	3	0	0	5	.173	0
1B	Derrek Lee	109	418	63	105	21	0	16	56	.251	1
OF, 1B	Xavier Nady	119	317	33	81	13	0	6	33	.256	0
3B	Aramis Ramírez	124	465	61	112	21	1	25	83	.241	0
3B	Bobby Scales	10	13	4	4	0	0	0	2	.308	1
RF	Brad Snyder	12	27	1	5	1	0	0	5	.185	0
LF	Alfonso Soriano	147	496	67	128	40	3	24	79	.258	5
C	Geovany Soto	105	322	47	90	19	0	17	53	.280	0
2B	Ryan Theriot	96	388	45	110	10	2	1	21	.284	16
3B, 1B	Chad Tracy	28	44	6	11	2	0	0	5	.250	0
	Non-Pitcher Totals	162	5202	671	1374	293	27	148	639	.264	55

==== Pitchers batting ====
Note: Pos = Position; G = Games played; AB = At bats; R = Runs scored; H = Hits; 2B = Doubles; 3B = Triples; HR = Home runs; Avg. = Batting average; RBI = Runs batted in; SB = Stolen bases

Pos	Player	G	AB	R	H	2B	3B	HR	RBI	Avg.	SB
P	Mitch Atkins	5	2	0	0	0	0	0	0	.000	0
P	Andrew Cashner	51	2	0	0	0	0	0	0	.000	0
P	Casey Coleman	12	20	2	2	1	0	0	2	.100	0
P	Ryan Dempster	33	59	3	8	1	0	0	2	.136	0
P	Thomas Diamond	16	7	1	0	0	0	0	0	.000	0
P	Tom Gorzelanny	28	40	1	5	0	0	0	2	.125	0
P	Ted Lilly	16	31	1	1	0	0	0	1	.032	0
P	Sean Marshall	74	4	0	0	0	0	0	0	.000	0
P	Marcos Mateo	21	2	0	0	0	0	0	0	.000	0
P	James Russell	57	4	0	0	0	0	0	0	.000	0
P	Jeff Samardzija	7	4	0	1	0	0	0	1	.250	0
P	Carlos Silva	19	31	0	2	1	0	0	2	.065	0
P	Randy Wells	30	52	1	9	2	0	0	3	.173	0
P	Carlos Zambrano	40	52	5	12	0	0	1	6	.231	0
	Pitcher Totals	162	310	14	40	5	0	1	19	.129	0

Note: All pitchers who batted during the season is noted above.

=== Pitching ===
==== Starting and other pitchers ====
Note: W = Wins; L = Losses; ERA = Earned run average; G = Games pitched; GS = Games started; SV = Saves; IP = Innings pitched; H = Hits allowed; R = Runs allowed; ER = Earned runs allowed; BB = Walks allowed; K = Strikeouts

Player	W	L	ERA	G	GS	SV	IP	H	R	ER	BB	K
Casey Coleman	4	2	4.11	12	8	0	57.0	56	27	26	25	27
Ryan Dempster	15	12	3.85	34	34	0	215.1	198	110	92	86	208
Thomas Diamond	1	3	6.83	16	3	0	29.0	33	23	22	18	36
Tom Gorzelanny	7	9	4.09	29	23	1	136.1	136	70	62	68	119
Ted Lilly	3	8	3.69	18	18	0	117.0	104	53	48	29	89
Jeff Samardzija	2	2	8.38	7	3	0	19.1	21	22	18	20	9
Carlos Silva	10	6	4.22	21	21	0	113.0	120	55	53	24	80
Randy Wells	8	14	4.26	32	32	0	194.1	209	97	92	63	144
Carlos Zambrano	11	6	3.33	36	20	0	129.2	119	55	48	69	117

==== Relief pitchers ====
Note: W = Wins; L = Losses; ERA = Earned run average; G = Games pitched; GS = Games started; SV = Saves; IP = Innings pitched; H = Hits allowed; R = Runs allowed; ER = Earned runs allowed; BB = Walks allowed; K = Strikeouts

Player	W	L	ERA	G	GS	SV	IP	H	R	ER	BB	K
Mitch Atkins	0	0	6.30	5	0	0	10.0	12	8	7	6	10
Justin Berg	0	1	5.18	41	0	0	40.0	45	27	23	20	14
Esmailin Caridad	0	1	11.25	8	0	0	4.0	4	7	5	5	4
Andrew Cashner	2	6	4.80	53	0	0	54.1	55	31	29	30	50
John Grabow	1	3	7.36	28	0	0	25.2	35	24	21	13	20
Jeff Gray	1	0	6.75	7	0	0	9.1	12	9	7	5	4
Bob Howry	1	3	7.71	38	0	0	35.0	47	36	30	13	14
Scott Maine	0	0	2.08	13	0	0	13.0	9	4	3	5	11
Carlos Mármol	2	3	2.55	77	0	38	77.2	40	23	22	52	138
Sean Marshall	7	5	2.65	80	0	1	74.2	58	25	22	25	90
Marcos Mateo	0	1	5.82	21	0	0	21.1	20	15	14	9	26
James Russell	1	1	4.96	57	0	0	49.0	55	37	27	11	42
Brian Schlitter	0	1	12.38	7	0	0	8.0	18	11	11	5	7
Jeff Stevens	0	0	6.11	18	0	0	17.2	21	15	12	10	15
Team Pitching Totals	75	87	4.18	162	162	40	1436.2	1409	767	668	605	1268

== Awards and honors ==
All-Star Game

- Marlon Byrd, Outfield, Reserve

== Farm system ==
Level	Team	League	Manager
AAA	Iowa Cubs	Pacific Coast League	Ryne Sandberg
AA	Tennessee Smokies	Southern League	Bill Dancy
A	Daytona Cubs	Florida State League	Buddy Bailey
A	Peoria Chiefs	Midwest League	Casey Kopitzke
A-Short Season	Boise Hawks	Northwest League	Jody Davis
Rookie	AZL Cubs	Arizona League	Juan Cabreja
