= Casey Coleman (baseball) =

American baseball player (born 1987)

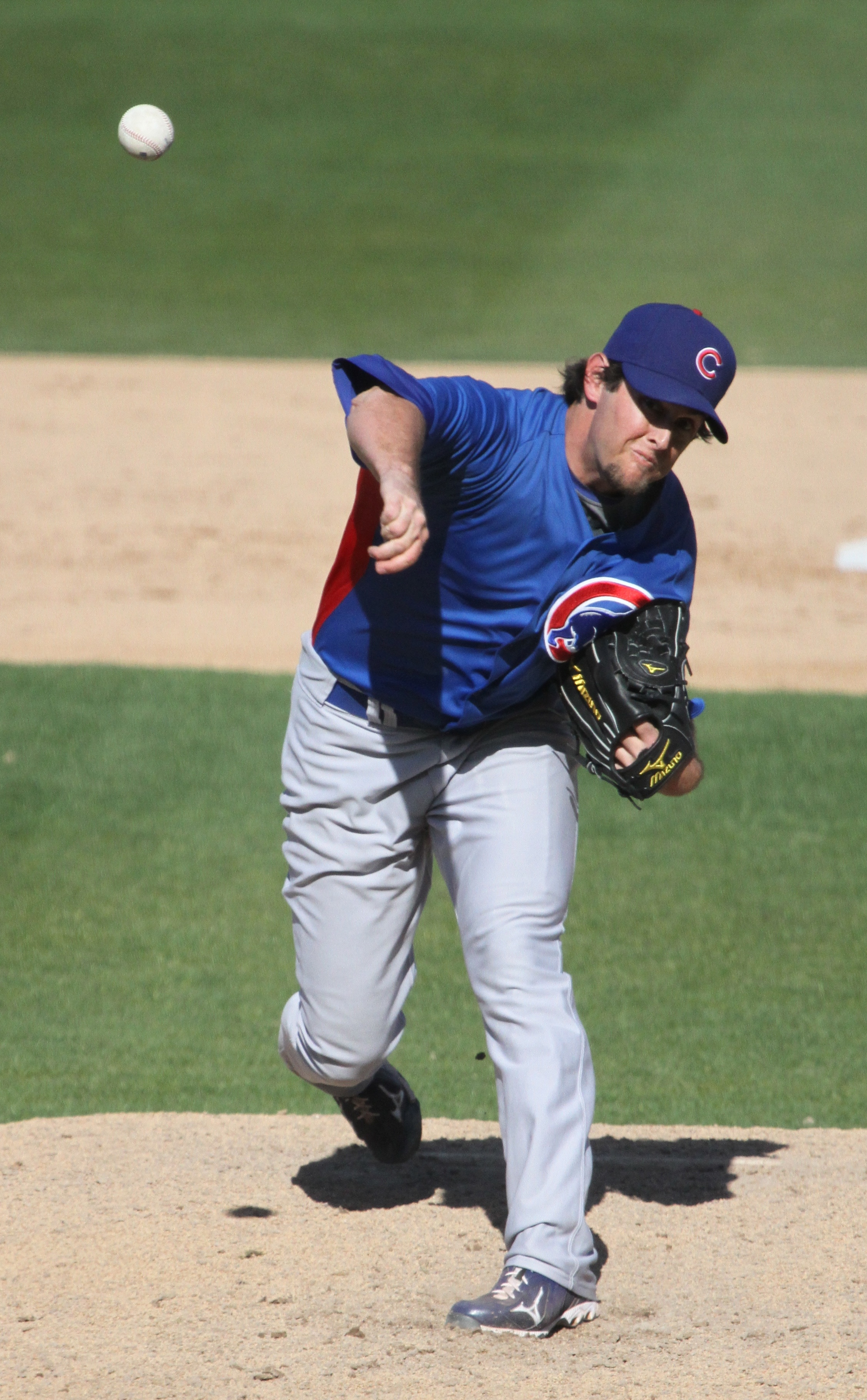
- Coleman with the Chicago Cubs in 2012
- Pitcher
- Born: July 3, 1987 (age 39); Fort Myers, Florida, U.S.
- Batted: Left Threw: Right

MLB debut
- August 2, 2010, for the Chicago Cubs

Last MLB appearance
- September 28, 2014, for the Kansas City Royals

MLB statistics
- Win–loss record: 8–13
- Earned run average: 5.72
- Strikeouts: 123
- Stats at Baseball Reference

Teams
- Chicago Cubs (2010–2012); Kansas City Royals (2014)
Medals
Men's baseball
Representing United States
WBSC Premier12
Silver medal – second place	2015 Tokyo	Team
Pan American Games
Silver medal – second place	2015 Toronto	Team

Joseph Casey Coleman (born July 3, 1987) is an American former professional baseball pitcher. He has previously played in Major League Baseball (MLB) for the Chicago Cubs and Kansas City Royals.

== Early life ==
Coleman was born in Fort Myers, Florida, and graduated from Mariner High School in Cape Coral, Florida. He played college baseball at Florida Gulf Coast University (FGCU) for the Florida Gulf Coast Eagles baseball team. At FGCU, Coleman was teammates with future major league pitchers Richard Bleier and Chris Sale.

== Career ==
=== Chicago Cubs ===
Coleman was drafted by the Cubs in the 15th round (461st overall) of the 2008 Major League Baseball draft.

On August 2, 2010, Coleman was called up to the major leagues for the first time. On August 23, he earned his first MLB win on a 9–1 victory against the Washington Nationals. He also recorded his first career RBI in the same game.

In 2011, Coleman did not make the team out of spring training and was optioned to the Triple-A Iowa Cubs. After injuries to starting pitchers Andrew Cashner and Randy Wells, he was recalled to Chicago and made his first start of the season on April 10 against the Milwaukee Brewers. On May 28, 2011, Coleman was optioned to Iowa after Randy Wells was activated from the 15-day disabled list.

In 2012, Coleman made 17 appearances for the Cubs, registering a 7.40 ERA and 5.9 K/9 in 24 1/3 innings of work. On November 28, 2012, Coleman was designated for assignment by the Cubs. He cleared waivers and was sent outright to Triple-A Iowa two days later.

On April 14, 2014, Coleman was released by the Cubs organization.

=== Kansas City Royals ===
On April 15, 2014, Coleman signed a minor league contract with the Kansas City Royals organization. On May 16, Coleman was selected to the active roster. Coleman appeared in 10 games for Kansas City in 2014, recording a 5.25 ERA with 5 strikeouts in 12 innings. On December 15, Coleman was designated for assignment. He cleared waivers and was sent outright to the Triple-A Omaha Storm Chasers on December 24.

After spending the 2015 season in Triple-A with Omaha, Coleman elected free agency on October 5, 2015.

=== Seattle Mariners ===
On December 17, 2015, Coleman signed a minor league contract with the Seattle Mariners organization. On April 4, 2016, Coleman was released by the Mariners, but quickly re-signed with the team on a new minor league contract. In 27 appearances out of the bullpen for the Triple-A Tacoma Rainiers, he compiled a 2-0 record and 2.08 ERA with 38 strikeouts and 4 saves across 39 innings pitched. On July 2, Coleman opted out of his contract and elected free agency.

=== Tampa Bay Rays ===
On July 7, 2016, Coleman signed a minor league contract with the Tampa Bay Rays organization. He spent the remainder of the season with the High–A Charlotte Stone Crabs and Triple–A Durham Bulls, posting a 3.86 ERA in 11 games for Durham, and a 3.38 ERA in 2 games for Charlotte. Coleman elected free agency following the season on November 7.

=== New Britain Bees ===
On April 7, 2017, Coleman signed with the New Britain Bees of the Atlantic League of Professional Baseball.

=== Houston Astros ===
On April 30, 2017, Coleman's contract was selected by the Houston Astros. In 12 starts for the Triple-A Fresno Grizzlies, he struggled to a 3-5 record and 6.75 ERA with 56 strikeouts over 64 innings of work. Coleman was released by the Astros organization on July 6.

=== New Britain Bees (second stint) ===
On July 24, 2017, Coleman re-signed with the New Britain Bees of the Atlantic League of Professional Baseball. He became a free agent after the season.

=== Sugar Land Skeeters ===
On May 26, 2018, Coleman signed with the Sugar Land Skeeters of the Atlantic League of Professional Baseball. In 7 games (6 starts) for Sugar Land, Coleman logged a 3-0 record and 0.96 ERA with 38 strikeouts across 37 1/3 innings pitched.

=== Chicago Cubs (second stint) ===
On July 3, 2018, Coleman's contract was purchased by the Chicago Cubs organization. In 10 games and 5 starts he was 2–4 with a 6.91 ERA and with a 23/10 K/BB ratio. Coleman elected free agency following the season on November 2.

=== New York Mets ===
On January 3, 2019, Coleman signed a minor league contract with the New York Mets. In 19 appearances (15 starts) for the Triple–A Syracuse Mets, he struggled to a 1-7 record and 5.85 ERA with 53 strikeouts across 64 2/3 innings pitched. Coleman was released by the Mets organization on July 4.

=== Toros de Tijuana ===
On July 23, 2019, Coleman signed with the Toros de Tijuana of the Mexican League. Coleman did not play in a game in 2020 due to the cancellation of the LMB season because of the COVID-19 pandemic. He later became a free agent.

=== Leones de Yucatán ===
On February 25, 2022, Coleman signed with the Leones de Yucatán of the Mexican League. He missed the 2022 season after undergoing surgery to repair a dislocated shoulder. Coleman did not appear in a game for the club in 2023 as well.

=== Conspiradores de Querétaro ===
On November 21, 2023, Coleman was selected by the Conspiradores de Querétaro in the team's expansion draft. He spent the whole year on the injured list and did not play in a game in 2024. Coleman re-signed with Querétaro on March 12, 2025. He did not appear in a game in 2025 making it the fourth straight season not appearing in a game.

== Personal life ==
Both his father and grandfather were pitchers in MLB, making them the fourth family with three generations of major leaguers. His father, Joe, played from 1965 to 1979, and his grandfather, also named Joe, played from 1942 to 1955. He is also the first (and to date, only) third-generation pitcher in Major League history.

== See also ==
- Third-generation Major League Baseball families
