= Justin Berg =

American baseball player (born 1984)

- Pitcher
- Born: June 7, 1984 (age 42); Antigo, Wisconsin, U.S.
- Batted: Right Threw: Right

MLB debut
- August 13, 2009, for the Chicago Cubs

Last MLB appearance
- May 25, 2011, for the Chicago Cubs

MLB statistics
- Win–loss record: 0–1
- Earned run average: 4.08
- Strikeouts: 27
- Stats at Baseball Reference

Teams
- Chicago Cubs (2009–2011)

Justin Christopher Berg (born June 7, 1984) is an American right-handed former professional baseball pitcher.

Berg played high school baseball in Wisconsin for the Antigo Red Robins. He began his college baseball career at Indian Hills Community College in Iowa. He was selected by the New York Yankees in the 43rd round of the 2003 Major League Baseball draft with the 1,290th overall pick. He did not sign immediately. In the summer of 2003, he played collegiate summer baseball for the Wisconsin Woodchucks and won a Northwoods League championship. He then played a season of college baseball at Triton College in Illinois before signing with the Yankees.

He began his professional career in 2004 with the Staten Island Yankees of the New York–Penn League. On August 27, 2005, the Yankees traded Berg to the Chicago Cubs for Matt Lawton, a reigning All-Star.

He made his Major League debut on August 13, 2009, against the Philadelphia Phillies at Wrigley Field, pitching two scoreless innings in relief of Ryan Dempster. Berg made the opening day roster the following season. He was sent down on May 21 after underperforming but recalled on July 5. He was a regular in the Chicago bullpen for most of the season, appearing in 41 games and throwing 40 innings. Berg only pitched twelve innings in his final Major League season in 2011. His final big league came on May 25, 2011, against the New York Mets. He entered in relief of Casey Coleman and faced three batters: he walked Jason Bay on four pitches to load the bases, walked Daniel Murphy on four pitches to drive in a run and then walked Justin Turner on four pitches to drive in a second run. In September 2011, he underwent Tommy John surgery and was removed from the Cubs' 40-man roster but returned to their farm system during the 2012 season.

Before the 2013 season, Berg signed a minor league contract with the Colorado Rockies. He spent the 2013 season with the Colorado Springs Sky Sox in the Pacific Coast League. He pitched from 2014 until 2016 in the independent Atlantic League with the Southern Maryland Blue Crabs. He also pitched in 2015 for San Marino in the Italian Baseball League. His playing career ended in 2016 due to a hip injury.

In 2018, Berg returned to the Northwoods League to serve as the pitching coach for the Kenosha Kingfish.
