= Marcos Mateo =

Dominican baseball player (born 1984)

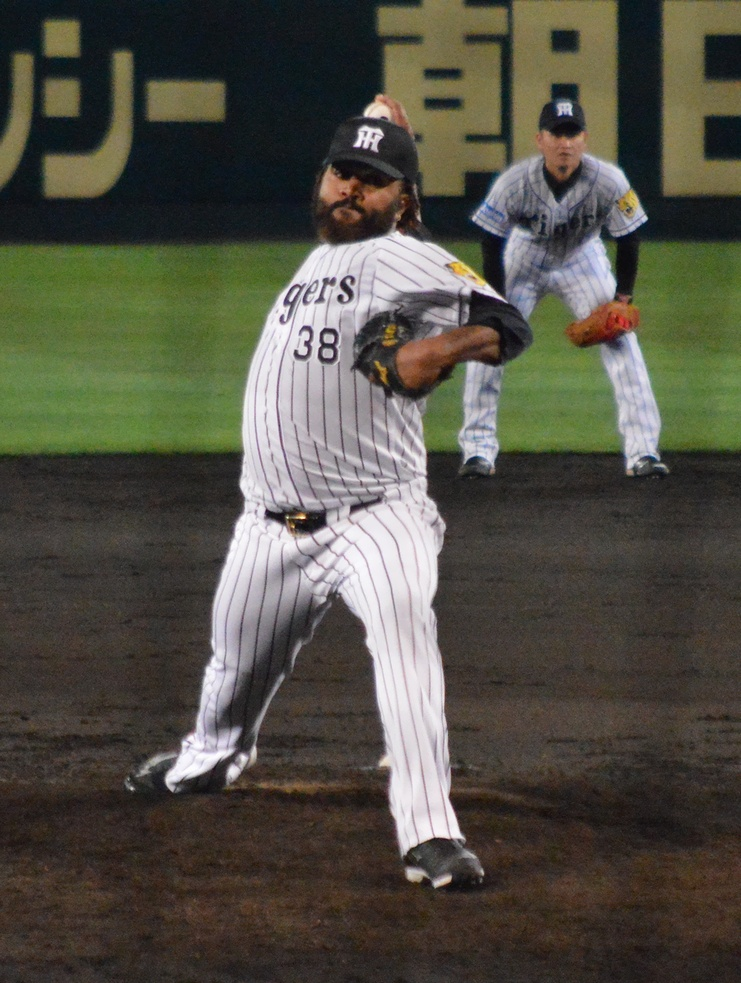
- Mateo with the Hanshin Tigers
- Pitcher
- Born: April 18, 1984 (age 42); Sabana Grande de Palenque, Dominican Republic
- Batted: Right Threw: Right

Professional debut
- MLB: August 9, 2010, for the Chicago Cubs
- NPB: March 26, 2016, for the Hanshin Tigers

Last appearance
- MLB: October 2, 2015, for the San Diego Padres
- NPB: September 2, 2018, for the Hanshin Tigers

MLB statistics
- Win–loss record: 1–3
- Earned run average: 4.92
- Strikeouts: 63
- WHIP: 1.40

NPB statistics
- Win–loss record: 8–8
- Earned run average: 2.80
- Strikeouts: 131
- Saves: 20
- Stats at Baseball Reference

Teams
- Chicago Cubs (2010–2012); San Diego Padres (2015); Hanshin Tigers (2016–2018)

Career highlights and awards
- 2x NPB All-Star (2016, 2017)

Marcos Aurelio Mateo Lora (born April 18, 1984) is a Dominican right-handed former professional baseball pitcher. He played in Major League Baseball (MLB) for the Chicago Cubs and San Diego Padres, and in Nippon Professional Baseball (NPB) for the Hanshin Tigers.

== Playing career ==
=== Cincinnati Reds ===
On February 13, 2004, Mateo was signed as an international free agent by the Cincinnati Reds. Upon joining the Reds, Mateo joined their Rookie-level minor league affiliate, the Gulf Coast League Reds. In one season with the GCL Reds, he pitched in 13 games, had a 4–3 win–loss record, a 4.30 Earned Run Average (ERA), 23 strikeouts, and a 1.46 WHIP.

In the 2006 season, Mateo joined the Billings Mustangs of the rookie-level Pioneer League, where in 18 games, he went 5–1 with a 4.30 ERA and 30 strikeouts. Mateo spent the 2007 campaign with the Single-A Dayton Dragons, where he put together a 3.50 ERA, 63 strikeouts, and a 1.278 WHIP in 41 appearances.

=== Chicago Cubs ===
On September 12, 2007, after Dayton's season was over, Mateo was traded to the Chicago Cubs as the player to be named later from the trade that saw Buck Coats be traded to the Reds on August 30.

To begin the 2008 season, Mateo was assigned to the Cubs' Single-A affiliate, the Peoria Chiefs. In eight games, he struck out 20 batters in just 15 innings pitched, which prompted a call-up to the High-A Daytona Cubs. Mateo pitched in 25 games for Daytona, recording a 3.57 ERA, a 1.31 WHIP, and 65 strikeouts. His performance with both Peoria and Daytona prompted the Cubs to add him to their 40-man roster on November 11, to protect him from being selected in the Rule 5 draft. MLB.com, at the same time, considered Mateo to be a "top prospect" for the Cubs. Mateo started the 2009 season with Daytona again, but was quickly promoted after not allowing a run in nine innings. Reportedly, the Cubs wanted to test him as a starting pitcher before calling him up to Double-A. On April 26, Mateo made his debut for the Double-A Tennessee Smokies. He pitched 3 2/3 innings for the Smokies, walked four and struck out one, but only allowed one run. In 34 total games for Tennessee, Mateo would make a total of 13 other starts and finished the season with a 4.07 ERA, a 1.44 WHIP, and 70 strikeouts across 97 1/3 innings pitched.

Mateo began the 2010 season with Tennessee, recording a 2.18 ERA, a 1.258 WHIP, and 29 strikeouts, before being called up to the Triple-A Iowa Cubs at the end of July. He pitched eight games for Iowa, before being called up to the Cubs on August 9, 2010, replacing Mitch Atkins on the 25-man roster. In his major league debut, Mateo came into the game in the 11th inning and gave up a sacrifice fly to Pat Burrell of the San Francisco Giants, which allowed the winning run to score for the Giants. Mateo had given up two hits and a walk to load the bases before Burrell drove in the winning run. He would go on to pitch in 20 more games for Chicago in 2010, recording a 5.82 ERA, a 1.338 WHIP, and 26 strikeouts over 21 2/3 innings of work.

During spring training in 2011, Mateo was on the roster bubble for a spot in the bullpen and was in a race with veterans Carlos Silva and Braden Looper for the final pitching spot on the team. However, on March 26, Mateo ended up winning the battle as both Looper and Silva were released by the team. Mateo made 23 appearances for the Cubs during the year, compiling a 1–2 record and 4.30 ERA with 25 strikeouts over 23 innings of work.

On June 1, 2012, Mateo underwent Tommy John surgery, ruling him out for the remainder of the season. On October 25, Mateo was removed from the 40-man roster and sent outright to Iowa. He spent the 2013 season in rehabilitation, posting a 1.74 ERA with 30 strikeouts in 24 appearances split between the Triple-A Iowa Cubs, Tennessee, and the AZL Cubs.

On December 12, 2013, Mateo was selected by the Arizona Diamondbacks with the fifteenth pick in the Rule 5 draft. However, he did not make the team out of spring training, and was returned to the Cubs organization on March 13, 2014. Mateo spent the entirety of the year with Triple-A Iowa, posting a 3–0 record and 3.86 ERA with 43 strikeouts and two saves in 37 1/3 innings pitched across 33 appearances.

Mateo broke a save record with 21 saves in the 2014–2015 season with the Estrellas Orientales.

=== San Diego Padres ===
On January 8, 2015, Mateo signed a minor league contract with the San Diego Padres organization. He was assigned to the Triple-A El Paso Chihuahuas to begin the year. On June 24, the Padres selected Mateo's contract, adding him to their active roster. In 26 appearances for San Diego, he compiled a 1–1 record and 4.00 ERA with 33 strikeouts over 27 innings of work. On December 24, the Padres released Mateo to allow him to pursue an opportunity in Japan.

=== Hanshin Tigers ===
On December 22, 2015, Mateo agreed to sign with the Hanshin Tigers of Nippon Professional Baseball, a deal which became official following his release from the Padres organization. Mateo made 52 appearances for Hanshin during the 2016 season, posting a 1–3 record and 1.80 ERA with 56 strikeouts and 20 saves over 55 innings of work.

On November 29, 2016, Mateo signed a one-year contract extension to remain with the Tigers. He made 63 appearances out out the bullpen for Hanshin in 2017, registering a 7–4 record and 2.75 ERA with 62 strikeouts across 59 innings pitched.

In 2018, Mateo made 17 appearances for the Tigers, but struggled to an 0–1 record and 6.75 ERA with 13 strikeouts across 14 2/3 innings pitched. On October 31, 2018, Mateo was released by Hanshin.

=== Ishikawa Million Stars ===
On March 30, 2019, Mateo signed with the Ishikawa Million Stars of the Baseball Challenge League.
