= Andrew Cashner =

American baseball player (born 1986)

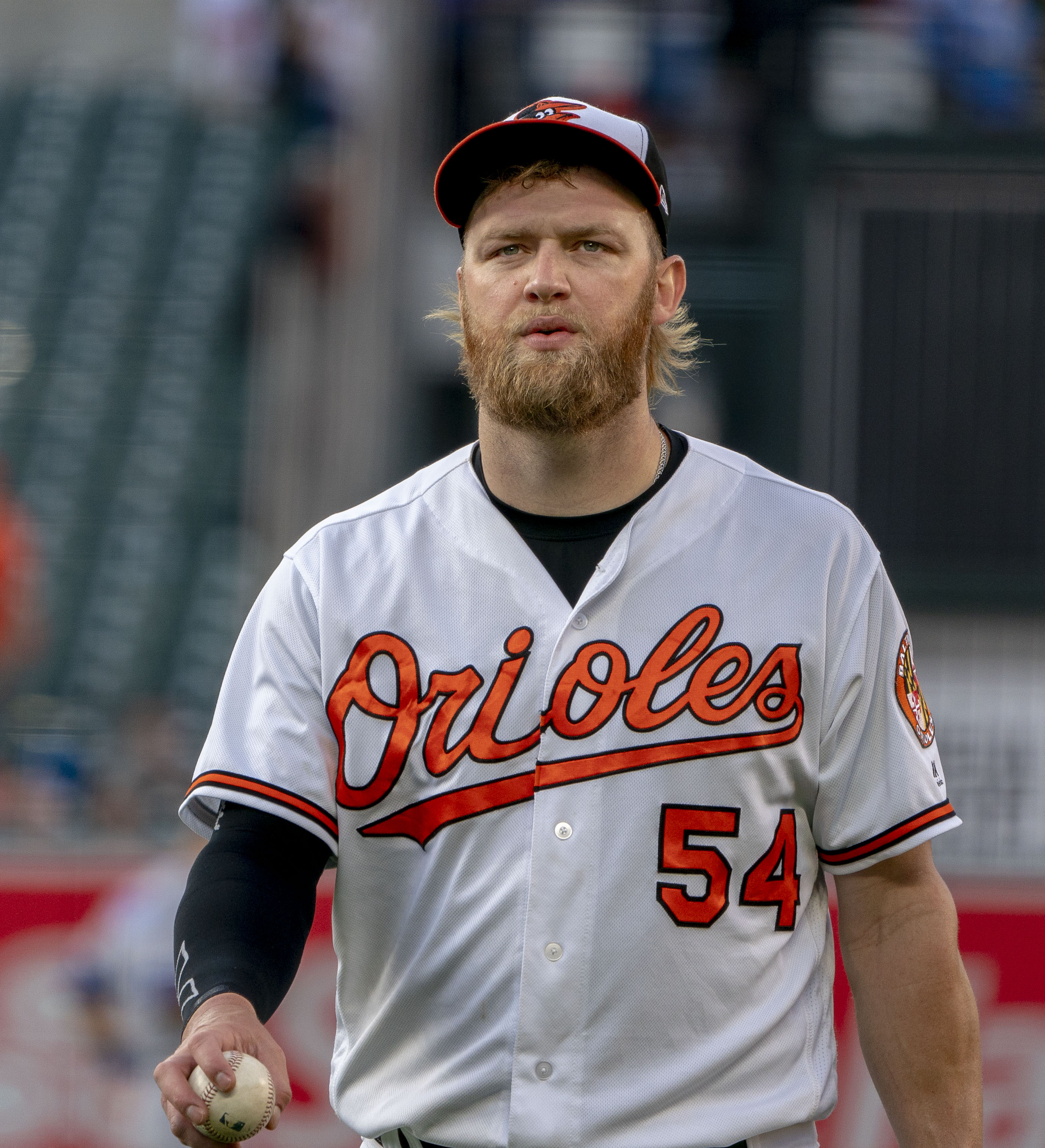
- Cashner with the Baltimore Orioles in 2018
- Pitcher
- Born: September 11, 1986 (age 40); Conroe, Texas, U.S.
- Batted: Right Threw: Right

MLB debut
- May 31, 2010, for the Chicago Cubs

Last MLB appearance
- September 28, 2019, for the Boston Red Sox

MLB statistics
- Win–loss record: 57–87
- Earned run average: 4.10
- Strikeouts: 901
- Stats at Baseball Reference

Teams
- Chicago Cubs (2010–2011); San Diego Padres (2012–2016); Miami Marlins (2016); Texas Rangers (2017); Baltimore Orioles (2018–2019); Boston Red Sox (2019)

Andrew Burton Cashner (born September 11, 1986) is an American former professional baseball pitcher. He played in Major League Baseball (MLB) for the Chicago Cubs, San Diego Padres, Miami Marlins, Texas Rangers, Baltimore Orioles, and Boston Red Sox.

== Early life and education ==
Cashner was born and raised in Conroe, Texas. His father, Jeff, runs a family mortuary business while his mother, Jane, is a seamstress. The second of three children, he grew up on a 15-acre (6.1 ha) ranch where he became an expert at horseback riding and calf roping, and was involved in the local 4-H and Future Farmers of America youth organizations. He began playing baseball during his childhood, practicing with his brother and mother on a regulation-size baseball diamond which his parents constructed on their property.

He graduated from Conroe High School in 2005 and was drafted by the Atlanta Braves, but decided to attend college instead. He attended Angelina College and Texas Christian University. Cashner pursued a degree in communications at TCU. He was drafted in college by the Colorado Rockies and Chicago Cubs, but only accepted the latter team's second offer when they made him a first-round draft pick.

== Minor league career ==
Cashner was drafted by the Chicago Cubs in the first round, 19th overall, in the 2008 Major League Baseball draft out of Texas Christian University. He was rated the Cubs fourth-best prospect prior to the 2010 season by Baseball America. Throughout three minor league seasons in the Cubs organization Cashner only gave up three home runs.

== Major League career ==
=== Chicago Cubs ===
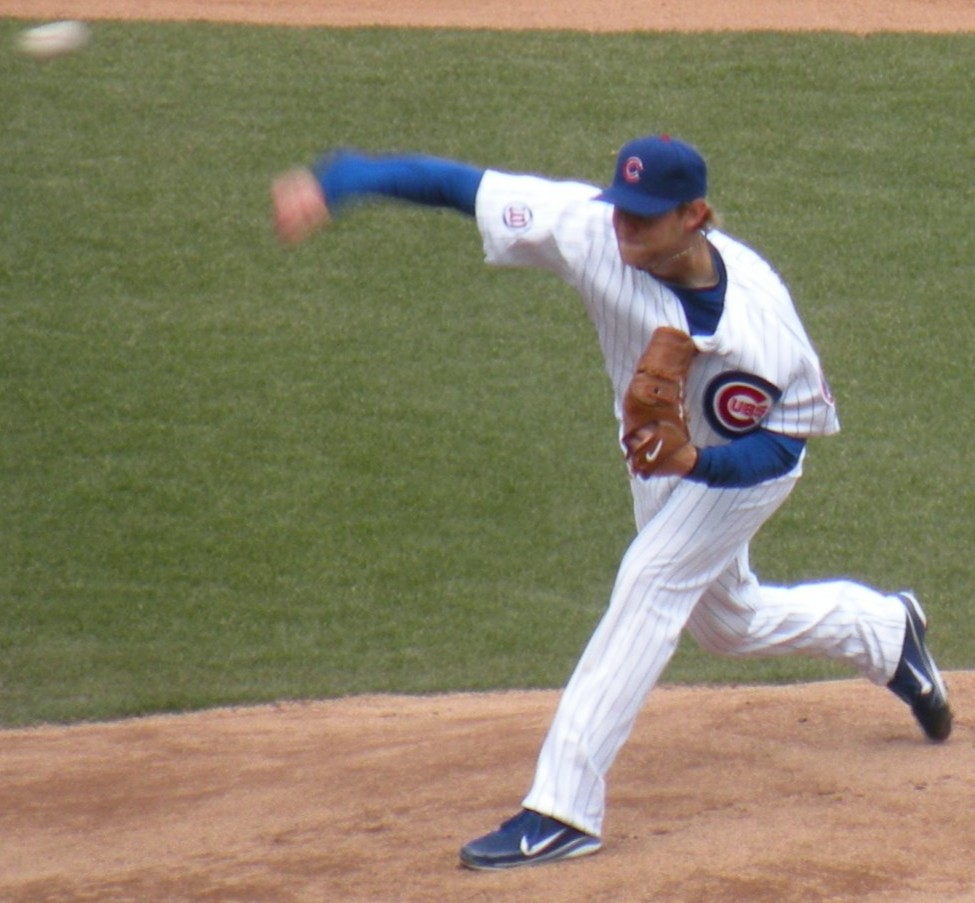
Cashner pitching for the Chicago Cubs in 2010

Cashner was called up to the majors for the first time on May 31, 2010. He made his major league debut that day. In the 2010 season, Cashner appeared in 53 games as a relief pitcher.

On March 26, 2011, Cashner was named the Cubs' 5th starter. However, Cashner only made one start for the team before being forced out with a rotator cuff injury. After a rehab stint in the minors, Cashner returned to the Cubs in September in the role of relief pitcher.

=== San Diego Padres ===
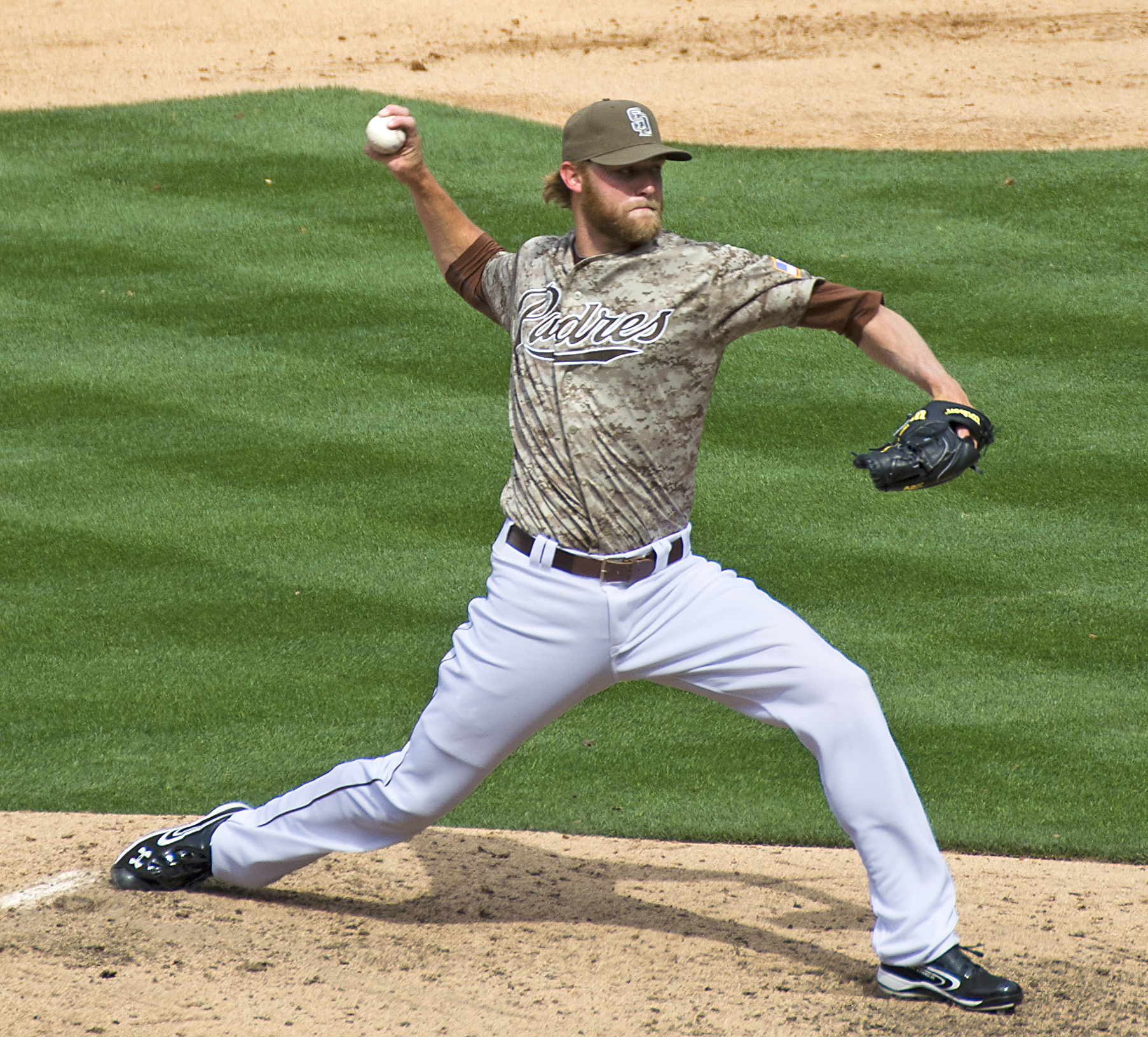
Cashner pitching for the San Diego Padres in 2012

On January 6, 2012, the San Diego Padres acquired Cashner and outfielder Kyung-Min Na from the Cubs for first baseman Anthony Rizzo and right-handed starting pitcher Zach Cates. Cashner began the season as a relief pitcher, appearing in 27 games in relief and compiling a 3.81 ERA and 29 strikeouts.

On June 9, 2012, he made a short start against the Milwaukee Brewers before being sent down to increase his arm's endurance in preparation for a starting role. He returned to the majors on June 28 to join the starting rotation after making 3 starts with the AA San Antonio Missions. In his second full-fledged start with the Padres, he strained his right latissimus dorsi muscle while warming up for the third inning and was placed on the disabled list. Cashner returned to the starting lineup September 7, but was shut down again after two starts with an injured tendon. Cashner's fastball was down by 5-8 mph after his return from the disabled list. Cashner finished the season with a 3–4 record and 4.27 ERA with 52 strike-outs in 46 1/3 innings.

In the off-season, Cashner cut the thumb on his pitching hand in a hunting accident. The injury delayed Cashner's preparation for 2013, but by the end of April he was part of the Padres' starting rotation after beginning the season in the bullpen.

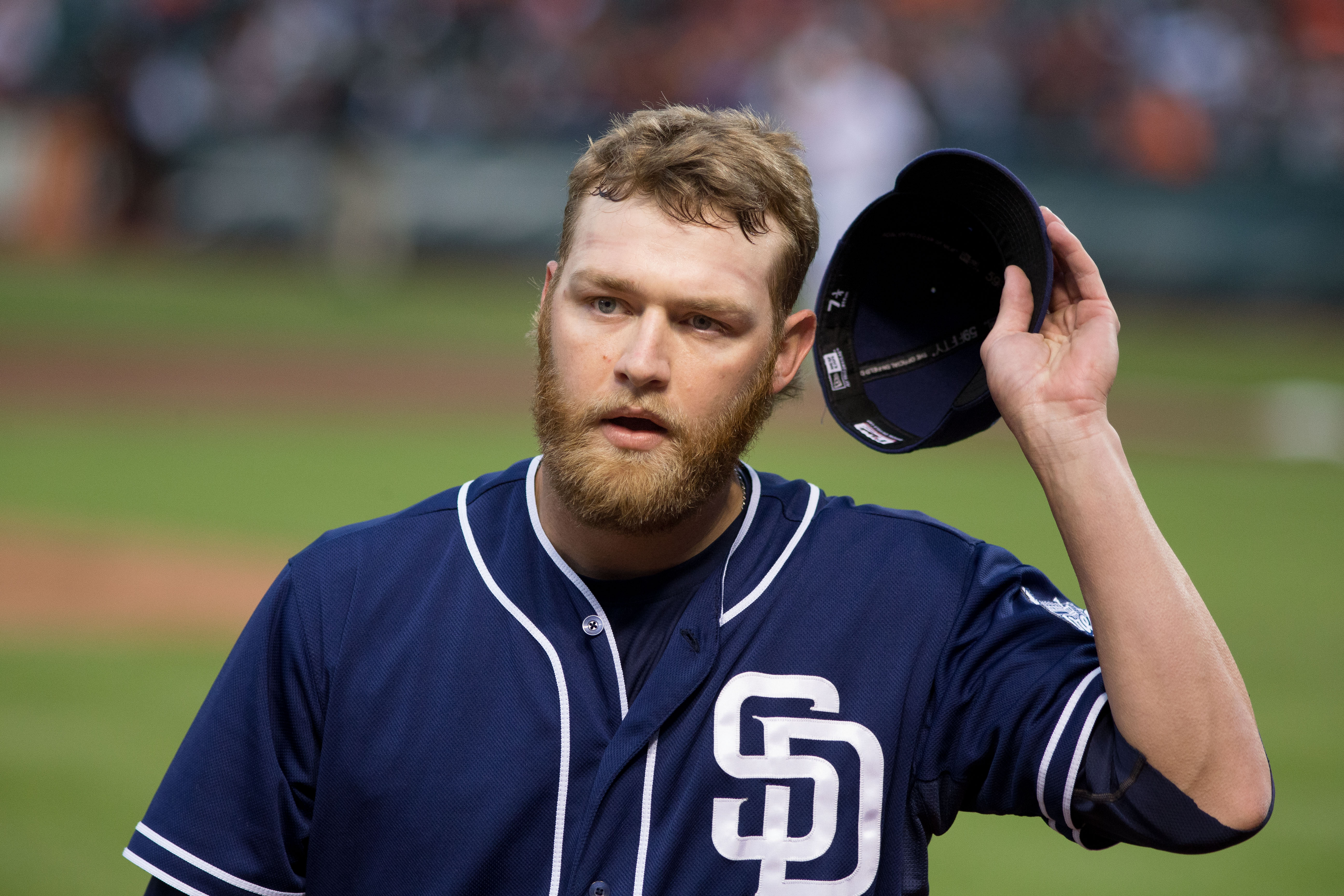
Cashner with the San Diego Padres in 2013

On July 27, 2013, Cashner hit his first career home run off of Arizona Diamondbacks pitcher Josh Collmenter. On September 16, Cashner pitched a one-hit complete-game shutout against the Pittsburgh Pirates in which he faced the minimum 27 batters. The Pirates' lone hit was a single to right field by Jose Tabata leading off the seventh inning. Tabata was forced out when Andrew McCutchen hit into a double play to end the inning. Cashner threw 97 pitches, struck out 7 and did not walk a batter. The Padres won the game 2–0. Cashner got better as the season progressed, posting a 2.14 ERA in 11 starts in the second half while raising his strike-out rate.

Cashner finished the 2013 season with a 10–9 record and a 3.09 ERA with 128 strikeouts in 175 innings pitched; the Padres imposed an innings limit on him that season. He was the unanimous winner of the Clyde McCullough Pitcher of the Year Award, awarded to the Padres top pitcher by the San Diego chapter of the Baseball Writers' Association of America.

In 2014, Cashner struggled with injuries and a lack of run support. He missed about three months of the season with elbow, shoulder, and neck injuries and was winless for 11 straight starts despite a 2.86 ERA in that stretch. Cashner pitched his second career one-hit shutout on April 11 against the Detroit Tigers. He threw 108 pitches and struck out a then career-high 11 batters as the Padres won 6–0. This game came only four regular season starts after Cashner's first one-hitter. On April 24, Cashner played left field for one at bat after Seth Smith suffered an injury in an extra inning game versus the Washington Nationals. The Padres would go on to win the game 4–3 in 12 innings. He finished the season with a record of 5–7 in 19 starts and an ERA of 2.55.

In 2015, he was 6–16 with a 4.34 ERA. He had the lowest left on base percentage of all major league pitchers, stranding only 65.6% of base runners.

In 2016, Cashner began in the rotation before being traded midseason. For the Padres, he was 4–7 in 79 1/3 innings.

=== Miami Marlins ===
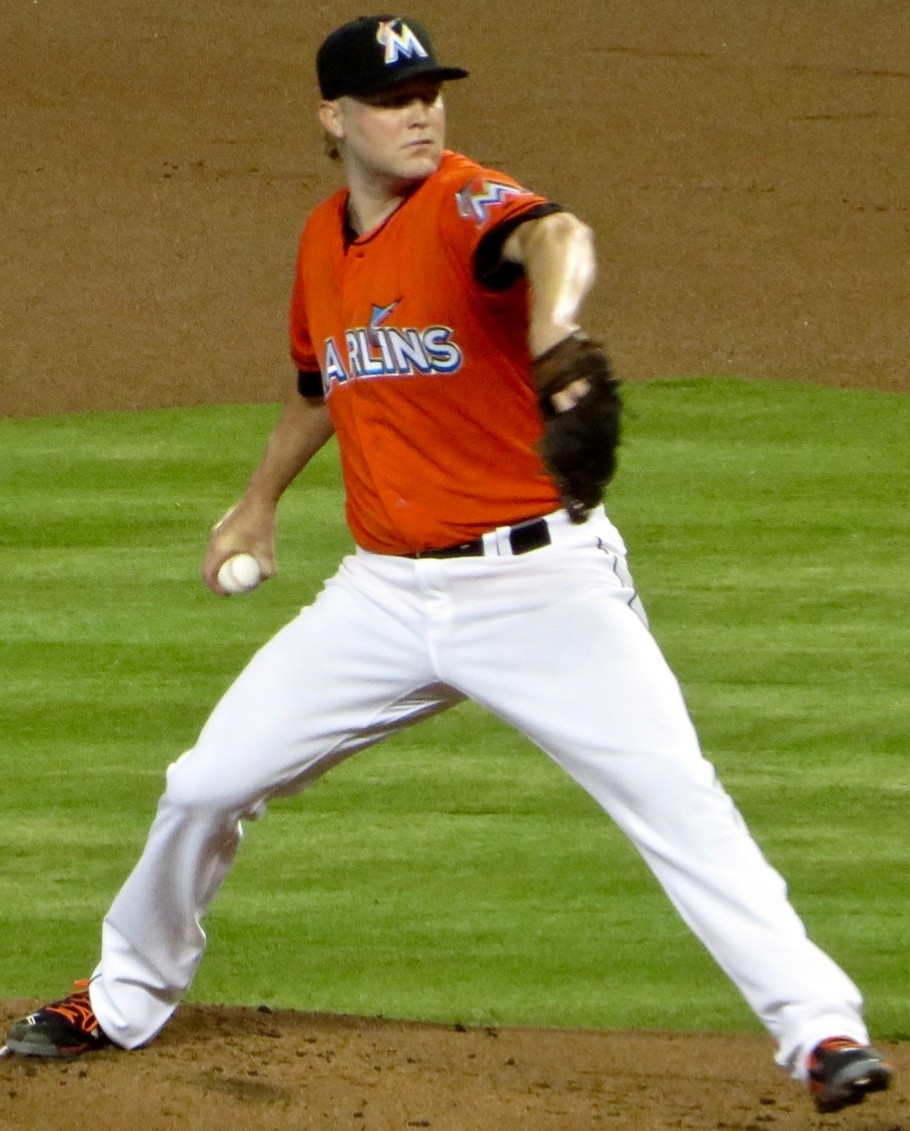
Cashner pitching for the Miami Marlins in 2016

On July 29, 2016, the Padres traded Cashner, Colin Rea, and Tayron Guerrero to the Miami Marlins for Jarred Cosart, Carter Capps, Josh Naylor, and Luis Castillo. Cashner would struggle after being acquired by Miami, going 1–4 with a 5.98 ERA in 52 2/3 innings.

=== Texas Rangers ===
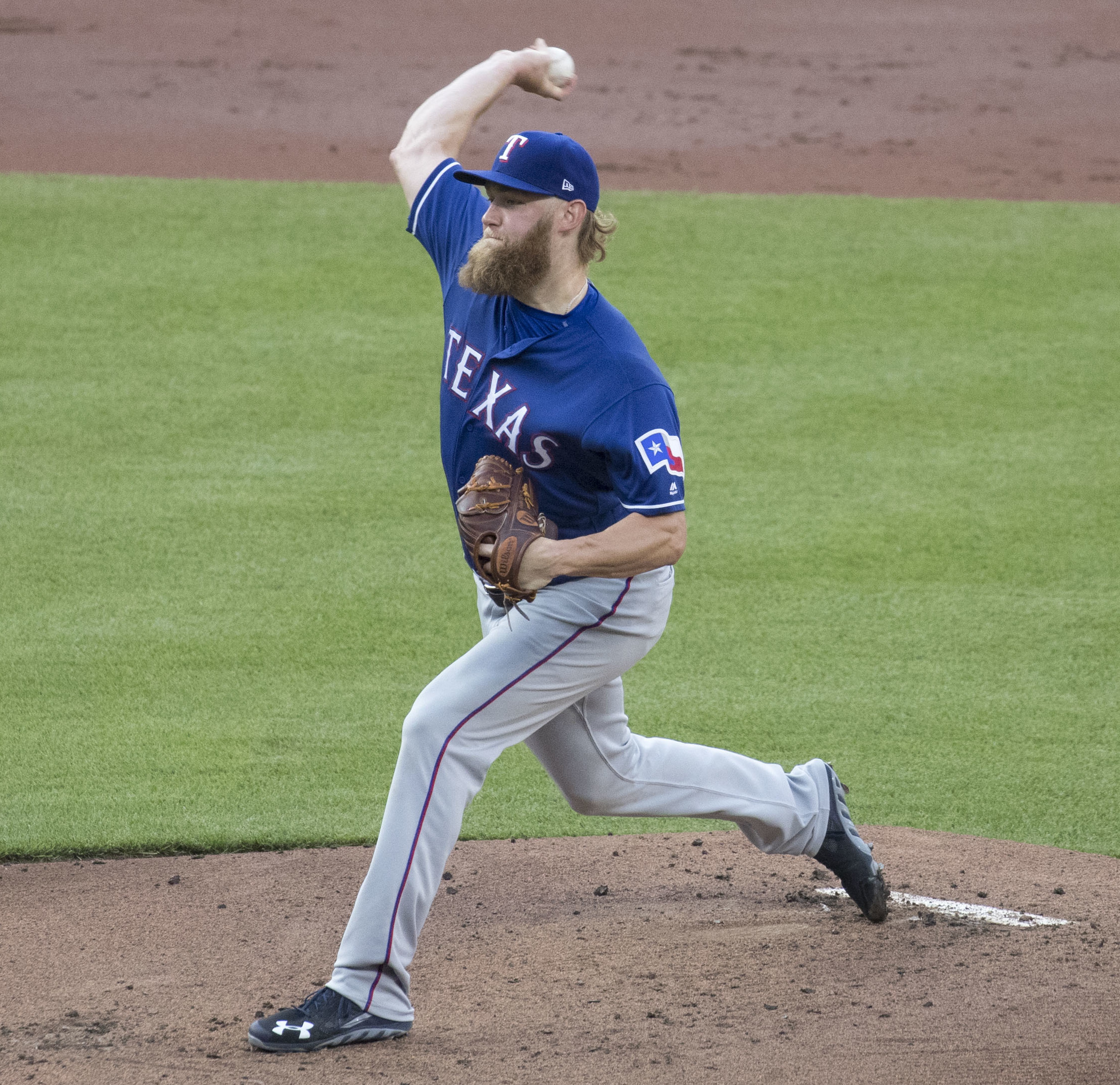
Cashner pitching for the Texas Rangers in 2017

Cashner signed a one-year, $10 million contract with the Texas Rangers on November 21, 2016. He rebounded from the previous couple of seasons to post his strongest season of his career. He finished the season 11–11 with a 3.40 ERA in 166 2/3 innings despite posting a K/BB ratio of 1.34 (86 Ks, 64 BBs). He led major league pitchers in highest contact percentage (86.4%) of batters against him.

=== Baltimore Orioles ===
On February 15, 2018, Cashner signed a two-year, $16 million contract with the Baltimore Orioles that also contained a vesting option for a third year. On June 12, Cashner was placed on the 10-day disabled list with a lower back strain. In the first year of his two-year contract, Cashner dealt with a couple of DL stints, finishing the season with a 4–15 record in 28 starts; he struck out 99 in 153 innings. In 2019, Cashner made 19 appearances with Baltimore (all starts) through mid-July, compiling a 9–3 record with 3.83 ERA, and 66 strikeouts in 96 1/3 innings.

=== Boston Red Sox ===
On July 13, 2019, Cashner, along with cash considerations, was traded to the Boston Red Sox in exchange for minor league position players Noelberth Romero and Elio Prado. In his six starts with Boston, Cashner had a 1–4 record with 8.01 ERA in 30 1/3 innings pitched; he was then moved to a relief role, and on August 13 recorded his first MLB save. With the 2019 Red Sox, Cashner appeared in 25 games (six starts), compiling a 2–5 record with one save, along with 42 strikeouts in 53 2/3 innings. He became a free agent on October 31.

== Pitching style ==
Cashner relies mainly on a four-seam fastball that can surpass 100 miles per hour (160 km/h). The fastball averaged 99.4 miles per hour (160.0 km/h) in the first half of 2012 when he was working as a reliever and 94.8 miles per hour (152.6 km/h) in 2013 when he was primarily a starter. His secondary pitches are a change-up and slider, with an occasional sinker. According to Fangraphs, Cashner's fastball in 2013 was the fifth-fastest among major league starters. Padres catcher René Rivera said Cashner that season "learned how to be a pitcher" who can "get outs quick", as opposed to being a mere thrower.

== Philanthropy ==
Cashner, his brother, and sister established the Cashner Family Foundation, "Pitching for a Cause", which provides funding to hospitals and communities on behalf of children with medical issues. The foundation grew out of their experience watching their mother survive breast cancer in 2004 and then lose a leg after suffering septic shock in 2015.
