= Carlos Mármol =

Dominican baseball player (born 1982)

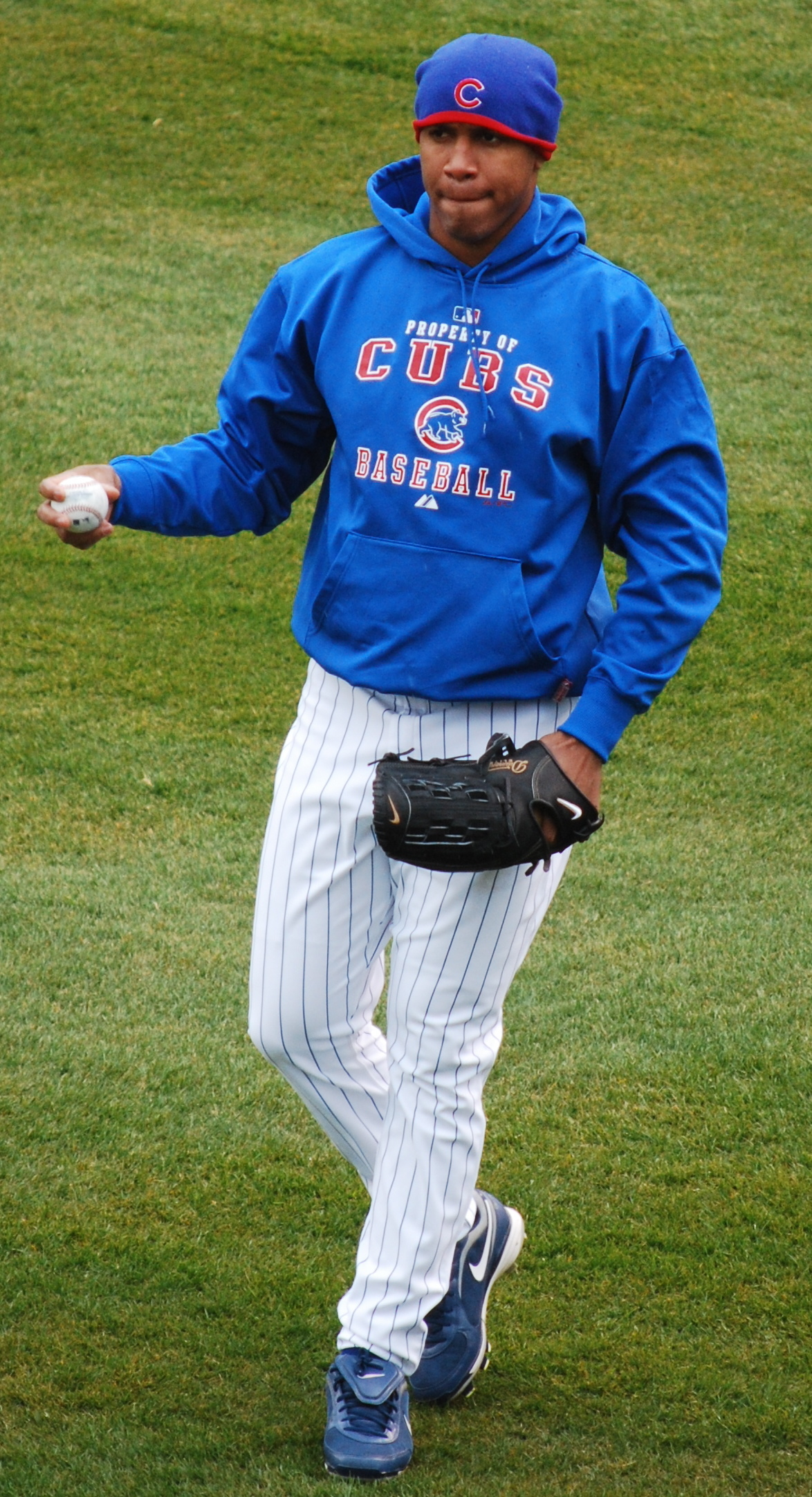
- Mármol with the Chicago Cubs in 2009
- Pitcher
- Born: October 14, 1982 (age 43); Bonao, Dominican Republic
- Batted: Right Threw: Right

MLB debut
- June 4, 2006, for the Chicago Cubs

Last MLB appearance
- May 10, 2014, for the Miami Marlins

MLB statistics
- Win–loss record: 23–35
- Earned run average: 3.57
- Strikeouts: 744
- Saves: 117
- Stats at Baseball Reference

Teams
- Chicago Cubs (2006–2013); Los Angeles Dodgers (2013); Miami Marlins (2014)

Career highlights and awards
- All-Star (2008)

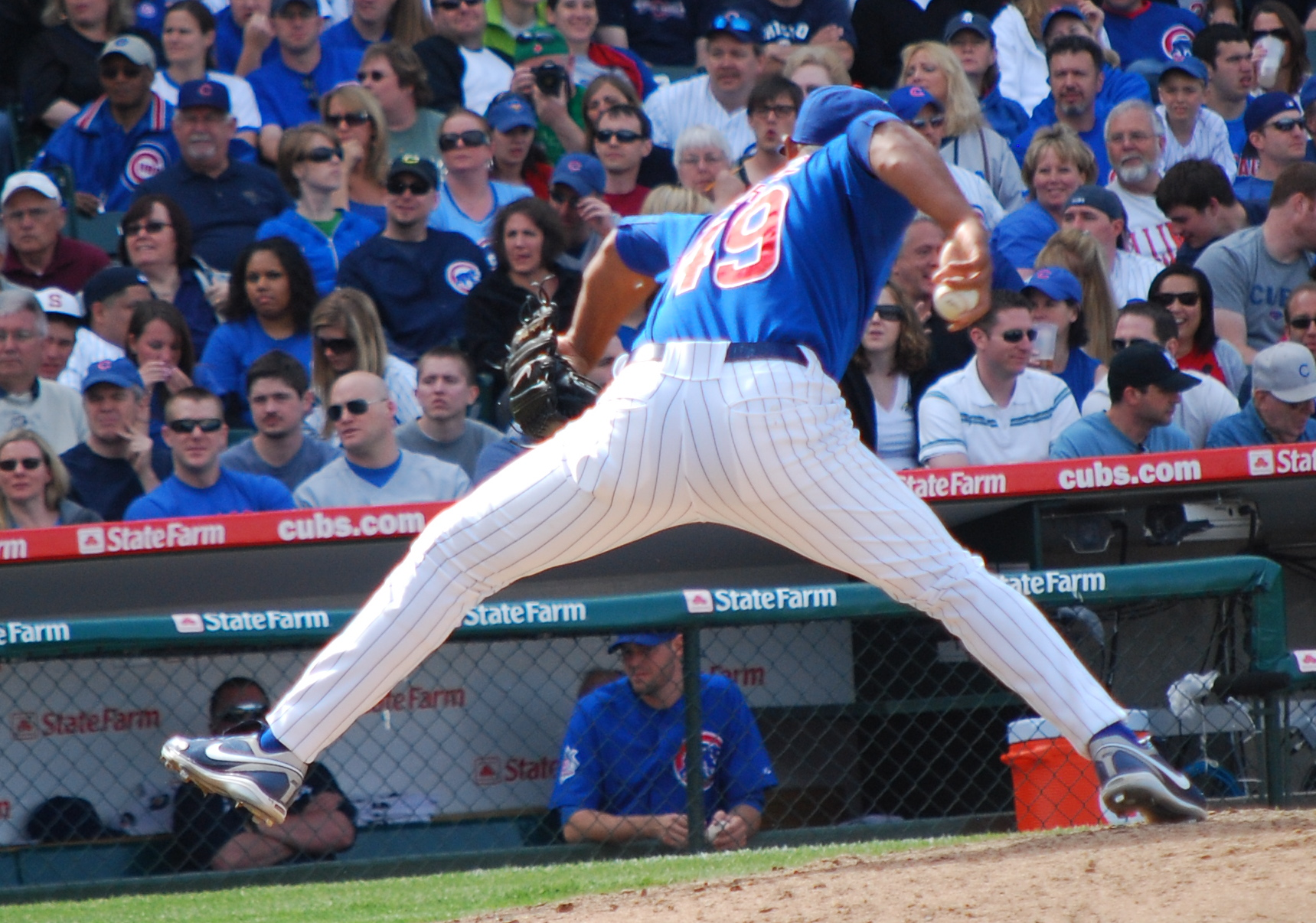
Carlos Mármol pitching for the Chicago Cubs in 2009.

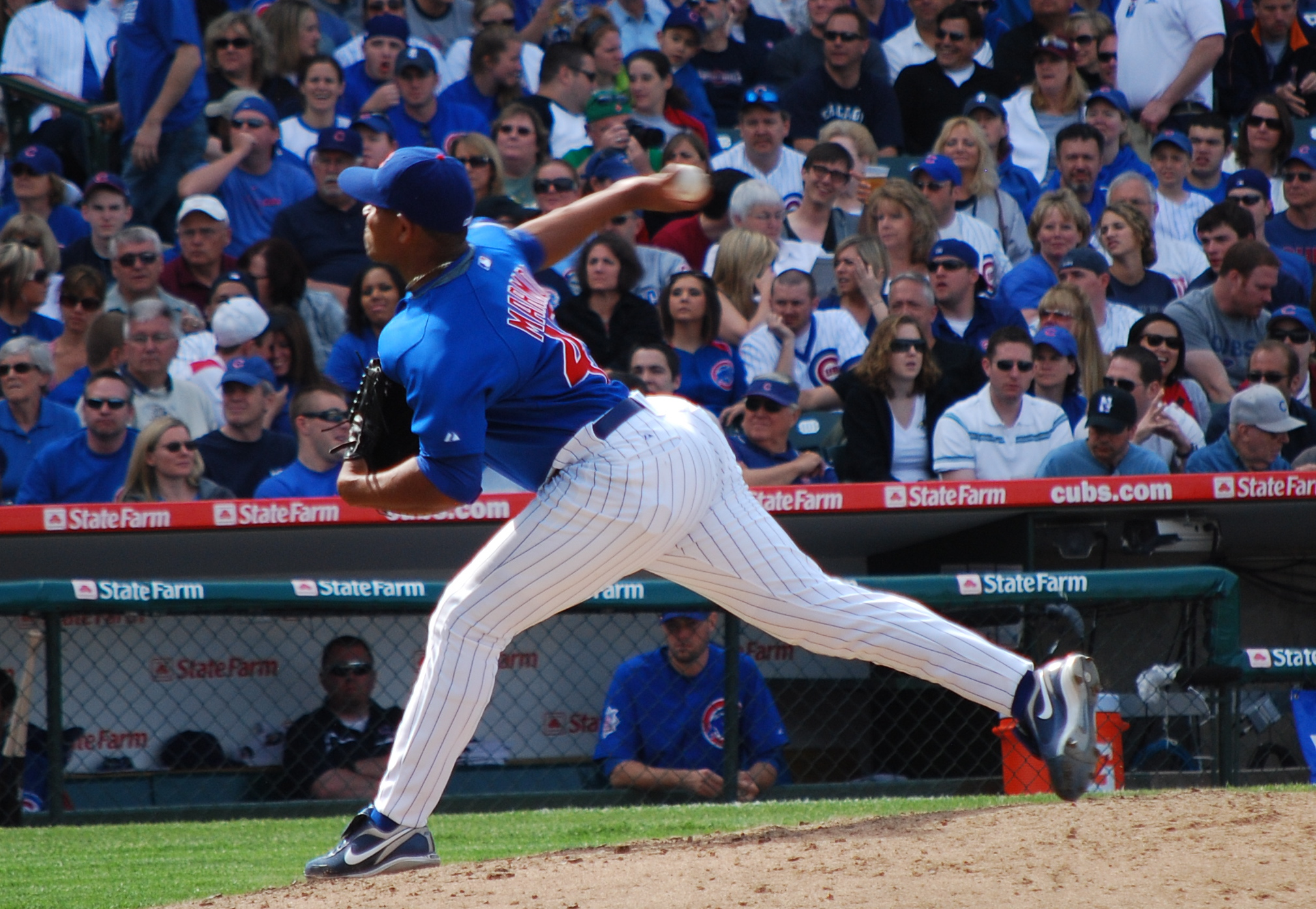

Carlos Agustín Mármol (born October 14, 1982) is a Dominican former professional baseball relief pitcher. He played in Major League Baseball (MLB) for the Chicago Cubs, Los Angeles Dodgers, and the Miami Marlins.

== Professional career ==
=== Minor leagues ===
Mármol was signed by the Chicago Cubs as an amateur free agent on July 3, 1999, as a catcher/outfielder. In his last season as a hitter, in 2002, he batted .258 with a .271 OBP for the Arizona League Cubs in the Rookie League, and .149 with a .167 OBP for the Lansing Lugnuts in the Midwest League.

After batting .273 in 14 minor league games, Mármol converted to become a pitcher. He went 26–19 with a 3.41 ERA before being added to the 40-man roster in November 2005.

=== Chicago Cubs ===
==== 2006 ====
Mármol made his Major League debut on June 4, 2006, against the St. Louis Cardinals in a relief appearance. He pitched two scoreless innings and gave up one hit while striking out three.

After Cubs pitcher Kerry Wood was placed on the disabled list for the second time of the season, Mármol was called on to make a spot start. He was one of seven rookies to make a start for the 2006 Cubs. On June 11, against the Cincinnati Reds, in his first Major League start he allowed just one run on two hits while striking out seven, to earn the win.

He went on to make 19 appearances and 13 starts in the 2006 season with a 5–7 record. He posted a 6.08 ERA in 77 innings, and walked 6.9 batters per 9 innings.

==== 2007 ====
Mármol returned to the Major Leagues in 2007 as a relief pitcher for the Cubs. Due to an injury to closer Ryan Dempster, Mármol was called upon to pitch in the ninth inning of a game against the Colorado Rockies on June 27, 2007. He pitched a scoreless frame, recording two strikeouts, for his first Major League save.

In his second season, he flourished in the bullpen as a setup man and finished the season with a stellar ERA of 1.43 and struck out 96 batters in 69.1 innings. His ERA was good enough for third in the Major Leagues among relievers, behind only Seattle Mariners closer J. J. Putz and Los Angeles Dodgers closer Takashi Saito. He received one 10th place vote and came in 26th in the MVP award voting.

==== 2008 ====
Entering the 2008 season, Mármol was in a tight battle for the closer spot that was now vacant with former closer Dempster having moved to the starting rotation. He competed with Kerry Wood and Bob Howry for the spot, and while both he and Wood had solid numbers in the spring, manager Lou Piniella opted for the veteran Wood to close and kept Mármol in the setup role he excelled at in 2007. With Wood suffering from a blister, Mármol was selected to replace him at the All-Star Game, and pitched a scoreless 13th inning of relief in an eventual 15-inning National League loss.

==== 2009 ====
Mármol competed with Kevin Gregg for the closer's role in 2009 after the departure of Wood before the 2009 MLB season, but lost the role to Gregg.

In spring training in 2009 he led all pitchers in hit batsmen, with 5 (in 10.1 innings). As of August 18, 2009, he was leading all NL pitchers in hbp in the regular season, with 11 (in 56.1 innings), and his 52 walks averaged over 8 walks per 9 innings.

However, after a series of disappointing appearances by Gregg in August, and after Gregg allowed 12 homers in 56 1/3 innings (the most in the majors for a reliever), Piniella announced on August 18 that Mármol would replace Gregg as closer.

==== 2010 ====
Mármol won the Delivery Man of the Month Award for September 2010. He finished the 2010 campaign with 16.0 strikeouts averaged per nine innings (138 in 77 2/3 innings), breaking the record for highest K/9 ratio by a pitcher with at least 50 innings pitched, previously held by Éric Gagné's 14.9 mark over his 2003 season. His 138 K's are a franchise record for a relief pitcher.

==== 2011 ====
In 2011, Mármol led the National League and tied for the Major League lead in blown saves (with Jordan Walden) with 10.

==== 2013 ====
On June 25, 2013, Marmol was designated for assignment by the Cubs after recording a 5.86 ERA in 31 appearances during the season.

=== Los Angeles Dodgers ===
On July 2, 2013, he was traded to the Los Angeles Dodgers for reliever Matt Guerrier. The Dodgers promptly outrighted him to the minor leagues, where he made 3 appearances for Class A Rancho Cucamonga and 2 for AA Chattanooga. The Dodgers recalled him to the Majors on July 23. In 21 appearances for the Dodgers he had an ERA of 2.53.

=== Miami Marlins ===
On February 6, 2014, Marmol agreed to a one-year contract with the Miami Marlins worth $1.25 million. In 15 appearances, he recorded an 8.10 ERA in 13 1/3 innings, while striking out 14 batters and walking 10. He was designated for assignment on May 11, 2014. On May 19, the Marlins officially released Marmol.

=== Cincinnati Reds ===
On May 27, 2014, Mármol signed a minor league deal with the Cincinnati Reds. He was released on November 17, 2014, after only pitching in 3 games in Louisville.

=== Cleveland Indians ===
On May 8, 2015, Mármol signed a minor league contract with the Cleveland Indians.

=== Boston Red Sox ===
On February 16, 2016, Mármol signed a minor league contract with the Boston Red Sox, with an invitation to spring training. On March 28, 2016, Mármol was released by the Red Sox.

== International career ==
He has played in the World Baseball Classic for the Dominican Republic.

== Pitching style ==
Mármol is known for two quality pitches, a four-seam fastball (91–94 mph, although when he was younger this was often several mph faster), and a sweeping slider (81–84). When Mármol pitched well, he became nearly unhittable, as evidenced by career rates of 5.7 hits and 11.7 strikeouts per 9 innings. However, Mármol has also at times been plagued by serious control problems. In 2009, he was third in the entire National League in hit batsmen (12) despite only pitching 74 innings. He had also walked more batters than he has allowed hits in his career. Mármol's control issues and an over-reliance on his slider — despite manager Dale Sveum's advice to throw his fastball more often — led to Sveum removing him from the closer role in May 2012.
