= Mitch Atkins =

American baseball player (born 1985)

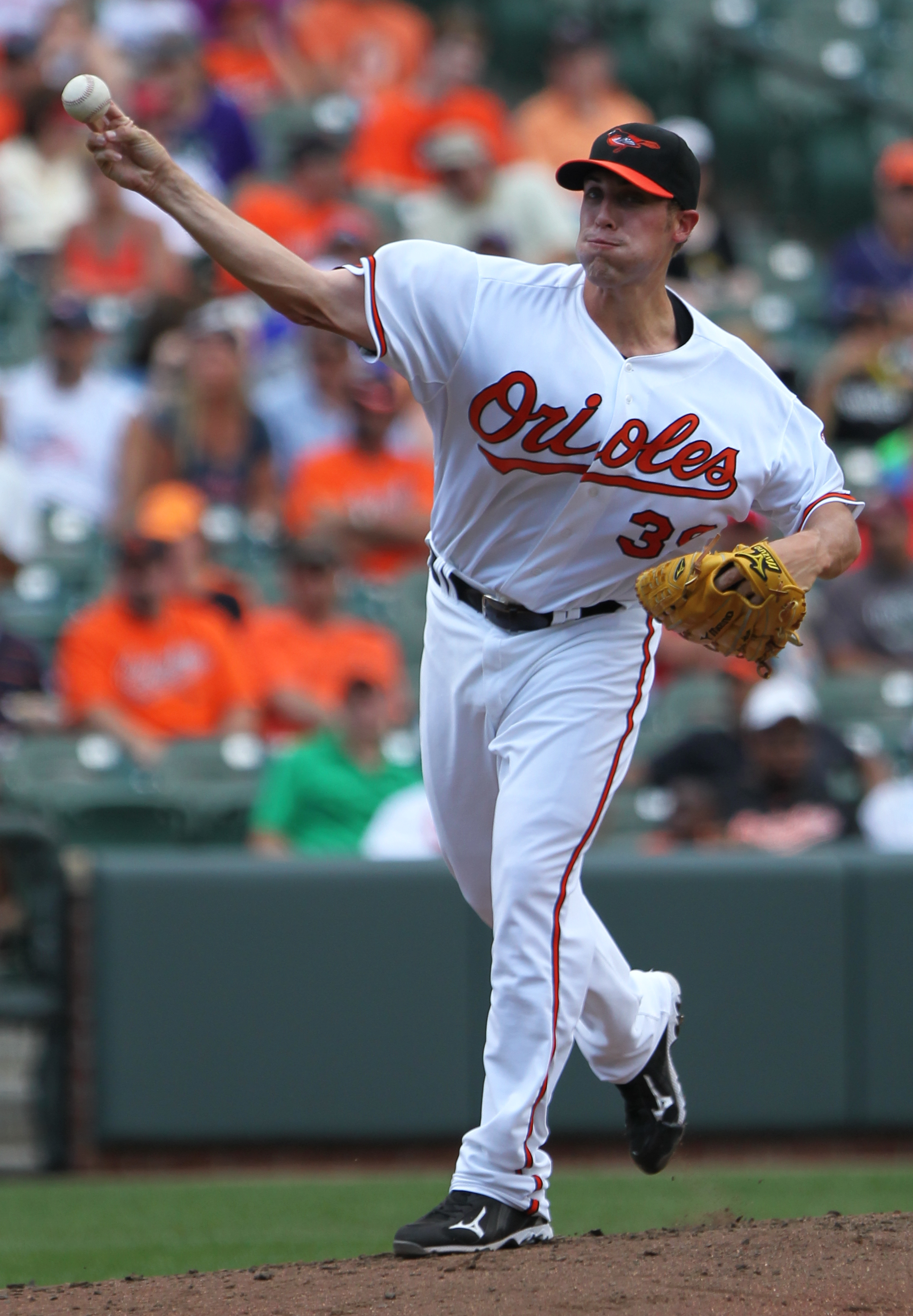
- Atkins with the Baltimore Orioles
- Pitcher
- Born: October 1, 1985 (age 40); Browns Summit, North Carolina, U.S.
- Batted: Right Threw: Right

Professional debut
- MLB: July 29, 2009, for the Chicago Cubs
- CPBL: May 26, 2015, for the Lamigo Monkeys

Last appearance
- MLB: July 17, 2011, for the Baltimore Orioles
- CPBL: September 28, 2015, for the Lamigo Monkeys

MLB statistics
- Win–loss record: 0–0
- Earned run average: 6.75
- Strikeouts: 17

CPBL statistics
- Win–loss record: 8-7
- Earned run average: 4.53
- Strikeouts: 88
- Stats at Baseball Reference

Teams
- Chicago Cubs (2009–2010); Baltimore Orioles (2011); Lamigo Monkeys (2015)

Career highlights and awards
- Taiwan Series champion (2015)

Mitchell Shane Atkins (born October 1, 1985) is an American former professional baseball pitcher. He has previously played in Major League Baseball (MLB) for the Chicago Cubs and Baltimore Orioles, and in the Chinese Professional Baseball League (CPBL) for the Lamigo Monkeys.

Atkins played high school baseball at Northeast Guilford High School in McLeansville, North Carolina. He originally committed to Elon University, but was drafted by the Cubs as the 216th overall pick in the seventh round of the 2004 MLB draft.

== Professional career ==
=== Chicago Cubs ===
Atkins was drafted by the Chicago Cubs in the 7th round, 216th overall, of the 2004 Major League Baseball draft. After signing, Atkins made his professional debut for the AZL Cubs. In 2005, he played for the Low-A Boise Hawks, recording a 3–6 record and 5.03 ERA in 15 appearances. He spent the 2006 season with the Single-A Peoria Chiefs, registering a 13–4 record and 2.41 ERA with 127 strikeouts in 25 games. He split the 2007 season between the Double-A Tennessee Smokies and the High-A Daytona Cubs, accumulating a 9–8 record and 3.57 ERA in 141.0 innings of work. In 2008, Atkins split the year between Tennessee and the Triple-A Iowa Cubs, pitching to a 17–7 record and 4.00 ERA with 132 strikeouts in 28 games. He began the 2009 season in Iowa.

In his minor league career, Atkins was twice named the Pacific Coast League Pitcher of the Week and also was a Southern League All-Star (2008), Florida State League All-Star (2007), and a Midwest League All-Star (2006). He was believed to be the first MLB player from Guilford County NC schools since 1964.

He made his Major League debut on July 29, 2009, against the Houston Astros. Atkins pitched two games during late July 2009, allowing no runs, but would not see a big league mound again until July 9, 2010, when he pitched a 1.1 innings in Los Angeles. On September 21, 2010, Atkins was designated for assignment by the Cubs after recording a 6.30 ERA in 5 games. On November 6, 2010, Atkins elected free agency.

=== Baltimore Orioles ===
On November 15, 2010, Atkins signed a minor league contract with the Baltimore Orioles organization. On July 5, 2011, Atkins was selected to the active roster and made his first major league start in a loss against the Texas Rangers. After struggling to an 8.44 ERA in 3 games, on August 31, 2011, Atkins was outrighted off of the 40-man roster and was assigned to the Triple-A Norfolk Tides.

=== Washington Nationals ===
He signed a minor league contract with the Washington Nationals on February 9, 2012. He spent the season with the Triple-A Syracuse Chiefs, recording a 6–9 record and 4.87 ERA. He elected free agency on November 2.

=== Atlanta Braves ===
After a short stint with the Somerset Patriots of the Atlantic League of Professional Baseball, on June 3, 2013, the Atlanta Braves signed Atkins to a minor league deal. He spent the rest of the season with the Double–A Mississippi Braves.

=== Texas Rangers ===
On December 31, 2014, he signed a minor league contract with the Texas Rangers. He was released on March 31, 2015.

=== Lamigo Monkeys ===
Atkins signed to pitch for the Somerset Patriots of the Atlantic League of Professional Baseball but a few days before the season started he left the team and signed with the Lamigo Monkeys of the Chinese Professional Baseball League instead. Atkins won the Taiwan Series with the Monkeys in 2015, pitching to a 8–7 record and 4.53 ERA in the regular season.

=== Boston Red Sox ===
On February 22, 2016, he signed a minor league contract with the Boston Red Sox, and played for their affiliate teams Pawtucket Red Sox, Portland Sea Dogs and Lowell Spinners. He led the Eastern League in strikeouts, with 145, and elected free agency on November 7, 2016.

=== Somerset Patriots ===
On March 28, 2017, Atkins signed a 1-year contract with the Somerset Patriots of the Atlantic League of Professional Baseball.

=== New York Mets ===
On June 22, 2017, Atkins signed a minor league deal with the New York Mets organization. He made 14 starts for the Triple–A Las Vegas 51s, posting a 4–8 record and 5.65 ERA with 57 strikeouts in 78.0 innings pitched. Atkins elected free agency following the season on November 6.

=== York Revolution ===
On April 11, 2018, Atkins signed with the York Revolution of the Atlantic League of Professional Baseball. He registered a 12–7 record and 4.17 ERA in 25 games for York in 2018. Atkins re-signed with the team for the 2019 season. He pitched to an 11–6 record and 2.81 ERA for York in 2019 and became a free agent following the season.

=== Sultanes de Monterrey ===
Atkins played for the Sultanes de Monterrey of the Mexican Pacific League for the 2019-20 winter season. He later signed with their counterpart team in the Mexican Baseball League (LMB) for the 2020 season. Atkins did not play in a game in 2020 due to the cancellation of the Mexican League season because of the COVID-19 pandemic.

=== High Point Rockers ===
On May 6, 2021, Atkins signed with the High Point Rockers of the Atlantic League of Professional Baseball.

=== Sultanes de Monterrey (second stint) ===
On June 18, 2021, Atkins's contract was purchased by the Sultanes de Monterrey of the Mexican League. He was released on July 11, 2021.

=== High Point Rockers (second stint) ===
On August 1, 2021, Atkins re-signed with the High Point Rockers of the Atlantic League of Professional Baseball. He made 8 total starts for the team, registering a 4.37 ERA with 30 strikeouts in 35.0 innings pitched. He became a free agent following the season.

On August 11, 2022, Atkins re-signed with the High Point Rockers. In 6 starts for the team, he logged a 3–0 record and 4.91 ERA with 18 strikeouts across 25 2/3 innings of work. Atkins became a free agent again following the season.

On July 14, 2023, Atkins once more re–signed with the Rockers. In 7 games (6 starts), he struggled to a 1–4 record and 8.13 ERA with 23 strikeouts across 27 2/3 innings pitched.

On April 15, 2024, Atkins re–signed with High Point for a fourth consecutive year. However, he was released by the team prior to the season on April 23.
