= Randy Wells =

American baseball player (born 1982)

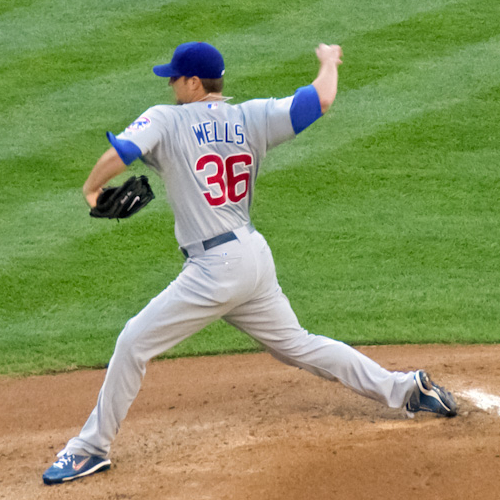
- Wells with the Chicago Cubs
- Pitcher
- Born: August 28, 1982 (age 43); Belleville, Illinois, U.S.
- Batted: Right Threw: Right

MLB debut
- April 5, 2008, for the Toronto Blue Jays

Last MLB appearance
- June 26, 2012, for the Chicago Cubs

MLB statistics
- Win–loss record: 28–32
- Earned run average: 4.08
- Strikeouts: 345
- Stats at Baseball Reference

Teams
- Toronto Blue Jays (2008); Chicago Cubs (2008–2012)

Randy David Wells (born August 28, 1982) is an American former professional baseball pitcher. He played in Major League Baseball (MLB) for the Toronto Blue Jays and Chicago Cubs.

== Professional career ==
Wells was drafted by the Chicago Cubs in the 38th round (1,143rd overall) of the 2002 MLB draft as a catcher. He spent his career in the Cubs farm system from 2003 to 2007 before being claimed in the Rule 5 Draft by the Toronto Blue Jays before the 2008 season. Wells made the opening day roster and made his debut on April 5, 2008, against the Boston Red Sox and pitched a scoreless inning. It was his only appearance for the Blue Jays because he was designated for assignment on April 9, 2008. Wells was returned to the Cubs organization on April 16, and was assigned to the Triple-A Iowa Cubs. On September 9, 2008, the Cubs placed Jon Lieber on the 60-day DL and called up Wells to replace him on the roster. After spring training in 2009, he was returned to the Iowa Cubs. Wells was called up to the Cubs active roster on May 5, 2009 in place of the injured Carlos Zambrano. He made his first start on May 8 against the Milwaukee Brewers and struck out five batters in five scoreless innings, but despite leaving the game with a 2–0 lead, the Cubs' bullpen gave up three runs and eventually lost 3–2. Wells got his first Major League win on June 21, 2009 in a 6–2 win over a struggling and injury plagued Cleveland Indians. On July 29, he became the first Cub rookie pitcher to win seven games since Kerry Wood did it in 1998, when he threw eight shutout innings in a 12–0 Cubs win over the last place Astros. Wells finished 6th in the National League Rookie of the Year voting.

Randy wrestled with forearm soreness early in 2011, but says his year turned around when teammate Ryan Dempster admonished him in July, "You're a good pitcher. [Stop] feeling sorry for yourself because your arm's been bothering you, and go out there and pitch like you know you can pitch." So he did: The result was five straight wins, including a two-hit shutout.

Wells was designated for assignment by the Cubs on June 27, 2012. At the time, he was 1–2 with a 5.34 ERA in 12 games (four starts). On October 6, Wells elected free agency.

On December 6, 2012, Wells signed a minor league contract with the Texas Rangers organization. On April 30, 2013, he announced his retirement from professional baseball.
