= 2009 Chicago Cubs season =

2009 Chicago Cubs
- League: National League
- Division: Central
- Ballpark: Wrigley Field
- City: Chicago
- Record: 83–78 (.516)
- Divisional place: 2nd
- Owners: Tribune Company
- General managers: Jim Hendry
- Managers: Lou Piniella
- Television: WGN-TV; WGN America; CSN Chicago; CSN Chicago Plus; WCIU-TV (Len Kasper, Bob Brenly)
- Radio: WGN (AM); Chicago Cubs Radio Network (Pat Hughes, Ron Santo, Judd Sirott)

The 2009 Chicago Cubs season was the 138th season of the Chicago Cubs franchise, the 134th in the National League and the 94th at Wrigley Field. The Cubs, attempting to win the National League Central for the third consecutive season, fell short by finishing in second place with a record of 83–78.

== Minor League affiliates ==
In 2009 The Chicago Cubs had three minor league affiliates. The team's Single-A affiliate is the Peoria Chiefs, located in Peoria. The Chicago Cubs' Double-A affiliate is the Tennessee Smokies based in the Knoxville, Tennessee metropolitan area. Finally the Chicago Cubs Triple-A Affiliate is the Iowa Cubs, located in Iowa. The Iowa Cubs were coached by former Cub and Hall of Fame player Ryne Sandberg in 2009. Sandberg previously coached the Chiefs and Smokies as well.

== Regular season ==
=== Season standings ===
NL Central
Team	W	L	Pct.	GB	Home	Road
St. Louis Cardinals	91	71	.562	—	46‍–‍35	45‍–‍36
Chicago Cubs	83	78	.516	7½	46‍–‍34	37‍–‍44
Milwaukee Brewers	80	82	.494	11	40‍–‍41	40‍–‍41
Cincinnati Reds	78	84	.481	13	40‍–‍41	38‍–‍43
Houston Astros	74	88	.457	17	44‍–‍37	30‍–‍51
Pittsburgh Pirates	62	99	.385	28½	40‍–‍41	22‍–‍58

=== Record vs. opponents ===
2009 National League record Source: MLB Standings Grid – 2009
Team	AZ	ATL	CHC	CIN	COL	FLA	HOU	LAD	MIL	NYM	PHI	PIT	SD	SF	STL	WAS	AL
Arizona	–	3–4	4-2	1–5	7-11	5–3	5–4	7-11	2–5	5–2	1–5	6–1	11-7	5-13	2–4	1–5	5–10
Atlanta	4–3	–	4–2	3–6	4–4	8-10	3-3	4–3	3–3	13–5	10-8	3–4	3–3	3–4	4–2	10-8	7–8
Chicago	2-4	2–4	–	10-5	2–4	4–3	11–6	3–5	10-7	3-3	1–5	10-4	4–5	4-2	6-10	5–2	6–9
Cincinnati	5-1	6-3	5-10	–	0-7	3-3	12-4	1-5	8-7	2-4	2-5	13-5	1-6	3-3	8-8	3-4	6-9
Colorado	11-7	4-4	4-2	7-0	–	2-4	2-5	4-14	6-0	3-4	2-4	6-3	10-8	8-10	6-1	6-0	11-4
Florida	3-5	10-8	3-4	3-3	4-2	–	4–3	3-3	3-4	11-7	9-9	2-4	4-2	3-4	3-3	12-6	10-8
Houston	4–5	3-3	6-11	4-12	5-2	3-4	–	4–3	5-10	1-5	6-2	10-5	6-1	2-4	6-9	3-3	6-9
Los Angeles	11-7	3-4	5-3	5-1	14-4	3-3	3-4	–	3–3	5-1	4-3	4-3	10-8	11-7	2-5	3-2	9-9
Milwaukee	5-2	3-3	7-10	7-8	0-6	4-3	10-5	3-3	–	3-3	4-3	9-5	2-4	4-5	9-9	5-3	5-10
New York	2-5	5-13	3-3	4-2	4-3	7-11	5-1	1-5	3-3	–	6-12	4-3	2-5	5-3	4-5	10-8	5–10
Philadelphia	5-1	8-10	5-1	5-2	4-2	9-9	2-6	3-4	3-4	12-6	–	4-2	5-2	3-4	4-1	15-3	6-12
Pittsburgh	1-6	4-3	4-10	5-13	3-6	4-2	5-10	3-4	5-9	3-4	2-4	–	3-4	2-4	5-10	5-3	8–7
San Diego	7-11	3-3	5-4	6-1	8-10	2-4	1-6	8-10	4-2	5-2	2-5	4-3	–	10-8	1-6	4-2	5–10
San Francisco	13-5	4–3	2–4	3–3	10-8	4–3	4–2	7-11	5-4	3–5	4–3	4–2	8-10	–	4–3	4–2	9–6
St. Louis	4-2	2-4	10-6	8-8	1-6	3-3	9-6	5-2	9-9	5-4	1-4	10-5	6-1	3-4	–	6–1	9–6
Washington	5-1	8-10	2-5	4-3	0-6	6-12	3-3	2-3	3-5	8-10	3-15	3-5	2-4	2-4	1-6	–	7–11

=== Game log ===
2009 Game Log: 83–78 (Home:46–34, Away: 37–44)
April (10–11)

#	Date	Opponent	Score	Win	Loss	Save	Attendance	Record
1	April 6	@ Astros	4–2	Zambrano (1–0)	Oswalt (0–1)	Gregg (1)	43,827	1–0
2	April 7	@ Astros	2–3 (10)	Brocail (1–0)	Cotts (0–1)		31,121	1–1
3	April 8	@ Astros	11–6	Lilly (1–0)	Moehler (0–1)		30,047	2–1
4	April 10	@ Brewers	3–4	Villanueva (1–0)	Gregg (0–1)		45,455	2–2
5	April 11	@ Brewers	6–5	Heilman (1–0)	Villanueva (1–1)	Mármol (1)	43,768	3–2
6	April 12	@ Brewers	8–5	Dempster (1–0)	Suppan (0–2)		40,168	4–2
7	April 13	Rockies	4–0	Lilly (2–0)	Jiménez (1–1)		40,077	5–2
8	April 15	Rockies	2–5	Marquis (2–0)	Harden (0–1)	Grilli (1)	39,361	5–3
9	April 16	Cardinals	4–7	Wainwright (2–0)	Patton (0–1)	Franklin (2)	38,909	5–4
10	April 17	Cardinals	8–7	Heilman (2–0)	Pérez (0–1)	Mármol (2)	40,250	6–4
11	April 18	Cardinals	7–5 (11)	Guzmán (1–0)	Reyes (0–1)		40,878	7–4
	April 19	Cardinals	Postponed (rain) – rescheduled for July 12					
12	April 21	Reds	7–2	Harden (1–1)	Owings (0–2)		38,403	8–4
13	April 22	Reds	0–3	Cueto (1–1)	Lilly (2–1)	Cordero (6)	38,738	8–5
14	April 23	Reds	1–7	Harang (2–2)	Zambrano (1–1)		40,039	8–6
15	April 24	@ Cardinals	3–4	McClellan (1–0)	Mármol (0–1)	Franklin (5)	45,812	8–7
16	April 25	@ Cardinals	2–8	Boggs (1–0)	Marshall (0–1)		46,707	8–8
17	April 26	@ Cardinals	10–3	Harden (2–1)	Wellemeyer (1–2)		44,742	9–8
18	April 27	@ Diamondbacks	2–7	Haren (2–3)	Lilly (2–2)		29,471	9–9
19	April 28	@ Diamondbacks	11–3	Zambrano (2–1)	Petit (0–2)		30,351	10–9
20	April 29	@ Diamondbacks	0–10	Davis (2–3)	Dempster (1–1)		26,999	10–10
21	April 30	Marlins	2–8 (10)	Pinto (2–0)	Heilman (2–1)		37,956	10–11

May (15–13)

#	Date	Opponent	Score	Win	Loss	Save	Attendance	Record
22	May 1	Marlins	8–6	Patton (1–1)	Badenhop (1–1)	Gregg (2)	38,336	11–11
23	May 2	Marlins	6–1	Lilly (3–2)	Sánchez (1–3)		40,083	12–11
24	May 3	Marlins	6–4	Zambrano (3–1)	Nolasco (1–3)	Gregg (3)	40,457	13–11
25	May 4	Giants	4–2	Dempster (2–1)	Sánchez (1–2)	Gregg (4)	39,112	14–11
26	May 5	Giants	2–6	Lincecum (3–1)	Marshall (0–2)		39,497	14–12
27	May 6	@ Astros	6–3	Harden (3–1)	Hampton (1–3)	Gregg (5)	29,415	15–12
28	May 7	@ Astros	8–5	Lilly (4–2)	Ortiz (2–1)		28,625	16–12
29	May 8	@ Brewers	2–3	Stetter (2–0)	Heilman (2–2)	Hoffman (5)	42,025	16–13
30	May 9	@ Brewers	6–12	Gallardo (4–1)	Dempster (2–2)		44,428	16–14
31	May 10	@ Brewers	4–2	Marshall (1–2)	Suppan (2–3)	Gregg (6)	41,646	17–14
32	May 12	Padres	6–2	Harden (4–1)	Peavy (2–5)		39,963	18–14
33	May 13	Padres	6–4 (8)	Lilly (5–2)	Young (2–2)	Mármol (3)	38,410	19–14
34	May 14	Padres	11–3	Dempster (3–2)	Gaudin (0–3)		39,728	20–14
	May 15	Astros	Postponed (rain) – rescheduled for July 30					
35	May 16	Astros	5–4	Marshall (2–2)	Hawkins (1–1)		40,549	21–14
36	May 17	Astros	5–6	Moehler (1–2)	Harden (4–2)	Sampson (1)	40,478	21–15
37	May 19	@ Cardinals	0–3	Piñeiro (5–3)	Lilly (5–3)		41,374	21–16
38	May 20	@ Cardinals	1–2	Carpenter (2–0)	Dempster (3–3)	Franklin (10)	41,703	21–17
39	May 21	@ Cardinals	1–3	Wainwright (4–2)	Marshall (2–3)	Franklin (11)	44,235	21–18
40	May 22	@ Padres	0–4	Peavy (4–5)	Zambrano (3–2)	Bell (12)	27,260	21–19
41	May 23	@ Padres	1–3	Geer (1–1)	Wells (0–1)	Mujica (1)	37,798	21–20
42	May 24	@ Padres	2–7	Young (4–2)	Lilly (5–4)		39,593	21–21
43	May 25	Pirates	8–10	Gorzelanny (2–1)	Cotts (0–2)	Burnett (1)	38,942	21–22
44	May 26	Pirates	6–1 (6)	Marshall (3–3)	Snell (1–6)		38,303	22–22
45	May 27	Pirates	5–2	Mármol (1–1)	Chavez (0–2)	Gregg (7)	38,314	23–22
46	May 28	Dodgers	1–2	Wolf (3–1)	Wells (0–2)	Troncoso (3)	39,579	23–23
47	May 29	Dodgers	2–1	Lilly (6–4)	Billingsley (6–3)	Gregg (8)	40,148	24–23
48	May 30	Dodgers	7–0	Dempster (4–3)	Stults (4–2)		41,153	25–23
49	May 31	Dodgers	2–8	Milton (2–0)	Marshall (3–4)		40,091	25–24

June (11–14)

#	Date	Opponent	Score	Win	Loss	Save	Attendance	Record
50	June 2	@ Braves	5–6 (12)	Soriano (1–0)	Heilman (2–3)		30,262	25–25
51	June 3	@ Braves	3–2 (11)	Guzmán (2–0)	Bennett (2–3)	Gregg (9)	30,646	26–25
	June 4	@ Braves	Postponed (rain) – rescheduled for June 22					
52	June 5	@ Reds	2–1	Zambrano (4–2)	Owings (3–7)	Gregg (10)	32,374	27–25
53	June 6	@ Reds	3–4 (11)	Masset (3–0)	Marshall (3–5)		40,914	27–26
54	June 7	@ Reds	6–3 (14)	Patton (2–1)	Lincoln (1–1)	Guzmán (1)	32,629	28–26
55	June 9	@ Astros	7–1	Lilly (7–4)	Moehler (2–4)		29,669	29–26
56	June 10	@ Astros	1–2	Sampson (3–0)	Guzmán (2–1)		29,840	29–27
57	June 11	@ Astros	1–2 (13)	Fulchino (2–1)	Ascanio (0–1)		34,250	29–28
58	June 12	Twins	4–7	Slowey (9–2)	Wells (0–3)	Nathan (14)	41,509	29–29
59	June 13	Twins	0–2	Swarzak (2–2)	Harden (4–3)	Nathan (15)	40,899	29–30
60	June 14	Twins	3–2	Mármol (2–1)	Crain (2–3)		40,814	30–30
	June 16	White Sox	Postponed (rain) – rescheduled for September 3					
61	June 17	White Sox	1–4	Danks (5–5)	Dempster (4–4)	Jenks (15)	40,444	30–31
62	June 18	White Sox	6–5	Gregg (1–1)	Thornton (4–2)		40,467	31–31
63	June 19	Indians	8–7 (10)	Gregg (2–1)	Vizcaíno (1–3)		40,155	32–31
64	June 20	Indians	6–5 (13)	Patton (3–1)	Wood (2–3)		41,007	33–31
65	June 21	Indians	6–2	Wells (1–3)	Sowers (1–5)	Gregg (11)	40,866	34–31
66	June 22	@ Braves	0–2	Vázquez (5–6)	Dempster (4–5)	Soriano (6)	31,701	34–32
67	June 23	@ Tigers	4–5	Lyon (3–3)	Gregg (BS 3) (2–2)		38,046	34–33
68	June 24	@ Tigers	3–5	Miner (BS 2) (5–1)	Harden (4–4)	Rodney (15)	36,438	34–34
69	June 25	@ Tigers	5–6	Galarraga (4–7)	Lilly (7–5)	Rodney (16)	42,332	34–35
70	June 26	@ White Sox	5–4	Wells (2–3)	Contreras (2–7)	Gregg (12)	39,015	35–35
71	June 27	@ White Sox	7–8	Jenks (2–2)	Marshall (3–6)		39,529	35–36
72	June 28	@ White Sox	0–6	Danks (6–6)	Zambrano (4–3)		39,745	35–37
73	June 29	@ Pirates	3–1	Harden (5–4)	Duke	Gregg (13)	15,400	36–37
74	June 30	@ Pirates	0–3	Ohlendorf (7–6)	Lilly (7–6)	Capps (18)	17,054	36–38

July (18–9)

#	Date	Opponent	Score	Win	Loss	Save	Attendance	Record
75	July 1	@ Pirates	4–1	Wells (3–3)	Vasquez (1–1)	Gregg (14)	15,770	37–38
76	July 2	Brewers	9–5	Dempster (5–5)	McClung (3–2)		40,545	38–38
77	July 3	Brewers	2–1 (10)	Gregg (3–2)	DiFelice (4–1)		41,204	39–38
78	July 4	Brewers	2–11	Looper (7–4)	Harden (5–5)		40,088	39–39
79	July 5	Brewers	8–2	Lilly (8–6)	Burns (1–2)		40,369	40–39
80	July 6	Braves	4–2	Wells (4–3)	Jurrjens (6–7)	Gregg (15)	40,042	41–39
81	July 7	Braves	1–2	Vázquez (6–7)	Zambrano (4–4)	Soriano (9)	40,359	41–40
82	July 8	Braves	1–4	Kawakami (5–6)	Hart (0–1)	Soriano (10)	40,531	41–41
83	July 10	Cardinals	3–8	Carpenter (7–3)	Harden (5–6)		40,687	41–42
84	July 11	Cardinals	5–2	Lilly (9–6)	Thompson (2–6)	Gregg (16)	41,210	42–42
85	July 12	Cardinals	7–3	Zambrano (5–4)	Lohse (4–5)		40,701	43–42
86	July 12	Cardinals	2–4	Wanwright (10–5)	Wells (4–4)	Franklin (21)	41,244	43–43
87	July 16	@ Nationals	6–2	Harden (6–6)	Lannan (6–7)		26,980	44–43
88	July 17	@ Nationals	3–1	Zambrano (6–4)	Stammen (2–5)	Gregg (17)	27,581	45–43
89	July 18	@ Nationals	6–5	Wells (5–4)	Zimmermann (3–5)	Gregg (18)	36,014	46–43
90	July 19	@ Nationals	11–3	Hart (1–1)	Mock (0–3)		34,574	47–43
91	July 20	@ Phillies	1–10	Lopez (2–0)	Lilly (9–7)	Durbin (1)	45,268	47–44
92	July 21	@ Phillies	1–4 (13)	Condrey (6–2)	Samardzija (0–1)		45,214	47–45
93	July 22	@ Phillies	10–5	Zambrano (7–4)	Moyer (9–7)	Gregg (19)	45,257	48–45
94	July 24	Reds	8–5	Wells (6–4)	Harang (5–11)		41,406	49–45
95	July 25	Reds	5–3	Hart (2–1)	Cueto (8–7)	Gregg (20)	41,364	50–45
96	July 26	Reds	5–2	Harden (7–6)	Owings (6–11)	Gregg (21)	41,528	51–45
97	July 27	Astros	5–1 (13)	Samardzija (1–1)	Sampson (4–2)		40,794	52–45
98	July 28	Astros	6–11	Fulchino (4–3)	Guzmán (2–2)		40,814	52–46
99	July 29	Astros	12–0	Wells (7–4)	Hampton (6–8)		41,538	53–46
100	July 30	Astros	12–3	Hart (3–1)	Ortiz (3–6)		41,524	54–46
101	July 31	@ Marlins	2–5	Donnelly (1–0)	Mármol (2–2)	Núñez (9)	25,024	54–47

August (11–17)

#	Date	Opponent	Score	Win	Loss	Save	Attendance	Record
102	August 1	@ Marlins	9–8 (10)	Gregg (4–2)	Núñez (3–4)	Heilman (1)	35,811	55–47
103	August 2	@ Marlins	2–3	Donnelly (2–0)	Gregg (4–3)		25,969	55–48
104	August 3	@ Reds	4–2	Wells (8–4)	Harang (5–13)	Mármol (4)	22,222	56–48
105	August 4	@ Reds	6–3	Gorzelanny (4–1)	Cueto (8–9)		17,992	57–48
106	August 5	@ Reds	0–4	Lehr (1–0)	Harden (7–7)		22,098	57–49
107	August 7	@ Rockies	2–6	Jiménez (9–9)	Marshall (3–7)		46,118	57–50
108	August 8	@ Rockies	6–5	Dempster (6–5)	Marquis (12–8)	Gregg (22)	47,845	58–50
109	August 9	@ Rockies	5–11	Hammel (7–6)	Wells (8–5)		40,217	58–51
110	August 10	@ Rockies	5–11	de la Rosa (10–8)	Gorzelanny (4–2)		34,485	58–52
111	August 11	Phillies	3–4	Eyre (2–1)	Gregg (4–4)	Durbin (2)	41,477	58–53
112	August 12	Phillies	5–12	Martínez (1–0)	Samardzija (1–2)		41,133	58–54
113	August 13	Phillies	1–6	Lee (10–9)	Dempster (6–6)		41,100	58–55
114	August 14	Pirates	17–2	Wells (9–5)	Morton (2–6)		41,619	59–55
115	August 15	Pirates	3–1	Gorzelanny (5–2)	Duke (9–11)	Gregg (23)	41,197	60–55
	August 16	Pirates	Postponed (rain)					
116	August 17	@ Padres	1–4	Bell (5–2)	Gregg (4–5)		23,420	60–56
117	August 18	@ Padres	3–6	Carrillo (1–1)	Dempster (6–7)	Bell (30)	19,814	60–57
118	August 19	@ Padres	7–1	Harden (8–7)	Latos (4–3)		18,012	61–57
119	August 20	@ Dodgers	2–7	Belisario (2–3)	Guzmán (2–3)		48,974	61–58
120	August 21	@ Dodgers	1–2	Wolf (8–6)	Wells (9–6)	Broxton (27)	51,579	61–59
121	August 22	@ Dodgers	0–2	Haeger (1–1)	Lilly (9–8)	Sherrill (21)	49,297	61–60
122	August 23	@ Dodgers	3–1	Dempster (7–7)	Billingsley (12–7)	Mármol (5)	49,711	62–60
123	August 25	Nationals	6–15	Mock (3–5)	Zambrano (7–5)		37,297	62–61
124	August 26	Nationals	9–4	Guzmán (3–3)	Bergmann (2–3)		36,562	63–61
125	August 27	Nationals	4–5	Martin (3–3)	Wells (9–7)	MacDougal (14)	35,174	63–62
126	August 28	Mets	5–2	Gregg (5–5)	Stokes (1–3)	Mármol (6)	39,381	64–62
127	August 29	Mets	11–4	Dempster (8–7)	Parnell (3–7)		40,857	65–62
128	August 30	Mets	1–4	Figueroa (1–3)	Zambrano (7–6)	Rodríguez (28)	39,907	65–63
129	August 31	Astros	3–5	Oswalt (8–5)	Harden (8–8)	Valverde (20)	36,990	65–64

September (17–12)

#	Date	Opponent	Score	Win	Loss	Save	Attendance	Record
130	September 1	Astros	4–1	Wells (10–7)	Moehler (8–10)	Mármol (7)	36,332	66–64
131	September 2	Astros	2–0	Lilly (10–8)	Paulino (2–7)	Mármol (8)	39,192	67–64
132	September 3	White Sox	0–5	Torres (1–0)	Dempster (8–8)		40,741	67–65
133	September 4	@ Mets	2–6	Stokes (2–4)	Gregg (5–6)	Rodríguez (29)	37,953	67–66
134	September 5	@ Mets	5–3	Harden (9–8)	Figueroa (2–4)	Mármol (9)	38,759	68–66
135	September 6	@ Mets	2–4	Pelfrey (10–10)	Wells (10–8)	Rodríguez (30)	39,593	68–67
136	September 7	@ Pirates	4–2	Lilly (11–8)	McCutchen (0–1)	Mármol (10)	14,673	69–67
137	September 8	@ Pirates	9–4	Dempster (9–8)	Duke (10–14)		17,862	70–67
138	September 9	@ Pirates	8–5	Zambrano (8–6)	Hart (4–6)	Mármol (11)	10,899	71–67
139	September 11	Reds	6–4	Stevens (1–0)	Lehr (4–2)	Mármol (12)	39,881	72–67
140	September 12	Reds	5–7	Rhodes (1–1)	Mármol (2–3)	Cordero (34)	40,351	72–68
141	September 13	Reds	5–2	Lilly (12–8)	Bailey (5–5)		39,805	73–68
142	September 14	Brewers	2–0	Dempster (10–8)	Suppan (6–10)	Mármol (13)	38,725	74–68
143	September 15	Brewers	13–7	Heilman (3–3)	Gallardo (12–12)		38,986	75–68
144	September 16	Brewers	5–9	Looper (13–6)	Harden (9–9)		38,084	75–69
145	September 17	Brewers	4–7	Bush (5–7)	Wells (10–9)	Hoffman (33)	39,158	75–70
146	September 18	@ Cardinals	2–3	Franklin (3–3)	Heilman (3–4)		45,959	75–71
147	September 19	@ Cardinals	1–2	Franklin (4–3)	Mármol (2–4)		46,506	75–72
148	September 20	@ Cardinals	6–3 (11)	Caridad (1–0)	Boggs (2–3)	Mármol (14)	44,937	76–72
149	September 21	@ Brewers	10–2	Gorzelanny (6–2)	Looper (13–7)		34,192	77–72
150	September 22	@ Brewers	7–2	Wells (11–9)	Bush (5–8)		34,316	78–72
151	September 23	@ Brewers	2–3	Narveson (2–0)	Samardzija (1–3)	Hoffman (35)	32,340	78–73
152	September 24	@ Giants	3–2	Heilman (4–4)	Wilson (5–6)	Mármol (15)	31,603	79–73
153	September 25	@ Giants	3–0	Zambrano (9–6)	Lincecum (14–7)		33,970	80–73
154	September 26	@ Giants	6–2	Gorzelanny (7–2)	Zito (10–13)		35,885	81–73
155	September 27	@ Giants	1–5	Cain (14–7)	Wells (11–10)	Wilson (37)	38,330	81–74
156	September 29	Pirates	6–0	Dempster (11–8)	Hart (4–9)		35,308	82–74
157	September 30	Pirates	0–4	Morton (5–9)	Lilly (12–9)		34,362	82–75
158	September 30	Pirates	2–8	Karstens (4–5)	Zambrano (9–7)		33,299	82–76

October (1–2)

#	Date	Opponent	Score	Win	Loss	Save	Attendance	Record
159	October 1	Pirates	Canceled					
160	October 2	Diamondbacks	3–12	Buckner (4–6)	Gorzelanny (7–3)		33,786	82–77
161	October 3	Diamondbacks	5–0	Wells (12–10)	Cabrera (0–6)		39,138	83–77
162	October 4	Diamondbacks	2–5	Davis (9–14)	Dempster (11–9)	Gutiérrez (9)	39,154	83–78

Please do not edit this line: OgreBot End-->

=== Roster ===
2009 Chicago Cubs
Roster
Pitchers: 58 José Ascanio; 60 Mitch Atkins; 64 Justin Berg; 33 Esmailin Caridad; 48 Neal Cotts; 46 Ryan Dempster; 44 Chad Fox; 22 Tom Gorzelanny; 43 John Grabow; 63 Kevin Gregg; 37 Ángel Guzmán; 40 Rich Harden; 22 Kevin Hart; 47 Aaron Heilman; 30 Ted Lilly; 49 Carlos Mármol; 45 Sean Marshall; 54 David Patton; 29 Jeff Samardzija; 52 Jeff Stevens; 51 Luis Vizcaíno; 43 Jason Waddell; 36 Randy Wells; 38 Carlos Zambrano	Catchers: 55 Koyie Hill; 18 Geovany Soto; Infielders: 28 Jeff Baker; 13 Andrés Blanco; 17 Mike Fontenot; 4 Ryan Freel; 5 Jake Fox; 25 Derrek Lee; 7 Aaron Miles; 16 Aramis Ramírez; 24 Bobby Scales; 2 Ryan Theriot; Outfielders: 21 Milton Bradley; 21 Tyler Colvin; 1 Kosuke Fukudome; 27 Sam Fuld; 4 Joey Gathright; 6 Micah Hoffpauir; 9 Reed Johnson; 12 Alfonso Soriano; 99 So Taguchi	Manager: 41 Lou Piniella; Coaching Staff: 59 Iván DeJesús (special asst); 51 Von Joshua (hitting); 28 Gerald Perry (hitting); 8 Mike Quade (third base); 50 Larry Rothschild (pitching); 39 Matt Sinatro (first base); 35 Lester Strode (bullpen); 3 Alan Trammell (bench)

=== Key injuries ===
The Cubs were plagued by injuries in 2009, and were only able to field their Opening Day starting lineup three times the entire season. Third baseman Aramis Ramírez injured his throwing shoulder in an early May game against the Milwaukee Brewers, sidelining him until early July and forcing journeyman players like Mike Fontenot and Aaron Miles into more prominent roles. Additionally, key players like Derrek Lee (back), Alfonso Soriano (legs and knee) and Geovany Soto (shoulder) nursed minor, nagging injuries.

== Player stats ==
=== Batting ===
==== Starters by position ====
Note: Pos = Position; G = Games played; AB = At bats; H = Hits; Avg. = Batting average; HR = Home runs; RBI = Runs batted in

Pos	Player	G	AB	H	Avg.	HR	RBI
C	Geovany Soto	102	331	72	.218	11	47
1B	Derrek Lee	141	532	163	.306	35	111
2B	Mike Fontenot	135	377	89	.236	9	43
SS	Ryan Theriot	154	602	171	.284	7	54
3B	Aramis Ramírez	82	306	97	.317	15	65
LF	Alfonso Soriano	117	477	115	.241	20	55
CF	Kosuke Fukudome	146	499	129	.259	11	54
RF	Milton Bradley	124	393	101	.257	12	40

==== Other batters ====
Note: G = Games played; AB = At bats; H = Hits; Avg. = Batting average; HR = Home runs; RBI = Runs batted in

Player	G	AB	H	Avg.	HR	RBI
Koyie Hill	83	253	60	.237	2	24
Micah Hoffpauir	105	234	56	.239	10	35
Jake Fox	82	216	56	.259	11	44
Jeff Baker	69	203	62	.305	4	21
Reed Johnson	65	186	42	.255	4	22
Aaron Miles	74	157	29	.185	0	5
Bobby Scales	51	124	30	.242	3	15
Andrés Blanco	53	123	31	.252	1	12
Sam Fuld	65	97	29	.299	1	2
Ryan Freel	14	28	4	.143	0	1
Tyler Colvin	6	17	3	.176	0	2
Joey Gathright	20	14	3	.214	0	0
So Taguchi	6	11	3	.273	0	0

=== Pitching ===
==== Starting and other pitchers ====
Note: G = Games pitched; IP = Innings pitched; W = Wins; L = Losses; ERA = Earned run average; SO = Strikeouts; WHIP = Walks+hits per inning pitched

Player	G	IP	W	L	ERA	SO	WHIP
Ryan Dempster	31	200.0	11	9	3.64	172	1.305
Ted Lilly	27	177.0	12	9	3.10	151	1.056
Carlos Zambrano	28	169.1	9	7	3.77	152	1.376
Randy Wells	27	165.1	12	10	3.05	104	1.276
Rich Harden	26	141.0	9	9	4.09	171	1.340
Sean Marshall	55	85.1	3	7	4.32	68	1.441
Tom Gorzelanny	13	38.1	4	2	5.63	40	1.357
Kevin Hart	8	27.2	3	1	2.60	13	1.482

==== Relief pitchers ====
Note: G = Games pitched; W = Wins; L = Losses; SV = Saves; IP = Innings pitched; ERA = Earned run average; SO = Strikeouts; WHIP = Walks+hits per inning pitched

Player	G	W	L	SV	IP	ERA	SO	WHIP
Kevin Gregg	72	5	6	23	68.2	4.72	71	1.311
Carlos Mármol	79	2	4	15	74.0	3.41	93	1.459
Ángel Guzmán	55	3	3	1	61.0	2.95	47	1.049
Aaron Heilman	70	4	4	1	72.1	4.11	65	1.410
John Grabow	30	0	0	0	25.0	3.24	16	1.240
Neal Cotts	19	0	2	0	11.0	7.36	9	2.091
David Patton	20	3	1	0	27.2	6.36	23	1.807
Jeff Samardzija	20	1	3	0	34.2	7.20	21	1.760
José Ascanio	14	0	1	0	15.1	3.52	18	1.761
Esmailin Caridad	14	1	0	0	19.1	1.40	17	0.931
Jeff Stevens	11	1	0	0	12.2	7.11	9	1.737
Justin Berg	11	0	0	0	12.0	0.75	7	0.917
Luis Vizcaíno	4	0	0	0	3.2	0.00	3	0.545
Jason Waddell	3	0	0	0	1.2	5.40	2	1.800
Mitch Atkins	2	0	0	0	2.0	0.00	0	0.500
Chad Fox	2	0	0	0	0.1	135.00	0	15.000

== 2008–2009 off-season ==
=== Trades ===
November 13, 2008	To Florida Marlins José Ceda	To Chicago Cubs Kevin Gregg
December 31, 2008	to Cleveland Indians Mark DeRosa	to Chicago Cubs Minor league prospects (Gaub, Stevens, Archer)
January 6, 2009	to Colorado Rockies Jason Marquis	to Chicago Cubs Luis Vizcaíno
January 17, 2009	to Baltimore Orioles Félix Pie	to Chicago Cubs Garrett Olson and Henry Williamson
January 27, 2009	to Seattle Mariners Ronny Cedeño and Garrett Olson	to Chicago Cubs Aaron Heilman
May 8, 2009	to Baltimore Orioles Joey Gathright	to Chicago Cubs Ryan Freel
July 2, 2009	to Colorado Rockies Al Alburquerque	to Chicago Cubs Jeff Baker
July 6, 2009	to Kansas City Royals Ryan Freel	to Chicago Cubs player to be named later
July 30, 2009	to Pittsburgh Pirates Kevin Hart, José Ascanio, and Josh Harrison	to Chicago Cubs John Grabow and Tom Gorzelanny

=== Free agent acquisitions ===
Player	Former team	Contract Terms
Joey Gathright	Kansas City Royals	1 year, $800,000
Aaron Miles	St. Louis Cardinals	2 years, Undisclosed
Milton Bradley	Texas Rangers	3 years, $30,000,000
So Taguchi	Philadelphia Phillies	1 year, $900,000
Paul Bako	Cincinnati Reds	Undisclosed

=== Players lost to free agency ===
Player	New team
Bob Howry	San Francisco Giants
Kerry Wood	Cleveland Indians
Henry Blanco	San Diego Padres
Daryle Ward	Cincinnati Reds
Jim Edmonds	Retired

== Sale of the franchise ==
After many years of speculation that the Chicago Tribune wanted to sell the Chicago Cubs organization, they finally inked a deal on January 22, 2009 with the Ricketts family for a total of $900 million. The sale included the Cubs, Wrigley Field, and the Tribune's 25% stake in the Comcast Sports Network Chicago, a regional TV channel.

== Media ==
- Radio: Chicago Cubs Radio Network

The Chicago Cubs radio broadcasting team was anchored by veteran announcers Pat Hughes and Ron Santo making it the duo's 15th year together. Hughes provided the play by play while Santo served as the color commentator.

- TV: Comcast SportsNet Chicago, WGN-TV, WGN America, WCIU-TV

The Chicago Cubs 2009 television broadcasting team was anchored by Len Kasper and Bob Brenly. Games could be seen on multiple channels including: WGN-TV, Comcast SportsNet Chicago, WGN America, and WCIU-TV.

== Farm system ==
Level	Team	League	Manager
AAA	Iowa Cubs	Pacific Coast League	Bobby Dickerson
AA	Tennessee Smokies	Southern League	Ryne Sandberg
A	Daytona Cubs	Florida State League	Buddy Bailey
A	Peoria Chiefs	Midwest League	Marty Pevey
A-Short Season	Boise Hawks	Northwest League	Casey Kopitzke
Rookie	AZL Cubs	Arizona League	Juan Cabreja
