= Jim Hendry =

American baseball executive

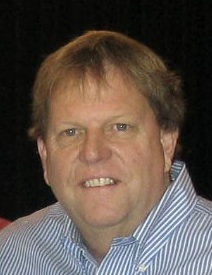
- Hendry in 2006
- Born: July 27, 1955 (age 71); Dunedin, Florida, U.S.
- Education: Spring Hill College
- Occupation: Major League Baseball executive
- Organization: New York Yankees

James Hendry (born July 27, 1955) is an American baseball executive. He is a special assistant for New York Yankees general manager Brian Cashman, and is a former general manager of the Chicago Cubs.

Hendry was promoted to Cubs general manager on July 5, 2002, by former Cubs president/CEO Andy MacPhail. He worked for the Cubs from 1995 to 2011. Prior to his promotion to GM, he was named assistant GM and player personnel director on October 12, 2001, and previously the director of player development, in charge of both scouting and minor league operations. He was a coach for the Creighton Bluejays of Creighton University from 1984 to 1991.

== Early life ==
Hendry graduated from Spring Hill College, where he majored in communications and journalism. He could not find a job in broadcasting and took a job as a high school teacher and baseball coach in Miami. This led to a job at Creighton University in 1983, and he was promoted to head coach in the middle of the 1984 season. Following Creighton's 1991 College World Series appearance, Hendry was named National Coach of the Year. He left Creighton later that year to become special assistant to then Florida Marlins GM Dave Dombrowski, and also coached minor league teams in 1993 and 1994. Jim has two kids, Lauren and John.

== Tenure with Cubs ==
Hendry's tenure as general manager produced mixed results. In 2003, the Cubs made their first playoff appearance in the Hendry era, but just three years later, Hendry's Cubs had the worst record in the National League. One of his first moves provided fodder for critics and boosters alike: late in spring training 2002, he dealt Julián Tavárez and Dontrelle Willis to the Florida Marlins for pitchers Matt Clement and Antonio Alfonseca. The deal produced mixed results; Clement was the Cubs' most consistent pitcher in 2002 and continued to be valuable in 2003, while Tavarez's volatile behavior was a distraction to the Cubs in 2001. On the downside, Alfonseca struggled while a Cub, and the minor league pitcher traded to the Marlins was Dontrelle Willis, the 2003 Rookie of the Year.

The Cubs did not contend in 2002, and Hendry fired manager Don Baylor in July, replacing him with Iowa Cubs manager Bruce Kimm on an interim basis. The Cubs staggered to the end of the season in 2002, and Hendry purged several veterans from the roster. One veteran, Todd Hundley, a free agent acquisition before the 2001 season, struggled on the field, feuded with fans, and had even begun to tarnish the image of his father Randy Hundley, a member of the Cubs teams of the 1960s and 1970s. Hundley's large contract would have made trading him difficult, so the only way that he could leave the team would be if Hendry released him. Nevertheless, former Los Angeles Dodgers general manager Dan Evans, offered second baseman Mark Grudzielanek and first baseman Eric Karros. Grudzielanek and Karros were also high-priced veterans with their careers waning. But the two players managed productive seasons in 2003, also providing veteran leadership.

Hendry made his biggest splash in the 2002–03 offseason when he hired former San Francisco Giants manager Dusty Baker to manage the club just days after Baker's Giants lost in seven games to the Anaheim Angels in the World Series.

=== 2003 Cubs: Only five outs away ===
The Cubs started 2003 well but stumbled after center fielder Corey Patterson injured his knee in June. A little more than two weeks after his injury, Hendry sent prospect Bobby Hill and veteran José Hernández to the Pittsburgh Pirates for a center fielder who could replace Patterson for the remainder of the season, Kenny Lofton. The Cubs also received third baseman Aramis Ramírez in the trade, ending the revolving door that had been at 3B ever since Ron Santo was traded to the White Sox. Ramirez blossomed into a star with the Cubs, and Lofton provided the spark at the top of the lineup that the Cubs needed.

The Cubs won the National League Central Division title in 2003, and beat Atlanta in the National League Division Series, their first postseason series victory since 1908. They then came within five outs from their first World Series appearance since 1945. They were up three games to one on the Florida Marlins in the NLCS and ended up losing the last three games, including the infamous Game 6 involving fan Steve Bartman followed by an error by Alex Gonzalez on a routine double play ball that would have ended the inning with the score 3-1 in favor of the Cubs.

=== The disappointment of 2004 ===
After failing to close out the 2003 NLCS against the Florida Marlins, Hendry made several acquisitions, picking up first baseman Derrek Lee for Hee-seop Choi in a trade with the Marlins, acquiring catcher Michael Barrett in a three-way trade with the Oakland Athletics, giving up Damian Miller in the process and Montreal Expos, signing free agents LaTroy Hawkins, Todd Walker and Greg Maddux. On March 25, 2004, he sent prospect pitchers Juan Cruz and Steve Smyth to the Atlanta Braves for two minor leaguers, pitcher Andy Pratt and infielder Richard Lewis.

The Cubs were Sports Illustrated's preseason choice to win the World Series in 2004. Injuries to key players like Mark Prior, Sammy Sosa, Kerry Wood, Joe Borowski, and Alex Gonzalez hindered the Cubs during the early part of the season. On July 31, Hendry made a four-team deal with the Montreal Expos, Minnesota Twins and Boston Red Sox, sending Gonzalez and prospects Brendan Harris and Francis Beltrán to the Expos and prospect Justin Jones to the Minnesota Twins. In return, the Cubs received All-Star shortstop Nomar Garciaparra from Boston, along with prospect Matt Murton.

Garciaparra missed several games down the stretch because of an injury to his groin, forcing Hendry to sign Neifi Pérez off of waivers. Meanwhile, the Cubs' bullpen became a bigger and bigger source of concern. With Borowski out for the season, the Cubs made Hawkins the closer, and Hawkins struggled down the stretch, blowing two key games the last week of the season. The Cubs led the Wild Card race by 1 1/2 games with nine to go before fading to three games behind the eventual Wild Card winner, the Houston Astros.

As the Cubs saw their lead in the Wild Card race disintegrate, the Cubs became mired in controversy regarding the treatment of the team by television announcers Chip Caray and Steve Stone. After the 2004 season, Chip Caray signed a deal to broadcast Atlanta Braves games (with his father, Skip Caray) while Stone eventually decided not to return as Cubs' color commentator. Meanwhile, slugger Sammy Sosa walked out on his team twice at the end of the season. The first time came during an extra-inning loss to the Montreal Expos at Wrigley Field when Sosa, who did not start because of back spasms, decided to leave the ballpark in the seventh inning to beat traffic on Lake Shore Drive back to his condominium at Lake Point Towers. With Sosa not on the bench available to pinch-hit, Baker called on Ramón Martínez to pinch-hit with the tying run on base in the 12th inning of a 7–6 loss. The second time came in the last game of the season when Sosa left the park moments after learning he wasn't in the starting lineup. When Sosa claimed he stayed until the seventh inning of the game, Hendry released a surveillance tape showing Sosa leaving the park shortly after the 1:20 first pitch.

As a result, the first priority of the 2004–2005 offseason was unloading Sosa. After in-depth talks with the New York Mets and Washington Nationals, the Cubs sent Sosa to the Baltimore Orioles, getting utility player Jerry Hairston Jr., second baseman Mike Fontenot and pitcher David Crouthers. Hendry then signed veteran Jeromy Burnitz to replace Sosa in right field. He signed middle reliever Chad Fox and traded Kyle Farnsworth to the Detroit Tigers for Roberto Novoa and minor-leaguers Scott Moore and Bo Flowers.

=== 2006 Cubs: A season of disarray ===
After a sub-.500 season marred by injuries in 2005, the Cubs made few major moves going into the 2006 season.

Before the 2006 season, Hendry received a two-year contract extension from the Tribune Company. The biggest move was trading three young pitchers, Ricky Nolasco, Sergio Mitre, and Renyel Pinto to the Marlins for center fielder Juan Pierre. In November 2005, Hendry attempted to shore up his bullpen with relievers Scott Eyre and Bob Howry. The Cubs also signed free agent Jacque Jones to play right field. He signed injured free agent starter Wade Miller to a one-year, $1 million contract with $1 million in incentives. Hendry also re-signed journeymen players like Glendon Rusch and Neifi Pérez to multi-year deals. Again, injuries marred the 2006 season with Lee going down with a broken wrist just 14 games into the season. Mark Prior and Kerry Wood again went down with frequent injuries. Another factor in the Cubs' poor performance in 2006 was their finishing last in the major leagues in walks.

As the Cubs struggled into July, Hendry announced that he was going to evaluate the coaching staff's performance at the All-Star Break, causing many pundits to speculate that Baker, as well as coaches Gene Clines, Gary Matthews, Larry Rothschild and Dick Pole, were in jeopardy of losing their jobs. Hendry responded that he was not necessarily firing anyone and that he would not necessarily finish his evaluation over the four-day break. On July 26, Hendry announced manager Dusty Baker would stay on for the rest of the season. At the end of July Hendry traded Maddux to the Los Angeles Dodgers for shortstop César Izturis, and Walker to the San Diego Padres for pitching prospect José Ceda, both of which were announced after the deadline had actually passed, but were completed before the deadline. Wade Miller made his first start of the season on September 9, 2006, making five starts total and finishing the season 0–2 with a 4.57 ERA. He filed for free agency after the season and has subsequently re-signed with a contract extension.

On October 2, 2006, Hendry announced that the Cubs would not offer manager Dusty Baker a contract extension. The Cubs finished the 2006 season with 66 wins and 96 losses, finishing 17 1/2 games behind division winner and eventual 2006 World Series Champions St. Louis Cardinals and last place in the National League Central Division. It was the first time the Cubs finished in last place during Hendry's tenure as general manager and the first time as a team since 2000.

=== Preparing for 2007 ===
Hendry began a huge offseason spending spree starting on October 17, 2006, when Hendry hired veteran manager Lou Piniella to replace Dusty Baker as the Cubs manager for at least the next three seasons with a club option for a fourth season. On November 19, Hendry signed former Washington Nationals superstar Alfonso Soriano to an 8-year, $136 million contract to play outfield for the Cubs. Third baseman Aramis Ramírez opted out of his current contract and filed for free agency, but subsequently signed a new contract with the Cubs, a five-year $73 million deal.

In other moves, Hendry inked Wade Miller to an incentive-laden, one-year $1.5 million extension to stay with the Cubs. He also signed free agent second baseman and utility player Mark DeRosa (previously of the Texas Rangers) to a three-year, $13 million deal on November 14, 2006. On November 16, 2006. He completed a trade sending relievers David Aardsma and prospect Carlos Vásquez to the cross-town rival Chicago White Sox for left-handed setup man Neal Cotts. On December 6, 2006, the Cubs agreed to a four-year, $40 million deal with free agent pitcher Ted Lilly, who played the previous season for the Toronto Blue Jays, beating out the New York Yankees, while Hendry was being hospitalized for chest pains. On December 9, it was reported that Hendry signed free agent Jason Marquis to a three-year, $20 million contract. Marquis had last pitched for St. Louis. On December 15, the Cubs also announced their signing of backup first baseman and outfielder Daryle Ward. Hendry also signed outfielder/1B veteran Cliff Floyd, a Chicago native, to a one-year, $3 million deal on January 24, 2007. Hendry inked Mark Prior to a one-year, $3.575 million contract for 2007 as well.

The Cubs sent utility outfielder prospect Freddie Bynum to the Baltimore Orioles for a player to be named later (right-handed pitcher Kevin Hart). They selected former number-one Rule 5 draft pick Josh Hamilton from the Tampa Bay Devil Rays and immediately traded him to the Cincinnati Reds for cash considerations. In the draft, the Cubs also selected right-handed pitcher James Henderson from Washington, and lost: left-handed pitcher Edward Campusano to the Milwaukee Brewers, right-handed pitcher Lincoln Holdzkom to the Houston Astros, infielder Richard Lewis to the Kansas City Royals, and shortstop Jason Smith to Toronto.

By the start of Spring Training, Hendry spent $300 million in new contracts.

=== 2007 season ===
With new ownership coming at the end of the 2007 season and with the Cubs falling in the standings in May and June, Hendry's chances of staying as the general manager remained an open question at midseason.

On May 28, 2007, Jim Hendry stated that his team was underachieving. At the time, the Cub had a 22–26 record and were five games behind division-leading Milwaukee.

After June 2, the Chicago Cubs went on to put up the best record in baseball as they chased after a playoff spot. Help arrived when Jim Hendry made it clear that the team was a buyer and not a seller with the acquisitions of Jason Kendall, Craig Monroe, and Steve Trachsel. On September 28, 2007, the Cubs clinched the National League Central for the first time since 2003 with an 84–76 record.

The Cubs were swept by the Arizona Diamondbacks in the first round of the 2007 NLDS. In October 2008, the Cubs extended Hendry's contract for an additional four years.

=== 2008 season ===
Japanese superstar Kosuke Fukudome made his arrival to the U.S. and was signed by Hendry to a 4-year $48 Million contract to play right field. Fukudome began the season with strong play, but cooled down and left fans disappointed as the season wore on. Rich Harden was acquired from Oakland midway through the 2008 season and proved to be a key trade in their success. The Cubs led the Central Division nearly the entire year and ended with the best record in the National League (97 wins). However, against the Los Angeles Dodgers, they were once again swept in the NLDS.

=== Final years with the Cubs (2009–11) ===
Despite consistently having a team with one of the highest payrolls in baseball, the Cubs struggled in Hendry's final seasons with the club. From 2009 through 2011, the Cubs have had the 2nd, 1st, and 2nd highest payrolls in the National League respectively. Prior to 2009, Hendry signed enigmatic OF Milton Bradley to a 3-year/$30 million contract. The Cubs finished 2009 barely above .500 at 83-78 and Bradley was a major bust. He finished the year suspended by the team. In 2010, for most of the season they were one of the worst teams in baseball. Despite finishing the season strongly, they ended up at 75-87. In 2011, the Cubs once again possessed one of the worst records in baseball, finishing at 71-91, 25 games behind the first-place Cardinals.

Under Hendry's leadership, the Cubs drafted Javier Baez. Cubs chairman Tom Ricketts notified Hendry on July 22, 2011, that he wouldn't be retained as general manager. Hendry was allowed to remain with the team to help get the Cubs’ draft picks signed. He was relieved of his duties on August 19, 2011, and replaced on an interim basis by assistant general manager Randy Bush.

Hendry was the first general manager in Cubs history to oversee three postseason clubs (2003, 2007, 2008) and was the first Cubs general manager to lead the franchise to consecutive postseason berths since the 1930s. Under his tenure, the Cubs were 749-748. He was the third longest-serving general manager in the history of the club.

== New York Yankees (2012–present) ==
On January 31, 2012, Hendry agreed to a multi-year deal to become a special assistant to Yankees GM Brian Cashman and is also listed as a special assignment scout.

Sporting positions
Preceded by Carlos Tosca	Gulf Coast League Marlins manager 1993	Succeeded by Juan Bustabad
Preceded by Lynn Jones	Elmira Pioneers manager 1994	Succeeded by Paul Kirsch
Preceded by Andy MacPhail	Chicago Cubs general manager 2002–2011	Succeeded by Randy Bush
