= Jeff Stevens =

Jeff Stevens may refer to:

- Jeff Stevens (baseball) (born 1983), American baseball pitcher
- Jeff Stevens (singer) (born 1959), American country music singer, songwriter and record producer

== See also ==
- Geoff Stephens, British musician
