= Esmailin Caridad =

Dominican baseball player (born 1983)

- Pitcher
- Born: October 28, 1983 (age 42); Haina, Dominican Republic
- Batted: Right Threw: Right

Professional debut
- NPB: July 5, 2007, for the Hiroshima Toyo Carp
- MLB: August 10, 2009, for the Chicago Cubs
- KBO: August 2, 2013, for the Samsung Lions

Last appearance
- NPB: July 7, 2007, for the Hiroshima Toyo Carp
- MLB: May 18, 2010, for the Chicago Cubs
- KBO: August 2, 2013, for the Samsung Lions

NPB statistics
- Win–loss record: 0–0
- Earned run average: 0.00
- Strikeouts: 0

MLB statistics
- Win–loss record: 1–1
- Earned run average: 3.09
- Strikeouts: 21

KBO statistics
- Win–loss record: 0–1
- Earned run average: 27.00
- Strikeouts: 1
- Stats at Baseball Reference

Teams
- Hiroshima Toyo Carp (2007); Chicago Cubs (2009–2010); Samsung Lions (2013)

Career highlights and awards
- Korean Series champion (2013)

Esmailin Manuel Caridad (born October 28, 1983) is a Dominican former professional right-handed pitcher. He played in Major League Baseball (MLB) for the Chicago Cubs, in Nippon Professional Baseball for the Hiroshima Toyo Carp, and in the KBO League for the Samsung Lions.

== Career ==
=== Guangdong Leopards ===
He spent the majority of the 2006 season in the Guangdong Leopards.

=== Hiroshima Toyo Carp ===
He spent the majority of the 2007 season in the Hiroshima Toyo Carp's Carp Dominican Academy in the Dominican Republic. That season, he made two scoreless relief appearances for the Carp in Japan's Nippon Professional Baseball.

=== Chicago Cubs ===
The following season, Caridad signed with the Chicago Cubs and was assigned to A-Advanced Daytona. In the middle of June, Caridad was promoted to Double-A Tennessee. In 28 appearances that year (27 starts), Caridad went 13–7 with a 3.73 ERA while striking out 88 over 152 innings.

Caridad began the 2009 season with Triple-A Iowa. On August 10, Caridad was called up to the major-league team, replacing Jeff Stevens. He made his debut that day, pitching 5.1 innings in relief of Tom Gorzelanny, giving up 3 runs (2 earned) while striking out 4. He was optioned back to Iowa when Carlos Zambrano was activated from the disabled list, but was recalled in September when the rosters expanded. In 14 appearances, Caridad went 1–0 with a 1.40 ERA while striking out 17 over 19.1 innings.

Caridad made the Opening Day roster for Chicago, but was placed on the disabled list on April 14 with a right forearm strain. Caridad was activated on May 8, and Jeff Gray, who was recalled when Caridad went on the disabled list, was optioned to Iowa. However, Caridad was placed on the disabled list on May 19 with a right elbow strain. On September 7, Caridad was transferred to the 60-day disabled list, ending his season. In 8 appearances, Caridad went 0–1 with an 11.25 ERA, while striking out 4 in 4 innings.

Caridad spent the next 3 seasons (minus a 5-game stint with Tennessee in 2011) with Iowa, until he was released on July 18, 2013. In 86 appearances with Iowa since 2011 (2 starts), Caridad went 7–9 with a 4.95 ERA and 4 saves, while striking out 119 in 393 innings.

=== Samsung Lions ===
Caridad signed with the Samsung Lions of the Korea Baseball Organization after his release, and won the Korean Series with the club.

=== Tigres de Quintana Roo ===
On March 28, 2016, Caridad signed with the Tigres de Quintana Roo of the Mexican Baseball League.

=== Vaqueros Laguna ===
He was traded to the Vaqueros Laguna on June 10, 2016. Caridad was released on May 29, 2017.
