= Neal Cotts =

American baseball player (born 1980)

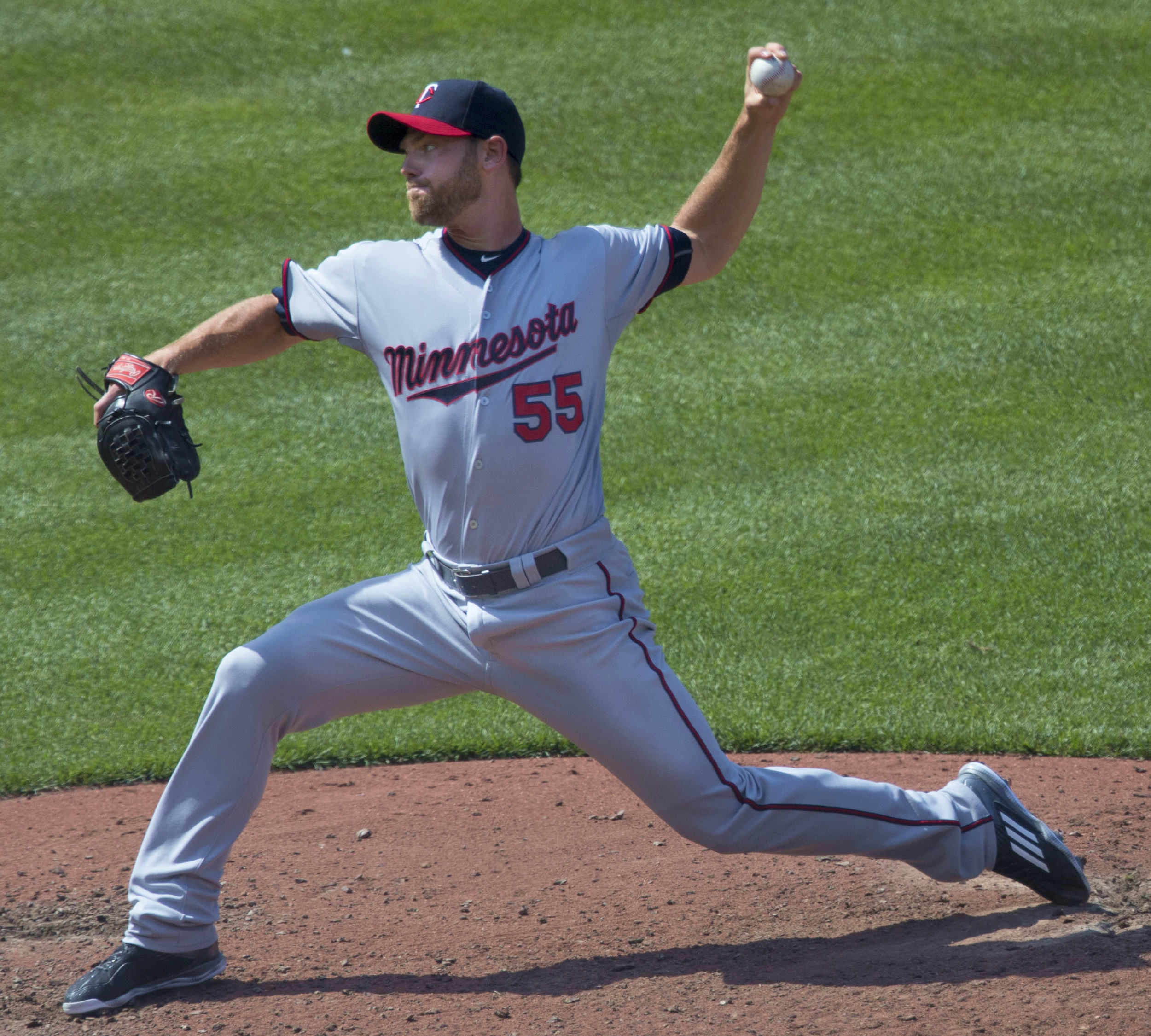
- Cotts with the Minnesota Twins in 2015
- Pitcher
- Born: March 25, 1980 (age 46); Lebanon, Illinois, U.S.
- Batted: Left Threw: Left

MLB debut
- August 12, 2003, for the Chicago White Sox

Last MLB appearance
- October 3, 2015, for the Minnesota Twins

MLB statistics
- Win–loss record: 21–24
- Earned run average: 3.96
- Strikeouts: 421
- Stats at Baseball Reference

Teams
- Chicago White Sox (2003–2006); Chicago Cubs (2007–2009); Texas Rangers (2013–2014); Milwaukee Brewers (2015); Minnesota Twins (2015)

Career highlights and awards
- World Series champion (2005)

Neal James Cotts (born March 25, 1980) is an American former professional baseball pitcher. He played in Major League Baseball (MLB) for the Chicago White Sox, Chicago Cubs, Texas Rangers, Milwaukee Brewers, and Minnesota Twins.

== College career ==
Cotts attended Illinois State University where he won first-team All-Missouri Valley Conference honors and was named to the ABCA All-Midwest Region team. He was drafted by the Oakland Athletics 69th overall in the 2nd round of the 2001 draft, becoming the second highest player drafted in the history of Illinois State. Cotts finished his collegiate career ranked fifth all-time in school history in strikeouts with 263 in just three seasons with the Redbirds.

== Professional career ==
=== Minors ===
Cotts spent the 2002 season at Single-A Modesto of the California League, winning 12 games in 28 starts. During the off-season, he was traded to the Chicago White Sox in a six-player deal involving relief pitchers Billy Koch and Keith Foulke. Cotts began the 2003 season ranked as the number three prospect in the White Sox farm system. He started his year at Double-A Birmingham, of the Southern League, going 9–6 with a 2.12 ERA and 131 strikeouts. In July 2003, he started for the United States in Major League Baseball's Futures Game.

=== Chicago White Sox ===
Cotts made his Major League debut for Chicago on August 12, 2003, when he started against the Anaheim Angels. He pitched 2.1 innings and allowed two runs, two hits, and six walks. He received a no-decision in the game. On August 22, he won his first game when he pitched five innings and allowed five hits against the Texas Rangers. He ended the season with a record of 1–1 and an 8.10 ERA.

In 2004, new manager Ozzie Guillén inserted Cotts into the bullpen. He finished April with a 0.90 ERA, but from May–July had an ERA of 8.28. He finished the season with 65.1 innings pitched, a 4–4 record, and an ERA of 5.65. On June 18, he got his first major league hit, a double, off Luis Ayala of the Montreal Expos.

In 2005, Cotts went 4–0 while appearing in 69 games, throwing 60.1 innings, compiling a 1.94 ERA, striking out 58, and yielding just 1 home run. MLB.com awarded him the "Setup Man of the Year Award", an award determined by fan voting. In the American League Championship Series, he was the only White Sox reliever to appear in Chicago's 4–1 series win, throwing 2/3 of an inning in Game 1. Cotts pitched in all four games of the World Series and was the winning pitcher in Game 2.

=== Chicago Cubs ===
On November 16, 2006, Cotts was traded to the Chicago Cubs for relief pitcher David Aardsma and minor league pitcher Carlos Vásquez. On May 21, 2007, the Cubs optioned Cotts to the Triple–A Iowa Cubs, recalling left-handed pitcher Sean Marshall.

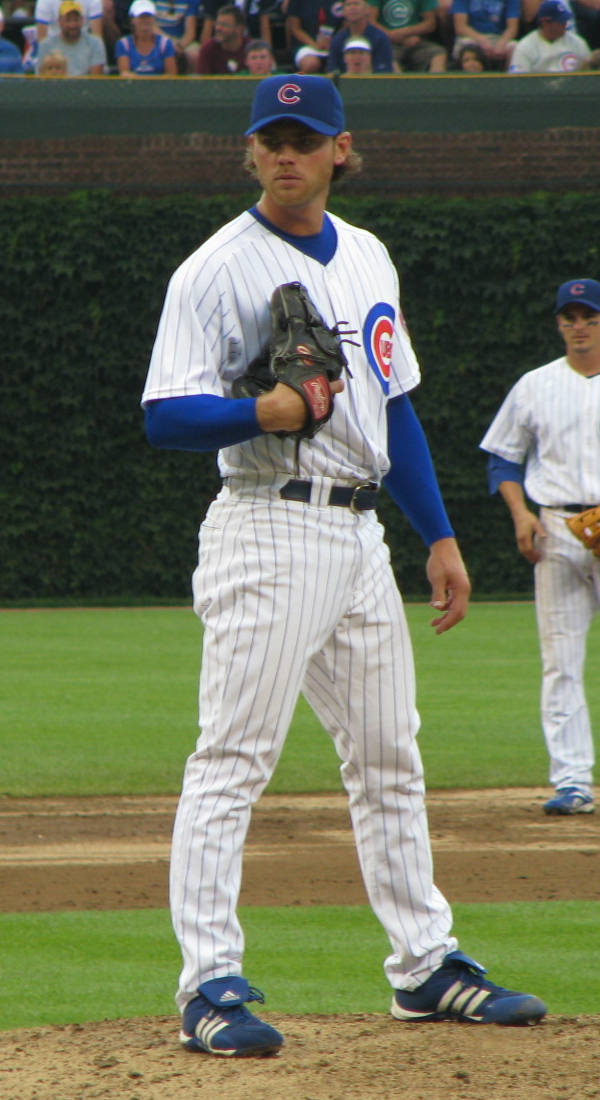
Cotts during his tenure with the Chicago Cubs in 2008

On December 13, 2007, the Cubs re-signed Cotts to a one-year contract for $800,000. He began the 2008 season in Triple–A, as he'd ended the previous season. He would be recalled from Triple–A, however, in May and remained with Cubs as their primary left handed reliever after the club had traded away veteran pitcher Scott Eyre.

In 2009, Cotts started with the Cubs, but was demoted to the team's Triple–A minor league Iowa club in May. On June 24, he felt a sharp pain while pitching for Iowa, and his season was over with an elbow ligament injury. He underwent successful Tommy John surgery in July 2009. He was non-tendered on December 12 and became a free agent.

==== Recovering from Injuries ====
On January 4, 2010, Cotts signed a minor league contract with the Pittsburgh Pirates with an invite to spring training. In June, he had the first of four surgeries on his hip ending his comeback bid for the season. On September 17, the Pirates released him.

On November 22, 2010, Cotts signed a minor league contract with the New York Yankees that included an invitation to 2011 spring training. Due to the results of his physical, the Yankees released him on February 16, 2011. For the second straight season, he did not pitch professionally.

=== Texas Rangers ===
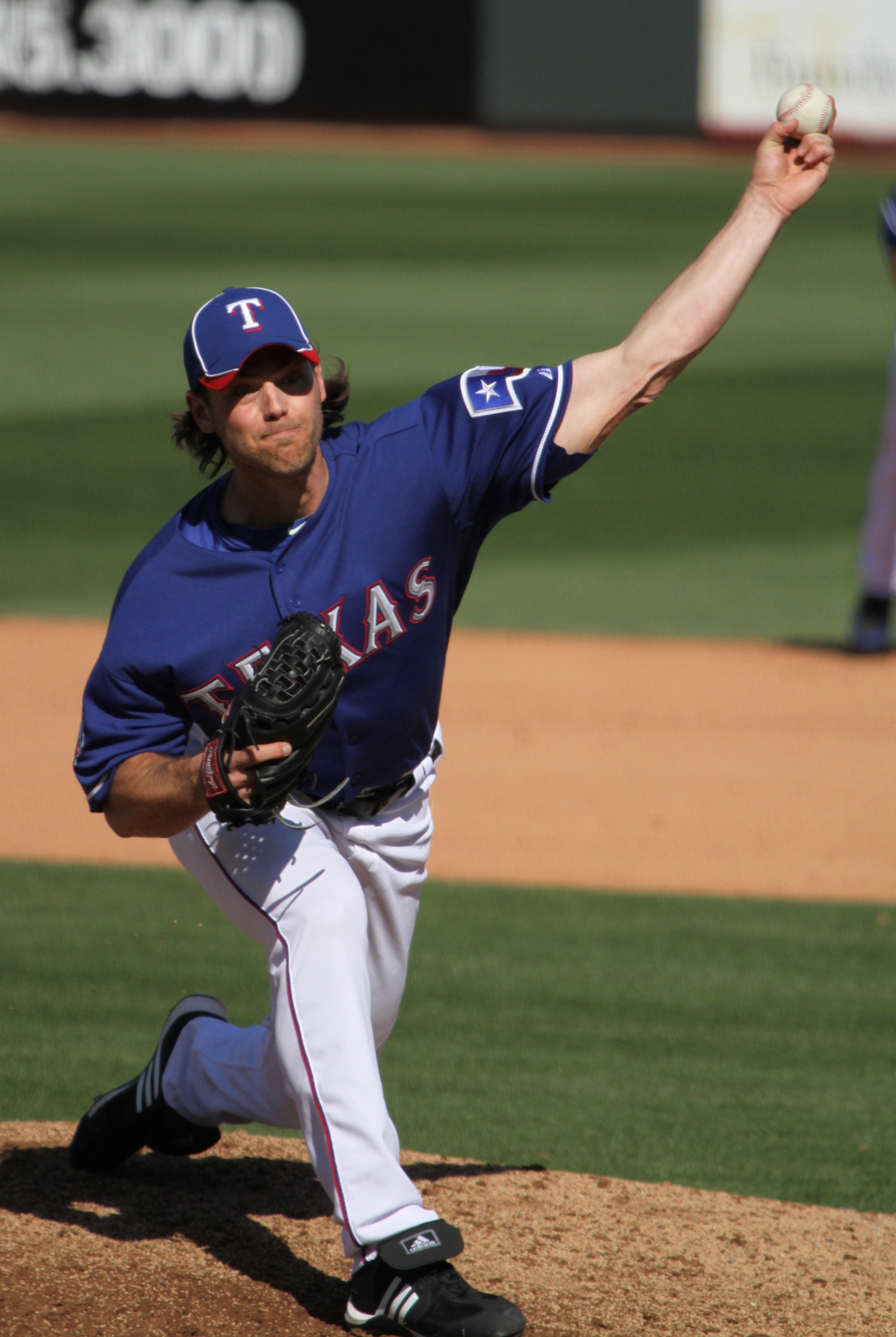
Cotts pitching for the Texas Rangers in 2012 spring training

Cotts signed with the Texas Rangers and was in contention in spring training to return to the Major Leagues, but suffered an arm strain injury. He finally appeared in a professional game for the first time since 2009 on June 11, 2012, pitching for the Texas Rangers' Triple-A affiliate Round Rock. He finished the season with Round Rock posting a 4.55 ERA with 3 saves while striking out 41 in 31.2 innings.

On November 12, 2012, Cotts signed a minor league deal with an invitation to spring training to return to the Rangers organization. He failed to make the Rangers out of spring training in 2013 and rejoined Round Rock. He posted a 0.78 ERA with a 3–1 record and was promoted to the Rangers on May 21, 2013. After a nearly four-year absence from the Major Leagues, he threw six pitches against the Oakland Athletics on May 21. His agent Joe Bick said, "When he went back to the mound that first time, I had a lump the size of a softball in my throat." Cotts said of his return to the Major Leagues, "There's a point where you go through all of it where you don't know if you're ever going to play again; I never was really accepting of that." He became a left-handed specialist for the Rangers' bullpen. However, Cotts had better platoon splits against right-handed batters than left-handed batters after joining the Rangers. In 2013, he held opposing right-handed batters to a .436 on-base plus slugging (OPS) percentage while left-handed hitters had a .565 OPS.

Cotts returned to the Rangers in 2014 and pitched in a career-high 73 games. However, he was not as effective as he was the year before. He was granted free agency after the season and was not re-signed by the club.

=== Milwaukee Brewers / Minnesota Twins ===
On January 29, 2015, Cotts signed a one-year, $3 million contract with the Milwaukee Brewers. On August 21, Cotts was traded to the Minnesota Twins in exchange for a player to be named later or cash considerations. In 68 appearances split between the Brewers and Twins, he was 1–0 with a 3.41 ERA in 63 1/3 innings while striking out 8.2 and walking 3.1 per nine innings.

=== Los Angeles Angels ===
On February 26, 2016, Cotts signed a minor league contract with the Houston Astros. He was released in March and signed a minor league contract with the Los Angeles Angels of Anaheim, where he began the year with the Triple-A Salt Lake Bees. On May 17, he exercised an opt-out clause in his contract and became a free agent.

=== New York Yankees ===
On May 20, 2016, Cotts signed a minor league contract with the New York Yankees and was assigned to the Scranton/Wilkes-Barre RailRiders.

=== Texas Rangers (second stint) ===
On June 20, 2016, Cotts signed a minor league contract to return to the Texas Rangers organization. In 20 relief outings for the Triple–A Round Rock Express, he recorded a 3.80 ERA with 23 strikeouts across 23 2/3 innings pitched. Cotts elected free agency following the season on November 7.

=== Washington Nationals ===
On January 13, 2017, Cotts signed a minor league deal with the Washington Nationals. In 52 relief outings for the Triple–A Syracuse Chiefs, he posted a 3.94 ERA with 57 strikeouts and 2 saves in 48.0 innings of work. Cotts elected free agency following the season on November 6.
