= Carlos Vásquez (baseball) =

Venezuelan baseball player

- Pitcher
- Born: December 6, 1982 (age 42); Sucre, Venezuela
- Bats: Left Throws: Left

Carlos Augusto Vásquez (born December 6, 1982, in Sucre, Venezuela) is a Venezuelan former professional baseball pitcher. He played in Minor League Baseball for organizations including the Chicago Cubs, Chicago White Sox, and Boston Red Sox, primarily as a relief pitcher. Vásquez also competed in the Venezuelan Winter League, representing teams such as Caribes de Anzoátegui and Águilas del Zulia. Over his professional career, he transitioned from a starting pitcher to a reliever and compiled a career record of approximately 46–40 with a 3.82 ERA.

== Career ==
Vásquez was originally signed as an undrafted free agent by the Chicago Cubs on February 21, 2000. Vásquez missed the 2001 season after undergoing Tommy John surgery on November 2, 2000.

In 2002, Vásquez spent the season with the Single-A Boise Hawks. His 15 starts led the Northwest League, complemented by a 4.26 ERA and a 5–6 record. In 2003, Vásquez played for the Single-A Lansing Lugnuts. He made 23 starts in 24 games and had a 10–13 record despite a good ERA of 3.74. Injuries in 2004, while playing for the Single-A Daytona Cubs, held him to only 16 starts in which he went 6–5 with a 3.87 ERA.

On April 4, 2005, he was suspended for 15 games for violating the league's joint drug prevention and treatment program. Regardless, he did not play at all in 2005, following surgery on his left shoulder. In 2006, Vásquez became a full-time relief pitcher. Splitting the season at Daytona and West Tenn, the Cubs Double-A affiliate, he played in a combined 54 games with a 6–5 record and a 2.75 ERA.

On November 16, 2006, Vásquez was traded to the Chicago White Sox along with David Aardsma for Neal Cotts. In his first season in the White Sox organization, Vásquez split the 2007 season with the Double-A Birmingham Barons and the Triple-A Charlotte Knights. Making a combined 52 relief appearances, he had a 4–3 record with a 2.70 ERA.

On March 12, 2008, Vásquez was released by the White Sox. Vasquez signed with the Red Sox in March 2008, but was released on August 27, 2008.
