= David Patton (baseball) =

American baseball player (born 1984)

- Pitcher
- Born: May 18, 1984 (age 42); Seattle, Washington, U.S.
- Batted: Right Threw: Right

MLB debut
- April 8, 2009, for the Chicago Cubs

Last MLB appearance
- October 2, 2009, for the Chicago Cubs

MLB statistics
- Win–loss record: 3–1
- Earned run average: 6.83
- Strikeouts: 23
- Stats at Baseball Reference

Teams
- Chicago Cubs (2009)

David Christopher Patton aka "Cheetoh" (born May 18, 1984) is an American former professional baseball pitcher. He played in Major League Baseball (MLB) for the Chicago Cubs.

== Career ==
Patton graduated from Kentridge High School in 2002, and then attended Green River Community College. He was selected by the Colorado Rockies in 12th Round (350th overall) of 2004 MLB draft and made his Minor League debut in 2004, with the Casper Rockies, going 2-3 in 17 games. He split the 2005 season with the Tri-City Dust Devils and the Asheville Tourists. Patton had a 7-4 record in Single-A Asheville in 2006. In 2007 and 2008, Patton pitched for the Modesto Nuts, having a combined 9-10 record in two seasons there.

Patton was chosen by the Chicago Cubs in the 2008 Rule 5 Draft and was added to the Cubs' opening day bullpen. Patton appeared in 20 games for the Cubs, managing to compile a 3–1 record despite a 6.83 ERA with 19 walks and 23 strikeouts. He was released by the Cubs on December 12, 2010 and never appeared in professional game following the 2009.

== See also ==
- Rule 5 draft results
