= Ángel Guzmán =

Venezuelan baseball player (born 1981)

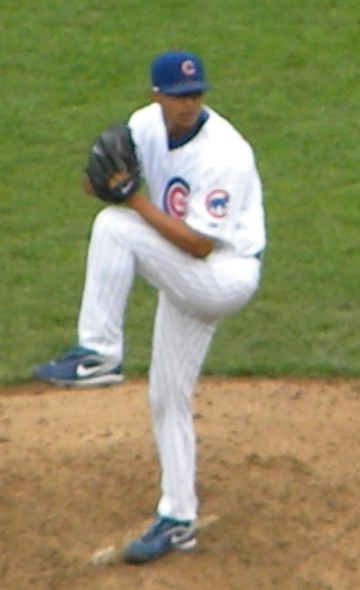
- Guzmán with the Chicago Cubs
- Pitcher
- Born: December 14, 1981 (age 44); Caracas, Venezuela
- Batted: Right Threw: Right

MLB debut
- April 26, 2006, for the Chicago Cubs

Last MLB appearance
- September 8, 2009, for the Chicago Cubs

MLB statistics
- Win–loss record: 3–10
- Earned run average: 4.82
- Strikeouts: 143
- Stats at Baseball Reference

Teams
- Chicago Cubs (2006–2009)

Ángel Moisés Guzmán (born December 14, 1981) is a Venezuelan former professional baseball pitcher. Listed at 6 feet 3 inches (1.91 m), 195 pounds (88 kg), Guzmán bats and throws right-handed. He played in Major League Baseball (MLB) for the Chicago Cubs.

== Career ==
=== Chicago Cubs ===
Guzmán was originally signed by the Kansas City Royals as an amateur free agent on March 4, 1999, but his signing was voided and he signed with the Chicago Cubs on November 12, 1999. In 2000, he went 1–1 with a 1.93 ERA for the La Pradera club of the Venezuelan Summer League. In 2001, he pitched for the Boise Hawks, going 9–1 with a 2.23 ERA, 19 walks and 63 strikeouts in 77 innings pitched. He was second in the Northwest League in ERA, trailing Jesse Foppert, and he led the league in wins. He made the league All-Star team. He was rated the #4 prospect in the league according to Baseball America.

In 2002, Guzmán went 5–2 with a 1.89 ERA for the Lansing Lugnuts and 6–2, 2.39 with the Daytona Cubs. He was the #13 prospect in the Midwest League and #11 in the Florida State League according to Baseball America. In 2003, he went 3–3 with a 2.81 ERA for the West Tenn Diamond Jaxx, striking out 87 and walking 26 in 90 innings of work. He was rated the ninth-best prospect in the Southern League and picked to perform in the All-Star Futures Game, but was unable to do so when he injured his right shoulder, cutting his year short. In 2004, he had a 5.60 ERA and 0–3 record for West Tenn and 3–1, 4.20 for Daytona in a total of 11 starts. In 2005, he pitched in four games for the AZL Cubs (with 17 strikeouts and one walk in 12 innings pitched) and two for the Peoria Chiefs.

Guzmán was promoted to the Triple-A Iowa Cubs in 2006. He was 4–4 with a 4.04 ERA. He also made 15 appearances in the majors in 2006 (10 of them starts) for the Cubs, going 0–6 with a 7.39 ERA, but with more than a strikeout per inning.

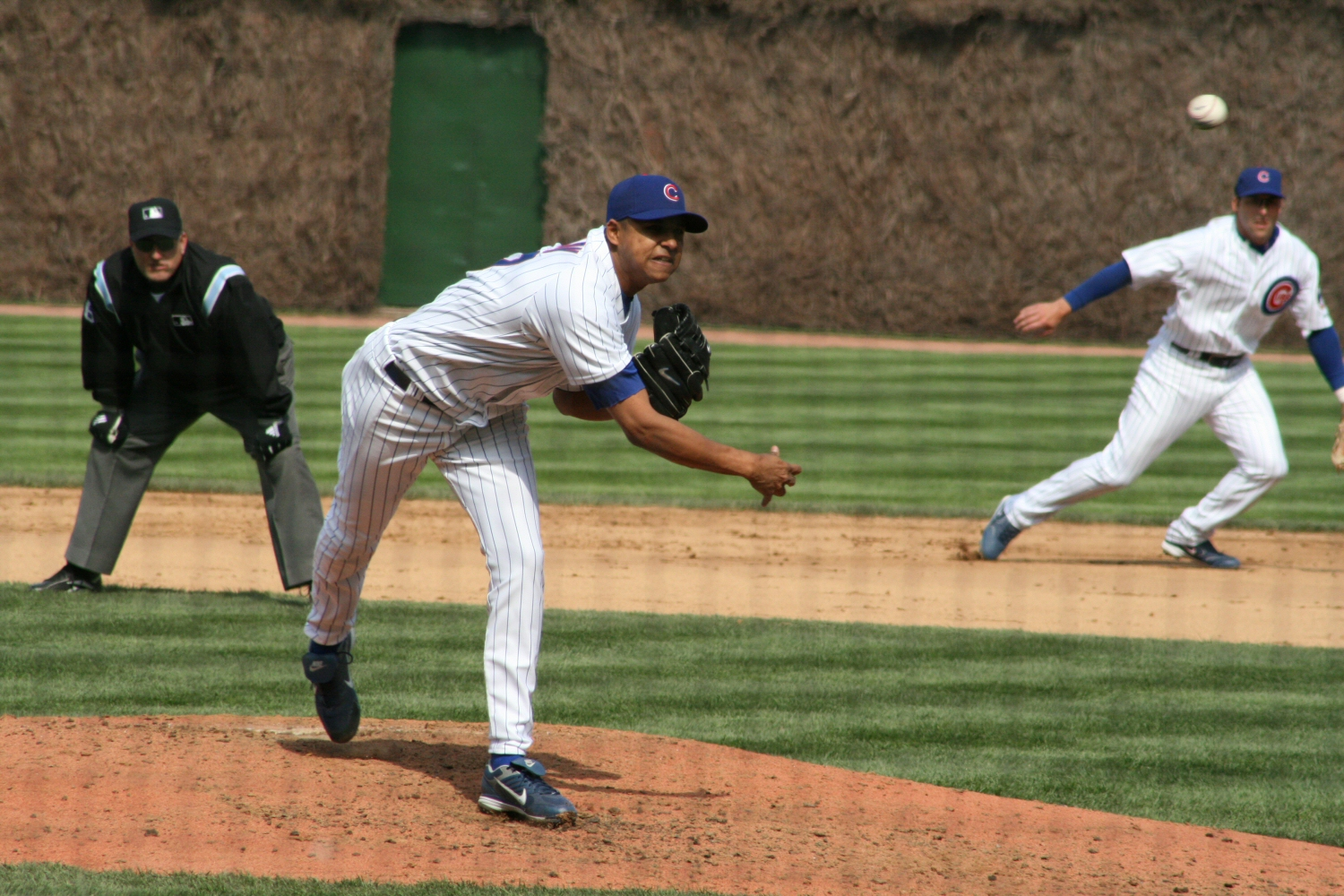
Guzman pitching in 2007.

Guzmán started the 2007 season with the Cubs in the bullpen, but was sent down to the minors to gain more innings of work due to a crowded staff. He gained an opportunity when the Cubs fifth starter Wade Miller was injured on April 22. Since the Cubs had several off-dates in their schedule, Guzmán had the opportunity for a few additional starts, but did not impress the Cubs manager Lou Piniella by pitching poorly at the Triple-A level.

Guzmán took advantage of the opportunity by giving up only one run in five innings of work against the Washington Nationals. While he did not gain the win in the Cubs 4–3 victory, it did impress Piniella.

Piniella stuck with Guzmán for three starts before targeting him as a future setup man or closer.

Guzmán was replaced by Sean Marshall as the fifth starter on May 22. On the 18th of April 2009, Guzmán earned his first career win against the St. Louis Cardinals in an 11-inning Cubs victory.

During early spring training in 2010, Guzmán suffered significant ligament tears in the front bottom of his right (throwing) shoulder. The injury was thought to be career-threatening. On March 18, after consulting with Dr. James Andrews, Guzman had surgery on his shoulder, and missed the entire season. After the season, the Cubs outrighted Guzmán from the 40 man roster and signed him to a minor league contract with an invitation to spring training. He returned in 2011 to make 17 starts for the A class Daytona Cubs.

=== Los Angeles Dodgers ===
Guzmán became a free agent after the season and signed a minor league contract with the Los Angeles Dodgers on December 13, 2011. He also received an invitation to spring training. Guzmán was suspended by MLB for the first 50 games of the 2012 season due to his second violation of Minor league drug prevention program. He was activated off the suspended list on June 12 and assigned to the Triple-A Albuquerque Isotopes. Guzmán pitched in 23 games for the Isotopes and was 2–1 with a 4.43 ERA in 22 1/3 innings of work.

== Coaching Career ==
=== Chicago Cubs ===
Guzmán was named pitching coach of the Venezuelan Summer League Cubs, the Venezuelan rookie-level affiliate of the Chicago Cubs.

=== Toronto Blue Jays ===
In 2026, Guzmán was named as a coach for the FCL Blue Jays the rookie-level affiliate of the Toronto Blue Jays.

== Personal life ==
His mother lives in the Dominican Republic with a sister. An older brother and four other sisters are still in Caracas, Venezuela.
On 11 January 2010, one of his brother, Daniel, was shot dead in Caracas. He was 28 years old.

== See also ==
- List of Major League Baseball players from Venezuela
