= Jason Waddell =

American baseball player (born 1981)

- Relief pitcher
- Born: June 11, 1981 (age 45); Huntington Beach, California, U.S.
- Batted: Right Threw: Left

MLB debut
- May 31, 2009, for the Chicago Cubs

Last MLB appearance
- June 12, 2009, for the Chicago Cubs

MLB statistics
- Win–loss: 0–0
- Earned run average: 5.40
- Strikeouts: 2
- Stats at Baseball Reference

Teams
- Chicago Cubs (2009)

Jason Robert Waddell (born June 11, 1981) is an American former left-handed Major League Baseball (MLB) pitcher. Waddell played baseball at La Sierra High School in Riverside, California before moving on to the minor leagues.

== San Francisco Giants ==
Waddell played for the Giants minor league organization from 2001 through 2008 before being moved to the Chicago Cubs.

== Chicago Cubs ==
Waddell made his Major League Baseball debut on May 31, 2009 Wearing #43, and appeared in three games before being released by the Chicago Cubs on August 5, 2009.

== Detroit Tigers ==
On August 18, 2009, Waddell signed a minor league contract with the Detroit Tigers and was assigned to the Double-A Erie SeaWolves.

On January 14, 2010, Waddell re-signed a minor league contract to return to the Detroit Tigers.
