= Sean Marshall (baseball) =

American baseball player (born 1982)

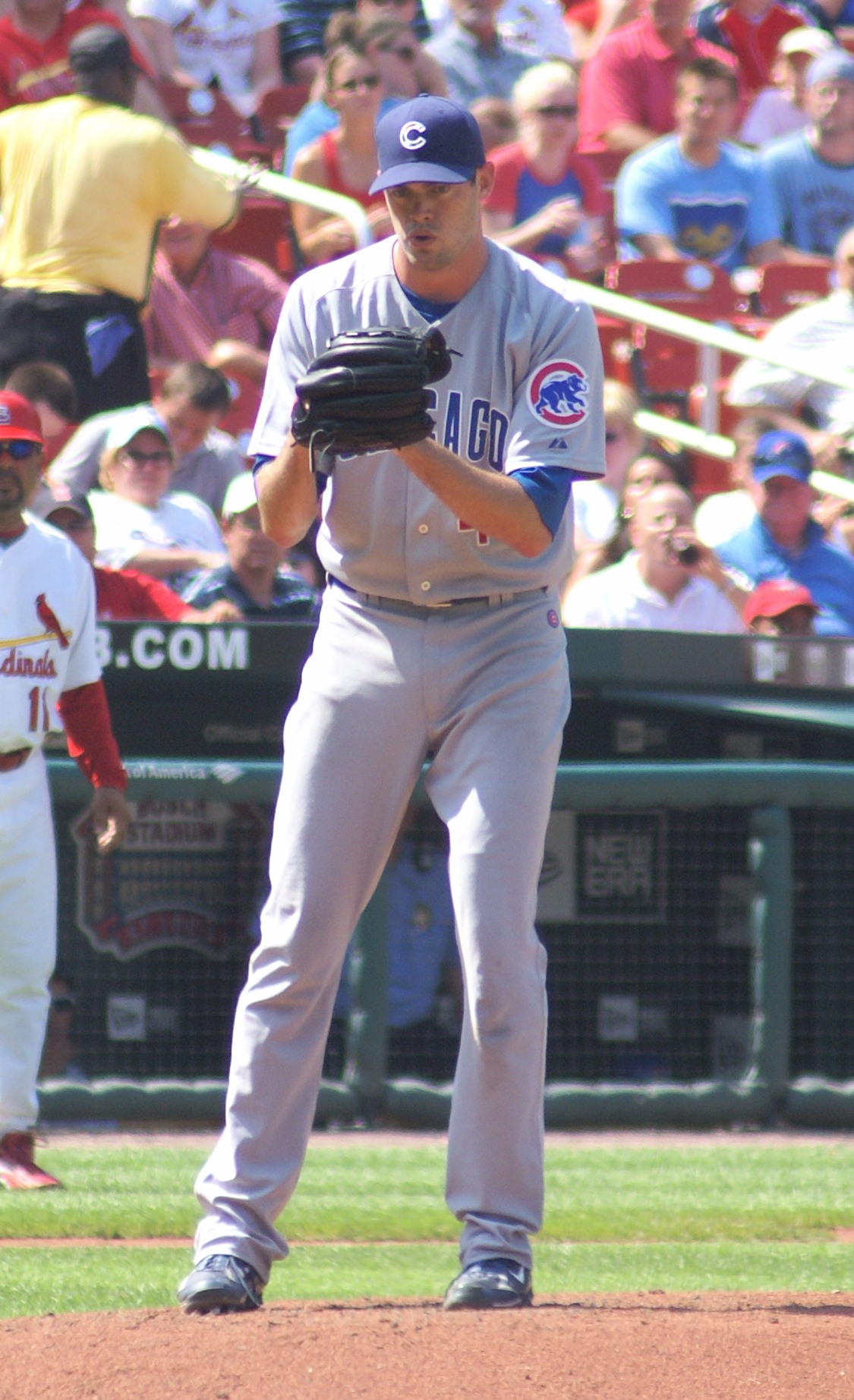
- Marshall with the Chicago Cubs in 2008
- Pitcher
- Born: August 30, 1982 (age 43); Richmond, Virginia, U.S.
- Batted: Left Threw: Left

MLB debut
- April 9, 2006, for the Chicago Cubs

Last MLB appearance
- June 10, 2014, for the Cincinnati Reds

MLB statistics
- Win–loss record: 37–46
- Earned run average: 3.86
- Strikeouts: 537
- Stats at Baseball Reference

Teams
- Chicago Cubs (2006–2011); Cincinnati Reds (2012–2014)

Sean Christopher Marshall (born August 30, 1982), nicknamed "Big Smooth", is an American former professional baseball pitcher. He played in Major League Baseball (MLB) for the Chicago Cubs and Cincinnati Reds.

Marshall graduated from Manchester High School in Midlothian, Virginia, in 2000. He attended Virginia Commonwealth University, and was drafted by the Cubs in the sixth round of the 2003 Major League Baseball draft. Marshall spent three years in the minor leagues before being promoted to play with the Cubs, and had 24 starts in his rookie season in 2006. Marshall started the 2007 season on the disabled list, but returned to the Cubs' rotation in mid-May.

Marshall's twin brother Brian also plays baseball, and was taken in the fifth round of the same draft by the Boston Red Sox.

== Minor league career ==
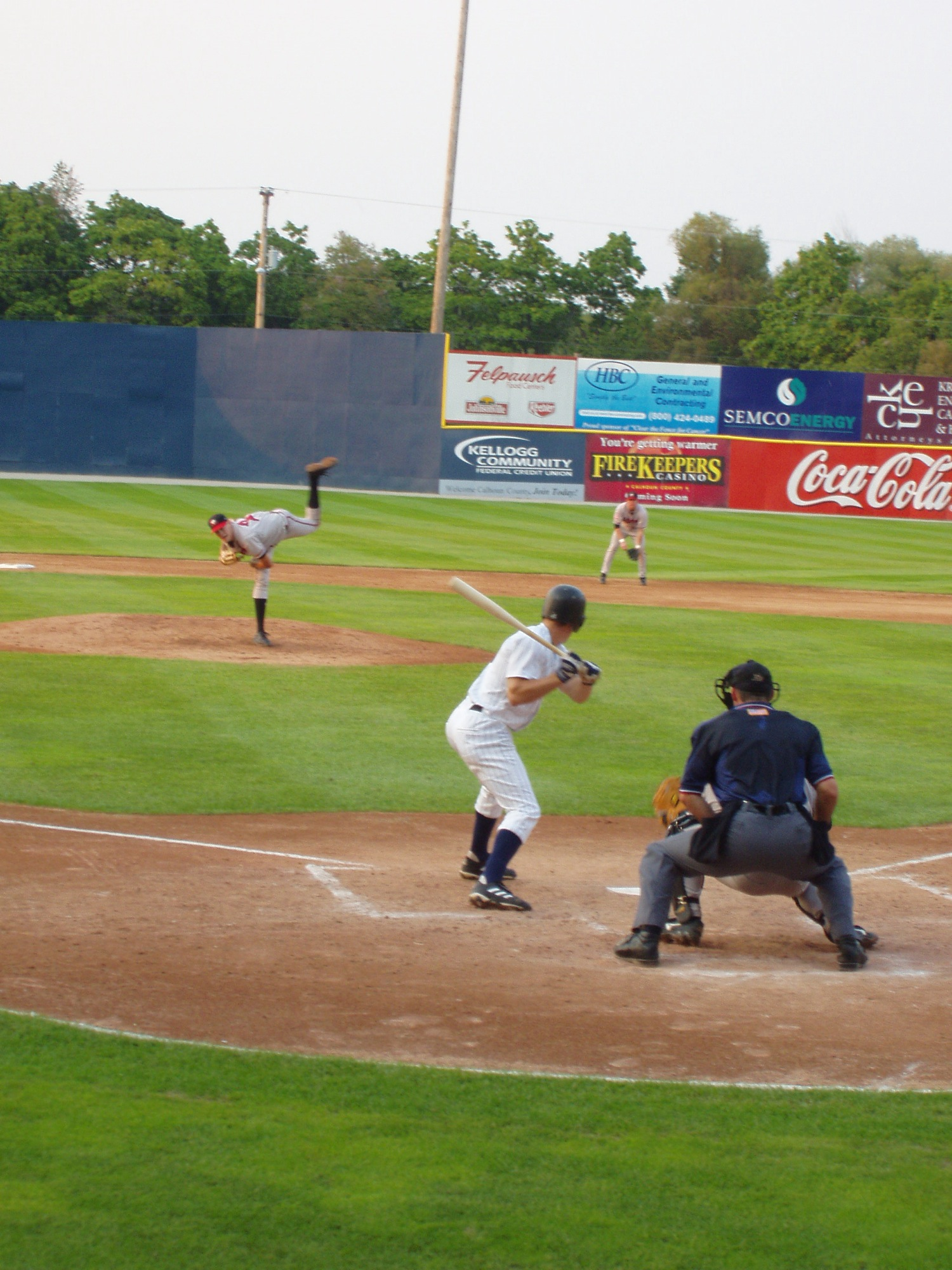
Marshall pitching for the Lansing Lugnuts in 2003

Marshall was drafted by the Cubs in the sixth round of the 2003 amateur draft after pitching for three seasons at VCU including a junior season where he went 7–2 with a 2.61 ERA recording 95 strikeouts in 86.1 innings. He signed with the Cubs on June 7, 2003, and was assigned to the Single-A Boise Hawks. Marshall was moved up a level each successive season, pitching in AA in 2004 and AAA in 2005. In 2006, Marshall spent the majority of the season with the major league team after starting the season at AAA. The following season he started in the minors, but as part of a rehab program healing from an arm injury.

== Major League career ==
=== Chicago Cubs ===
Marshall made his major league debut against the St. Louis Cardinals on April 9, 2006, recording a no-decision. In that game he yielded a two-run homer to Scott Rolen in the first inning before settling down to pitch solidly for 4+ innings. The Cubs trailed 4–3 in the late innings, but rallied to win on a Michael Barrett grand slam in the eighth inning. He earned his first major league win on April 14, 2006, against the Pittsburgh Pirates. Marshall indicated his pleasure with the start. He stayed in the starting rotation for the first half of the year before suffering a strained left side muscle. Marshall left the rotation after a crushing loss on July 16 in which the Cubs gave up two grand slams in one inning, blowing a 5–2 lead in the 6th inning against the New York Mets. In 19 starts, Sean posted a 5–8 record with a 4.98 ERA. On September 2, Marshall returned to the Cubs' rotation, but posted a loss against the San Francisco Giants. During the game, he gave up career home run #728 to Barry Bonds in Chicago. In his remaining four starts, Marshall struggled, and completed six innings only once.

Marshall was fighting for the fifth starting pitcher spot for the 2007 Chicago Cubs organization. After rehabbing from a sore shoulder he started the season in Des Moines, Iowa, with the AAA Iowa Cubs. On May 22, Marshall was promoted to the Cubs' starting rotation by manager Lou Piniella replacing Ángel Guzmán. Marshall struggled to get run support in his first two starts and fell to 0–2. On June 3, 2007, he claimed his first win of 2007 by matching a career high 8 strikeouts by leading the Cubs to a 10–1 victory over the Atlanta Braves.

Marshall extended his string of quality starts with two additional wins against the Atlanta Braves and the Seattle Mariners, improving his record to 3–2. On June 13, 2007, Marshall pitched eight innings against Seattle, giving up seven hits and only two earned runs.

Marshall continued his strong June, and was 4–0 with a 2.32 ERA, but was dealt a loss on June 30 by the Milwaukee Brewers lasting just two innings and giving up seven runs. In July, Marshall continued pitching well, giving up only six runs in his four starts; however, the Cubs did not provide much run support as he only gained one victory during the span.

In spring training in 2008, Marshall led the majors in wild pitches, with 5 in 14.2 innings. Marshall was not called up to the Cubs at the start of the season, however on April 9 he was recalled. That day, he collected his first major league save in a 15 inning Cubs victory against the Pittsburgh Pirates. Marshall pitched against the Baltimore Orioles on June 24. He pitched 4.2 innings gave up 7 hits 4 runs 1 walk but struck out 7.

In July 2009, he played in left field for one out.

=== Cincinnati Reds ===
Marshall was traded to the Cincinnati Reds on December 21, 2011, in exchange for Travis Wood, Dave Sappelt and Ronald Torreyes.

On February 27, 2012, Marshall signed a three-year, $16.5 million extension that runs through 2015. Each year of his contract has up to $2 million in bonuses, $1 million each for games started and games finished. He will earn $4.5 million in 2013, $5.5 million in 2014 and $6.5 million in 2015, excluding possible bonuses. The bonuses for games finished will be added to his current salary this year, as the starts bonus was already in his existing contract.

After a season-ending injury to closer Ryan Madson, Marshall was named the Reds' closer for the 2012 season. However, due to Marshall's poor performance in the closing role, the Reds named phenom Aroldis Chapman the closer in late May 2012. He became a free agent following the 2015 season.

== Pitching style ==
Marshall was unusual in that he threw breaking balls more than any other type of pitch; in 2011, almost 75 percent of his pitches were either curveballs or sliders. Marshall also possessed two fastballs, a four-seamer and a two-seamer, that he threw in the low 90s. In contrast to most pitchers, who get ahead in the count with a fastball and try to fool batters later with off-speed pitches, Marshall used his breaking balls early in the count and used his fastball most frequently when the count was 0–2. His curveball proved to be his best pitch at getting swings and misses, with a whiff rate of 40% in 2011. In 2012, Marshall revived an upper-80s cutter that he had not used since 2009.

Marshall became successful in part through his propensity to get ground balls. His ground ball/fly ball ratio improved every season from 2008 to 2011, to the point that Marshall got more than two ground balls for every fly ball.

== Personal life ==
Marshall is married to a woman named Sarah, with Ernie Banks performing the ceremony. In 2020, Marshall was hired as a pre- and post-game analyst for Cubs telecasts on Marquee Sports Network.
