= Jeff Stevens (baseball) =

American baseball player (born 1983)

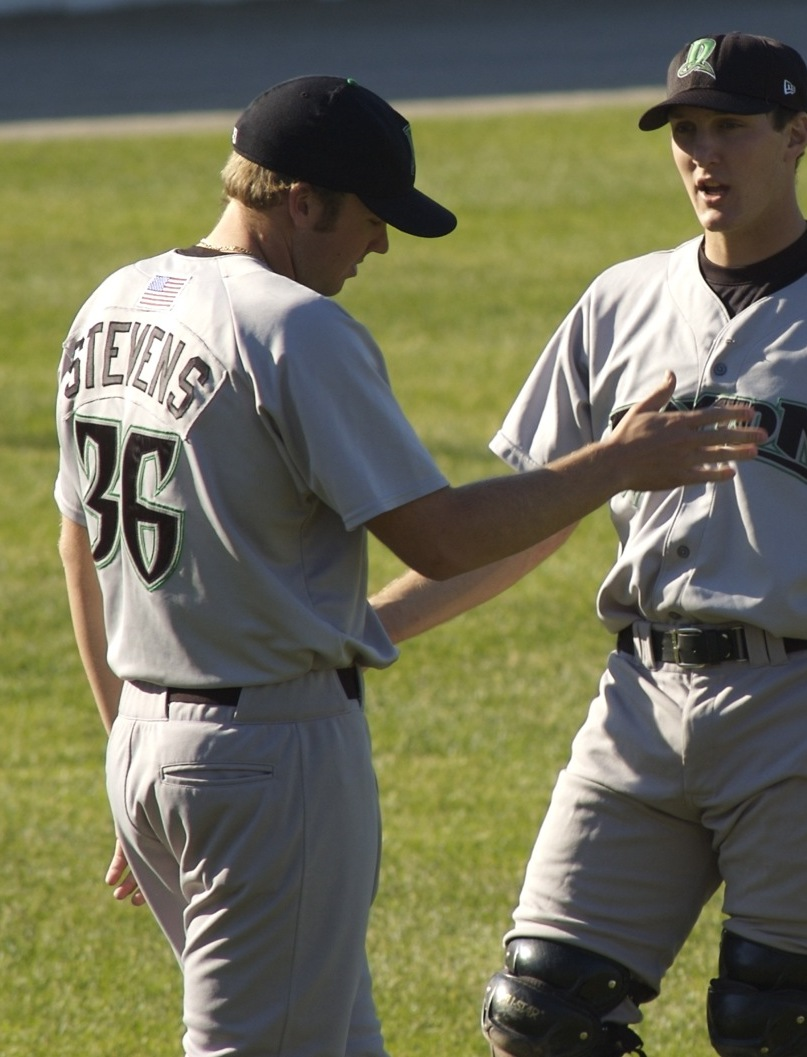
- Stevens (left) with the Dayton Dragons in 2006
- Pitcher
- Born: September 5, 1983 (age 42); Berkeley, California, U.S.
- Batted: Right Threw: Right

MLB debut
- July 10, 2009, for the Chicago Cubs

Last MLB appearance
- April 22, 2011, for the Chicago Cubs

MLB statistics
- Win–loss record: 1–0
- Earned run average: 6.27
- Strikeouts: 28
- Stats at Baseball Reference

Teams
- Chicago Cubs (2009–2011)
Medals
Men's baseball
Representing United States
Olympic Games
| Bronze medal – third place | 2008 Beijing | Team |
Baseball World Cup
| Gold medal – first place | 2007 Tianmu | National team |

Jeffrey Allen Stevens (born September 5, 1983) is an American former professional baseball pitcher who is currently an area scout for the Baltimore Orioles of Major League Baseball. During his active career, he worked in 33 MLB games pitched, all in relief, for the 2009–2011 Chicago Cubs. He threw and batted right-handed, stood 6 feet 2 inches (1.88 m) tall and weighed 205 pounds (93 kg).

== Early life ==
Stevens was born in Berkeley, California. He graduated from Campolindo High School in Moraga, California.

== College ==
Stevens started, and relieved at Loyola Marymount College in Los Angeles, California, from 2003 to 2005. While at LMU, Stevens recorded back-to-back All-Conference honors in 2004 and 2005. Over his three-year stint as an LMU Lion, Stevens recorded a 14–10 record with a 4.43 ERA in 64 appearances, 30 of them starts.

Stevens was drafted by the Reds in the sixth round of the 2005 Major League Baseball draft.

== Professional career ==
Stevens made his professional debut with the Billings Mustangs in 2005, going 4–4 with a 2.98 ERA.

Stevens started 2006 with the Single-A Dayton Dragons. He was traded to the Cleveland Indians as the player to be named later in the Brandon Phillips trade. He was assigned to Single-A Lake County Captains where he spent the remainder of the 2006 season.

In 2007, Stevens was moved to the bullpen and began the year with the Kinston Indians. He was 3–2 with a 2.31 ERA, with 37 strikeouts in 35 innings pitched for Kinston. He was promoted to Double-A Akron Aeros where he was 3–1 with a 3.17 ERA and 2 saves in 34 games.

Stevens began the 2008 campaign with the Aeros. After going 5–1 with a 2.51 ERA, he earned a promotion to the Triple-A Buffalo Bisons. He was 0–2 with a 4.00 ERA when his season ended as a result of being named to the US Olympic Baseball Team to play in Beijing.

In December 2008, Stevens was traded from the Cleveland Indians to the Chicago Cubs in a deal for Mark DeRosa.

On July 10, 2009, Stevens made his Major League debut for the Chicago Cubs. Stevens had a 1–2–3 MLB debut, getting Joe Thurston, Chris Duncan and Brendan Ryan in order in the 9th inning of an 8–3 loss to the Cardinals. He was optioned back to the minor leagues on August 5, 2009, when Aaron Miles was activated from the 15-day disabled list.

He was designated for assignment by the Cubs on May 30, 2011.

Stevens signed a minor league contract with the New York Mets on January 4, 2012. Stevens spent most of the year with Triple-A Buffalo, going 1–1 with a 3.32 ERA in 34 games, finishing 12 of them, while striking out 33 in 40.2 innings.

On November 22, 2012, Stevens signed a minor league deal with the organization he started it all with, the Cincinnati Reds. He was then released on March 24.

Stevens signed with the Southern Maryland Blue Crabs of the independent Atlantic League for the 2013 season. In 47 games with Southern Maryland, he went 4–3 with 14 games finished and a 3.98 ERA, striking out 43 in 61 innings. He then retired from the field, and the Orioles named Stevens an area scout in Nevada and Northern California in February 2014.

== 2008 Beijing Olympics ==
With the score tied at 7, Lee Taek-Keun advanced to third base when Stevens attempted to pick him off at first, but threw the ball erratically. This was scored as an error. It was a costly one as the batter then hit a sacrifice fly and Lee scored, winning the game for Korea.
